= Tartan =

Predominantly Scottish cloth pattern

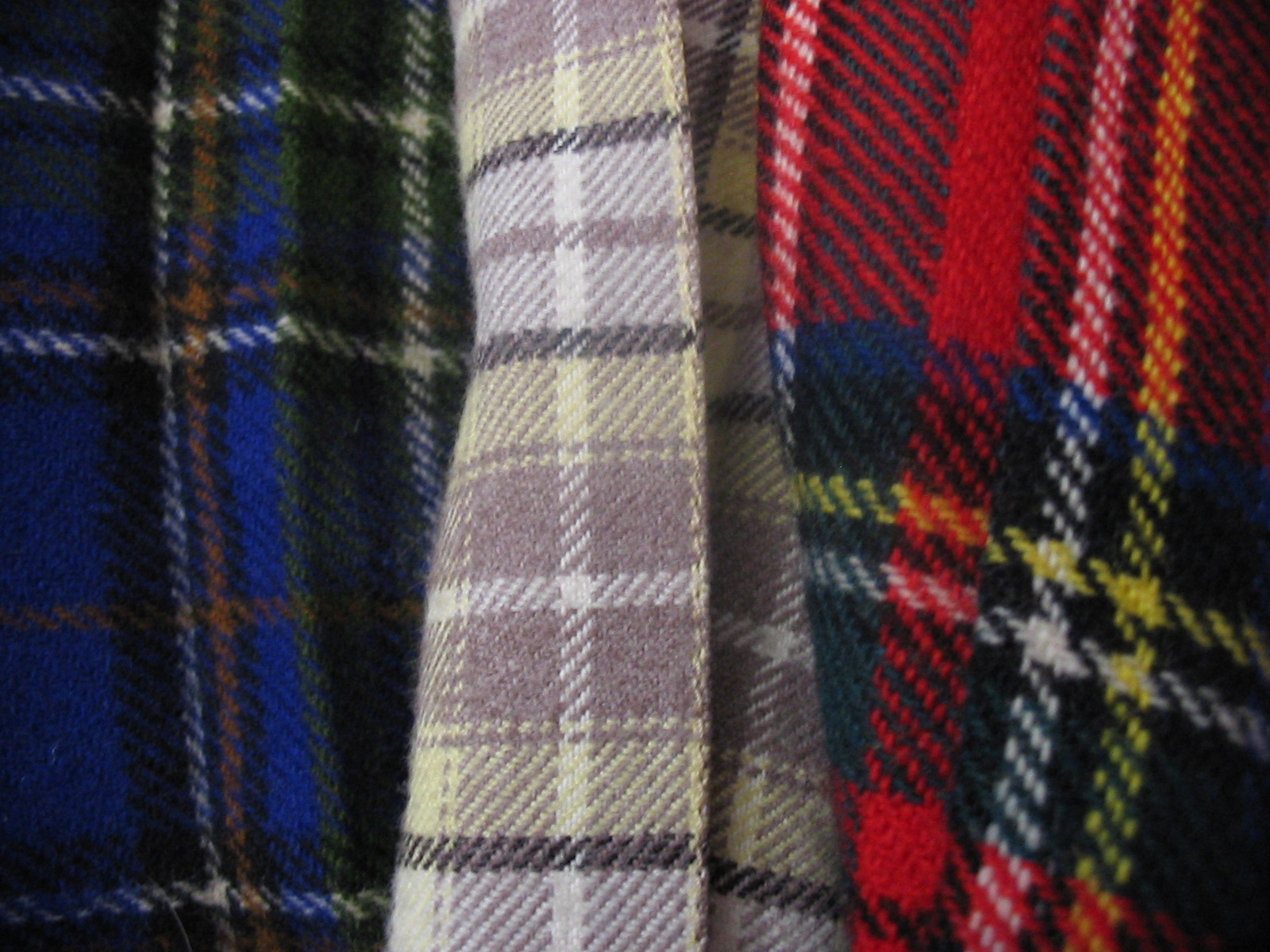
Three tartans; the left and right are made with the "modern" dye palette; the middle is made with "muted" colours.

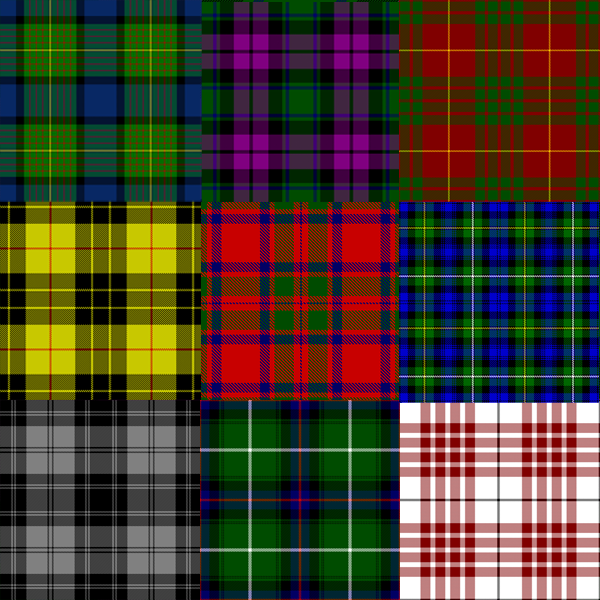
Tartans come in a wide variety of colours and patterns.

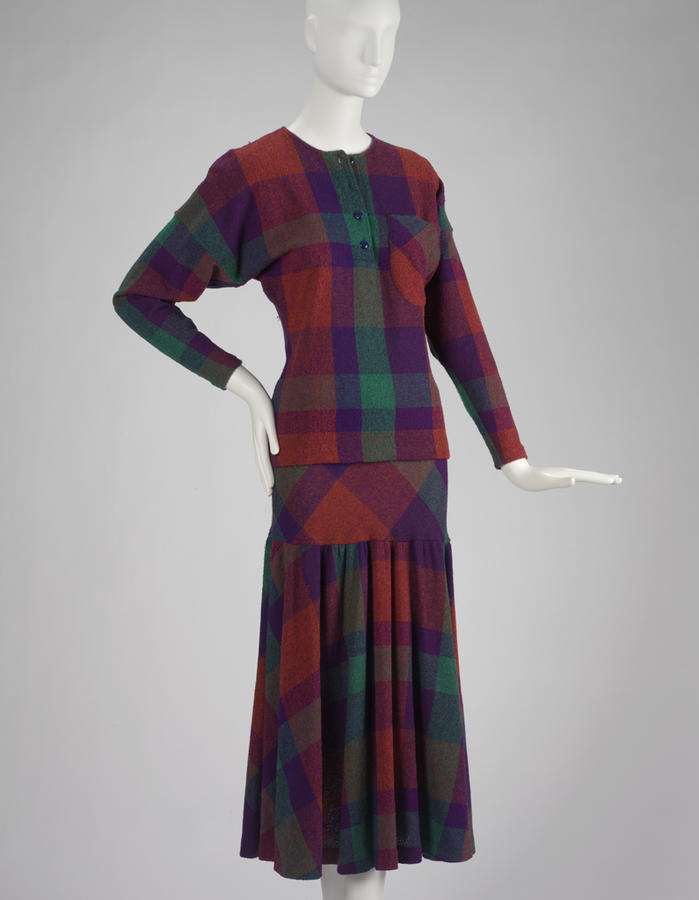
1970s Missoni tartan knit jumper (sweater) and skirt set

Tartan (Scottish Gaelic: breacan [ˈpɾʲɛxkən]), also known, especially in American English, as plaid (/plæd/), is a patterned cloth consisting of crossing horizontal and vertical bands in multiple colours, forming repeating symmetrical patterns known as setts. Tartan patterns vary in complexity, from simple two-colour designs to intricate motifs with over twenty hues. Originating in woven wool, tartan is most strongly associated with Scotland, where it has been used for centuries in traditional clothing such as the kilt. Specific tartans are linked to Scottish clans, families, or regions, with patterns and colours derived historically from local natural dyes (now supplanted by artificial ones). Tartans also serve institutional roles, including military uniforms and organisational branding.

Tartan became a symbol of Scottish identity, especially from the 17th century onward, despite a ban under the Dress Act 1746 lasting about two generations following the Jacobite rising of 1745. The 19th-century Highland Revival popularized tartan globally by associating it with Highland dress and the Scottish diaspora. Today, tartan is used worldwide in clothing, accessories, and design, transcending its traditional roots. Modern tartans are registered for organisations, individuals, and commemorative purposes, with thousands of designs in the Scottish Register of Tartans.

While often linked to Scottish heritage, tartans exist in other cultures, such as Africa, East and South Asia, and Eastern Europe. The earliest surviving samples of tartan-style cloth are around 3,000 years old and were discovered in Xinjiang, China.

== Etymology and terminology ==
The English and Scots word tartan is possibly derived from French tiretaine meaning 'linsey-woolsey cloth'. Other hypotheses are that it derives from Scottish Gaelic tarsainn or tarsuinn, meaning 'across' or 'crossing over'; or from French tartarin or tartaryn (occurring in 1454 spelled tartyn) meaning 'Tartar cloth'. It is unrelated to the superficially similar word tarlatan, which refers to a very open-weave muslin similar to cheesecloth. Tartan is both a mass noun ("12 metres of tartan") and a count noun ("12 different tartans").

Today, tartan refers to coloured patterns, though originally did not have to be made up of a pattern at all, as it referred to the type of weave; as late as the 1820s, some tartan cloth was described as "plain coloured ... without pattern". Patterned cloth from the Gaelic-speaking Scottish Highlands was called breacan, meaning 'many colours'. Over time, the meanings of tartan and breacan were combined to describe a certain type of pattern on a certain type of cloth.

=== Sett ===
The pattern of a particular tartan is called its sett. The sett is made up of a series of lines at specific widths which cross at right angles and blend into each other; the longer term setting is occasionally used. Sett can refer to either the minimal visual presentation of the complete tartan pattern or to a textual representation of it (in a thread count).

=== Modern Terminology ===
Today tartan is used more generally to describe the pattern, not limited to textiles, appearing on media such as paper, plastics, packaging, and wall coverings.

==== Plaid ====
In North America, the term plaid is commonly used to refer to tartan. (Note: The use of plaid to mean 'tartan' has not been exclusively North American; in 1808, the London publication La Belle Assemblée referred to "plaid scarfs". Also, it has sometimes been claimed that plaid refers to all such patterns generally, and tartan only to patterns of Scottish clans, but there is no support for this idea in works of tartan scholarship.) Plaid, derived from the Scottish Gaelic plaide meaning 'blanket', (Note: MacBain (1911), p. 277. Cognate words in other languages are the Luwian pldtmn and later Latin paludamentum for 'cloak'. The paludamentum was a cloak put on by Roman officers in time of war.) was first used of any rectangular garment, sometimes made up of tartan, (Note: Solid-colour, non-tartan kilts were often thought to be an Irish invention of the late 19th century, but an example of a belted plaid or "great kilt" from Scotland was found in a 1635 portrait of Sir Duncan Campbell of Loch Awe, among other Scottish examples.) which could be worn several ways: the belted plaid (breacan féile) or "great kilt" which preceded the modern kilt; the arisaid (earasaid), a large shawl that could be wrapped into a dress; and several types of shoulder cape, such as the full plaid and fly plaid. In time, plaid was used to describe blankets themselves. In former times, the term plaiding or pladding was sometimes used to refer to tartan cloth.

== Weaving and design ==
=== Weaving construction ===
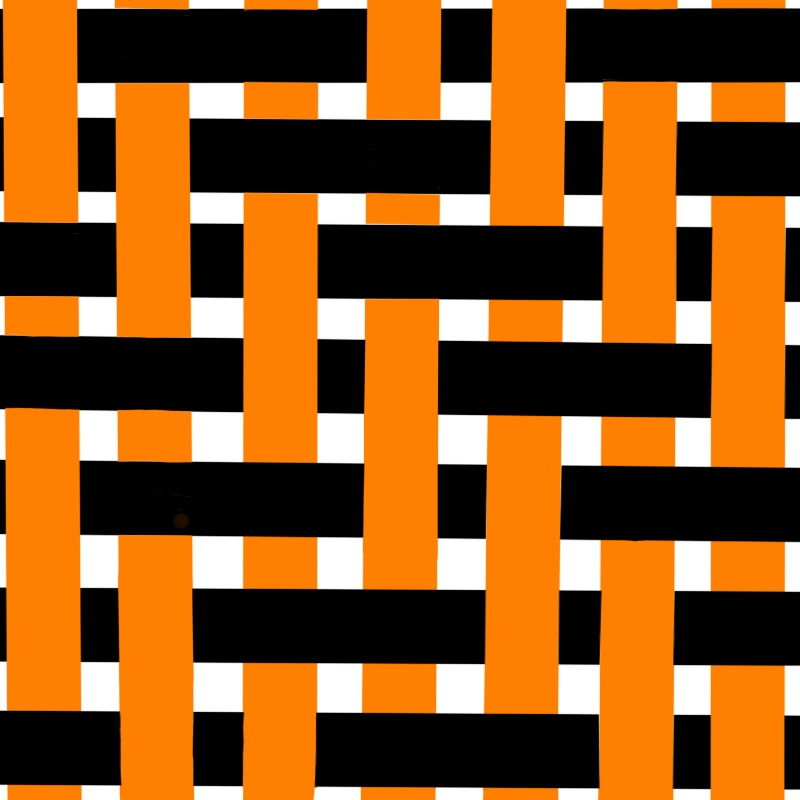
Visualisation of 2/2 twill weave: the black weft threads go two over then two under the orange warp threads, staggered by one thread each pass (resulting in a diagonal pattern). In the actual cloth, the white gaps would be closed.

The Scottish Register of Tartans provides the following summary definition of tartan:

Tartan (the design) is a pattern that comprises two or more different solid-coloured stripes that can be of similar but are usually of differing proportions that repeat in a defined sequence. The sequence of the warp colours (long-ways threads) is repeated in same order and size in the weft (cross-ways threads). The majority of such patterns (or setts) are symmetrical, i.e. the pattern repeats in the same colour order and proportions in every direction from the two pivot points. In the less common asymmetric patterns, the colour sequence repeats in blocks as opposed to around alternating pivots but the size and colour sequence of warp and weft remain the same.

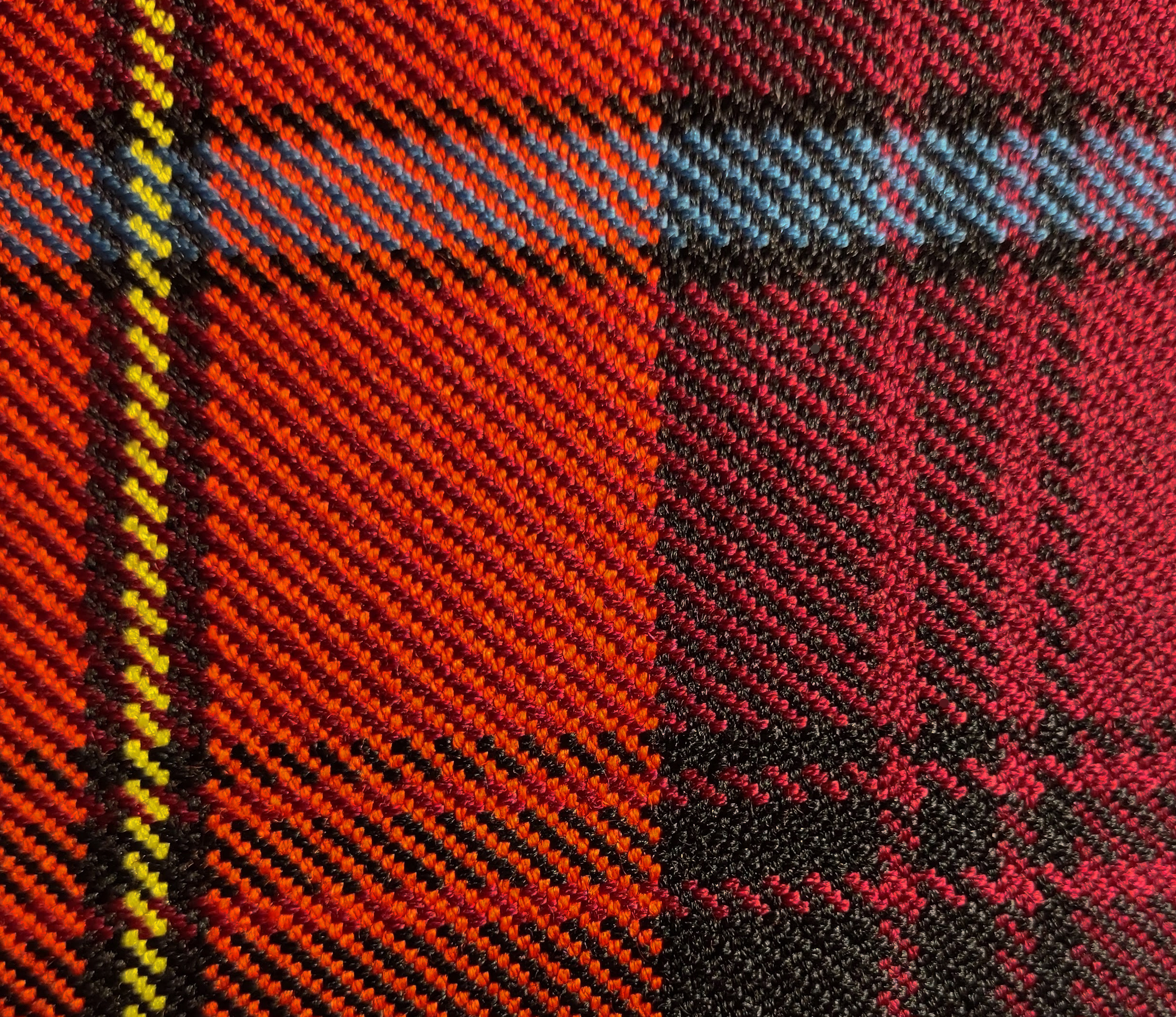
Close-up view of traditional tartan cloth, showing pattern of diagonal "ribs" of colour; this is a five-colour tartan, in scarlet red, black, yellow, azure blue, and crimson red.

In more detail, traditional tartan cloth is a tight, staggered 2/2 twill weave of worsted wool: the horizontal weft (also woof or fill) is woven in a simple arrangement of two-over-two-under the fixed, vertical warp, advancing one thread at each pass. As each thread in the weft crosses threads in the warp, the staggering by one means that each warp thread will also cross two weft threads. The result, when the material is examined closely, is a characteristic 45-degree diagonal pattern of "ribs" where different colours cross. Where a thread in the weft crosses threads of the same colour in the warp, this produces a solid colour on the tartan, while a weft thread crossing warp threads of a different colour produces an equal admixture of the two colours alternating, producing the appearance of a third colour – a halftone blend or mixture – when viewed from further back. (The effect is similar to multicolour halftone printing, or cross-hatching in coloured-pencil art.) Thus, a set of two base colours produces three different colours including one blend, increasing quadratically with the number of base colours; so a set of six base colours produces fifteen blends and a total of twenty-one different perceived colours. (Note: The two Scarlett sources provide two exact formulas which seem at first to be contradictory, but one is for number of blends and the other for number of colours total.) This means that the more stripes and colours used, the more blurred and subdued the tartan's pattern becomes. Unlike in simple checker (chequer) or dicing patterns (like a chessboard), no solid colour in a tartan appears next to another solid colour, only a blend (solid colours may touch at their corners).

James D. Scarlett (2008) offered a definition of a usual tartan pattern (some types of tartan deviate from the particulars of this definition):

The unit of tartan pattern, the sett, is a square, composed of a number of rectangles, square and oblong, arranged symmetrically around a central square. Each of these elements occurs four times, at intervals of ninety degrees, and each is rotated ninety degrees in relation to its fellows. The proportions of the elements are determined by the relative widths of the stripes that form them.

The sequence of thread colours in the sett (the minimal design of the tartan, to be duplicated – "the DNA of a tartan"), starts at an edge and either reverses or (rarely) repeats on what are called pivot points or pivots. In diagram A, the sett begins at the first pivot, reverses at the second pivot, continues, then reverses again at the next pivot, and will carry on in this manner horizontally. In diagram B, the sett proceeds in the same way as in the warp but vertically. The diagrams illustrate the construction of a typical symmetric (also symmetrical, reflective, reversing, or mirroring) (Note: The term mirroring can be ambiguous, because the longer phrase mirror pattern may refer to "one in which ... two alternating ground motifs are the same size and arrangement but in different colours.") tartan. However, on a rare asymmetric (asymmetrical, or non-reversing) (Note: The term repeating has also been used, as distinct from mirroring, but is so ambiguous that sometimes the same patterns are referred to as non-repeating. Neither term will be used further in this article.) tartan, the sett does not reverse at the pivots, it just repeats at them. (Note: A well-known example is the main Buchanan tartan.) An old term for the latter type is cheek or cheeck pattern. Also, some tartans (very few among traditional Scottish tartans) do not have exactly the same sett for the warp and weft. This means the warp and weft will have differing thread counts. (Note: An example is the most popular MacMillan tartan, in which the warp and weft are different, though similar; the largest blocks of colour are green rectangles instead of squares.) Asymmetric and differing-warp-and-weft patterns are more common in madras cloth and some other weaving traditions than in Scottish tartan.

Diagram A, the warp

Diagram B, the weft

Diagram C, the tartan. The combining of the warp and weft.

A tartan is recorded by counting the threads of each colour that appear in the sett. (Note: Early collectors of tartan, like Logan in 1831, recorded setts by measuring the width of each stripe in eighths of an inch. A persistent legend that tartans were originally recorded on little "pattern sticks" has been dispelled as a "telephone game"–style progressive, willful misunderstanding of an early description of the warp as wrapped on a warp beam/roller for the loom. It was poorly described by Martin Martin in 1703 as "an exact Pattern of the Plad on a piece of Wood", which Logan (1831) misunderstood as a small stick used as a perpetual "record" of the tartan pattern on it, after which the "Sobieski Stuarts" in 1842 blatantly falsified a supposed 16th-century description of "pattern sticks", and Archibald Campbell (1890) repeated the story again as factual. No such artefact has ever been found by modern researchers, and the idea has been described as impractical because the threads would not stay put indefinitely, and it would make much more sense to simply write or draw the pattern on paper, or keep a strip of the woven material. Mackay (1924) claimed he had seen some examples and appeared to describe warp beams, but then claimed they were used as a long-term record of "clan tartans" of the area. Eslea MacDonald (2015) points out that Mackay had a tendency toward "manipulating the evidence" when advancing his ideas about very old clan tartans, and that he made up a fake-Gaelic name for the alleged pattern sticks.) The thread count (or threadcount, thread-count) not only describes the width of the stripes on a sett, but also the colours used (typically abbreviated). Usually every number in a thread count is an even number to assist in manufacture. The first and last threads of the thread count are the pivots. A thread count combined with exact colour information and other weaving details is referred to as a ticket stamp or simply ticket.

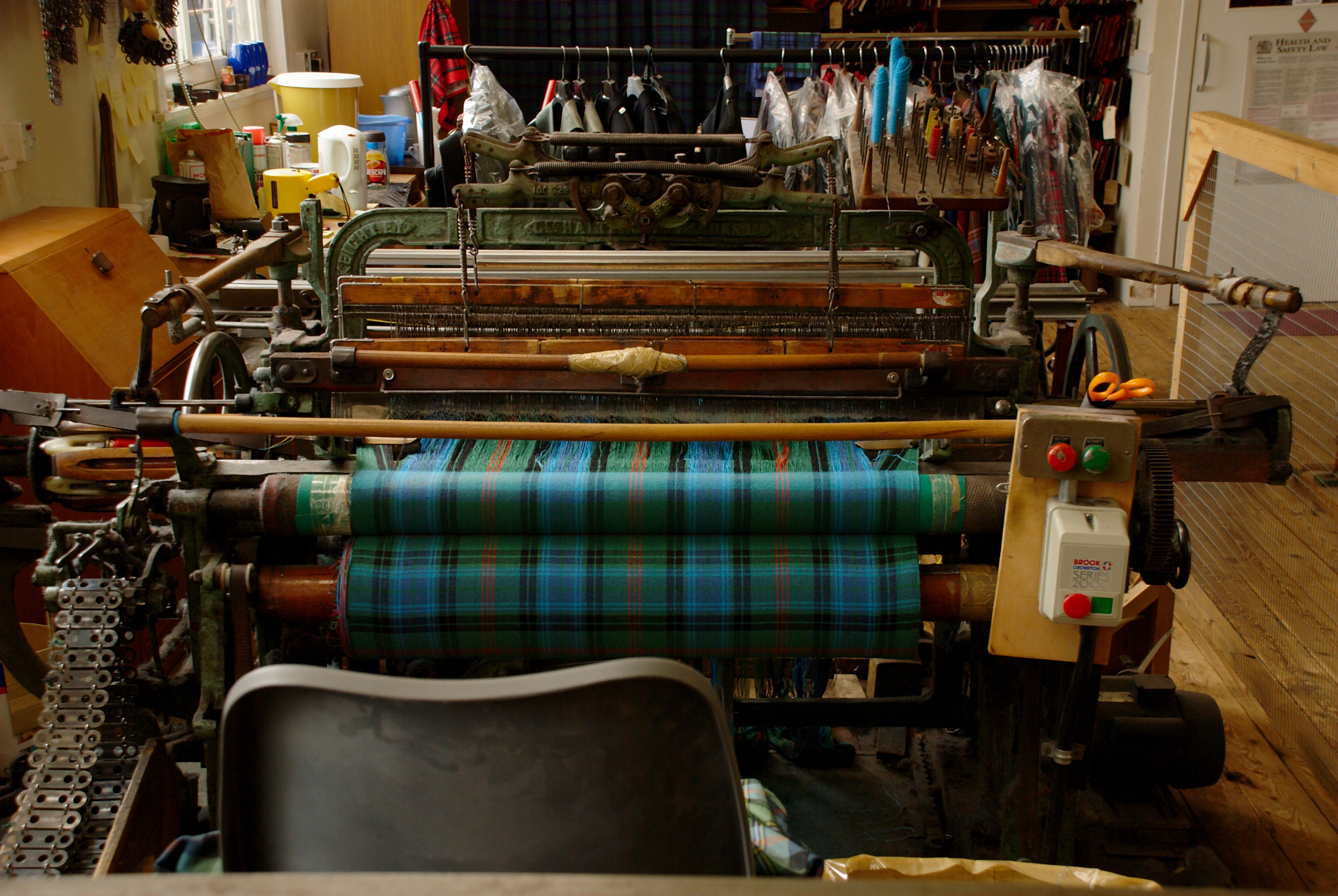
Tartan weaving in Lochcarron, Scottish Highlands

There is no universally standardised way to write a thread count, but the different systems are easy to distinguish. As a simple example:

- The thread count "/K4 R24 K24 Y4/" corresponds to a mirroring pattern of 4 black threads, 24 red threads, 24 black threads, 4 yellow threads, in which the beginning black and ending yellow pivots are not repeated (after Y4/, the colours are reversed, first K24 then R24); this is a "full-count at the pivots" thread count.
  - An equivalent notation is boldfacing the pivot abbreviations: K4 R24 K24 Y4.
- The same tartan could also be represented as "K/2 R24 K24 Y/2", in markup that indicates that the leading black and trailing yellow are duplicated before continuing from these pivot points (after Y/2, the colours are reversed as Y/2 again, then K24, then R24); this is a "half-count at the pivots" thread count.
- In the older and potentially ambiguous style of thread-counting, without the "/" (or bold) notation, a thread count like "K4 R24 K24 Y4" is assumed to be full-count at the pivots, unless the author clearly indicates otherwise. (Note: For example, Stewart, D. C. (1974), Scarlett (1990), and Scottish Register of Tartans (2009–) all use full-count-at-pivots "bare" thread counts, without slash or bold notation, while Eslea MacDonald (2012) uses them to represent half-count-at-pivots, but states this explicitly.)

In all of these cases, the result is a half-sett thread count, which represents the threading before the pattern mirrors and completes; a full-sett thread count for a mirroring (symmetric) tartan is redundant. A "/" can also be used between two colour codes (e.g. "W/Y24" for "white/yellow 24") to create even more of a shorthand threadcount for simple tartans in which half of the half-sett pattern is different from the other only in the way of a colour swap; but this is not a common style of thread-counting.

- An asymmetric tartan, one that does not mirror, would be represented in a full-sett thread count with "..." markup, as "...K4 R24 K24 Y4..." (after Y4, the entire pattern would begin again from K4).

Various writers and tartan databases do not use a consistent set of colour names and abbreviations, so a thread count may not be universally understandable without a colour key/legend. Some recorders prefer to begin a thread count at the pivot with the colour name (or abbreviation) that is first in alphabetical order (e.g. if there is a white pivot and a blue one, begin with blue), but this is actually arbitrary.

Though thread counts are quite specific, they can be modified depending on the desired size of the tartan. For example, the sett of a tartan (e.g., 6 inches square – a typical size for kilts) may be too large to fit upon the face of a necktie. In this case, the thread count would be reduced in proportion (e.g. to 3 inches to a side). In some works, a thread count is reduced to the smallest even number of threads (often down to 2) required to accurately reproduce the design; in such a case, it is often necessary to up-scale the thread count proportionally for typical use in kilts and plaids.

Before the 19th century, tartan was often woven with thread for the weft that was up to 1/3 thicker than the fine thread used for the warp, which would result in a rectangular rather than square pattern; the solution was to adjust the weft thread count to return the pattern to square, or make it non-square on purpose, as is still done in a handful of traditional tartans. Uneven warp-and-weft thread thickness could also contribute to a striped rather than checked appearance in some tartan samples.

The predominant colours of a tartan (the widest bands) are called the under-check (or under check, undercheck, under-cheque); sometimes the terms ground, (Note: Ground in this sense dates to at least 1895. Telfer Dunbar (1979), pp. 112–113, quoting 1895 letter: "... dress Stuart tartan on a white instead of on a red ground .... the 'Stuart hunting-tartan' on a green ground". However, ground has a different meaning at the thread-dyeing stage, where it refers to a first layer of colour which is then over-dyed with another, either to deepen the hue or make a new ones, e.g. purple from blue over red.) background, or base are used instead, especially if there is only one dominant colour. Thin, contrasting lines are referred to as the over-check (also over-stripe or overstripe). Over-checks in pairs are sometimes referred to as tram lines, tramlines, or tram tracks. Bright over-checks are sometimes bordered on either side (usually both), for extra contrast, by additional thin lines, often black, called guard lines or guards. Historically, the weaver William Wilson & Son of Bannockburn sometimes wove bright over-checks in silk, to give some added shine (commercially around 1820–30, but in regimental officers' plaids back to at least 1794). (Note: Wilsons, the near-exclusive producer of Georgian through Victorian regimental tartan, produced different grades of cloth for officers, sergeants, and enlisted.) Tartan used for plaids (not the belted plaid) often have a purled fringe.

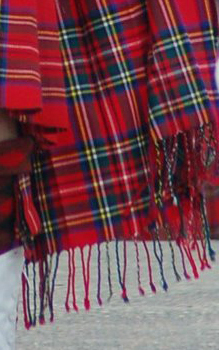
Zoom-in on a bagpiper's full plaid (royal Stuart tartan), showing the purled fringe style typical for such garments

An old-time practice, to the 18th century, was to add an accent on plaids or sometimes kilts in the form of a selvedge in herringbone weave at the edge, 1–3 inches (2.5–7.6 cm) wide, but still fitting into the colour pattern of the sett; a few modern weavers will still produce some tartan in this style. Sometimes more decorative selvedges were used: Selvedge marks were borders (usually on one side only) formed by repeating a colour from the sett in a broad band (often in herringbone), sometimes further bordered by a thin strip of another colour from the sett or decorated in mid-selvedge with two thin strips; these were typically used for the bottoms of belted plaids and kilts, and were usually black in military tartans, but could be more colourful in civilian ones. The more elaborate selvedge patterns were a wider series of narrow stripes using some or all of the colours of the sett; these were almost exclusively used on household tartans (blankets, curtains, etc.), and on two opposing sides of the fabric. The very rare total border is an all-four-sides selvedge of a completely different sett; described by Peter Eslea MacDonald (2019) as "an extraordinarily difficult feature to weave and can be regarded as the zenith of the tartan weaver's art", it only survives in Scottish-style tartan as a handful of 18th-century samples (in Scotland and Nova Scotia, Canada, but probably all originally from Scotland). The style has also been used in Estonia in the weaving of suurrätt shawls/plaids.

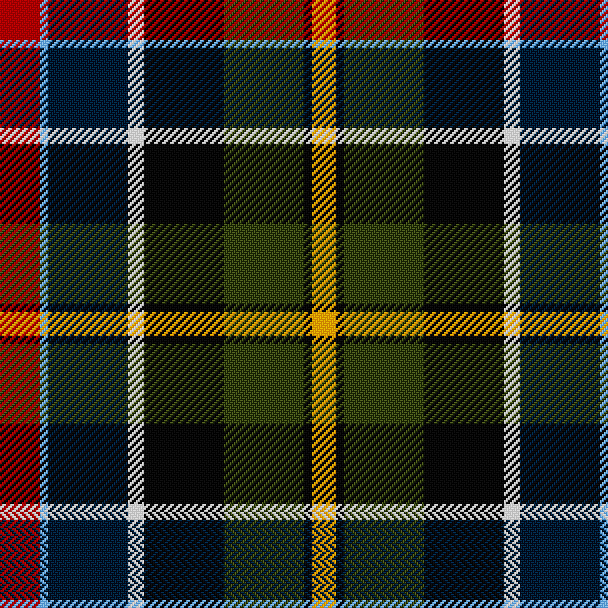
18th-century tartan with a herringbone selvedge at the bottom

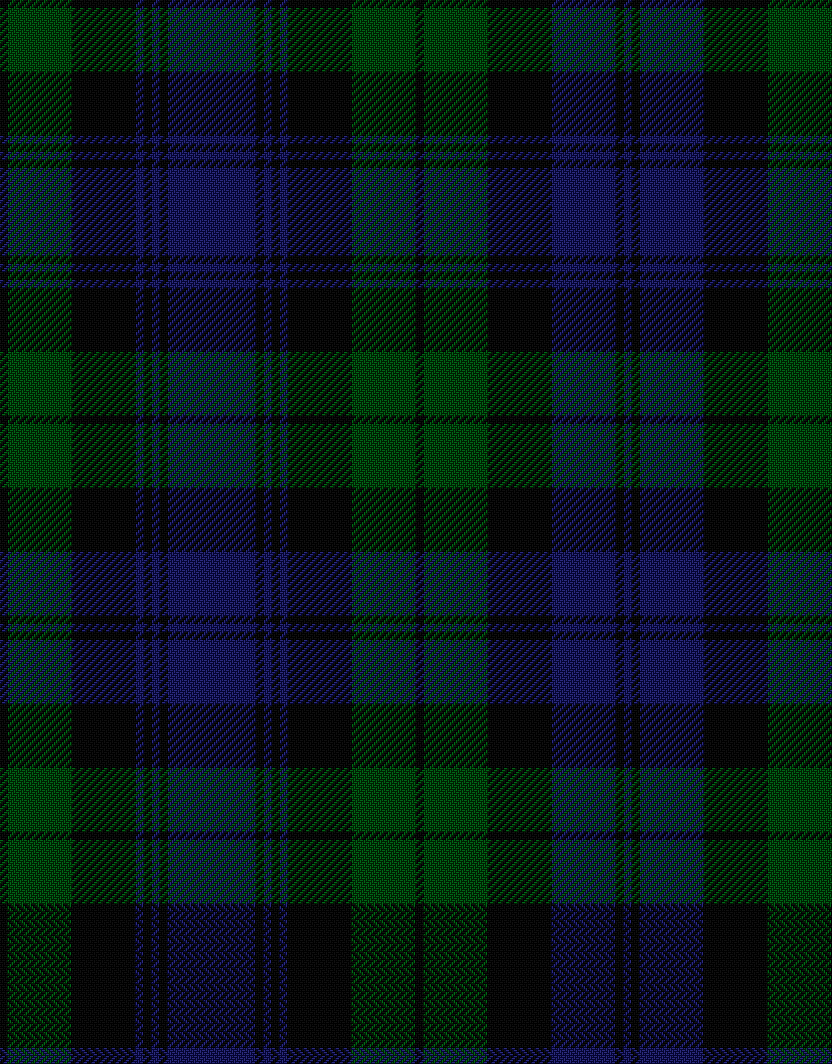
Black Watch tartan with a selvedge mark at the bottom (also herringbone)

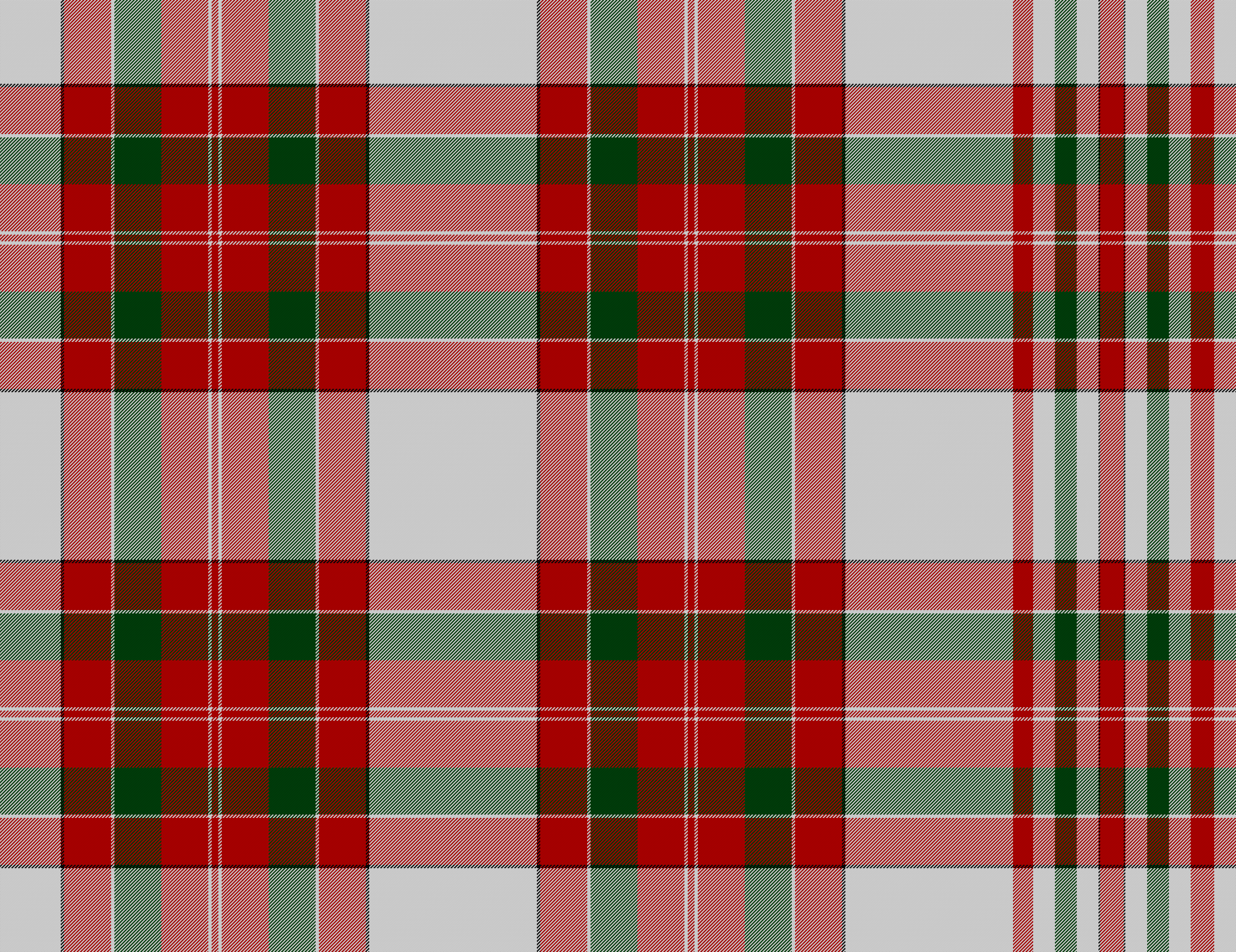
Wilsons 1819 blanket tartan with a selvedge pattern on the right

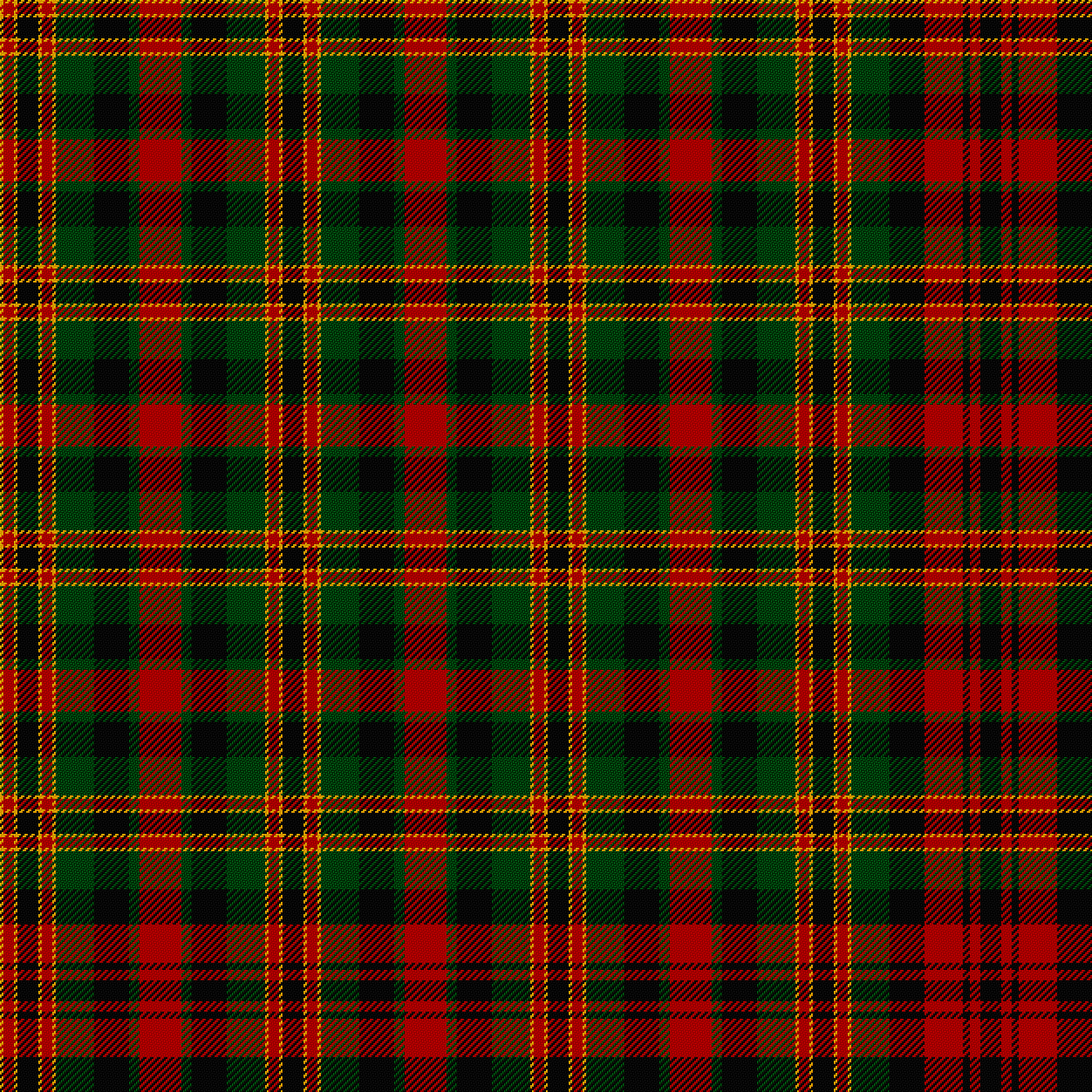
Bottom-right corner of blanket with total border selvedge; approximation based on photo of real blanket discovered in Nova Scotia, but probably Scottish, c. 1780s

Tartan is usually woven balanced-warp (or just balanced), repeating evenly from a pivot point at the centre outwards and with a complete sett finishing at the outer selvedge; e.g. a piece of tartan for a plaid might be 24 setts long and 4 wide. An offset, off-set, or unbalanced weave is one in which the pattern finishes at the edge in the middle of a pivot colour; this was typically done with pieces intended to be joined (e.g. for a belted plaid or a blanket) to make larger spans of cloth with the pattern continuing across the seam; if the tartan had a selvedge mark or selvedge pattern, it was at the other side of the warp.

The term hard tartan refers to a version of the cloth woven with very tightly wound, non-fuzzy thread, producing a comparatively rougher and denser (though also thinner) material than is now typical for kilts. It was in common use up until the 1830s. There are extant but uncommon samples of hard tartan from the early 18th century that use the more intricate herringbone instead of twill weave throughout the entire cloth.

While modern tartan is primarily a commercial enterprise on large power looms, tartan was originally the product of rural weavers of the pre-industrial age, and can be produced by a dedicated hobbyist with a strong, stable hand loom. Since around 1808, the traditional size of the warp reed for tartan is 37 inches (94 cm), the length of the Scottish ell (previous sizes were sometimes 34 and 40 inches). Telfer Dunbar (1979) describes the setup thus:

The reed varies in thickness according to the texture of the material to be woven. A thirty-Porter (which contains 20 splits of the reed) or 600-reed, is divided into 600 openings in the breadth of 37 inches. Twenty of these openings are called a Porter and into each opening are put two threads, making 1,200 threads of warp and as many of weft in a square yard of tartan through a 30-Porter reed.

Splits are also referred to as dents, and Porters are also called gangs.

=== Styles and design principles ===
Traditional tartan patterns can be divided into several style classes. The most basic is a simple two-colour check of thick bands (with or without thin over-checks of one or more other colours). A variant on this splits one or more of the bands, to form squares of smaller squares instead of just big, solid squares; a style heavily favoured in Vestiarium Scoticum. A complexity step up is the superimposed check, in which a third colour is placed centrally "on top of" or "inside" (surrounded by) one of the base under-check colours, providing a pattern of nested squares, which might then also have thin, bright and/or black over-checks added. Another group is multiple checks, typically of two broad bands of colour on a single dominant "background" (e.g. red, blue, red, green, red – again possibly with contrasting narrow over-checks). The aforementioned types can be combined into more complex tartans. In any of these styles, an over-check is sometimes not a new colour but one of the under-check colours "on top of" the other under-check. A rare style, traditionally used for arisaid (earasaid) tartans but no longer in much if any Scottish use, is a pattern consisting entirely of thin over-checks, sometimes grouped, "on" a single ground colour, usually white. M. Martin (1703) reported that the line colours were typically blue, black, and red. Examples of this style do not survive, at least not in the tartan databases (there may be preserved museum pieces with such patterns). (Note: Scarlett (1990) provided a reconstruction of what 17th- to early 18th-century arisaid tartans probably basically looked like, based on the appearance of later wider-banded "bar blanket" tartans which evolved from the arisaid setts. His sample is modernised in being simplified, symmetrical, mirroring, and not having a decorative selvedge.) Some tartan patterns are more abstract and do not fit into any of these styles, especially in madras cloth.

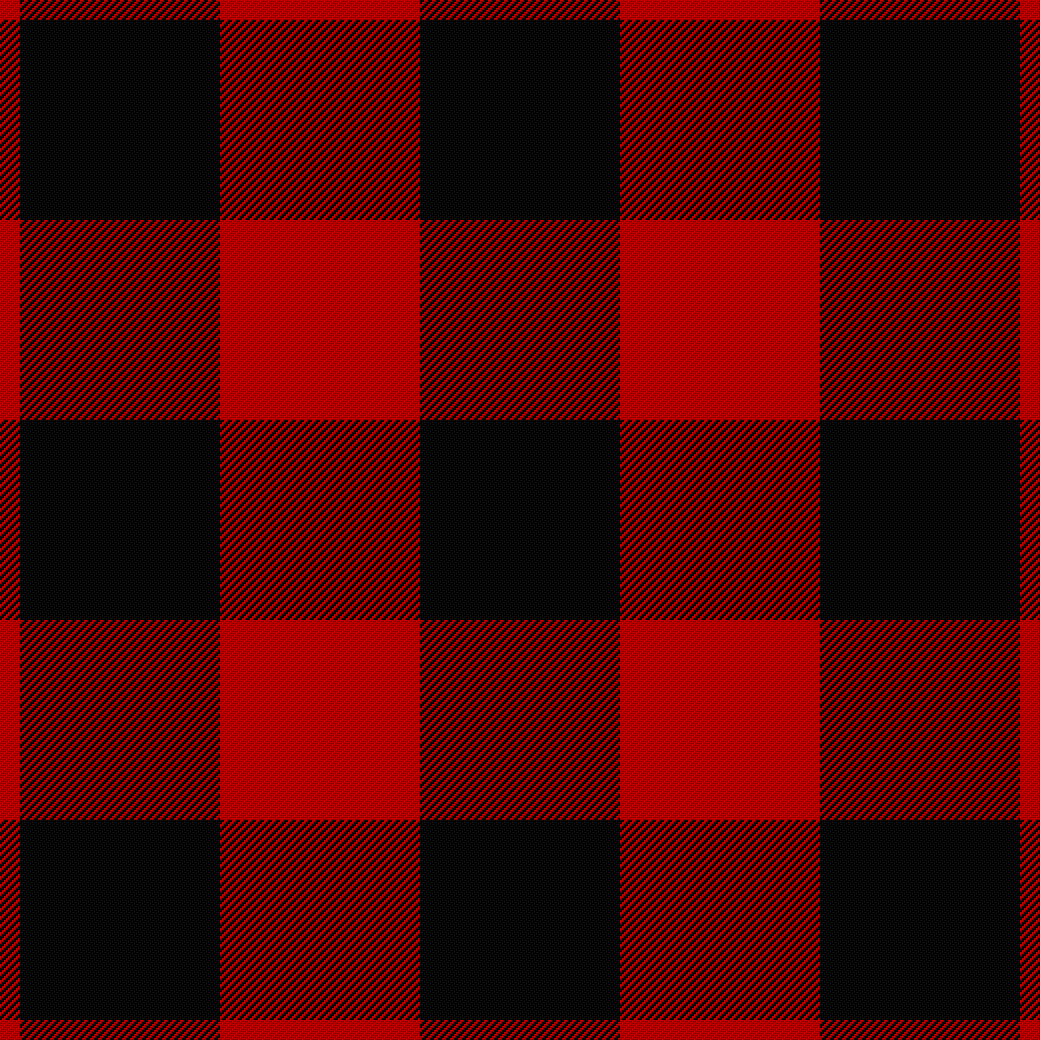
Most basic check – MacGregor red-and-black (Rob Roy), as simple as it gets: equal proportions of two colours.

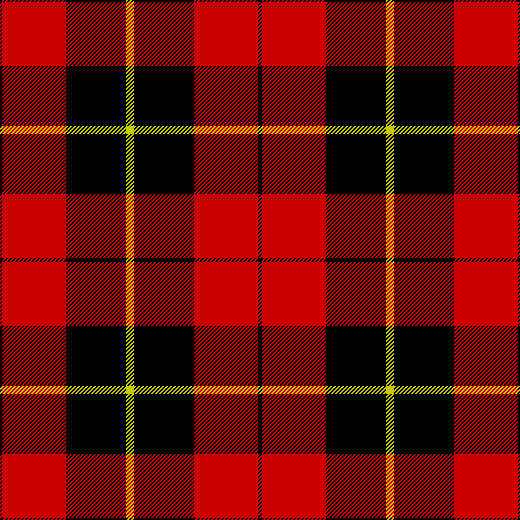
Basic check modified – Wallace red/dress, black on a slightly larger ground of red, laced with yellow and black over-checks.

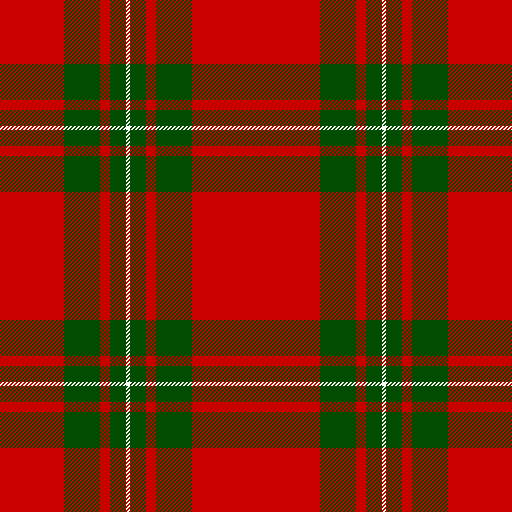
Split check – MacGregor red-and-green with a wide green band split into three to form a "square of squares", then laced with a white over-check.

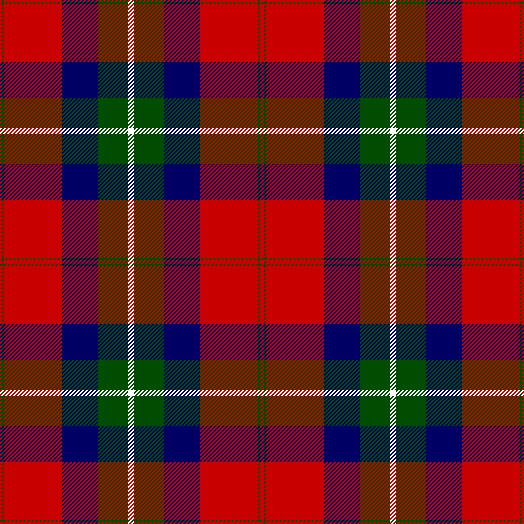
Superimposed check – Ruthven, a red ground with a big green stripe "inside" a bigger blue one, then white and green over-checks.

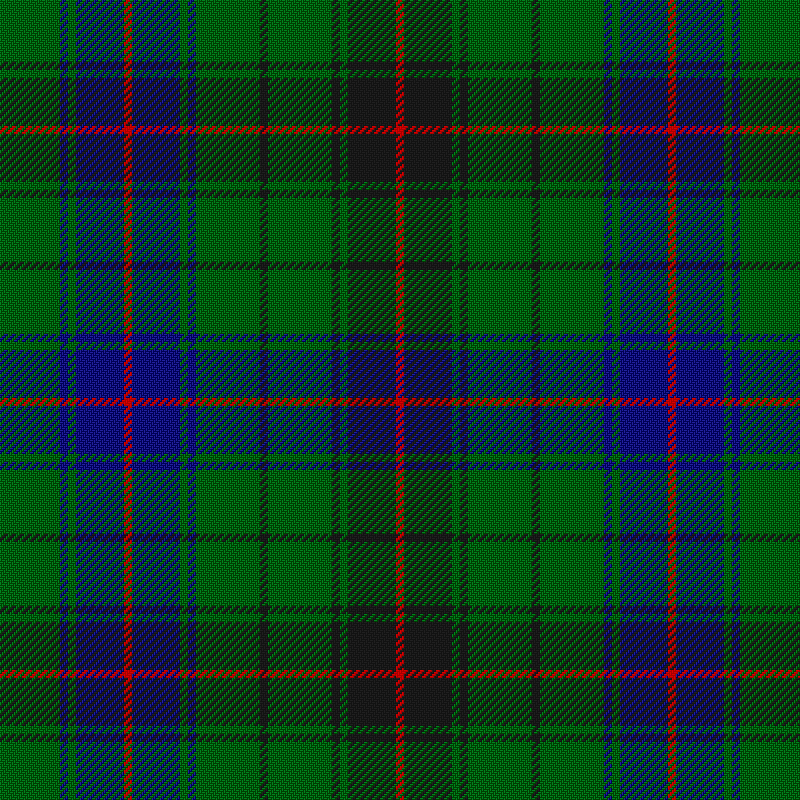
Multiple checks – Davidson, a green ground with equal blue and black bands, then with red, blue, and black over-checks.

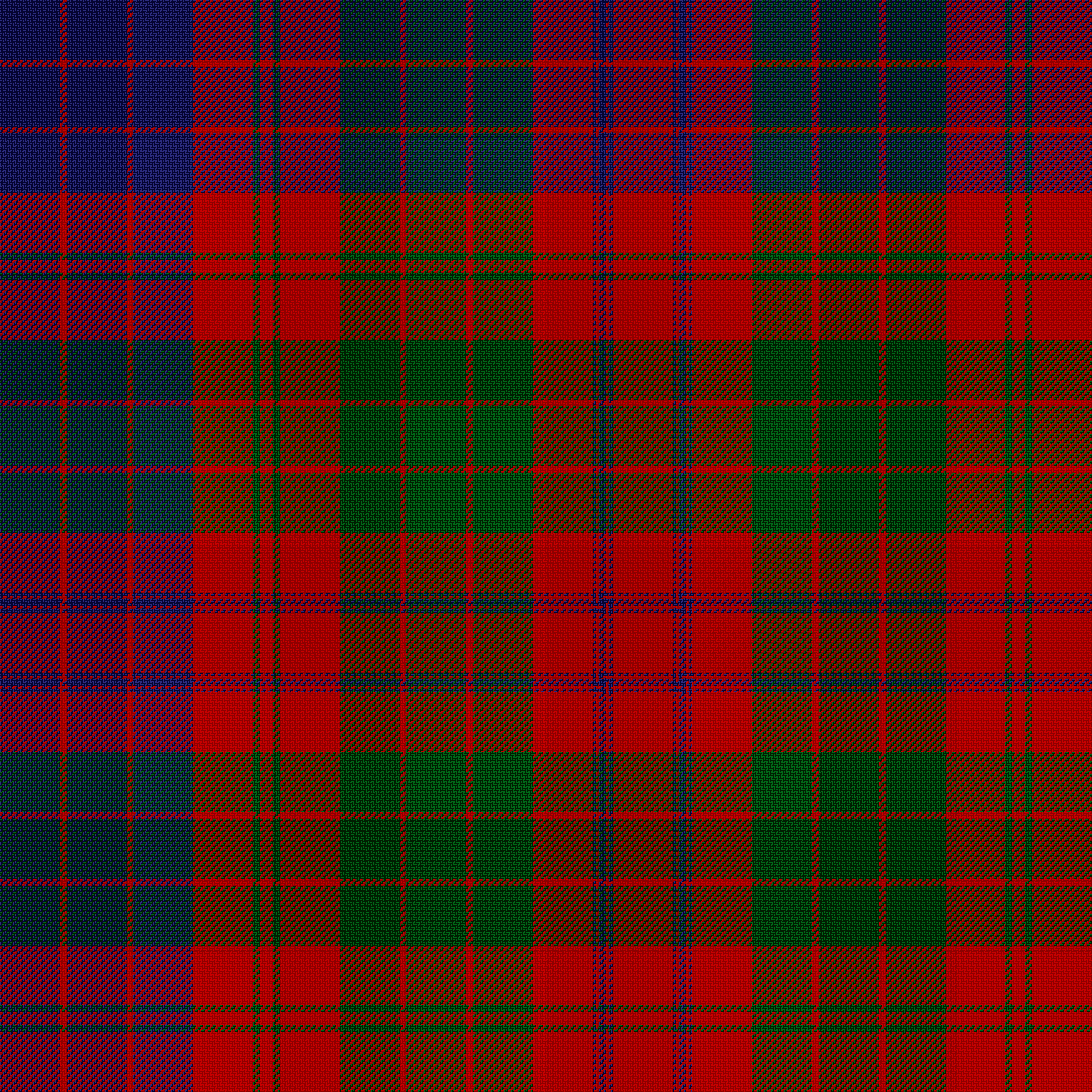
Complex example – Ross, combines split-check and multiple-check styles, with one blue and two green split checks on red, with blue and green over-checks.

There are no codified rules or principles of tartan design, but a few writers have offered some considered opinions. Banks & de La Chapelle (2007) summarized, with a view to broad, general tartan use, including for fashion: "Color – and how it is worked – is pivotal to tartan design.... Thus, tartans should be composed of clear, bright colors, but ones sufficiently soft to blend well and thereby create new shades." James D. Scarlett (2008) noted: "the more colours to begin with, the more subdued the final effect", or put more precisely, "the more stripes to the sett and the more colours used, the more diffuse and 'blurred' the pattern". That does not necessarily translate into subtlety; a tartan of many colours and stripes can seem "busy".

Scarlett (2008), after extensive research into historical Highland patterns (which were dominated by rich red and medium green in about equal weight with dark blue as a blending accent – not accounting for common black lines), suggested that for a balanced and traditional style:

any basic tartan type of design should have for its background, a "high impact" colour and two others, of which one should be the complement to the first and the other a darker and more neutral shade; other colours, introduced to break up the pattern or as accents, should be a matter of taste. It is important that no colour should be so strong as to "swamp" another; otherwise, the blending of colours at the crossing will be adversely affected. ... Tartan is a complex abstract art-form with a strong mathematical undertone, far removed from a simple check with a few lines of contrasting colours scattered over it.

Scarlett (1990) provided a more general explanation, traditional styles aside:

Colours for tartan work require to be clear and unambiguous and bright but soft, to give good contrast of both colour and brightness and to mix well so as to give distinctly new shades where two colours cross without any one swamping another.

Further, Scarlett (1990) held that "background checks will show a firm but not harsh contrast and the overchecks will be such as to show clearly" on the under-check (or "background") colours. He summed up the desired total result as "a harmonious blend of colour and pattern worthy to be looked upon as an art form in its own right".

Omitting traditional black lines has a strong softening effect, as in the 1970s Missoni fashion ensemble and in many madras patterns. A Scottish black-less design (now the Mar dress tartan) dates to the 18th century; another is Ruthven (1842,), and many of the Ross tartans (e.g. 1886,), as well as several of the Victorian–Edwardian MacDougal[l] designs, are further examples. Various modern tartans also use this effect, e.g. Canadian Maple Leaf (1964,). Clever use of black or another dark colour can produce a visual perception of depth.

=== Colour, palettes, and meaning ===
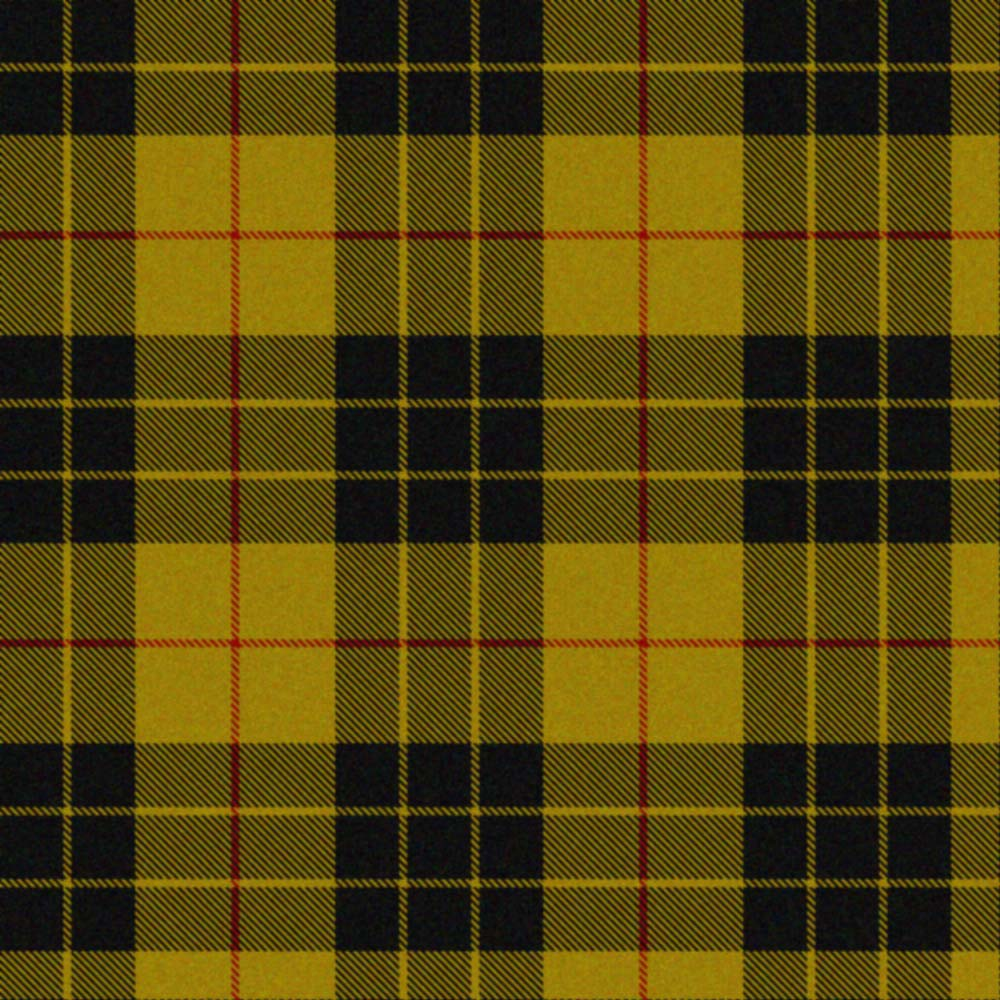
The brighter of the MacLeod tartans, known affectionately as the "loud MacLeod", in the saturated modern palette.

There is no set of exact colour standards for tartan hues; thread colour varies from weaver to weaver even for "the same" colour. A certain range of general colours, however, are traditional in Scottish tartan. These include blue (dark), crimson (rose or dark red), green (medium-dark), black, grey (medium-dark), purple, red (scarlet or bright), tan/brown, white (actually natural undyed wool, called lachdann in Gaelic), (Note: The French term écru has also been applied, but is ambiguous, as it technically refers to the colour of undyed linen not wool, and has been taken to indicate a richer, sandy range of hues in English usage than in French.) and yellow. (Note: The Lord Lyon's colour-coding system actually had three reds: "gules/scarlet", "red" (a dull red), and "crimson". But it is not entirely clear what the difference between them is.) Some additional colours that have been used more rarely are azure (light or sky blue), maroon, and vert (bright or grass green), plus light grey (as seen in Balmoral tartan, though it is sometimes given as lavender). Since the opening of the tartan databases to registration of newly designed tartans, including many for organisational and fashion purposes, a wider range of colours have been involved, such as orange and pink, which were not often used (as distinct colours rather than as renditions of red) in old traditional tartans. (Note: Multiple hues of pink appear in Wilsons' colour lists around the early 19th century, which included colours for wool and other weaving, but orange does not.) The Scottish Register of Tartans uses a long list of colours keyed to hexadecimal "Web colours", sorting groups of hues into a constrained set of basic codes (but expanded upon the above traditional list, with additional options like dark orange, dark yellow, light purple, etc.). This helps designers fit their creative tartan into a coding scheme while allowing weavers to produce an approximation of that design from readily stocked yarn supplies.

In the mid-19th century, the natural dyes that had been traditionally used in the Highlands (Note: For lists of such natural dye materials and their preparation, see: Kok, Annette (1979) [1962]. "Appendix: Early Scottish Highland Dyes"". In Dunbar, John Telfer (ed.). History of Highland Dress. London: B. T. Batsford Ltd. pp. 222–240. Some additional such information is available in: Mackay (1924), pp. 59–64; and Eslea MacDonald (2012), pp. 76–77. See also: Campbell, J. F. (1893), p. 335.) (like various lichens, alder bark, bilberry, cochineal, heather, indigo, woad, and yellow bedstraw) began to be replaced by artificial dyes, which were easier to use and were more economic for the booming tartan industry, though also less subtle. Although William Morris in the late-19th-century Arts and Crafts movement tried to revive use of British natural dyes, most were so low-yield and so inconsistent from locality to locality (part of the reason for the historical tartan differentiation by area) that they proved to have little mass-production potential, despite some purple dye (cudbear) commercialisation efforts in Glasgow in the 18th century. The hard-wound, fine wool used in tartan weaving was rather resistant to natural dyes, and some dye baths required days or even weeks. The dyeing also required mordants to fix the colours permanently, usually metallic salts like alum; there are records from 1491 of alum being imported to Leith, though not necessarily all for tartan production in particular. Some colours of dye were usually imported, especially red cochineal and to some extent blue indigo (both expensive and used to deepen native dyes), from the Low Countries, with which Scotland had extensive trade since the 15th century. Aged human urine (called fual or graith) was also used, as a colour-deepener, a dye solubility agent, a lichen fermenter, and a final colour-fastness treatment. All commercially manufactured tartan today is coloured using artificial not natural dyes, even in the less saturated colour palettes.

The hues of colours in any established tartan can be altered to produce variations of the same tartan. Such varying of the hues to taste dates to at least the 1788 pattern book of manufacturer William Wilson & Son of Bannockburn. Today, the semi-standardised colour schemes or palettes (what marketers might call "colourways") are divided generally into modern, ancient, muted, and weathered (sometimes with other names, depending on weaver). These terms only refer to relative dye "colourfulness" saturation levels and do not represent distinct tartans.

Modern
Also known as ordinary; refers to darker tartan, with fully saturated colours. In a modern palette, setts made up of blue, black, and green tend to be obscured because of the darkness of the colours in this scheme.
Ancient
Also known as old colours (OC); refers to a lighter palette of tartan. These hues are ostensibly meant to represent the colours that would result from natural-dyed fabric aging over time. However, the results are not accurate (e.g., in real examples of very old tartan, black often fades toward khaki or green while blue remains dark; and natural dyes are capable of producing some very vibrant colours in the first place, though not very consistently). This style originated in the first half of the 20th century. This ancient is not to be confused with the same word in a few names of tartans such as "ancient Campbell".
Weathered
Also called faded; refers to tartan that is even lighter (less saturated) than ancient, as if exposed for a very long time. This style was invented in the late 1940s.
Muted
Refers to tartan which is between modern and ancient in vibrancy. Although this type of colouring is very recent, dating only from the early 1970s, these hues are thought to be the closest match to the colours attained by natural dyes used before the mid-19th century.

Some particular tartan mills have introduced other colour schemes that are unique to that weaver and only available in certain tartans. Two examples are Lochcarron's antique, between modern and ancient; and D. C. Dalgliesh's reproduction, a slight variation on weathered, dating to the 1940s and claimed to be based on 18th-century samples.

A general observation about ancient/old, weathered/faded, and muted are that they rather uniformly reduce the saturation of all colours, while actual natural-dyed tartan samples show that the historical practice was usually to pair one or more saturated colours with one or more pale ones, for greater clarity and depth, a "harmonious balance". According to Scarlett (1990): "The colours were clear, bright and soft, altogether unlike the eye-searing brilliance or washed-out dullness of modern tartans".

The same tartan in the same palette from two manufacturers will not precisely match; there is considerable artistic license involved in exactly how saturated to make a hue.

Tartan-generation software can approximate the appearance of a tartan in any of these palettes. The examples below are all the "Prince Charles Edward Stuart" tartan:

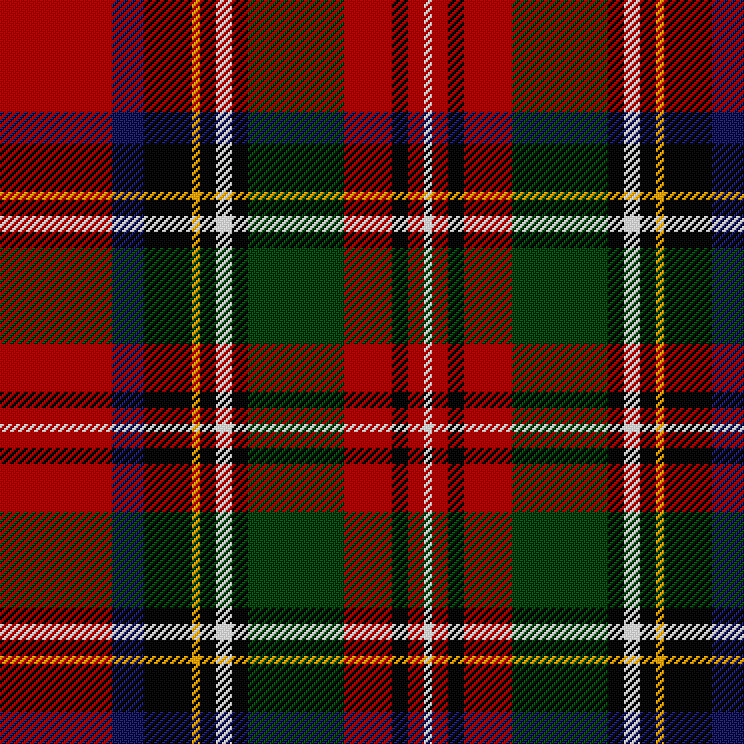
Modern palette

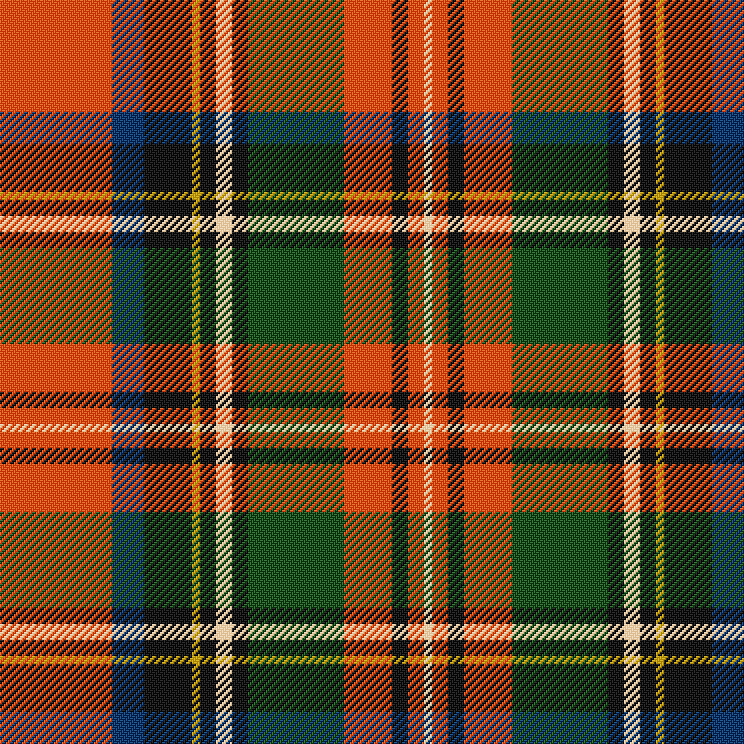
Ancient or old colours palette

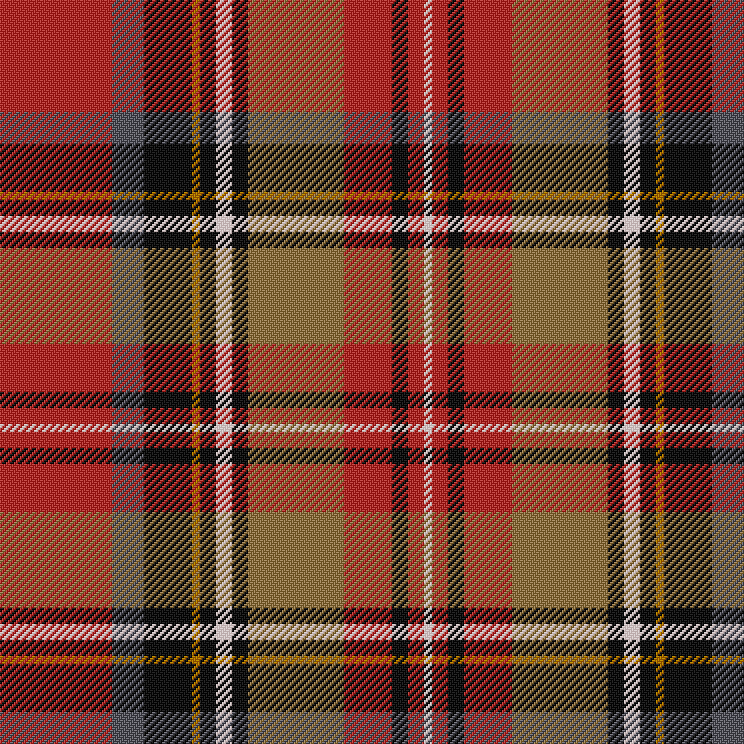
Weathered or faded palette

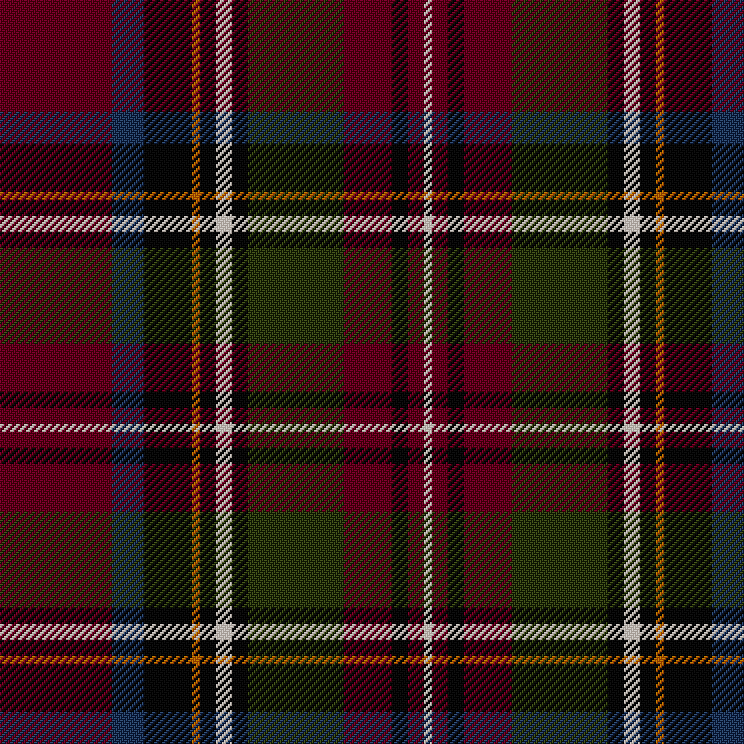
Muted palette

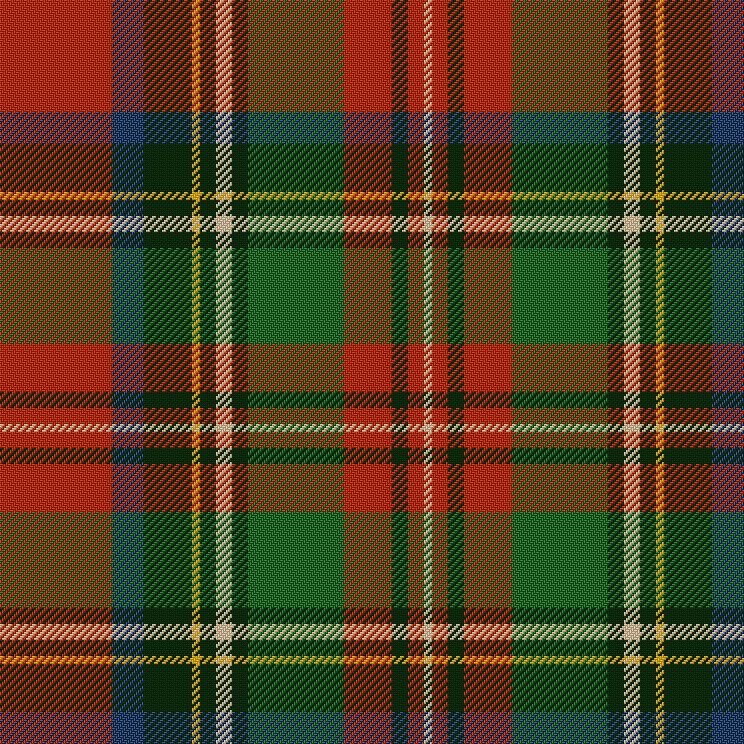
Lochcarron-style antique palette

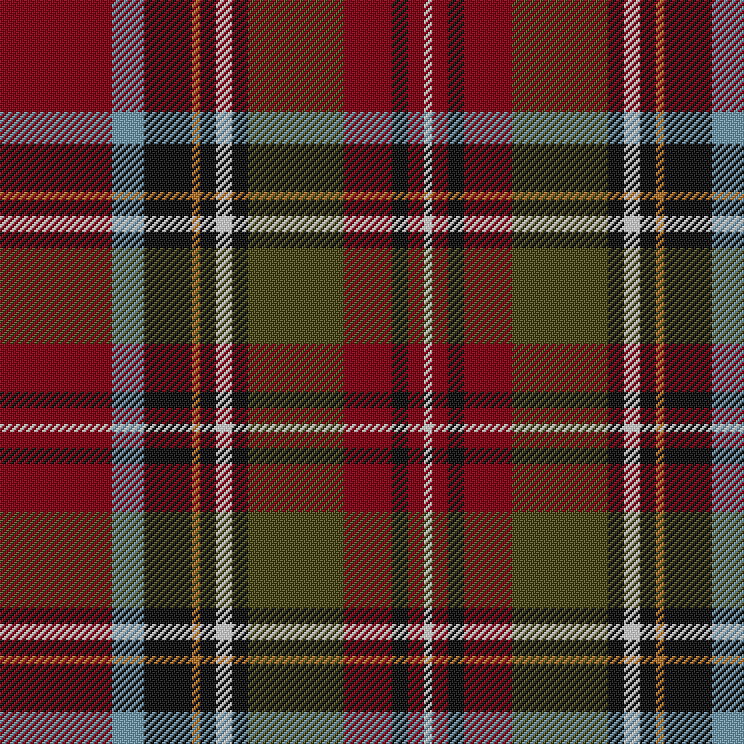
D. C. Dalgliesh-style reproduction palette

Scottish tartans that use two or more hues of the same basic colour are fairly rare. The best known is the British royal family's Balmoral (1853, two greys, both as under-check). Others include: Akins (1850, two reds, one as over-check and sometimes rendered purple), MacBean (1872, two reds, one as over-check and sometimes rendered purple), Childers Universal regimental (1907, two greens, both under-check), Gordon red (recorded 1930–1950 but probably considerably older; two blues and two reds, one of each used more or less as over-checks), Galloway district hunting/green (1939/1950s, two greens, both under-check), US Air Force Reserve Pipe Band (1988, two blues, both under-check), McCandlish (1992, three variants, all under-check), Isle of Skye district (1992, three greens, all arguably under-check, nested within each other), and Chisholm Colonial (2008, two blues, one an over-check, the other nearly blended into green). The practice is more common in very recent commercial tartans that have no association with Scottish families or districts, such as the Loverboy fashion label tartan (2018, three blues, one an over-check).

The idea that the various colours used in tartan have a specific meaning is purely a modern one, notwithstanding a legend that red tartans were "battle tartans", designed so they would not show blood. It is only recently created tartans, such as Canadian provincial and territorial tartans (beginning 1950s) and US state tartans (beginning 1980s), that are stated to be designed with certain symbolic meaning for the colours used. For example, green sometimes represents prairies or forests, blue can represent lakes and rivers, and yellow might stand for various crops. In the Scottish Register of Tartans (and the databases before it), colour inspiration notes are often recorded by a tartan's designer. However, there is no common set of tartan colour or pattern "motifs" with allusive meanings that is shared among designers. (Note: A romantic legend about such a thing goes back quite a way, however. According to Innes of Learney (1971): "The late J. G. Mackay, like Lord Archibald Campbell, claimed that clan tartans were not only deliberately arranged, but formed an elaborate system of identification by dress, as technical as armorial bearings .... [T]artans were never intended to, and did not, have the precise distinctions and ready recognisability of armorial bearings. Mr Mackay gives much interesting information ...; he does not, however, succeed in adducing evidence that there was a scientific system of arrangement, and circumstances are against the existence of a science." In summary, Mackay believed that lines of various colours formed a heraldic system of cadency (differencing) between related family branches. The argument depends on the Victorian-era clan tartans having been used in the 17th–18th centuries, but all modern tartan scholarship shows this idea to be broadly false.)

More abstractly, from an art criticism perspective, design historian Richard Martin (1988) wrote of tartans as designs and tartan as a textile class having no truly endemic or objectified meanings, but being an art that "has the property of being a vessel or container of meaning, a design form that exists not only in history but through history", capable of conveying radically different, even contradictory, contextual meanings "ever changing and evolving" through socio-cultural transmutation of the fabric's use. Thus tartan could veer from symbol of anti-union and Jacobite Highland rebellion to emblem of pan-British loyalty to empire in the space of two generations, or serve different fashion markets in the same recent decades as both a sartorial status symbol of traditional values and a punk and grunge rebel banner.

== Early history ==
=== Pre-medieval origins ===
Today, tartan is mostly associated with Scotland; however, the oldest tartan-patterned twill cloth ever discovered dates to a heterogenous culture of the Tarim Basin, c. 2100 BC through the first centuries AD in what today is Xinjiang, China, southeast of Kazakhstan. The tartan fabric (along with other types of simple and patterned cloth) was recovered, in excavations beginning in 1978, with other grave goods of the Tarim or Ürümqi mummies – a group of often Caucasoid (light-haired, round-eyed) bodies naturally preserved by the arid desert rather than intentionally mummified. The most publicised of them is the Chärchän Man, buried around 1,000 BC with tartan-like leggings in the Taklamakan Desert. Other twill tartan samples (with differing warp and weft) were recovered in the region from the site of Qizilchoqa in 1979, dating to around 1,200 BC; the material was woven with up to six colours and required a sophisticated loom (of a type that seems to have originated in the West). (Note: For a photograph of one of the Tarim cloth fragments and a reproduction of what the fabric may have originally looked like, see: Spada (2019).) Victor H. Mair, an archaeologist and linguist involved in the excavations wrote: "The ancient inhabitants ... undoubtedly had vibrant interactions with peoples of West Central Asia and even further west, since their magnificent textiles possess motifs, dyes, and weaves that are characteristic of cultures that lie in that direction."

Textile analysis of that fabric has shown it to be similar to that of ancient Europe. According to textile historian Elizabeth J. Wayland Barber, the late Bronze Age to early Iron Age people of Central Europe, the Hallstatt culture, which is linked with ancient Celtic populations and flourished between the 8th and 6th centuries BC, produced tartan-like textiles. Some of them were discovered in 2004, remarkably preserved, in the Hallstatt salt mines near Salzburg, Austria; they feature a mix of natural-coloured and dyed wool. (Note: For a photograph of one of the Salzburg cloth fragments, see: Belfrage, Anna (30 April 2016). "Of mummies in tartan". AnnaBelfrage.com.) Some date as early as 1200 BC, and Wayland Barber says of them that: "The overall similarities between Hallstatt plaid twills and recent Scottish ones, right down to the typical weight of the cloth, strongly indicate continuity of tradition. The chief difference is that the Hallstatt plaids contain no more than two colors". Similar finds have been made elsewhere in Central Europe and Scandinavia.

Classical Roman writers made various references to the continental Gauls, south of Britain, wearing striped or variegated clothing; Latin seems to have lacked an exact word for 'checked'. For example, Virgil in the Aeneid (29–19 BC, book VIII, line 660) described the Gauls as virgatis lucent sagulis (or sagalis) meaning something like 'they shine in striped cloaks' or 'their cloaks are striped brightly'. Other writers used words such as pictae and virgatae with translations like 'marled', 'variegated', 'particoloured', etc. Scarlett (1990) warns: "What is not reasonable is the ready assumption by many modern authors that every time one of these words, or something like it, was used, tartan was intended." It might have been intended sometimes, or the writer might have just meant linear stripes like seersucker cloth. Both Scarlett and Thompson (1992) decry the unsustainable assumption by a few earlier modern writers (e.g. James Grant, 1886) that Gauls must have been running around in clan tartans. The Romans particularly wrote of Gauls as wearing striped braccae (trousers). E. G. Cody, in remarks in his 1885 edition of John Lesley's Historie of Scotland, hypothesized that this was actually a Gaulish loanword and was cognate with Gaelic breacan. This is one of many "tartan legends" that is not well accepted; rather, braccae is considered by modern linguists a cognate of English breeches, Gaelic briogais ('trousers'), etc.

The earliest documented tartan-like cloth in Britain, known as the "Falkirk tartan", dates from the 3rd century AD. It was uncovered at Falkirk in Stirlingshire, Scotland, near the Antonine Wall. The fragment, held in the National Museum of Scotland, was stuffed into the mouth of an earthenware pot containing almost 2,000 Roman coins. The Falkirk tartan has a simple "Border check" design, of undyed light and dark wool. (Note: For a photograph of the Falkirk cloth fragment, see: "Record: Cloth (Fragment) – found at Falkirk Stirlingshire". NMS.Scran.ac.uk. National Museums Scotland. 2015.) Other evidence from this period is the surviving fragment of a statue of Roman Emperor Caracalla, once part of the triumphal arch of Volubilis completed in 217 AD. It depicts a Caledonian Pictish prisoner wearing tartan trews (represented by carving a checked design then inlaying it with bronze and silver alloys to give a variegated appearance). (Note: For a photograph of the Caracalla statue fragment, see (about 1/3 down the page): Lamley, Hamish (21 February 2022). "Pictish Fashion". PictaviaLeather.co.uk.) Based on such evidence, tartan researcher James D. Scarlett (1990) believes Scottish tartan to be "of Pictish or earlier origin", though Brown (2012) notes there is no way to prove or disprove this.

Early forms of tartan like this are thought to have been invented in pre-Roman times, and would have been popular among the inhabitants of the northern Roman provinces as well as in other parts of Northern Europe such as Jutland, where the same pattern was prevalent, and Bronze Age Sweden.

That twill weave was selected, even in ancient times, is probably no accident; "plain (2/2) twill for a given gauge of yarn, yields a cloth 50% heavier [denser] – and hence more weather-proof – than the simple 1/1 weave." According to Scarlett (2008):

[T]here are sound reasons why such a type of pattern-textile should have developed almost automatically in isolated, self-sufficient ... communities. Such communities are unlikely to possess large dye-vats, and so cannot piece-dye woven cloth; such processes as batik and tie-dye are unavailable. ... Stripes are the practical solution, since they use small quantities of a colour at a time and are interspersed with other colours, but the scope is limited ...; stripes across both brighten the colours and add many mixtures. From there on it is really only a matter of getting organised; the now-geometric pattern reduces to a small unit, easier to remember and to follow in a world where little was written down; it is further simplified by being split into two equal halves and, with weft as warp, the weft pattern can be followed from the warp.

=== Medieval ===
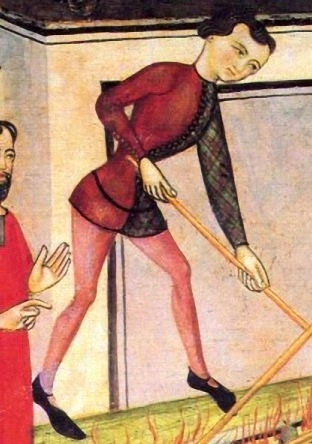
Detail of Catalan altarpiece by the "Master of Estamariu", late 14th century, showing a particoloured cotehardie with a three-colour, complex tartan

There is little written or pictorial evidence about tartan (much less surviving tartan cloth) from the medieval era. Tartan use in Britain between the 3rd-century Falkirk tartan and 16th-century samples, writings, and art is unclear. Cosmo Innes (1860) wrote that, according to medieval hagiographies, Scots of the 7th–8th centuries "used cloaks of variegated colour, apparently of home manufacture". Based on similarities of tartans used by various clans, including the Murrays, Sutherlands, and Gordons, and the history of their family interactions over the centuries, Thomas Innes of Learney estimated that a regional "parent" pattern, of a more general style, might date to the 12th or 13th century, but this is quite speculative. The cartularies of Aberdeen in the 13th century barred clergymen from wearing "striped" clothing, which could have referred to tartan.

In 1333, Italian Gothic artists Simone Martini and Lippo Memmi produced the Annunciation with St. Margaret and St. Ansanus, a wood-panel painting in tempera and gold leaf. It features the archangel Gabriel in a tartan-patterned mantle, with light highlights where the darker stripes meet, perhaps representing jewels, embroidery, or supplementary weaving. Art historians consider it an example of "Tartar" (Mongol) textile influence; it likely has no relation to Scottish tartan. (Note: Nor any relation to the modern Tatar people.) "Tartar" cloth came in a great array of patterns, many more complex than tartan (such as the fine detail in Gabriel's robe in the same painting); patterns of this sort were influential especially on Italian art in the 14th century.

There are several other continental European paintings of tartan-like garments from around this era (even back to the 13th century), but most of them show very simple two-colour basic check patterns, or (like the Martini and Memmi Annunciation example) broad squares made by thin lines of one colour on a background of another. Any of them could represent embroidery or patchwork rather than woven tartan. There seems to be no indication in surviving records of tartan material being imported from Scotland in this period. In the second half of the 14th century, the artist known only as the "Master of Estamariu" (in Catalonia, Spain) painted an altarpiece of St Vincent, one of the details of which is a man in a cotehardie that is red on one half and a complex three-colour tartan on the other, which is very similar to later-attested Scottish tartans.

Sir Francis James Grant, mid-20th-century Lord Lyon King of Arms, noted that records showed the wearing of tartan in Scotland to date as far back as 1440. However, it is unclear to which records he was referring, and other, later researchers have not matched this early date.

=== 16th century ===
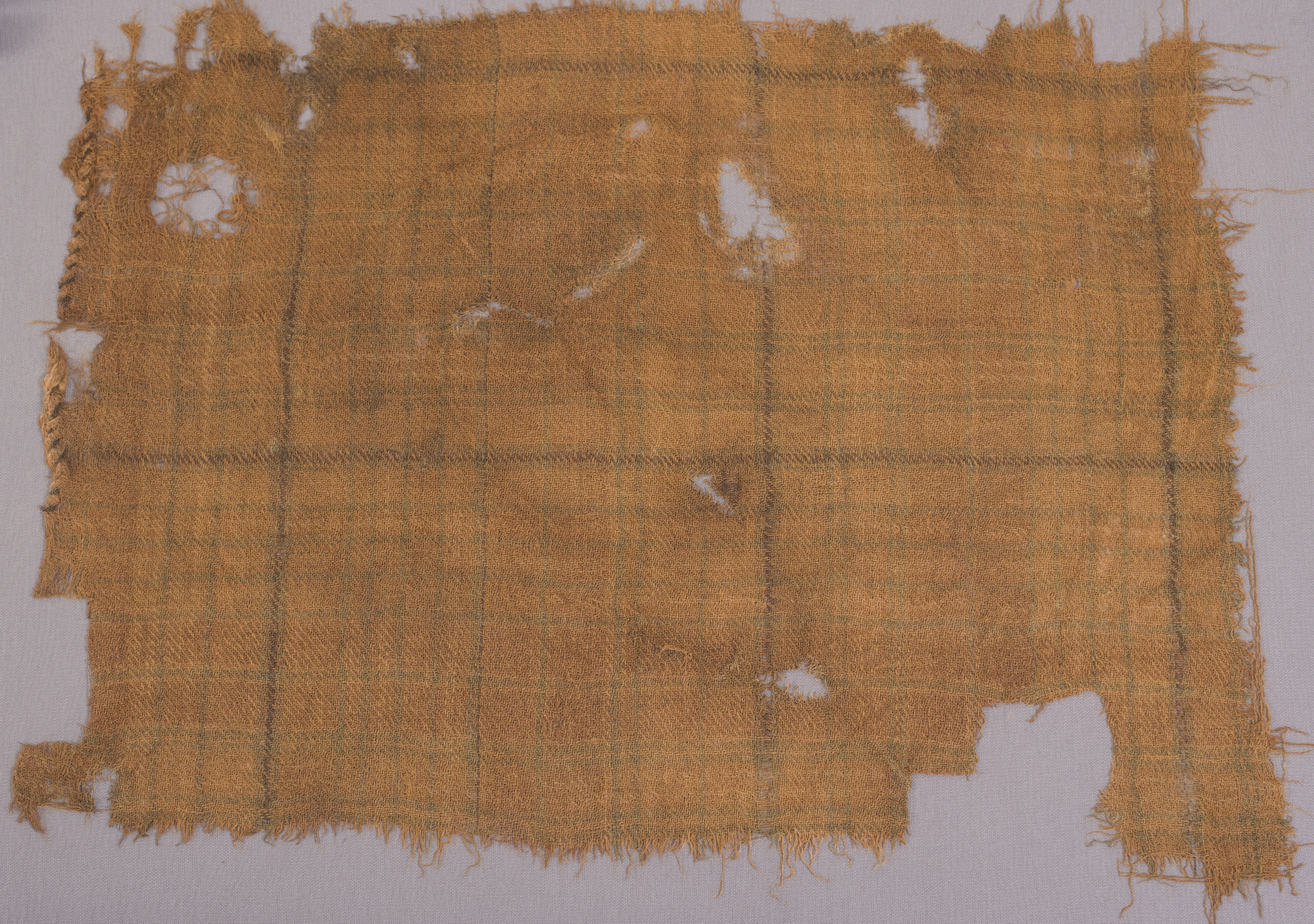
The Glen Affric tartan (c. 1500–1600 AD), discovered in a peat bog in the 1980s

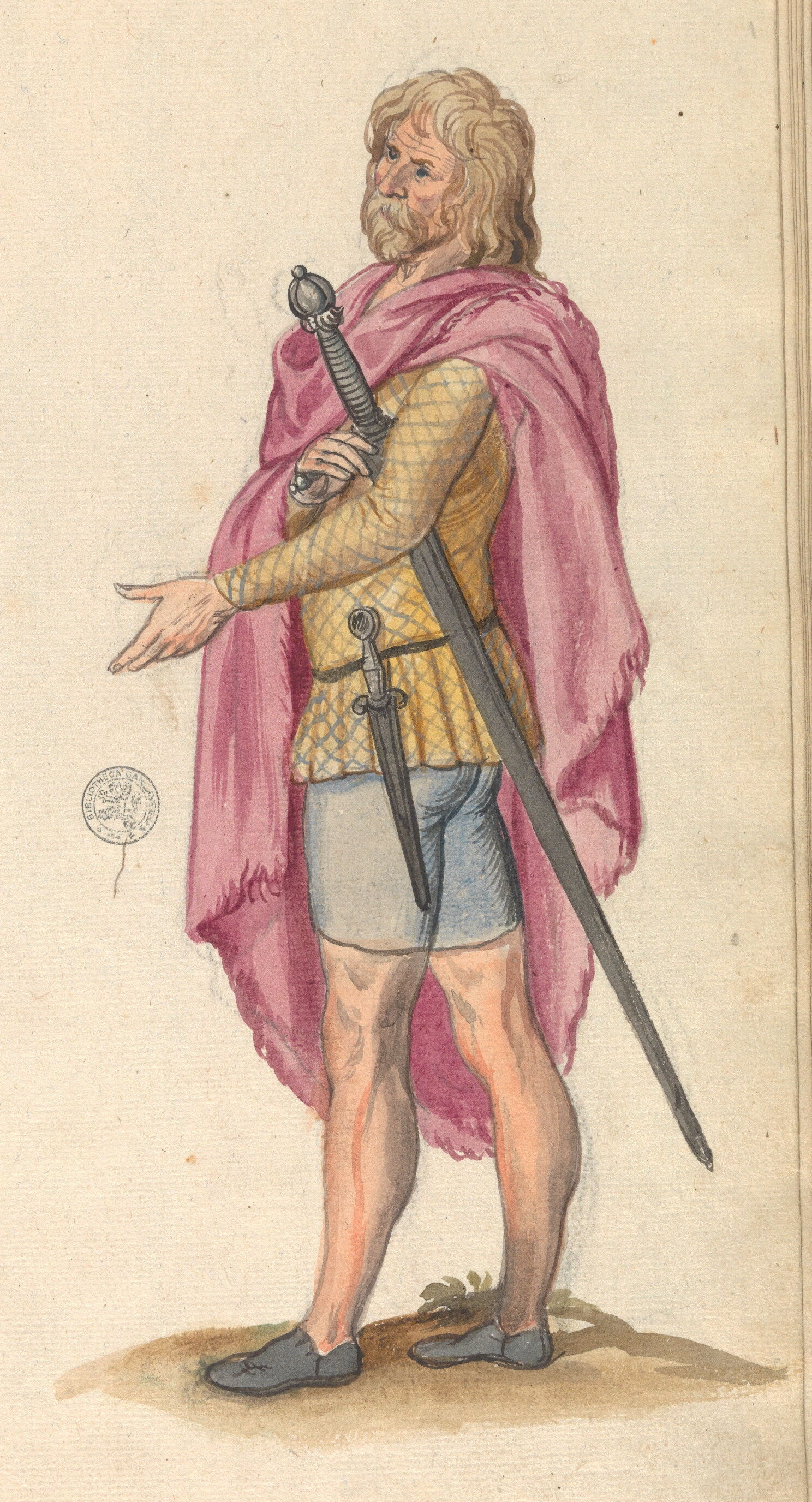
Éscossois sauvage ('Savage Scotsman') by Lucas de Heere, c. 1567–80

The oldest surviving sample of complex, dyed-wool tartan (not just a simple check pattern) in Scotland has been shown through radiocarbon dating to be from the 16th century; known as the "Glen Affric tartan", it was discovered in the early 1980s in a peat bog near Glen Affric in the Scottish Highlands; its faded colours include green, brown, red, and yellow. On loan from the Scottish Tartans Authority, the 55 cm × 42 cm (22 in × 17 in) artefact went on display at the V&A Dundee museum in April 2023. (Note: This historic Glen Affric tartan is not to be confused with various competing modern district tartans named "Glen Affic" available from some vendors such as Clan/Scotweb, Stevens & Graham, and Spoonflower.)

The earliest certain written reference to tartan by name is in the 1532–33 accounts of the Treasurer of Scotland: "Ane uthir tartane galcoit gevin to the king be the Maister Forbes" ('Another tartan coat given to the king by the Master Forbes'), followed not long after by a 1538 record of clothing made by Thomas Arthur for King James V of Scotland, which includes "heland tertane to be hoiss" ('Highland tartan to be hose'). (Note: There are possible mentions earlier, to the 14th century, in both Early Scots and Middle English using the French-borrowed terms tiretain and tartarin in various spellings, but they do not clearly refer to tartan, either the cloth or the pattern, but rather seem to refer to valued cloth in general.) Plaids were featured a bit earlier; poet William Dunbar (c. 1459 – c. 1530) mentions "Five thousand ellis ... Of Hieland pladdis". The earliest surviving image of a Highlander in what was probably meant to represent tartan is a 1567–80 watercolour by Lucas de Heere, showing a man in a belted, pleated yellow tunic with a thin-lined checked pattern, a light-red cloak, and tight blue shorts (of a type also seen in period Irish art), with claymore and dirk. It looks much like medieval illustrations of "Tartar" cloth and thus cannot be certain to represent true tartan. By the late 16th century, there are numerous references to striped or checked plaids. Supposedly, the earliest pattern that is still produced today (though not in continual use) is the Lennox district tartan, (also adopted as the clan tartan of Lennox) said to have been reproduced by D. W. Stewart in 1893 from a portrait of Margaret Douglas, Countess of Lennox, dating to around 1575. However, this seems to be legend, as no modern tartan researchers or art historians have identified such a portrait, and the earliest known realistic one of a woman in tartan dates much later, to c. 1700. Extant portraits of Margaret show her in velvet and brocade.

Tartan and Highland dress in the Elizabethan era have been said to have become essentially classless (Note: There is a legend that during some period there was a "caste" system by which chiefs were entitled to up to seven colours in a tartan, fewer colours were allowed for clansmen according to position in the social hierarchy, and just single-coloured cloth for servants. Barnes & Allen (1956) attributed the idea to Frank Adam (1908). He did indeed write that "it is said" there was such a system, but cited no evidence. The fancy is from Logan (1831), who cites nothing but an ancient "Achy Edgathach" of Ireland. That was a legendary ancient Irish king in the Lebor Gabála Érenn, said to have passed a sumptuary law limiting clothing colours by social status, during his very short reign of only four years (some time between 1537 and 1155 BC). It is old Irish folklore and nothing to do with history of Scottish tartan. Scarlett (1990): "it is difficult to allow such a tale any credibility". No modern Highland-dress scholars repeat it seriously (the last one to do so seems to have been Mackay (1924) who said it applied to "Druidical times"), and the idea is contradicted by existence of old regional tartans of complexity, and by chiefs adopting tartans of marked simplicity. Practically, the extra dye and weaving-labour expenses of complicated tartans meant that they cost more and so were more often worn by monied persons, as clearly reported by John Lesley (1578) and Robert Heron (1799).) – worn in the Highlands by everyone from high-born lairds to common crofters, at least by the late 16th century. The historian John Major wrote in 1521 that it was the upper class, including warriors, who wore plaids while the common among them wore linen, suggesting that woollen cloth was something of a luxury. But by 1578, Bishop John Lesley of Ross wrote that the belted plaid was the general Highland costume of both rich and poor, with the nobility simply able to afford larger plaids with more colours. (Later, Burt (1726) also wrote of gentlemen having larger plaids than commoners.) If colours conveyed distinction, it was of social class not clan. D. W. Stewart (1893) attributed the change, away from linen, to broader manufacture of woollen cloth and "the increased prosperity of the people".

Many writers of the period drew parallels between Irish and Highland dress, especially the wearing of a long yellow-dyed shirt called the léine or saffron shirt (though probably not actually dyed with expensive imported saffron), worn with a mantle (cloak) over it, and sometimes with trews. It is not entirely certain when these mantles were first made of tartan in the Highlands, but the distinctive cloth seems to get its recorded mentions first in the 16th century, starting with Major (1521). In 1556, Jean de Beaugué, a French witness of Scottish troops at the 1548 Siege of Haddington, distinguished Lowlanders from Highland "savages", and wrote of the latter as wearing dyed shirts "and a certain light covering made of wool of various colours". George Buchanan in 1582 wrote that "plaids of many colours" had a long tradition but that the Highland fashion by his era had mostly shifted to a plainer look, especially brown tones, as a practical matter of camouflage. (Note: Buchanan (1582): "They delight in marbled cloths, especially that have stripes of sundrie colours; they love chiefly purple and blue; their predecessors used short mantles or plaids of divers colours, sundrie ways divided, and among some the same custom is observed to this day, but for the most part they are brown, most near to the colour of the hadder [heather], to the effect, when they lie among the hadders, the bright colour of their plaids shall not bewray them." (Buchanan's wording was recycled in 1603, in the anonymous Certayn Mattere Concerning Scotland.)) Fynes Moryson wrote in 1598 (published 1617) of common Highland women wearing "plodan", "a course stuffe, of two or three colours in Checker worke".

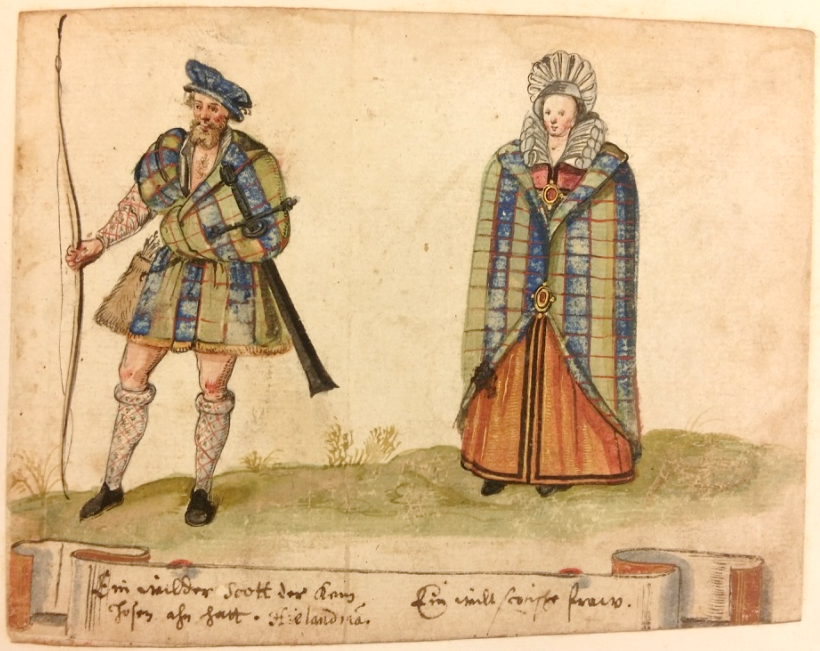
Highland man and woman in tartan, c. 1603–1616, by Hieronymus Tielsch. The crude attempt to represent tartan shows a blue and green pattern with red over-check, but did not blend the colours. (Note: The attempt to depict tartan is fairly crude, done as divided stripes, instead of a staggered pattern of blending rectangles, though it is possible it represents a weave with differing warp and weft, which could produce more of a striped pattern. The exact details shown in the image are open to other question, because the artist illustrated an imaginative sword that is a combination of a Scottish claymore hilt with the blade and quillions of a German Landsknecht sword of a type more familiar to the German (Silesian) artist. Also, Telfer Dunbar (1979) called the colours yellow, blue, and red (not green, blue, and red), so the palette accuracy of the photo could be in doubt. The original art is in Huntington Library MSS: HM 25863, f. 28r.)

Its dense weave requiring specialised skills and equipment, tartan was not generally one individual's work but something of an early cottage industry in the Highlands – an often communal activity called calanas, including some associated folk singing traditions – with several related occupational specialties (wool comber, dyer, waulker, warp-winder, weaver) among people in a village, part-time or full-time, especially women. (Note: There is a recurrent legend running through Victorian works on tartan that the tartan cloth for each Highland man was usually made at home singly by his wife or mother, but this proves to be an impractical idea, for which there is no evidence, and considerable evidence against, including rich folk tradition of (mostly women's) group labour.) The spinning wheel was a late technological arrival in the Highlands, and tartan in this era was woven from fine (but fairly inconsistent) hard-spun yarn that was spun by hand on drop spindles. The era's commerce in tartans was centred on Inverness, the early business records of which are filled with many references to tartan goods. Tartan patterns were loosely associated with the weavers of particular areas, owing in part to differences in availability of natural dyes, and it was common for Highlanders to wear whatever was available to them, often a number of different tartans at the same time. (Note: Innes of Learney (1938/1971) believed that Highlanders wore multiple tartans because some were personal (perhaps inherited), some geographical, and some clan-specific, but presented no real evidence for this hypothesis. The idea can be traced to Lord Archibald Campbell (1890), who asserted (with no evidence at all) that a Highlander wearing multiple tartans at once could be explained by him donning the pattern of his commander, his own paternal clan, and maternal clan.) The early tartans found in east-coastal Scotland used red more often, probably because of easier continental-European trade in the red dye cochineal, while western tartans were more often in blues and greens, owing to the locally available dyes. The greater expense of red dye may have also made it a status symbol. Tartan spread at least somewhat out of the Highlands, but was not universally well received. The General Assembly of the Kirk of Scotland in 1575 prohibited the ministers and readers of the church (and their wives) from wearing tartan plaids and other "sumptuous" clothing, while the council of Aberdeen, "a district by no means Highland", in 1576 banned the wearing of plaids (probably meaning belted plaids).

A 1594 Irish account by Lughaidh Ó Cléirigh of Scottish gallowglass mercenaries in Ireland clearly describes the belted plaid, "a mottled garment with numerous colours hanging in folds to the calf of the leg, with a girdle round the loins over the garment". The privately organised early "plantations" (colonies) and later governmental Plantation of Ulster brought tartan weaving to Northern Ireland in the late 16th to early 17th centuries. Many of the new settlers were Scots, and they joined the population already well-established there by centuries of gallowglass and other immigrants. In 1956, the earliest surviving piece of Irish tartan cloth was discovered in peaty loam just outside Dungiven in Northern Ireland, in the form of tartan trews, along with other non-tartan clothing items. It was dubbed the "Dungiven tartan" or "Ulster tartan". The sample was dated using palynology to c. 1590–1650 (the soil that surrounded the cloth was saturated with pollen from Scots pine, a species imported to Ulster from Scotland by plantationers). According to archaeological textile expert Audrey Henshall, the cloth was probably woven in County Donegal, Ireland, but the trews tailored in the Scottish Highlands at some expense, suggesting someone of rank, possibly a gallowglass. Henshall reproduced the tartan for a 1958 exhibit; it became popular (and heavily promoted) as a district tartan for Ulster (both in a faded form, like it was found, and a bright palette that attempted to reproduce what it may have originally looked like), and seems to have inspired the later creation of more Irish district tartans.. There is nearly nothing in period source material to suggest that the Irish also habitually wore tartan; one of the only sources that can possibly be interpreted in support of the idea is William Camden, who wrote in his Britannia (since at least the 1607 edition) that "Highlandmen ... wear after the Irish fashion striped mantles". (Note: Even this, however, is ambiguous, and could mean that the Highlanders wore striped mantles, and worse their mantles in the same fashion that the Irish wore their own mantles, striped or not. And "striped" does not necessarily mean tartan. The Camden material is also contemporaneous with the Plantation of Ulster.)

=== 17th century ===
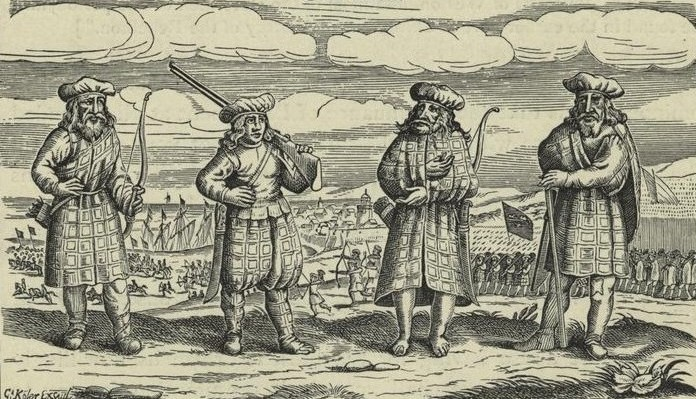
The earliest image of Scottish soldiers wearing tartan belted plaids and trews; 1631 German engraving by Georg Köler.

The earliest unambiguous surviving image of Highlanders in an approximation of tartan is a watercolour, dating to c. 1603–1616 and rediscovered in the late 20th century, by Hieronymus Tielsch or Tielssch. It shows a man's belted plaid, and a woman's plaid (arisaid, earasaid) worn as a shawl or cloak over a dress, and also depicts diced short hose and a blue bonnet. Clans had for a long time independently raised militias, and starting in 1603, the British government itself mustered irregular militia units in the Highlands, known as the Independent Highland Companies (IHCs). Being Highlanders, they were probably wearing tartan (1631 Highland mercenaries certainly were, and the ICHs were in tartan in 1709 and actual uniforms of tartan by 1725). Tartan was used as a furnishing fabric, including bed hangings at Ardstinchar Castle in 1605. After mention of Highlanders' "striped mantles" in Camden's Britannia of 1607, poet John Taylor wrote in 1618 in The Pennyless Pilgrimage of "tartane" Highland garb in detail (in terms that generally match what was described and illustrated even two centuries later); he noted that it was worn not just by locals but also by visiting British gentlemen. (Note: Taylor: " ... all and every man in generall in one habit .... For once in the yeere, ... many of the nobility and gentry of the kingdome (for their pleasure) doe come into these Highland countries to hunt, where they doe conforme themselves to the habite of the Highlandmen, who for the most part speake nothing but Irish [i.e. Gaelic] .... Their habite is shooes, with but one sole apiece; stockings (which they call short hose) made of a warm stuff of divers colours, which they call tartane; as for breeches, many of them, nor their forefathers, never wore any, but a jerkin of the same stuff that their hose is of; their garters being bands, or wreathes of hay or straw; with a plaed about their shoulders, which is a mantle of divers colours, much finer and lighter stuffe than their hose; with blue flat caps on their heads ....") (Note: Adam (1908/1970) makes the surprising claim that in Taylor's time, "any one who assumed the tartan of the clan was considered as being under the special protection of that clan" and implies that Taylor said this. Adam invented it, as nothing like this is in Taylor's original material. Taylor simply said that visitors wearing Highland dress would be "conquered with kindnesse, and the sport will be plentifull".) The council of Aberdeen again cracked down on plaids in 1621, this time against their use as women's head-wear, and the kirk in Glasgow had previously, in 1604, forbidden their wear during services; similar kirk session rulings appeared in Elgin in 1624, in Kinghorn in 1642 and 1644, and Monifieth in 1643, with women's plaids more literarily censured in Edinburgh in 1633 by William Lithgow. In 1622, the Baron Courts of Breadalbane set fixed prices for different complexities of tartan and plain cloth.

In 1627, a tartan-dressed body of Highland archers served under the Earl of Morton. More independent companies were raised in 1667. The earliest image of Scottish soldiers in tartan is a 1631 copperplate engraving by Georg Köler (1600–1638); it features Highland mercenaries of the Thirty Years' War in the forces of Gustavus Adolphus of Sweden. Not long after, James Gordon, Parson of Rothiemay, wrote in A History of Scots Affairs from 1637 to 1641 of the belted plaid as "a loose Cloke of several Ells, striped and party colour'd, which they gird breadthwise with a Leathern Belt ...." He also described the short hose and trews ("trowzes"). A 1653 map, Scotia Antiqua by Joan Blaeu, features a cartouche that depicts men in trews and belted plaid; the tartan is crudely represented as just thin lines on a plain background, and various existing copies are hand-coloured differently. Daniel Defoe, in Memoirs of a Cavalier (c. 1720) wrote, using materials that probably dated to the English Civil War, of Highlanders invading Northern England back in 1639 that they had worn "doublet, breeches and stockings, of a stuff they called plaid, striped across red and yellow, with short cloaks of the same".

Besides the formerly often-chastised wearing of head-plaids in church, women's dress was not often described (except in earlier times as being similar to men's). (Note: E.g. in the revised 1707 edition of Rev. James Brome's Travels over England, Scotland and Wales, is material partly adapted from Buchanan (1582): "They go habited in Mantles striped, or streaked with divers colours about the Shoulders, which they call Plodden, with a Coat girt close to their Bodies, and commonly are naked up their Legs, but wear Sandals upon the Soles of their Feet, and their Women go clad much after the same Fashion." This suggests a span of at least 1582–1707 of Highland fashion being rather consistent and unisex.) The Highland and island women's equivalent of the belted plaid was the arisaid (earasaid), a plaid that could be worn as a large shawl or be wrapped into a dress. Sir William Brereton had written in 1634–35 (published 1844) of Lowland women in Edinburgh that: "Many wear (especially of the meaner sort) plaids ... which is [sic] cast over their heads and covers their faces on both sides, and would reach almost to the ground, but that they pluck them up, and wear them cast under their arms." He also reported that women there wore "six or seven several habits and fashions, some for distinction of widows, wives and maids", including gowns, capes/cloaks, bonnets with bongrace veils, and collar ruffs, though he did not address tartan patterns in particular in such garments.

While tartan was still made in the Highlands as cottage industry, by 1655 production had centred on Aberdeen, made there "in greater plenty than [in] any other place of the nation whatsoever", though it was also manufactured in Glasgow, Montrose, and Dundee, much of it for export. In Glasgow at least, some of the trade was in tartan manufactured in the Highlands and the Hebrides and brought there for sale along with hides and other goods. Impressed by the trade in Glasgow, Richard Franck in his Northern Memoirs of 1658 wrote that the cloth was "the staple of this country". In 1662, the naturalist John Ray wrote of the "party coloured blanket which [Scots] call a plad, over their heads and shoulders", and commented that a Scotsman even of the lower class was "clad like a gentleman" because the habit in this time was to spend extraordinarily on clothing, a habit that seems to have gone back to the late 16th century. A Thomas Kirk of Yorkshire commented on trews, plaids, and possibly kilts of "plaid colour" in 1677; more material by Kirk was printed in the 1891 Early Travellers in Scotland edited by Peter Hume Brown, recording "plad wear" in the form of belted plaids, trews, and hose. A poem by William Cleland in 1678 had Scottish officers in trews and shoulder plaids, and soldiers in belted plaids. In 1689, Thomas Morer, an English clergyman to Scottish regiments, described Lowland women as frequently wearing plaids despite otherwise dressing mostly like the English.

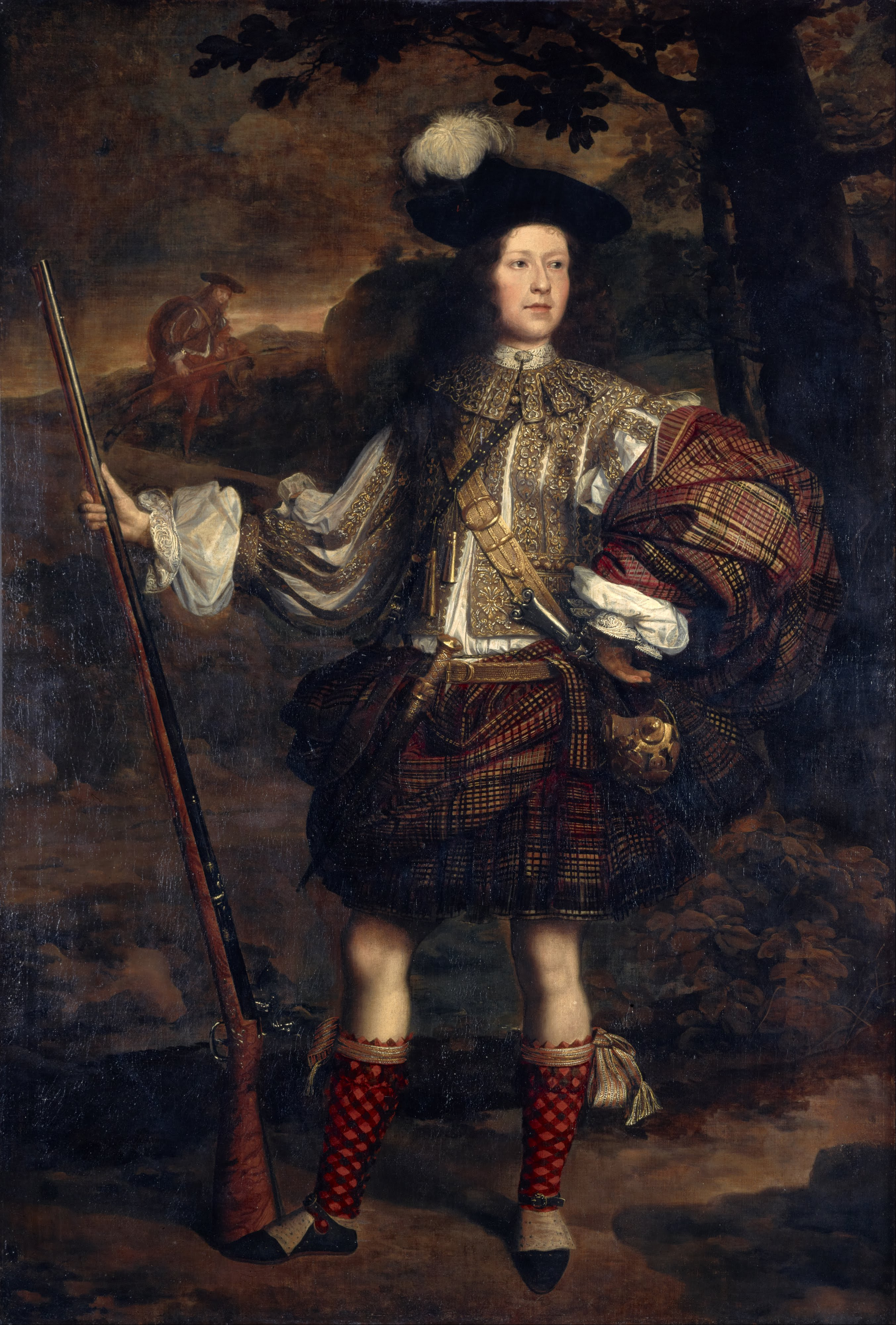
Mungo Murray, c. 1683, by John Michael Wright (Scottish National Portrait Gallery version), featuring a very complex tartan

The earliest known realistic portrait in tartan Highland dress is a piece (which exists in three versions) by John Michael Wright, showing a very complicated tartan of brown, black, and two hues of red; it is dated to c. 1683 and is of Mungo Murray, son of John Murray, Marquess of Atholl. (Note: The same artist earlier painted a three-in-one portrait of actor-playwright John Lacy, in 1675, which featured trews and belted plaid, but the tartan there is very casually represented as simple red and blue lines on white.)

In 1688, William Sacheverell, lieutenant governor of the Isle of Man, wrote of the tartan plaids of the women of Mull in the Inner Hebrides as "much finer, the colours more lively, and the squares larger than the men's .... This serves them for a veil, and covers both head and body." In the 1691 poem The Grameid, James Philip of Almerieclose described the 1689 Battle of Killiecrankie in terms that seem to suggest that some clan militias had uniform tartan liveries, and some historians have interpreted it thus.

=== 18th century ===
It is not until the early 18th century that regional uniformity in tartan, sufficient to identify the area of origin, is reported to have occurred. Martin Martin, in A Description of the Western Islands of Scotland, published in 1703, wrote, after describing trews and belted plaids "of divers Colours ... agreeable to the nicest Fancy", that tartans could be used to distinguish the inhabitants of different places. (Note: Martin Martin (1703) wrote: "each Isle differs from the other in their fancy of making Plaids, as to the Stripes in Breadth and Colours. This Humour is as different thro the main Land of the Highlands, in-so-far that they who have seen these Places are able, at the first view of a Man's Plaid to guess the Place of his Residence ...." Scarlett (1990) says some earlier writers used this to just assume "a fully organised system of District tartans at that time" though Martin said nothing of the sort. Scarlett considered Martin's account to have "a rather sweeping style that suggests some exaggeration", but generally plausible on other evidence of particular patterns, with minor variations, being common across wide areas.) Martin did not mention anything like the use of a special pattern by each family.

In 1709, the Independent Highland Companies were wearing everyday Highland dress, not uniforms of a particular tartan, to better blend in with civilians and detect Jacobite treachery. In 1713, the Royal Company of Archers (a royal bodyguard unit first formed in 1676), became the first unit in service to the British crown who adopted a particular tartan as a part of their formal uniform. The militiamen of Clan Grant may have been all in green-and-red tartan (details unspecified) as early as 1703–04 and wearing a uniform tartan livery by 1715. It is not a surviving pattern, and modern Grant tartans are of much later date.

An account of the Highland men in 1711 had it that they all, including "those of the better sort", wore the belted plaid. A 1723 account suggested that gentlemen, at least when commingling with the English, were more likely to wear tartan trews and hose with their attendants in the belted plaid, which Burt also observed; trews were also more practical for horseback riding. Also around 1723, short tartan jackets, called in Gaelic còta-goirid, sometimes with slashed sleeves and worn with a matching waistcoat, made their first appearance and began supplanting, in Highland dress, the plain-coloured doublets that were common throughout European dress of the era; the còta-goirid was often worn with matching trews and a shoulder plaid that might or might not match, but could also be worn with a belted plaid. (Note: These tartan jackets are not to be confused with the later short regimental Highland doublet styles, borrowed directly from the military Highland regiments starting in the late 18th century; these are also of plain colour, not tartan.)

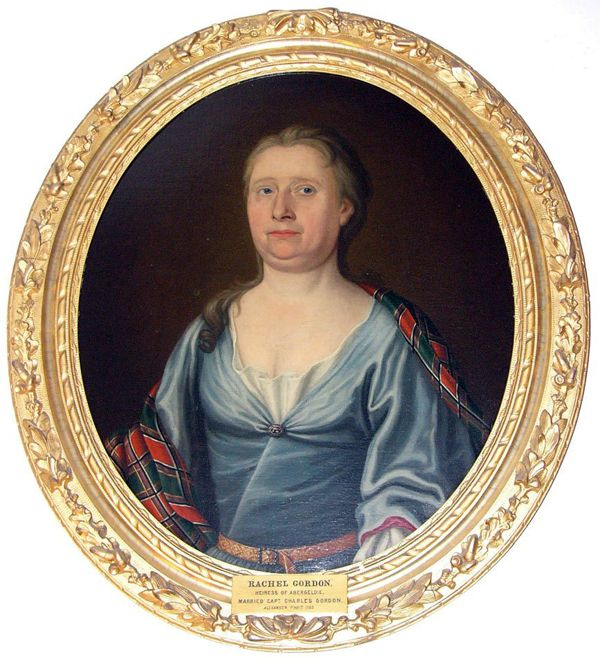
Rachel Gordon of Abergeldie, c. 1700 – the earliest known formal portrait of a woman in tartan

M. Martin (1703) wrote that the "vulgar" Hebridean women still wore the arisaid wrap/dress, describing it as "a white Plad, having a few small Stripes of black, blue, and red; it reach'd from the Neck to the Heels, and was tied before on the Breast with a Buckle of Silver, or Brass", some very ornate. He said they also wore a decorated belt, scarlet sleeves, and head kerchiefs of linen. Martin was not the only period source to suggest it was primarily the wear of the common women, with upper-class Highland ladies in the 18th century more likely to wear tailored gowns, dresses, and riding habits, often of imported material, as did Lowland and English women. Highland women's dress was also sometimes simply in linear stripes rather than tartan, a cloth called iomairt (drugget). From the late 18th century, as the arisaid was increasingly set aside for contemporary womenswear, while Highland men continued wearing the belted plaid., the ladies' plaids were reduced to smaller "screens" – fringed shawls used as headdresses and as dress accessories, "a gentrification of the arisaid". (Wilsons continued producing these in the first half of the 19th century.) John Macky in A Journey Through Scotland (1723) wrote of Scottish women wearing, when about, such tartan plaids over their heads and bodies, over English-style dress, and likened the practice to continental women wearing black wraps for church, market, and other functions. Edmund Burt, an Englishman who spent years in and around Inverness, wrote in 1727–1737 (published 1754) that the women there also wore such plaids, made of fine worsted wool or even of silk, that they were sometimes used to cover the head, and that they were worn long, to the ankle, on one side. He added that in Edinburgh (far to the southeast) they were also worn, with ladies indicating their Whig or Tory political stance by which side they wore long (though he did not remember which side was which). In Edinburgh, perennial disapproval of the "barbarous habitte" of women wearing plaids over their heads returned in 1753 writings of William Maitland. Women first appear in known painted portraits with tartan c. 1700, with that of Rachel Gordon of Abergeldie; more early examples are found in 1742 and 1749 paintings by William Mosman,. They show plaids (in tartans that do not survive as modern patterns) worn loosely around the shoulders by sitters in typical European-fashion dresses. Some entire dresses of tartan feature in mid-18th-century portraits, but they are uncommon. In the Jacobite period, tartan was sometimes also used as trim, e.g. on hats. Plaids were worn also as part of wedding outfits. The monied sometimes had entire wedding dresses of tartan, some in silk, and even devised custom tartans for weddings, typically based on existing patterns with colours changed.

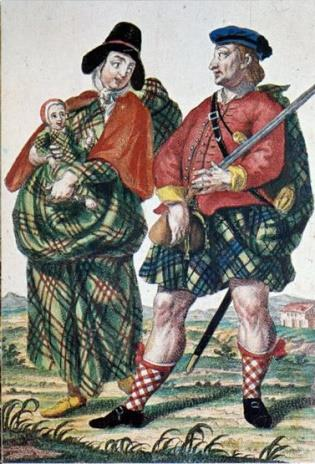
Highland soldier and family, the woman in an arisaid; by Martin Engelbrecht c. 1717–1754 (Note: Sources conflict sharply on the date. Telfer Dunbar (1979), relying on Mackay Scobie, says 1717-1739; while Eslea MacDonald (2016), relying on R. W. Munro's Highland Clans & Tartans (1977), says 1754.)

Portraits became more popular among the Highland elite starting in the early 18th century. Similar cloth to that in the c. 1683 Mungo Murray portrait appears in the 1708 portrait of the young John Campbell of Glenorchy, attributed to Charles Jervas; and the c. 1712 portrait of Kenneth Sutherland, Lord Duffus, by Richard Waitt. This style of very "busy" but brown-dominated tartan seems to have been fairly common through the early 18th century, and is quite different from later patterns. As the century wore on, bolder setts came to dominate, judging from later portraits and surviving cloth and clothing samples. By the early 18th century, tartan manufacture (and weaving in general) were centred in Bannockburn, Stirling; this is where the eventually dominant tartan weaver William Wilson & Son, founded c. 1765, were based. (Note: Banks & de La Chapelle (2007) give an implausible 1724 date for the founding of Wilsons, which does not agree with other scholarship, and they cite no source for the assertion.)

Judging from rare surviving samples, the predominant civilian tartan colours of this period, in addition to white (undyed wool) and black, were rich reds and greens and rather dark blues, not consistent from area to area; where a good black was available, dark blue was less used. The sett of a typical Highland pattern of the era as shown in portraits was red with broad bands of green and/or blue, sometimes with fine-line over-checks. (Note: Scarlett (2008): "Red, blue and green have been recorded as the first colours to appear in all primitive art, so there may be some deep physiological or psychological reason for the predominance of these colours.") Oil portraiture was the province of the privileged, and "Sunday best" tartans with red grounds were commonly worn in them as a status symbol, from the early 18th century, the dye typically being made from expensive imported cochineal. Green and blue more generally predominated owing to their relative ease of production with locally available dyes, with more difficult yellow (Note: Britain has many native plants that can produce at least a thin yellow, but they seem not to have been favoured, except as a ground-colour for over-dyeing with blue to create green.) and red dyes commonly being saved for thin over-check lines (a practice that continued, e.g. in military and consequently many clan tartans, through to the 19th century). However, even local-dyestuff blues were often over-dyed with some amount of imported indigo for a richer colour.

==== Union protest and Jacobite rebellion ====
The Treaty and Acts of Union in 1706–07, which did away with the separate Parliament of Scotland, led to Scottish Lowlanders adopting tartan in large numbers for the first time, as a symbol of protest against the union. It was worn not just by men (regardless of social class), but even influential Edinburgh ladies, well into the 1790s. By the beginning of the 18th century, there was also some demand for tartan in England, to be used for curtains, bedding, nightgowns, etc., and weavers in Norwich, Norfolk, and some other English cities were attempting to duplicate Scottish product, but were considered the lower-quality option.

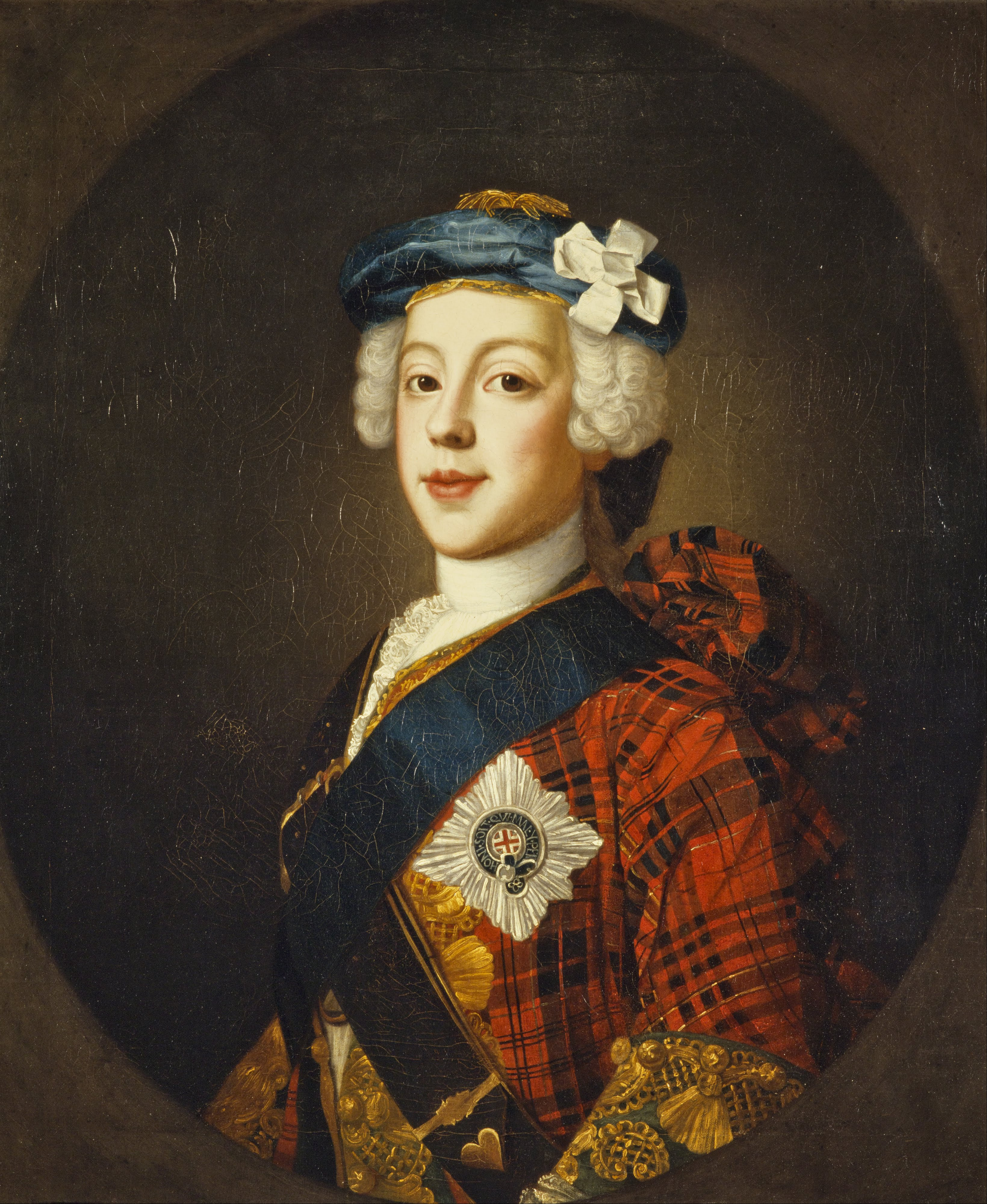
Charles Edward Stuart, "Bonnie Prince Charlie", in tartan and blue bonnet with Jacobite white cockade; portrait by William Mosman c. 1750

The most effective fighters for Jacobitism were the supporting Scottish clans, leading to an association of tartan and Highland dress with the Jacobite cause to restore the Catholic Stuart dynasty to the throne of England, Scotland, and Ireland. This included great kilts, and trews (trousers) with great coats, all typically of tartan cloth, as well as the blue bonnet. The British parliament had considered banning the belted plaid after the Jacobite rising of 1715, but did not. Highland garb came to form something of a Jacobite uniform, even worn by Prince Charles Edward Stuart ("Bonnie Prince Charlie") himself by the mid-18th century, (Note: A small piece of tartan believed to be from a plaid of Bonnie Prince Charlie, given in 1746 to Lady Anne Mackintosh of Clan Farquharson, survives in the National Records of Scotland. The prince apparently had a habit of giving out plaids as thanks for hospitality, and several recorded (but quite different) tartans are said to have come from these plaids, e.g. SRT 4220, 4421, 4422, and 4423. According to Telfer Dunbar (1979), various museums and other collections hold at least 40 pieces of tartan claimed to have been worn by "the Young Pretender", eight at the Battle of Culloden, and they cannot all be genuine. One sample in particular is more likely than the others to be legitimate.) mostly in propaganda portraits (with inconsistent tartans) but also by eyewitness account at Culloden. By this period, sometimes a belted plaid was worn over tartan trews and jacket (in patterns that need not match).

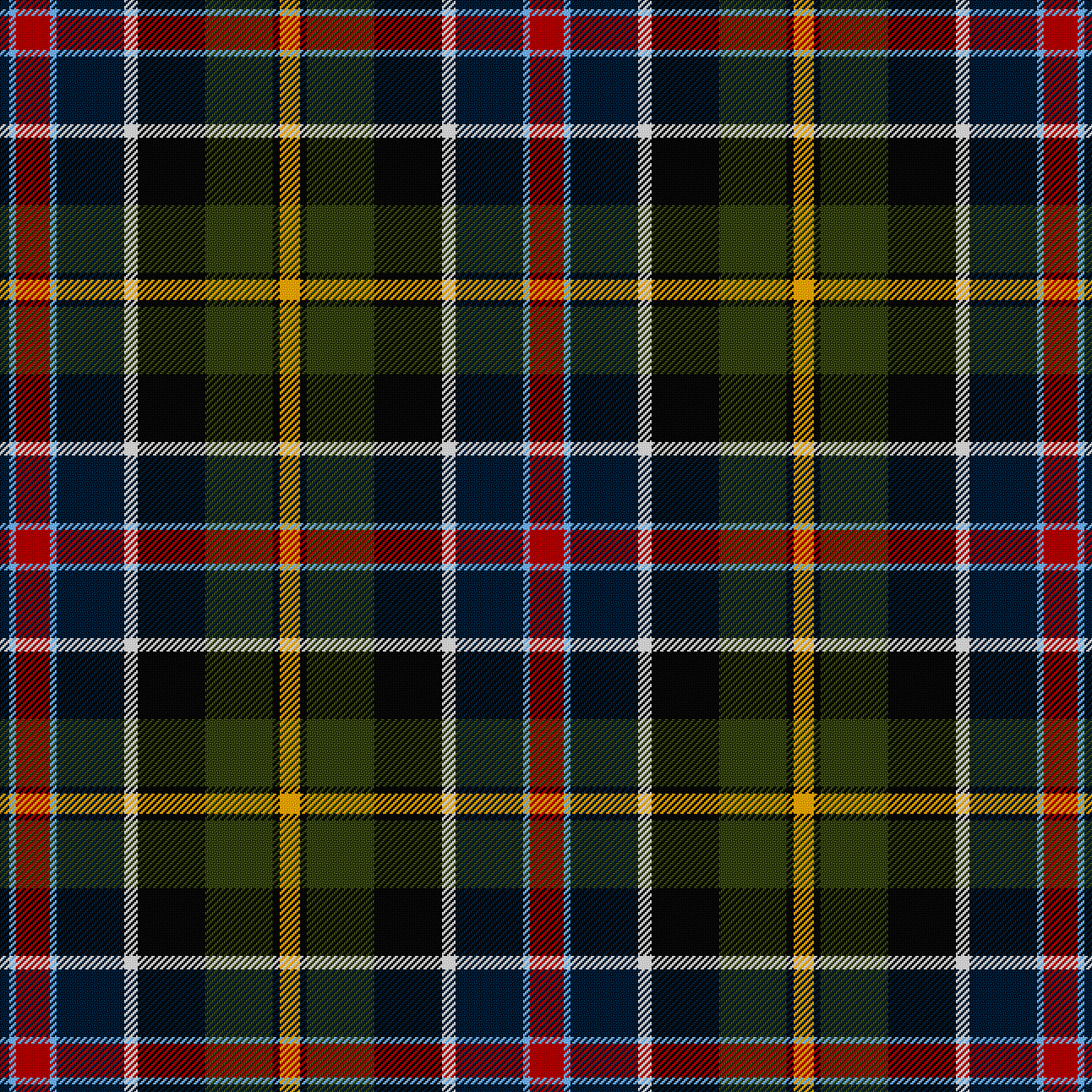
A pattern from a coat (probably Jacobite) known to date to the period of the 1745 uprising

Burt had concurred c. 1728, as did his 1818 editor Robert Jamieson, with Buchanan's much earlier 1582 observation that tartans were often in colours intended to blend into heather and other natural surroundings. This may just represent prejudices of English writers of the period, however, at least by the mid-18th century. Extant samples of Culloden-era cloth are sometimes quite colourful. One example is a pattern found on a coat (probably Jacobite) known to date to around the 1745 uprising; while it has faded to olive and navy tones, the sett is a bold one of green, blue, black, red, yellow, white, and light blue (in diminishing proportions). While an approximation of the pattern was first published in D. W. Stewart (1893), the colours and proportions were wrong; the original coat was rediscovered and re-examined in 2007. Another surviving Culloden sample, predominantly red with broad bands of blue, green, and black, and some thin over-check lines, consists of a largely intact entire plaid that belonged on one John Moir; it was donated to the National Museum of Scotland in 2019.

There is a legend that a particular still-extant tartan was used by the Jacobites as an identifier even prior to "the '15". This story can be traced to W. & A. Smith (1850) in Authenticated Tartans of the Clans and Families of Scotland, in which they claimed that a pattern they published was received from an unnamed woman then still living who in turn claimed a family tradition that the tartan dated to 1712, long before her birth, but for which there is no evidence. This hearsay tale was later repeated as if known fact by other books, e.g., Adam Frank's What Is My Tartan? in 1896, and Margaret MacDougall's 1974 revision of Robert Bain's 1938 Clans and Tartans of Scotland. (Note: There are several other tartans called "Jacobite". One dates to c. 1850, or might be a bit older and is probably a Wilsons design, and the others are more recent commercial inventions of c. 1930 and the late 20th century.) Even the often credulous Innes of Learney (1938) did not believe it. The pattern in question does date to at least c. 1815–26, because it was collected by the Highland Society of London during that span. But there is no substantiated evidence of Jacobites using a consistent tartan, much less one surviving to the present.

Independent Highland Companies were re-raised from Scottish clans loyal to the Hanoverian monarchy during 1725–29. (Note: Telfer Dunbar (1979) says the correct year is 1725 and that 1729 was an error introduced by Stewart of Garth (1822) and copied by later authors.) This time they wore uniform tartans of blue, black, and green, presumably with differencing over-check lines. They were all normalised to one tartan during 1725–33 (a pattern which probably does not survive to the present day). The uniform tartan appears to have changed into a new tartan, known today as Black Watch or Government, when the companies amalgamated to become the 42nd (Black Watch) regiment in 1739.

==== Proscription and its aftermath ====
After the failure of the Jacobite rising of 1745, efforts to pacify the Highlands and weaken the cultural and political power of the clans led to the Dress Act 1746, part of the Act of Proscription to disarm the Highlanders. Because tartan Highland dress was so strongly symbolically linked to the militant Jacobite cause, the act – a highly political throwback to the long-abandoned sumptuary laws – banned the wearing of Highland dress by men and boys in Scotland north of the River Forth (i.e. in the Highlands), (Note: Specifically, as defined in an earlier act of Parliament, north of the "Highland line" running from Perth in the east to Dumbarton in the west.) except for the landed gentry (Note: The Dress Act per se did not enumerate exceptions for the nobility, but the enclosing Act of Proscription did.) and the Highland regiments of the British Army. The law was based on 16th century bans against the wearing of traditional Irish clothing in the Kingdom of Ireland by the Dublin Castle administration. Sir Walter Scott wrote of the Dress Act: "There was knowledge of mankind in the prohibition, since it divested the Highlanders of a dress which was closely in association with their habits of Clanship and of war."

Tartans recorded shortly after the act (thus probably being patterns in use in the period before proscription) show that a general pattern was used in a wide area, with minor changes being made by individual weavers to taste. E.g., the tartan today used as the main (red) Mackintosh clan tartan, recorded by the Highland Society of London around 1815, was found in variants from Perthshire and Badenoch along the Great Glen to Loch Moy. Other such groups can be found, e.g. a Huntly-centred Murray/Sutherland/Gordon cluster analysed as clearly related by Innes of Learney (1938) – distinguished from a different Huntly/MacRae/Ross/Grant group identified by Scottish Register of Tartans and tartan researcher Peter Eslea MacDonald of Scottish Tartans Authority. But Scarlett (1990) says that "the old patterns available are too few in number to permit a detailed study of such pattern distributions" throughout the Highlands. Portraits of the era also show that tartan was increasingly made with identical or near-identical warp and weft patterns, which had not always been the case earlier, and that the tartan cloth used was of the fine twill, with even-warp-and-weft thickness, still used today for kilts.

Although the Dress Act, contrary to popular later belief, did not ban all tartan (or bagpipes, or Gaelic), and women, noblemen, and soldiers continued to wear tartan, it nevertheless effectively severed the everyday tradition of Highlanders wearing primarily tartan, as it imposed the wearing of non-Highland clothing common in the rest of Europe for two generations. (While some Highlanders defied the act, there were stiff criminal penalties.) It had a demoralising effect, (Note: Lt.-Col. Sir John MacGregor Murray, newly chief of Clan Gregor and later vice-president of the Highland Society of London, wrote of the difficulty of raising a new regiment, in 1803: "It will require much to rekindle the martial spirit of our ancestors, which has, unfortunately, been systematically broken down – we were so long degraded by the privation of our arms and dress, and so much unmanned by being converted into manufacturers".) and the goal of this and related measures to integrate the Highlanders into Lowland and broader British society was largely successful. By the 1770s, Highland dress seemed all but extinct. However, the act may also ironically have helped to "galvanize clan consciousness" under that suppression; Scottish clans, in romanticised form, were to come roaring back in the "clan tartans" run of the Regency (late Georgian) to Victorian period.

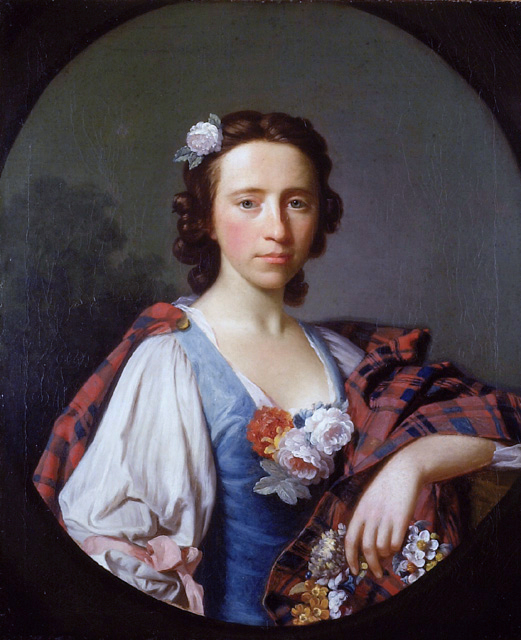
Jacobite women continued wearing tartan during the proscription (1749 portrait of Flora MacDonald by Allan Ramsay and Joseph van Aken; the tartan is a Tullibardine area pattern, later the Murray of Tullibardine clan tartan).

In the interim, Jacobite women continued using tartan profusely, for clothing (from dresses to shoes), curtains, and everyday items. While Classicism-infused portraiture of 18th-century clan nobles (often painted outside Scotland) typically showed them in tartan and "Highland" dress, much of it was loyalist regimental military stylings, the antithesis of Jacobite messaging; it foreshadowed a major shift in the politics of tartan. Nevertheless, this profuse application of tartan could be seen as rebellious to some extent, with the reified Highlander becoming "a heroic and classical figure, the legatee of primitive virtues." And by the 1760s, tartan had become increasingly associated with Scotland in general, not just the Highlands, especially in the English mind.

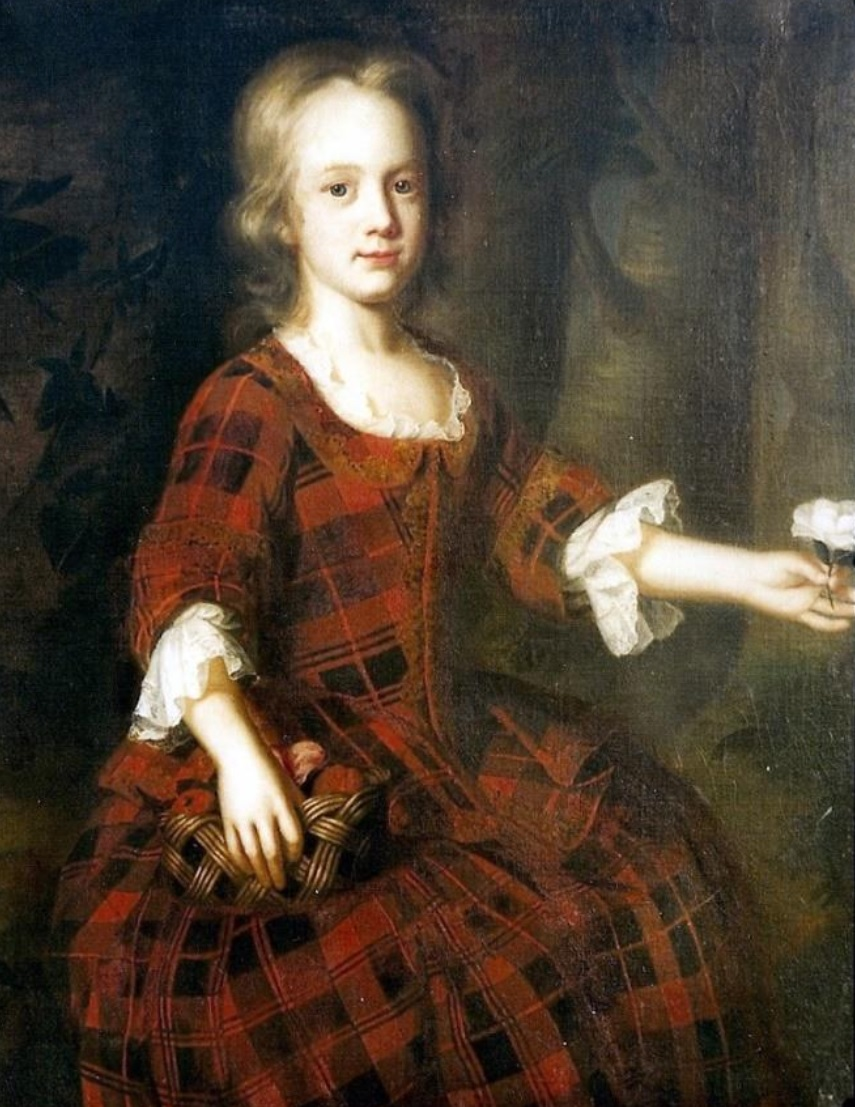
Helen Murray of Ochtertyre, daughter and eldest child of Sir Patrick Murray of Ochtertyre, 4th Bt; c. 1750, artist uncertain. The tartans of the bodice and skirt do not match exactly, and are not surviving patterns.

After much outcry (as the ban applied to Jacobites and loyalists alike), the Dress Act was repealed in 1782, primarily through efforts of the Highland Society of London; the repeal bill was introduced by James Graham, Marquis of Graham (later Duke of Montrose). Some Highlanders resumed their traditional dress, but overall it had been abandoned by its former peasant wearers, taken up instead by the upper and middle classes, as a fashion. Tartan had been "culturally relocated as a picturesque ensemble or as the clothing of a hardy and effective fighting force" for the crown, not a symbol of direct rebellion. R. Martin (1988) calls this transmutation "the great bifurcation in tartan dress", the cloth being largely (forcibly) abandoned by the original Highland provincials then taken up by the military and consequently by non-Highlander civilians. During the prohibition, traditional Highland techniques of wool spinning and dyeing, and the weaving of tartan, had sharply declined. Commercial production of tartan was to become re-centred in the Lowlands, in factory villages along the fringe of the Highlands, among companies like Wilsons of Bannockburn (then the dominant manufacturer), with the rise of demand for tartan for military regimental dress. Some tartan weaving continued in the Highlands, and would even see a boost in the late Georgian period. Tartan by this era had also become popular in Lowland areas including Fife and Lothian and the urban centres of Edinburgh and Stirling. From 1797 to 1830, Wilsons were exporting large quantities of tartan (for both men's and women's clothing), first to the British colonies in Grenada and Jamaica (where the affordable, durable, and bright material was popular for clothing enslaved people), and had clients in England, Northern and Central Europe, and a bit later in North and South America and the Mediterranean. However, by the end of the 18th century, Wilsons had "stiff competition" (in civilian tartan) from English weavers in Norwich.

Because the Dress Act had not applied to the military or gentry, tartan gradually had become associated with the affluent, rather than "noble savage" Highlanders, from the late 18th century and into the 19th, along with patriotic military-influenced clothing styles in general; tartan and militarised Highland dress were being revived among the fashion-conscious across Britain, even among women with military relatives. The clans, Jacobitism, and anti-unionism (none of them any longer an actual threat of civil unrest) were increasingly viewed with a sense of nostalgia, especially after the death of Prince Charles Edward Stuart in 1788, even as Highland regiments proved their loyalty and worth. Adopting the airs of a Tory sort of tartaned "Highlandism" provided a post-union and resigned sense of national (and militarily elite) distinction from the rest of Britain, without threatening empire. Even the future George IV donned Highland regalia for a masquerade ball in 1789. By the 1790s, some of the gentry were helping design tartans for their own personal use, according to surviving records from Wilsons. Jane (Maxwell) Gordon, Duchess of Gordon, was said to have "introduced tartan to [royal] court ... wearing a plaid of the Black Watch, to which her son had just been appointed", in 1792; she triggered a fashion of wearing tartan in London and Paris, though was not immune to caricature by the disapproving.

R. Martin (1988) wrote, from a historiographical perspective, that after the Dress Act:

the idea of Highland dress was stored in the collective historical attic; when it was revived in the years leading up to 1822, it had been forgotten by some two or three generations in civilian dress and could be remembered, however deceptively, however naively, to have been the ancient dress of the Highlands, not that so recently worn as the standard peasant dress before 1746. The ban on tartan was hugely successful, but so inimical to a natural historical process, that it promoted the violent re-assertion of the tartan, sanctioned by a spurious sense of history, in the next century.

The tumultuous events of 18th-century Scotland led to not just broader public use of tartan cloth, but two particular enduring tartan categories: regimental tartans and eventually clan tartans.

== Regimental tartans ==
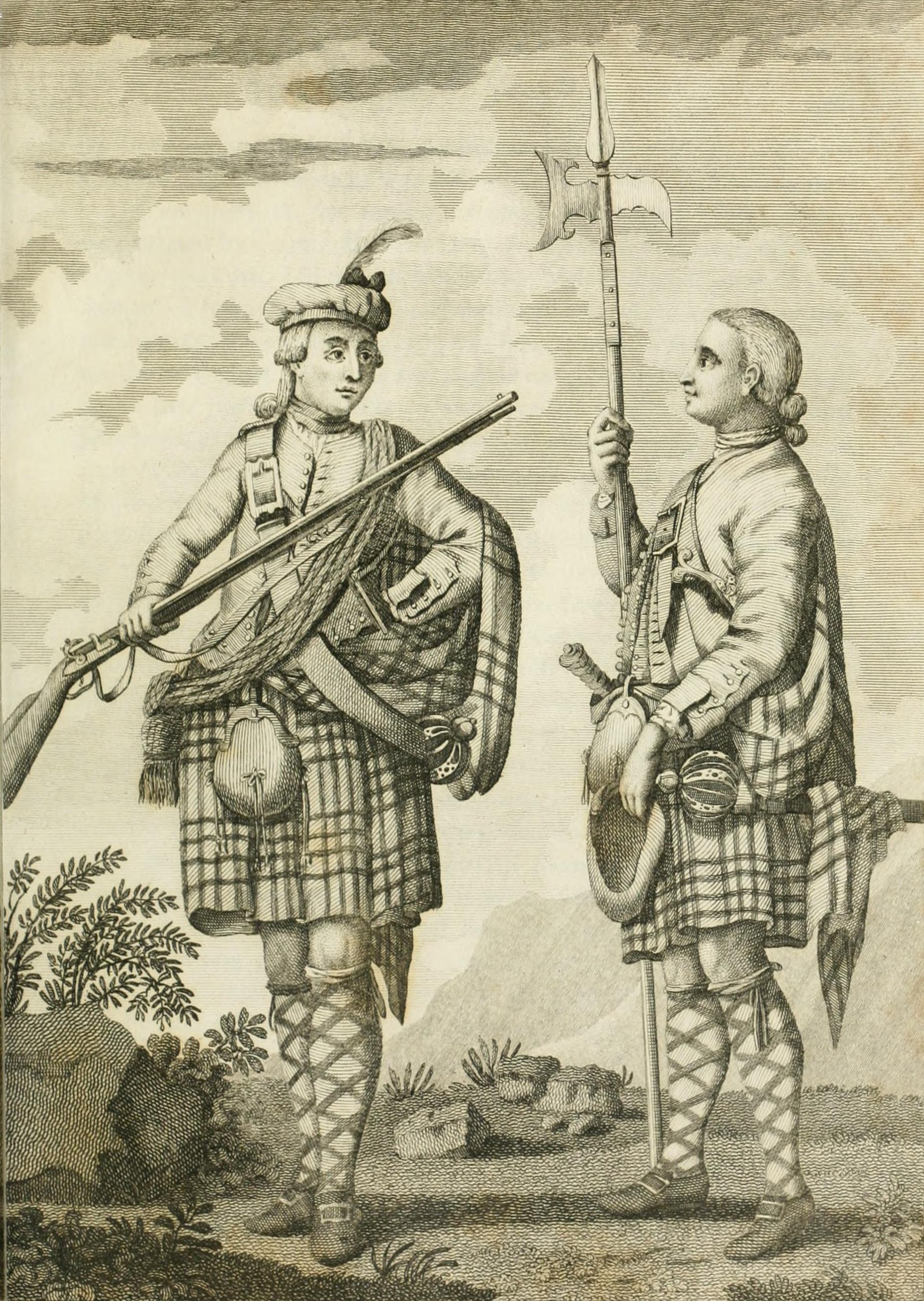
Soldiers from a Highland regiment c. 1744 wearing tartan belted plaids (great kilts).

After the period of the early clan militias and the Independent Highland Companies (IHCs), over 100 battalions of line, fencible, militia, and volunteer regiments were raised, between c. 1739 and the end of the Napoleonic Wars in 1815, in or predominantly in the Highlands, a substantial proportion of them in Highland dress. Of these units, only some had distinct uniform tartans, and of those, only a small number were recorded to the present day.

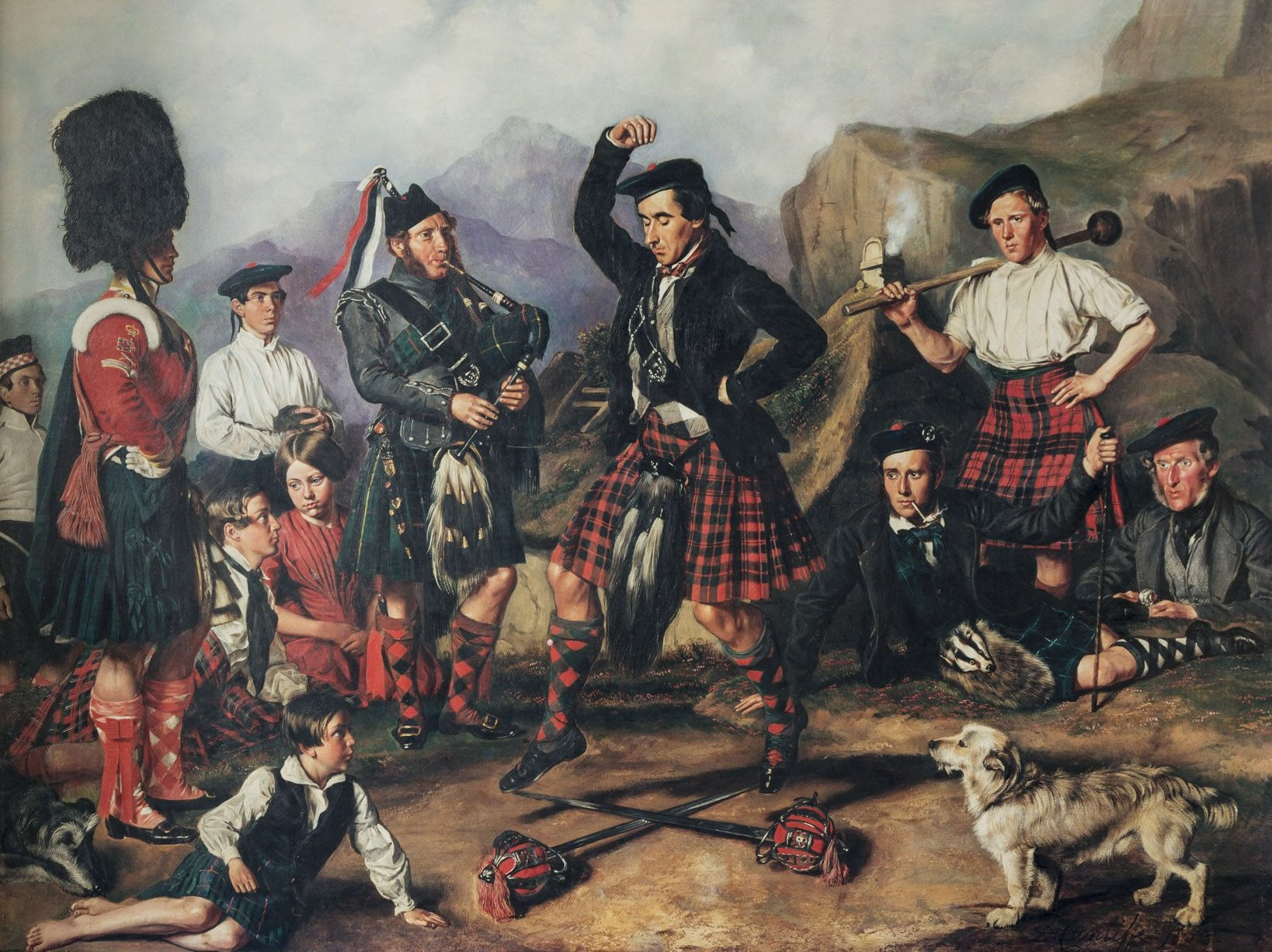
The Sword Dance by David Cunliffe, 1853, depicting men of the 42nd and 93rd. The dancer in the centre wears the 42nd's red band tartan.

The IHCs were amalgamated in 1739 to become the 43rd (later 42nd) Regiment of Foot, called the Black Watch. It was the first proper governmental Highland regiment, part of the British Army, and they wore the belted plaid ("great kilt") for dress, and the tailored small kilt for undress uniform. For the former garment, they used a distinctive tartan, which was designed for the unit. It was originally called the "42nd tartan", so it probably was not adopted until after the unit was renumbered the 42nd in 1749. It seems likely that the tartan was based on those used by the IHCs earlier, but with double black "tram line" over-checks added. The Black Watch pattern was used by various other regiments, and it has been estimated that to clothe them all, some 30–40 miles (48–64 km) of the tartan had to be woven before 1750 alone. It became the basis of various later regimental (and eventually clan) tartans. It remains popular in general-public use under the names "Black Watch", "Government", and any of "old Campbell", "hunting Grant", or "hunting Munro", but today officially called "Government No. 1" by the military. The 42nd had separate tartans for its small kilt until c. 1814 (also used for grenadiers' belted plaids), for pipers, and for drummers.

After the Jacobite uprisings, raising a regiment in service to the king was, for many Scottish lairds, a way of rehabilitating the family name, assuring new-found loyalty to the Hanoverian crown, and currying royal favour (even regaining forfeited estates). Exempt from the Dress Act, men in these Highland regiments of the empire were given Highland dress, and the "kilts and pipes that were once considered barbaric were now seen as 'safe' nationalism" within the army. From c. 1770 onward into the 19th century, virtually all the regimental tartan was produced by the company William Wilson & Son of Bannockburn, the dominant tartan weaver. Regimental uniforms, including tartans, were left – usually within the general Black Watch-based colour scheme of black, blue, and green – to their commanders.

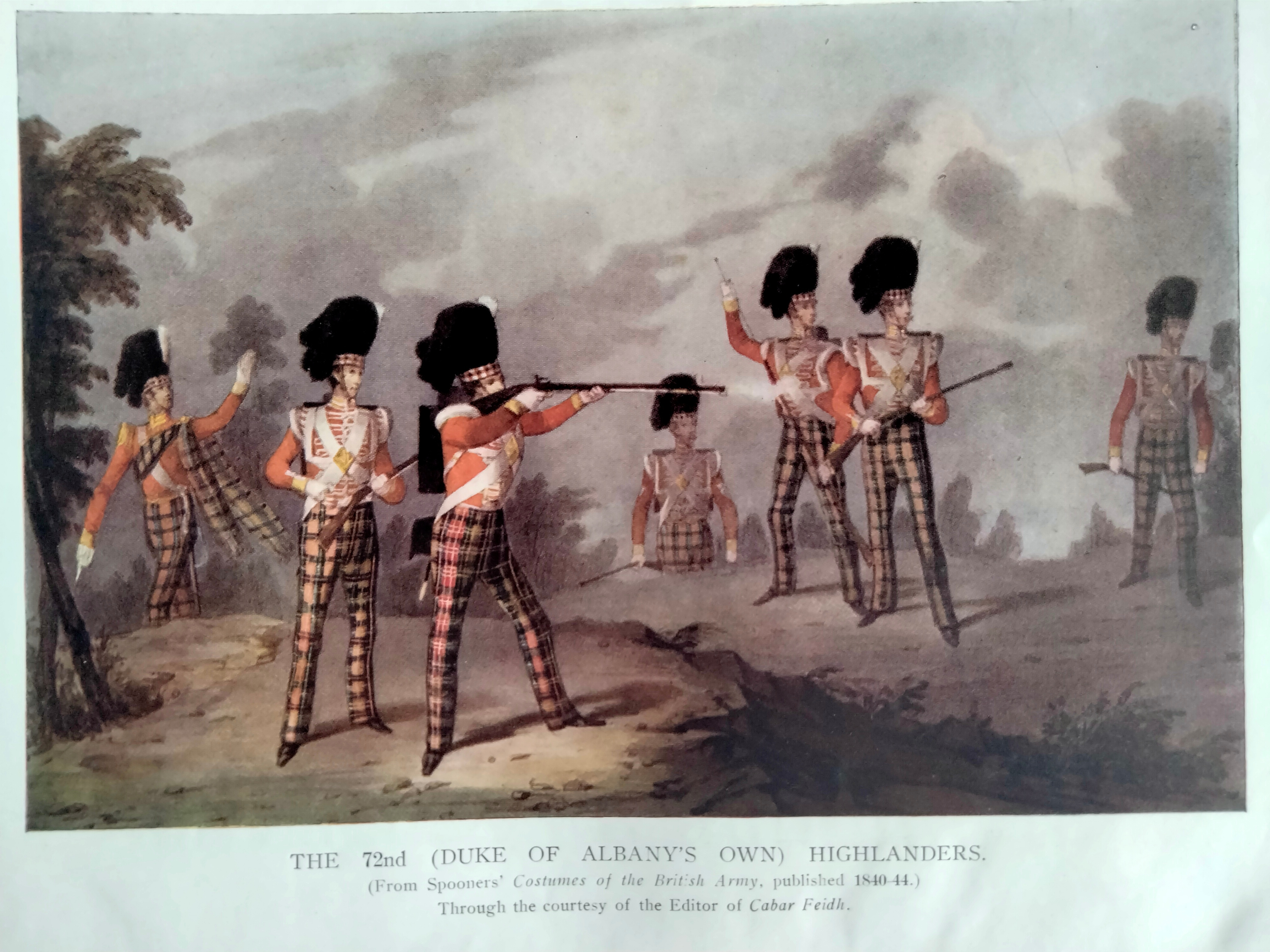
72nd Duke of Albany's Own Highlanders during a trews-wearing period, c. 1844, in the tartan named for Prince Charles Edward Stuart

Some surviving early regimental tartans include:

- Loudoun's Highlanders (64th, raised in 1745), used a tartan similar to Black Watch, but with over-checks of red and yellow, and lacking the two black "tram lines" of Black Watch.
- The 78th (Highlanders) or Ross-shire Buffs (raised 1793), MacLeod's Highlanders (73rd, later 71st, raised 1777–78), and the original Seaforth Highland Regiment (78th, later 72nd, raised 1778) (Note: Not to be confused with the second Seaforth's Highlanders, also raised as the 78th, in 1793. The original Seaforth's Highlanders were amalgamated with other units under the Childers Reforms to become the 1881 Seaforth Highlanders.) first used Black Watch, then in 1787 adopted a variant of it with thin over-checks of red and white. It eventually became the Clan Mackenzie tartan, and it remains used as an official British military tartan, designated "Government No. 5A". A slight variation, with yellow in place of white, became one of the Clan MacLeod tartans.
- The 74th (Highland) Regiment of Foot (raised 1787) (Note: Not to be confused with the earlier 74th Regiment of (Highland) Foot, raised 1777.) used another variant of the Black Watch tartan with a black-guarded white over-check. Also in 1787, the 75th (Highland) Regiment, later 75th (Stirlingshire), probably used a more distinct tartan, not based on Black Watch, of purple and black on a green ground, with thin white and black over-checks; it was later called "No. 64 or Abercromby" by Wilsons, and though it did not become adopted as an Abercromby/Abercrombie clan tartan, variants of it became two unrelated clan patterns.
- The Gordon Highlanders (100th, later 92nd, raised 1794) also wore an altered Black Watch, this time with a thin yellow over-check. In a rare show of competition to Wilsons, the pattern was designed in 1793 and supplied by weaver William Forsyth of Huntly, Aberdeen. This pattern became the main tartan of Clan Gordon. Something nearly identical (perhaps with the yellow over-check in a different width) was also used by the 8th (Rothesay and Caithness) Fencibles.
- The Cameronian Volunteers (79th, later Queen's Own Cameron Highlanders, raised 1793) used a comparatively distinct tartan, later the family tartan of the Cameron of Erracht branch of Clan Cameron. It is structurally much like Black Watch, but without black over-checks and with a number of yellow and red over-checks. It has been said to have been designed by the unit leaderor a family member.
- The Fraser Fencibles (raised 1794–95) used a tartan with a red ground and green and blue bands, unrelated to the Black Watch style.
- The Sutherland Highlanders (93rd) raised 1799, and later the Argyll and Sutherland Highlanders (Princess Louise's, formed 1881 by amalgamation of the 93rd with the 91st Argyllshire Highlanders), may have worn a lightened version of Black Watch, now sometimes used as one of the Clan Sutherland tartans; it is also still militarily used as sett "Government No. 1A".
- The Loyal Clan Donnachie Volunteers (raised in 1803) had its own uniform tartan, which was later adopted as the hunting Robertson/Donnachie/Duncan clan tartan.
- The Duke of Albany's Own Highlanders (formerly Seaforth's 72nd), during a trews-wearing period of 1823–1881, wore a tartan called Prince Charles Edward Stuart, similar to royal Stewart, as shown in a period painting. Identified in surviving cloth samples from the mid-18th century (before the regiment) it is one of the oldest setts in continuous production.

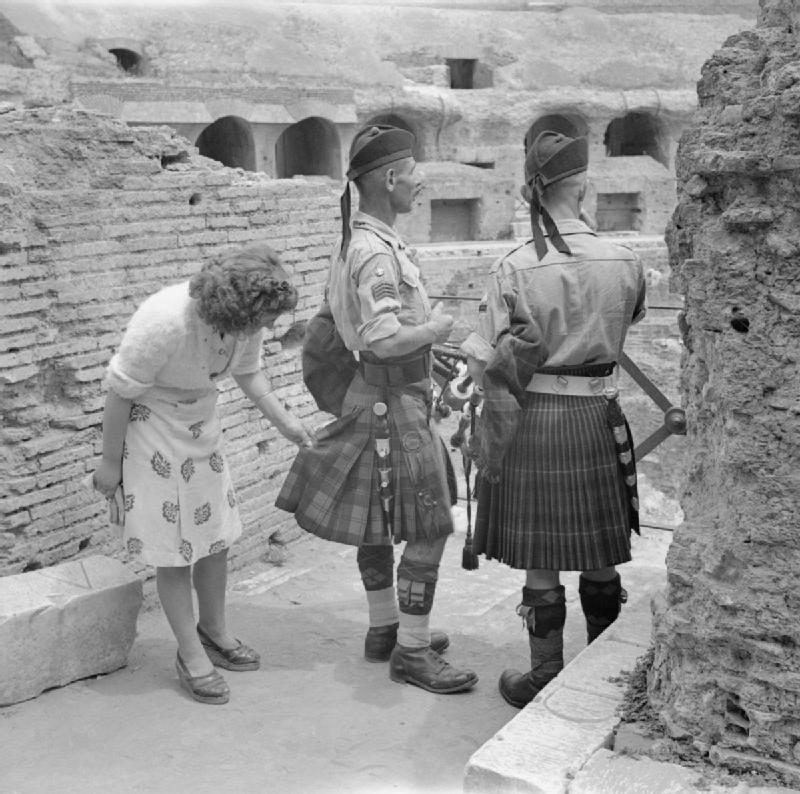
An Italian woman inspects the kilts of two pipe majors in Rome, 1944, toward the end of kilts as undress uniform in Highland regiments

By the turn of the 18th and 19th centuries, women in Scotland were especially "desirous to dress in the uniform plaids of their husbands", in particularly fine-quality cloth, according to records of Wilsons of Bannockburn. After the Highland regiments proved themselves fearless and effective in various military campaigns, the glory associated with them did much to keep alive, initially among the gentry and later the general public, an interest in tartan and kilts, which might have otherwise slipped into obscurity due to the Dress Act's prohibition. The belted plaid was abandoned in favour of the small kilt, around 1814. After the "clan tartanry" rush of the early to mid-19th century, various later Highland regiments adopted some of the recently minted clan tartans for their uniforms (reversing the original regimental-into-clan-tartan flow). Some of these adoptions remain in regimental use today.

The Lowland regiments (dating in some form to 1633 and never before dressed in Highland garb but in a variant of regular army uniform) were outfitted in tartan trews in 1881. This both linked them with and distinguished them from the tartan-kilted Highland regiments. Typically the "Government" (Black Watch) tartan was used, though some units later diversified. Several Highland regiments were again assigned new tartans that were clan tartans rather than unit-specific ones, into the early 20th century.

Today, about a dozen tartans are officially used (and half a dozen more unofficially) between all of the surviving historical Scottish regiments, which have largely been amalgamated since 2006 as battalions into the Royal Regiment of Scotland, part of the Scottish, Welsh and Irish Division. These tartans are only worn in dress and pipe-band uniforms, after the practical uniform changes introduced in the early part of World War II, which did away with tartan kilts and trews in undress uniforms. Some military units in other countries also have their own tartans. In all, there are at least 38 documented tartans that have at one time or another been associated with regiments, though many of them also with clans. (Note: The commercial tartan weaver D. C. Dalgliesh provides a list of those that they supply, and it includes a mix of obscure tartans from defunct regiments, ones still used today for surviving regiments, tartans of overseas units that were "Highland" only in name, some that are now only associated with clans, and a number that are/were reserved for military pipe-band use and were not used in regular dress or undress uniforms.)

== Clan tartans ==
With an exception dating to 1618 and another to c. 1703–1715 (neither of which appear to have survived), it is generally regarded that tartans associated by name with Scottish clans mostly date to the early-to-mid 19th century, some few to the late 18th at the earliest, depending on how one defines "clan tartan". The belief that the clan tartans are an "ancient" system of symbolic family differentiation is pervasive, even passionate, but lacks substantive evidence even as it is overwhelmed by counter-evidence. It is what J. C. Thompson (1992) called "the Great Tartan Myth", and James D. Scarlett (1990) "the Tartan Cult". Lt.-Col. M. M. Haldane (1931) called it an assumption, which "has acquired such a formidable weight from mere reiteration" without "critical examination of evidence". Barnes & Allen (1956) observed:

There is no doubt that many 'setts' had been traditional to certain districts for centuries, but the theory that they were a sort of Clan uniform seems now to have been quite discredited.

Responding to the claim that clan tartans have "an ancient political significance", Richard Martin, curator of the Fashion Institute of Technology museum and later the Costume Institute at the Metropolitan Museum of Art, wrote (1988): "[This] assertion about history is wrong and can be demonstrated to be perniciously wrong". According to National Galleries of Scotland curator A. E. Haswell Miller (1956):

To sum up, the presumed heraldic or "family badge" significance of the tartan has no documentary support, and the establishment of the myth can be accounted for by a happy coincidence of the desire of the potential customers, the manufacturer and the salesman. Although the antiquity of the "clan tartans" is exaggerated, what might be termed their unofficial registration took place during the nineteenth century, and if we are prepared to accept some hundred and fifty years as sufficient to create "tradition", it may be excusable to accept the fait accompli as a pleasant – and perhaps not entirely useless – national vanity.

Highland-dress researcher and curator John Telfer Dunbar added:

The desire to give to relics of all kinds greater antiquity than they truly possess is manifold. It is a pity that tradition should be degraded in this way and the acceptance of such claims by later students has been a constant obstacle to research. The more difficult task of searching back to original sources has often been avoided in favour of easy acceptance.

Just that sort of research was performed by Peter Eslea MacDonald of the Scottish Tartans Authority, who – using every available surviving company record and sample – reconstructed and traced the history of tartan patterns from the leading weaver of the late Georgian through Edwardian eras, a company instrumental in the actual design, spread, and acceptance of clan tartans. His conclusion:

Today, books and shops dealing with Highland dress will be mainly, if not exclusively, concerned with clan tartans. They may seek to suggest that these are the actual patterns worn by the Scottish clans throughout history, up to and including the Battle of Culloden in 1746. This is not the case. The majority of the pre-1850 patterns bearing clan names can only be traced back to the early 19th century and to the famous weaving firm of William Wilson & Son of Bannockburn, near Stirling.

The notion of clan tartans has been called "an astonishingly successful marketing story" and an example of an invented tradition, though one that became very well-accepted by the clans to whom it pertained and by the weaving industry starting in 1815, as well as by the general public from around 1822 – "adopted enthusiastically by both wearer and seller alike".

Precursors of clan tartans were regionally distinctive tartans (since at least the early 18th century, perhaps even the 16th), regimental uniform tartans (from 1725 onward), and personal tartans of nobles (dating to perhaps the mid-18th century if not earlier).

Today, clan tartans are an important aspect of Scottish clans, and every clan has at least one tartan attributed to its name (some officially, some not, and in a few cases one tartan is shared between multiple clans). Clan tartans may not have actually been traditional, but they became conventional.

=== Long-running debate ===
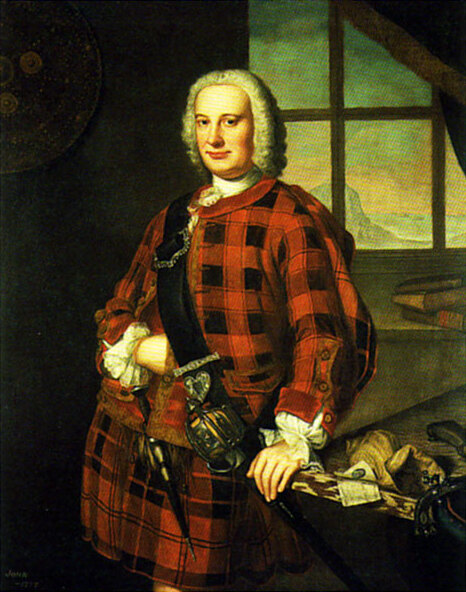
John Campbell of the Bank, 1749, by William Mosman. The present official Clan Campbell tartans are predominantly blue, green and black.

Various writers on tartans have supported or opposed the idea of clans long using distinctive tartans as an identifying badge, interpreting the scarce evidence as suited their viewpoint. (Note: As one example, in The Lockhart Papers, first published in 1714, is a passage describing how opposing battatlions of MacDonalds from different places could only tell each other apart by colour of bonnet cockade. D. W. Stewart (1893) leapt to the conclusion they must have worn the same tartan, despite the material saying nothing of the sort (they could have been wearing whatever tartans they happened to have, not uniforms, making tartan meaningless for distinguishing units of men).) Where one saw a militia uniform, or an individual noble's plaid, another saw a clan identifier. The 19th-century Celtic scholar John Francis Campbell of Islay was certain that while tartans in general were quite old, "uniform clan tartans are no older than clan regiments", a view backed by Haldane (1931) in a series of articles in The Scots Magazine, followed by many tartan writers later.

The earliest evidence summarised below could have been more a matter of militia uniform than clan-wide dress; a distinction in that era is difficult to be certain of today, because troops then were led by landed gentry and a unit was raised largely on its commander's land from his clansmen. (Note: D. W. Stewart (1893) sometimes leaned toward the uniform interpretation: "It appears from the regulations issued to the retainers of the Clan Grant anent the wearing of a uniform tartan that distinctive patterns were in use, at least for military purpose, or on occasion of great gatherings". The Grant case is covered in detail later.) Such definitional uncertainty could also apply to the 1691 Grameid poem; describing what appear to be some soldierly uniform tartans, (Note: D. W. Stewart (1893) again came down on the "uniform" side, despite otherwise being a booster of the idea of early clan tartans; so did Scarlett (1990).) it could be reinterpreted as supporting an early notion of clan tartans, if one wanted to define that as 'what most of the men of a clan were wearing into battle'; Scarlett (1990) confirms that there has been "fiery argument" in favour of a clan tartans interpretation. However, Robert Jamieson (1818) reported that the "field dress" plaids of Highland men, for war and hunting, were different from their everyday dress – made of coarser material and using patterns intended to blend into natural surroundings, the cath dath or cath da' ('war colour'). (Note: Adam (1908/1970) confirmed that there were two different grades of tartan worn, as did Logan (1831), but both are sources of dubious quality. Scarlett (1990, 2008) also observes that there were once at least two kinds of tartan weave, a coarse, dense sort in which the weft threads were thicker than the warp, and a finer equal-twill weave, seen often in portraits, that is more like the kilt cloth produced today. (But he does not describe one as being specially intended for war.) Such a fineness split seems to have continued for a long time; Wilsons of Bannockburn manufactured regimental tartan in both coarse ("hard tartan") and fine qualities as late as 1819, perhaps as an undress and dress distinction, or enlisted and officer.) This casts some doubt on interpretation of militia tartans as general clan tartans. Most of the later regimental uniform tartans (which did not become adopted as clan tartans until around the early 19th century or the late 18th in a few cases, when they did at all) were variations on the dark, green-based Black Watch tartan, as detailed above.

J. C. Thompson (1992) noted "a typical Victorian inclination to cite previous authors with little or no attempt to evaluate their statements .... Modern analysis cannot afford to be so uncritical." Scarlett (1990) relatedly observed:

Wishful proofs are found in profusion in the literature of tartan, early and late, and consist of stating an opinion as a fact and adding some more or less relevant historical reference in support, either implying or stating that this proves the point. That it proves nothing at all is neither here nor there, so long as the manner of the presentation is sufficiently authoritative; given this treatment the wildest theory will be accepted, copied from one book to the next and so enter tartan lore. It is almost axiomatic that the wilder the theory the more acceptable it will be ....

Even D. W. Stewart (1893), who had sometimes been sympathetic toward the idea of clan tartans existing before the 19th century, wrote:

Some ... assure us that the antiquity of the so-called clan patterns is very great, and many writers allege in general terms that these designs were used as a clan distinction from the earliest period. ... The halo of romance surrounding the Jacobite struggle inclined many, and still induces others, to accept as authentic and reliable, statements which in different circumstances would be more closely sifted. Thus it is that the tartans ... have won much favour, and those who find one represented as bearing their name accept it as their ancient clan pattern without the inconvenience of investigation, or of posing any awkward questions.

The Victorians also engaged in some imaginative invention. Aside from the outright forgery of the "Sobieski Stuarts", another extreme case is Charles Rogers, who in his Social Life in Scotland (1884–86) fantastically claimed that the ancient Picts' figural designs – which were painted or tattooed on their bodies, and they went into battle nude – must have been "denoting the families or septs to which they belonged" and thus "This practice originated the tartan of Celtic clans." Another asserted that tartan was invented around a thousand years ago by Saint Margaret of Scotland.

Aside from the unreliability of early writers (and later copiers of them), part of the confusion and debate about clan tartans comes down to definitions. Sir Thomas Innes of Learney, writing in 1938 and described as "immensely keen on [tartan] codification and the importance of it", was one of the firmest proponents of the idea of very old clan tartans (in the particular sense of 'patterns consistently used for a period by certain clans', not 'patterns named for certain clans and claimed by them to the present'). (Note: Innes of Learney's motte-and-bailey tactic when it comes to what "clan tartan" means is exemplified by his supposition that similar tartans used in lands of Murray, Murray of Athol, and Sutherland must mean they went back to a common tribal tartan "from the twelfth century" (which is not attested), and that: "It was no doubt 'the Murrays' tartan' without being 'The Murray tartan'".) He held that some setts gradually became associated with particular families (clans and septs thereof) over time; clan territories had mostly become stable by the 16th century. D. W. Stewart's 1893 reference shows various cases of old district tartans later sometimes being identified for a time with specific families before 19th-century adoption of their own (usually different) clan tartans. (Note: E.g., the district tartan of Huntly was sometimes called Brodie, sometimes associated instead with Forbes or Gordon, while Forbes did not have a distinct clan tartan until the key date of 1822, nor Brodie until the beginning of the 19th century. The several tartans named Gordon all date to 1798 or later (and that earliest one was adopted from a 1793 regimental tartan).) Innes of Learney wrote of clan tartans that (notwithstanding the unusual 1618 case covered below) "the tendency was rather to insist upon a similarity of general hue than on similarity of detail", a vague sense that is not what "clan tartan" usually refers to. He also reasoned that "it was not until about the 18th century that the clan tartans became conscious and acknowledged badges of identification". However, the surviving period source material lacks this "acknowledgement" and does not actually suggest broad adoption of formal clan tartans (with clan names, particularity of detail, and a symbolic, identifying intent) until the early 19th century.

=== Earliest evidence ===
The "Sobieski Stuarts" (1842) and later D. W. Stewart (1893) made much of some changes to the feu duty paid in woven cloth by locals of Noraboll on the island of Islay to their lords. In 1587, under the Macleans, the cloth was to be white, black, and green; in 1617, under the Mackenzies, the demanded cloth-rent changed to white, black, and grey. These writers were sure, without any further evidence, that this represented a change of clan tartans. (Note: However, not only is it not certain that a single cloth of mixed colours was intended, rather than three cloths of distinct colours, Stewart contradicted himself: When the lands in question were restored to the MacLeans in 1630, the grey did not revert to green but remained gras, i.e. grey. Nevertheless, Stewart asserted: "The explanation is simple enough. White and black and green are the only colours in the oldest authenticated Mac Lean tartan." But that design dates only to the fraudulent 1842 Vestiarium Scoticum and is not "authenticated" by anything; several other (red-based) MacLean tartans date to at least 1819 (STR reference nos. 2603, 2605, and 2606).)

The only clear instance of a clan-based and specific livery tartan to an early date, rather than simply regional and later regimental uniformity, is found in a 1618 letter from Sir Robert Gordon of Gordonstoun (in the employ of the Earl of Sutherland) to Murray of Pulrossie, chieftain of the Murray branch in Sutherland but subordinate to the Earl of Sutherland, chief of Clan Sutherland (in turn recently become subordinate to the Gordon earls). The letter (rediscovered in 1909) requested Pulrossie "to remove the red and white lines from the plaides of his men so as to bring their dress into harmony with that of the other septs" of Sutherland. The letter does not specify the tartan to which to conform; there have been sharply conflicting interpretations, and it is not even certain that it was a tartan that survived to the present. (Note: The Scottish Tartans Society seemed to think it was something very similar to Black Watch, with the red-and-white-striped Murray of Pulrossie version somehow, despite its 1618 prohibition, eventually becoming the primary Sutherland tartan. Innes of Learney also supported the interpretation that it was a dark Black Watch-style tartan, related to others used in the region. On the other hand, House of Gordon USA, a clan society, proclaims: "It was a Red Gordon!", referring to a primarily red and teal tartan, also known as old Huntly, recorded in 1819, and appearing in a "stripey" variant, with differing warp and weft, in the 1766 painting of William Gordon. The society does not publish any basis for their assertion.)

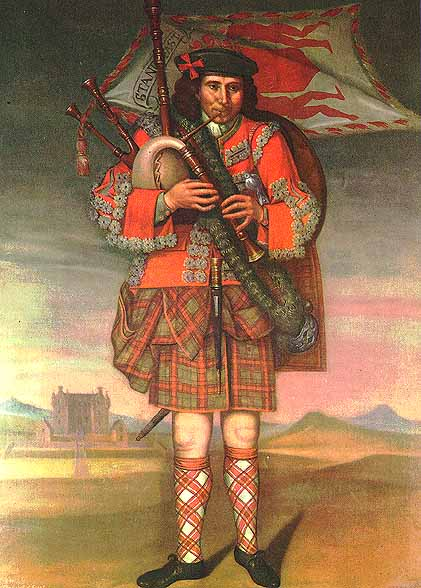
This 1714 portrait, by Richard Waitt, of the piper to the chief of Clan Grant does show a broad green-ish and red tartan, but it does not match any modern Grant pattern. (Note: The piper's name was William Cumming. Telfer Dunbar (1979) describes this tartan, and that of a companion portrait of Alastair Grant Mòr "the Champion", as also showing thin yellow over-checks which are not really visible in this photo. He also describes the green as "grey".)

A case of general colour-matching: In 1703–04, the chief of Clan Grant ordered that his "fencible" men obtain clothing in red and green tartan (vaguely described as "broad springed" but not specified in detail). The material seems not to have been provided by Grant for them in a centralised way, but left to each man to furnish by his own means (on penalty of a fine). "He did not order them to wear the 'Clan Grant Tartan', as one would expect if such a tartan existed at that time." Some of the modern Grant tartans also use red and green; one was designed by Wilsons of Bannockburn in 1819 as "New Bruce" and shortly adopted by both Grant of Redcastle and Clan Drummond; one was reconstructed from an 1838 portrait; another first appeared in the dubious Vestiarium Scoticum of 1842; and so on – none with pre-19th-century history. Nevertheless, D. W. Stewart (1893) proclaimed on this thin material that here was "a complete chain of evidence ... of the existence of a uniform clan pattern at the very start of the eighteenth century" – despite his own observation that portraits of leading members of the Grant family in this era do not show them wearing consistent tartans, much less ones that agree with modern "official" Grant tartans. (Note: This problem of no consistent tartans in old family portraits recurs in other clans, such as Murray and MacDonald, going back to the 18th century. Trevor-Roper (1983) also notes this inconsistency among Highland portraits, as does Haswell Miller (1956).) Scarlett (1990), though thinking this presaged "the Clan Tartan Idea", notes that "had the men of Strathspey been accustomed to wearing uniform tartans it would not have been necessary to order them to do so" (twice over). He also observes that the lairds of Grant in this period were unusually bent on uniformity, one of them even issuing moustache regulations for clansmen; the Grant red-and-green order cannot be taken as typical of everyday Highland practice. Telfer Dunbar (1979) notes that Highland military discipline hardly existed: "To these independent Highland chieftains restraint of any kind was irksome and unbearable, and to impose any rigid military discipline on their followers ... [was] found to be impossible." Nevertheless, Mackay (1924) corroborates Grant militia wearing a livery tartan in 1715.

In 1718, Allan Ramsay (the writer, father of the artist by the same name) published the poem Tartana, which combined colours with Latinised family names: "... If shining red Campbella's cheeks adorn .... If lin'd with green Stuarta's Plaid we view ... Or thine Ramseia, edg'd around with blue ...." This has sometimes been taken as evidence of early clan tartans, despite possibly just referring to the edging and lining of garments (coloured facings were common on jackets of the time). (Note: Willie Scobie, in 2012, railed against "an influential and determined body of opinion set against the idea of clan tartans having existed prior to the late 18th century", analysed the Tartana lines in light of known clan tartans, found no correspondences aside from the Royal Company of Archers (supposedly using a Stuart tartan, which in reality they did not, and not being a clan anyway) having green edging on their jackets, and nevertheless decided: "we have in this piece of literature strong (one is almost tempted to say irrefutable) evidence of the existence of clan tartans in the year 1718.") Worse for this hypothesis, the Campbell tartans are predominantly green, Stuart/Stewart red, and Ramsay red and green. The extant red Campbell tartans are all modern reconstructions of patterns (that are unlike each other) from portraits; Stewart/Stuart tartans with significant green date to the early 19th century or much later; and the Ramsay blue hunting sett dates to 1950.

A Victorian volume, Old and New Edinburgh (1884) by James Grant, stated that one Rev. Joseph Robertson MacGregor "attired himself in a full suit of the MacGregor tartan" in 1782, upon repeal of the Dress Act. But it misquoted the original source (and contained other errors). The original, A Series of Original Portraits and Caricature Etchings (1842) by John Kay, read: "dressed himself in the Highland costume peculiar to his clan", and says nothing of tartan, much less a suit of clan tartan. While 1782 is within the late-18th-century range accepted by some researchers for some informal early clan tartans, this is not clear evidence of one.

=== Lack of further evidence of early adoption ===
John Lesley, bishop of Ross, in 1578 wrote a great deal about Highland customs, including dress, but did not include clan tartans (despite later being claimed to have been the original keeper of the Vestiarium Scoticum clan-tartans manuscript, now known to be a 19th-century forgery). In 1688, William Sacheverell, a Manx politician, described Hebrideans of the Isle of Mull all wearing plaids, but the women in a different style of colour and pattern – not a consistent "clan" tartan. Rev. Thomas Morer in 1689 described Highland garb in some detail, including tartan plaids and hose (made from the same cloth), but mentions no clan patterns. Daniel Defoe (c. 1720) wrote also in considerable detail of Highland warriors of the prior century, and noted that the men were organised into "companies, all of a name", each led by "one of their own clan or family", yet he never mentions any distinction between tartans of these different groups, instead describing them all as wearing tartan with red and yellow over-checks, strongly implying a regional style. This pattern of 17th- through 18th-century writings providing specifics of tartan and Highland dress, but nothing about clan tartans, is consistent.

Contemporary portraits show that although tartan is of an early date, the pattern worn depended not on the wearer's clan, but rather regional style and personal taste. They frequently depict subjects wearing multiple tartans at once. Nor do the tartans shown match current clan tartans. For example, the famous painting The MacDonald Boys Playing Golf (1740s), attributed usually to William Mosman but sometimes to Jeremiah Davison, shows them wearing five different tartans, and they are not surviving patterns (except as later reconstructions from the painting). (Note: Thompson (1992) said none of them survive; but the coat of the older boy is in what is now known as "MacDonald, Lord of the Isles", though the sett was reconstructed from the painting.) Period tartans were also often of differing warp and weft (giving more of a striped than checked appearance), unlike modern symmetrical patterns. Sometimes the portraits were copied, but with tartans that do not match, as if the designs were up to artistic whim. As Scarlett (1990) put it:

"[T]hese portraits have one thing in common: in no case does the tartan shown bear any close resemblance to the modern 'Clan' tartan. ... There is a great lack of evidence to show that the pattern of a tartan had any important significance in the early eighteenth century

D. W. Stewart (1893) had also noted this, about both portrait tartans and "examples of tartan fabrics which can be proved to date from the risings of 1715 and 1745". Many of the portraits by Allan Ramsay the younger show the same shoulder plaid but with colours changed, suggesting it was the artist's own studio prop and used for modelling purposes by his clients who apparently did not care about the tartan pattern. According to Scottish National Portrait Gallery keeper A. E. Haswell Miller (1956):

Authentic documentation of the tartan previous to the 19th century is limited to a comparatively small number of contemporary portraits, and is negative so far as it provides any suggestion of heraldic significance or "clan badge" intention.

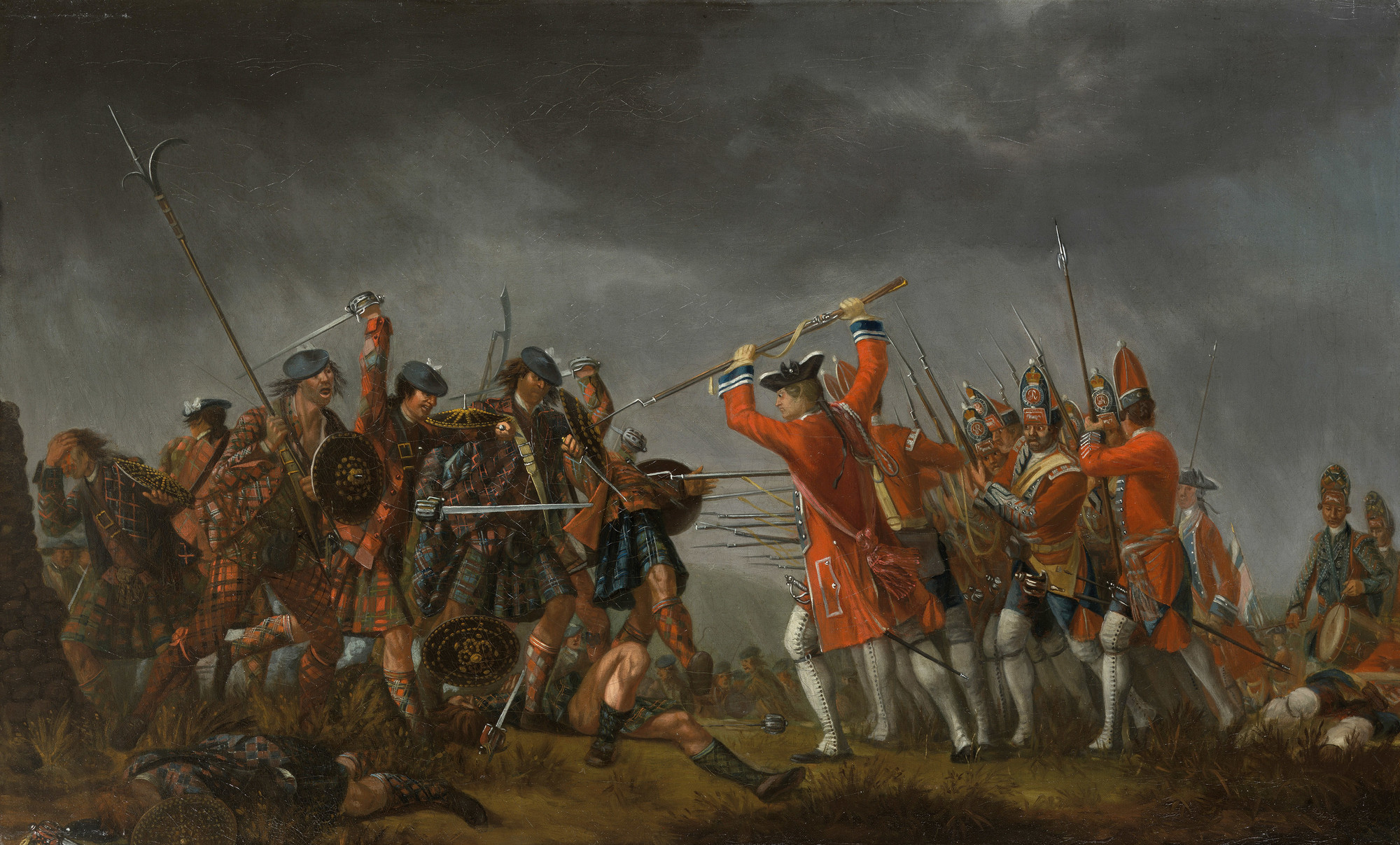
David Morier's An Incident in the Rebellion of 1745. The tartans shown generally do not resemble modern ones.

According to Trevor-Roper (1983):

contemporary evidence concerning the rebellion of 1745 – whether pictorial, sartorial, or literary – shows no differentiation of clans, no continuity of setts.... Tartans were a matter of private taste, or necessity, only.

David Morier's well-known mid-18th-century painting of the Highland charge at the 1745 Battle of Culloden shows eight Highlanders wearing over twenty different tartans which have been analysed in detail; very few of the setts painted resemble today's clan tartans, though they are similar to existing samples of tartan cloth from the era. (Note: A legend started by Lord Archibald Campbell (1890), who was working from a copy of the painting not the original, is that in his words: "No more conclusive proof of distinctive clan colours has been exhibited and it silences all dispute on the question at once and for all time." Modern researchers do not take this seriously. E.g., J. Telfer Dunbar's evaluation: "This is an extraordinary claim as the tartans are clearly and accurately shown and not one of them agree with any clan tartans as known when Lord Archibald was writing or even to-day." Scarlett (1990) pointed out that Campbell himself claimed, later in 1899, that the models for the painting were Jacobite prisoners. If that were the case, they could be wearing whatever they were told to put on, even material supplied by the painter; i.e. the tartans depicted would be accurate representations of the cloth of the period but could not signify anything, even if they did match. The Jacobite Relics and Rare Scottish Antiquities Exhibition of 1946 agreed that the models were prisoners.) The method of identifying Highlander friend from foe was not through tartans but by the colour of the bonnet's cockade or ribbon, or perhaps by the different plant sprigs worn in the cockade of the bonnet. (Note: James Ray, who served in the government forces at the Battle of Culloden, wrote in 1752: "In their flight I came up with a pretty young Highlander, who called out to me, Hold your Hand, I'm a Cambell. On which I asked him, Where's your Bonnet? He reply'd, Somebody have snatched it off my Head. I only mention this to shew how we distinguished our loyal Clans from the Rebels; they being dress'd and equip'd all in one Way, except the Bonnet; ours having a red or yellow Cross of Cloath or Ribbon; theirs a white Cockade". Telfer Dunbar (1979): "If it had been possible to distinguish a Campbell by a 'Clan Campbell' tartan, either Ray would have done so or else remarked on the fact that the man was not wearing an identifiable tartan.") (Note: A Journal of the Expedition of Prince Charles Edward in 1745, by a Highland Officer provides this account: "We M'Donalds were much preplex'd, in the event of ane ingagement, how to distinguish ourselves from our bretheren and nighbours the M'Donalds of Sky, seeing we were both Highlanders and both wore heather in our bonnets, only our white cockades made some distinction". Telfer Dunbar (1979): "If all the MacDonalds wore the same tartan, surely the writer would have mentioned this rather than the heather which they wore in their bonnets. A common tartan would have been much more confusing than a sprig of heather." Also, this particular case does not demonstrate that all the clans had different emblematic plants. Clan plants, like clan tartans, were solicited from chiefs in the early 19th century by the Highland Society of London, and there is no evidence of widespread assignment before then – only this single-clan mention in one period source.) In particular, the government Highland militia forces wore a badge in the form of a black cockade with red saltire; according to Mackay Scobie (1946), "each individual wore his own Highland dress with varied tartans, with the only uniform part being the 'Hanoverian' cockade and large coloured cross on the bonnet." A 1745 letter on the Jacobite troops at Culloden describes "all ye Forces as well Horse as foot were in Highland Dress except ye body Guards wh. wore Blue bound wth Red"; i.e., only the bodyguards were wearing a uniform, and it was not of Highland dress.

One of many tartan legends has it that the Highland-dress ban of the Dress Act was enacted because tartans were used as clan-identifying symbols or uniforms, but not a trace of this idea can be found in period sources. To the contrary, Burt (1727–37) was explicit that English objection to Highland dress (since perhaps 1703–04) was general, because the garb served to distinguish the Highlanders as a people apart from the Lowlanders and other British (not distinguish Highlander from Highlander). (Note: And because the belted plaid in particular, as very practical for outdoor wear but not as work clothing, was believed to be conducive to a life of idle shirking and outright banditry.) Defoe (c. 1720) likewise mocked Highland dress as what he saw as a clownish costume that set Highlanders apart from everyone else, not each other. Similarly, in an account of Jacobite trials, it was asked whether defendants had worn "Highland cloaths" in general, with no mention of clan-identifying patterns. Extant MacDonald tartan fragments from the Battle of Culloden do not match each other or any current clan tartan named MacDonald. Lord President Duncan Forbes of Culloden, keen on punishing the Jacobites with disarmament and other penalties, wrote a detailed letter laying out pro and con points (mostly con) regarding the proposed Highland-dress ban before Parliament passed it, yet never indicated anything like clan tartans, something that would have been a key argument to address.

C. C. P. Lawson (1967) raised a point of logic: "Remembering the continuous clan feuds and the consequent state of more or less perpetual hostilities, a recognisable clan plaid would have been a positive danger to the wearer outside his own territory." This may explain why the handful of early apparent examples of groups of men in similar tartan seem to have the nature of militia uniforms and are mentioned in the context of "fencible" bodies or outright battle (possibly aside from the 1618 case). (Note: Even the Sutherland/Pulrossie letter of 1618 referred specifically to "the plaides of his men", which is suggestive of his militia, not his entire clan.) Lawson also states: "The '45 supplies no evidence that tartans were used as clan insignia .... Relics of those tartans which were worn at Culloden or of the pre-1745 period bear no resemblance to any known modern tartan." The Lord Lyon King of Arms in 1948, Sir Francis James Grant, wrote that pre-1745 tartans were qualitatively different from those of the 19th century and later. Scottish United Services Museum curator Dunbar (1979) notes this as well.

The Jacobite poets wrote much about the rousing appeal of Highland clans and Highland dress, even tartan specifically, but never mentioned clan tartans. Similarly, multiple large volumes of traditional Highland folklore were collected and published by John Francis Campbell in 1860–62 (revised 1890–93), and Alexander Carmichael (who also collected tartan samples) in 1900, but the period materials in them are devoid of any recorded references to clan tartans (despite post-dating the popularisation of the notion among city-dwellers and the upper class).

The idea of groups of men wearing the exact same tartan as an identifier is thought to originate (aside, again, from the odd 1618 case) from Highland regiment units in the 18th century, starting with the Black Watch in 1739/1749. According to Trevor-Roper (1983):

[I]t was probably their use of it which gave birth to the idea of differentiating tartan by clans; for as the Highland regiments were multiplied ... so their tartan uniforms were differentiated; and when the wearing of tartan by civilians was resumed, and the romantic movement encouraged the cult of the clan, the same principle of differentiation was easily transferred from regiment to clan.

Particular regiments were often dominated by men raised from the same clan lands, and this may have blurred the line between regimental uniform and clan-identifying tartan. (And several tartans of extinct regiments survive today as clan tartans.) Newsome (2006) writes: "the practice of clans wearing these regimental tartans may have in fact been the inspiration for the 'clan tartan' system as we now know it." Telfer Dunbar (1979), on the idea of the early Independent Highland Companies using distinct uniform tartans: "I feel sure that here we have much of the 'clan tartan' origin." The end of the 18th and beginning of the 19th centuries brought an unprecedented level of influence of military clothing styles, including Highland regimental, on civilian attire (even for women), especially among the social elite connected to regiments. Some regimental tartans appear to have been named after their commanding officers, and this may be how they came to be associated with family/clan names over time. Banks & de La Chapelle (2007):

the notion of differentiation of tartan by clans might have evolved from this desire to distinguish on Highland regiment uniform from another. Certainly, its classification for military use laid the groundwork for many subsequent designs and the movement toward uniformity.

Scarlett (1990) also observed the connection to regional or "district" tartans:

[B]asic patterns prevailed over wide areas and were modified by local weavers for their own ends. It can easily be seen that a local pattern of this kind, made for a captive clientele, might have become identified with the people of that locality who were themselves predominantly of one Clan or family group and its adherents and, when the belief grew up that Clan tartans had been worn since the beginning of time, have become, by retrospection, the Clan tartan of that group. There is no evidence that the Highlanders themselves looked on tartan in that light, however ....

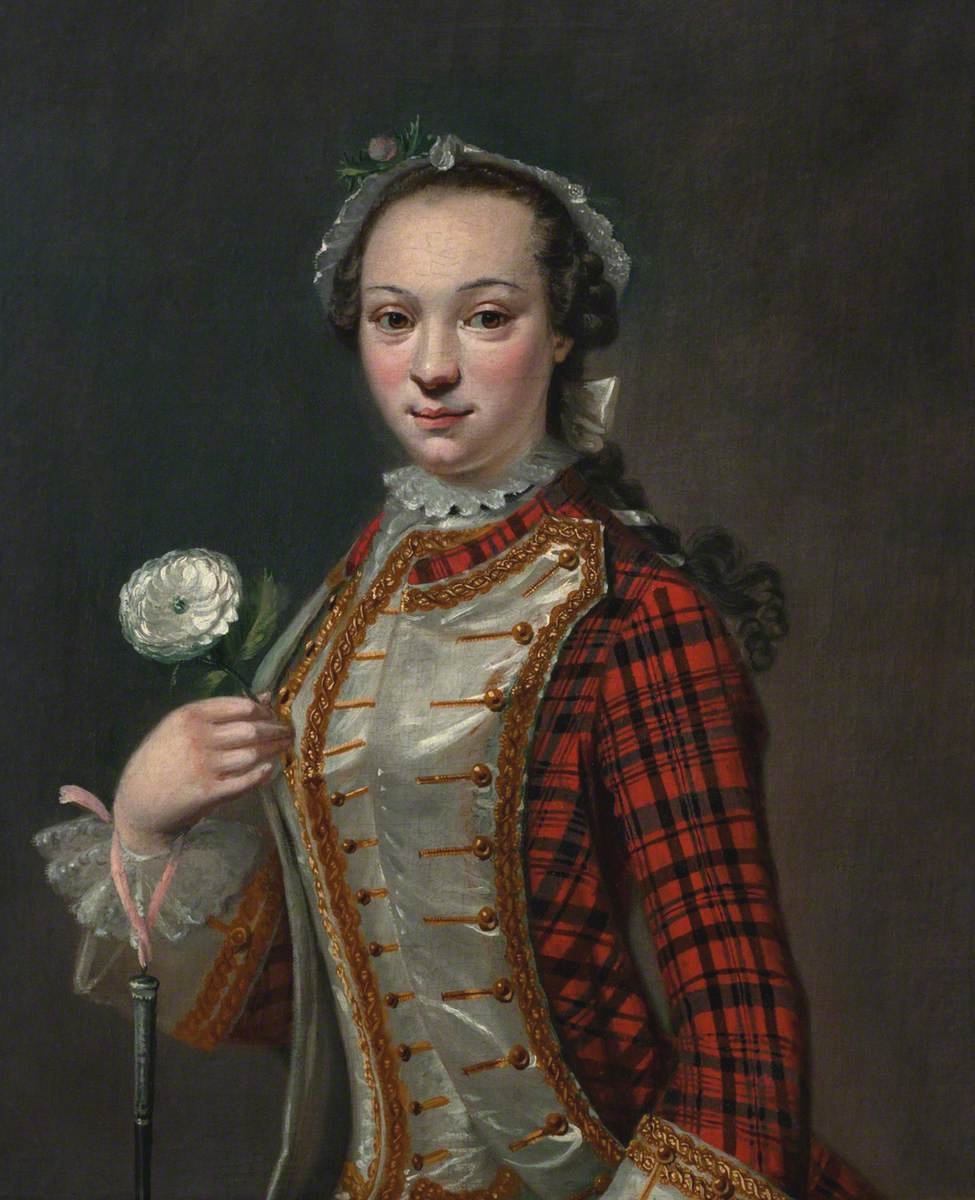
Unknown Jacobite lady in Tullabardine tartan, c. 1740–1750, attributed to Cosmo Alexander

Haswell Miller (1956) similarly noted: "We can ... readily accept that certain dyes would prevail in different regions and that traditional types of pattern might be followed in various parts." Martin Martin in 1703 had described tartans as being identifiably specific to particular regions, but not clans. There are numerous cases of tartans loosely associated with districts later becoming clan tartans. The best-documented case is the Tullibardine pattern, one of the few modern clan tartans that can be traced (at all, not as a clan tartan) to the pre-proscription period. It was long associated with Perthshire, and later adopted as the Murray of Tullibardine clan tartan, but sold by Wilsons as simply "Tullibardine" as late as c. 1830–40, and it was found for sale in a market by W. & A. Smith around 1850, who also said it was worn then by Charles Murray, Earl of Dunmore; the first record of the pattern as "Murray of Tullibardine" is in their 1850 book. It appears in at least five early portraits; four date to c. 1740–1750, the first of an unknown female sitter attributed to Cosmo Alexander, (Note: Sometimes said to be Jean "Jenny" Cameron, without conclusive evidence; there are five other identity candidates.) and three by Allan Ramsay (with the cloth painting completed by Joseph van Aken) which are not of any known Murrays (but of a Campbell, a MacLeod, and a MacDonald). It is not until 1770 that a known Murray is painted wearing it (John Murray, Earl of Dunmore, by Joshua Reynolds), which still does not necessarily make it a "clan tartan" at that early a date ("evidence for its historic use by that branch [of Clan Murray] is circumstantial at best"). The oldest version of it differs slightly as to colours and sett from the modern clan version. (Note: Another legend, started by James Grant (1886), has it that the tartan goes back to "Charles, first Earl of Dunmore, second son of the first Marquis of Tullibardine", but this was just a bad mis-reading of the Smith brothers (1850), from whom Grant plagiarised, referring to the then-current Earl of Dunmore.)

Similarly, according to the Scottish Register of Tartans, the district tartan for Huntly, originating in more complex form as the personal tartan of a Marchioness of Huntly (probably Henrietta Mordaunt), was in use as a regional tartan since at least "the '45", and worn at Culloden by clansmen of Brodie, Forbes, Gordon, MacRae, Munro, and Ross, "which gives a strong indication of the greater antiquity of the 'District' setts compared to the Clan tartans."

Some surviving early records of tartan manufacture are those of the Orphan Hospital Manufactory and Paul's Work, in Edinburgh, for the period 1734–37 and 1751–52; tartans were not named but given numeric designations such as "No. 2nd". In 1745, the Caledonian Mercury of Edinburgh carried an advertisement for a "Great Choice of Tartans, the newest Patterns" – not clan or even district tartans, but newly devised ones, suggesting a fashion market driven by novelty not supposed "heraldic" traditions. Even clan-tartans booster D. W. Stewart (1893) conceded: "This advertisement, it may be urged, is a stumbling-block in the way of those who argue for the antiquity of clan patterns; for it seems peculiar that, when the city was filled with Highlanders of all ranks and many clans, they should be offered not their ancient setts ...." Other advertisements for tartan from 1745 to the early 19th century did not mention clans, or focus on the patterns at all, but rather on the forms in which the cloth could be ordered. Even immediately after the repeal of the Dress Act in 1782, the demand was for "latest patterns and bright colours", with no hint of a family heraldry aspect.

William Wilson & Son of Bannockburn, just south of the dividing line between the Highlands and Lowlands, were the first large-scale commercial tartan producers; founded c. 1765, they had become the foremost supplier of tartan to the military by around 1770, and the dominant tartan weaver in general. It was an endeavor that required the introduction of tartan recording, of standardisation of setts and dyes, and of consistency and quality control. Wilsons corresponded with their agents (especially the son, James Wilson) in the Highlands to get information and samples of cloth from the various districts to enable them to reproduce "perfectly genuine patterns". Wilsons recorded over 200 setts in addition to ones they designed in-house, collected in their 1819 Key Pattern Book of around 250 setts (among earlier in-house volumes to the 1770s). These tartans were numbered, named after places, or given fanciful names such as "Rob Roy", later sometimes family names (after prominent members), sometimes foreign names like "Coburg", but usually not those of clans, nor, when they did, often matching present clan patterns. (Note: E.g., Telfer Dunbar (1979) provides this example: Wilsons' popular "Gordon" was green, purple, and black with over-checks of seven colours, and "unlike the present clan pattern".) A large proportion of the modern clan tartans, however, can be traced to this work – just often originally with numbers or unrelated names. The evidence of direct adoption from Wilsons happening frequently completely overwhelms "ancient clan tartans" sentiment. (Note: One example is today's Macpherson, adopted in 1817, which was originally "Caledonia" then "No. 43", "No. 155", or "Kidd" in Wilsons' pattern books. (There is no "Clan Kidd"; the Kidd in question was a bulk orderer who used the tartan to clothe slaves in the West Indies. Confusion seems to have arisen when Wilson also assigned the pattern the name "Macpherson" after another West Indies customer by that name. Another is Campbell of Cawdor, originally "No. 230" or "Argyll", after the county. A complex example is the case of Abercrombie or Abercromby. Logan (1831) first published the tartan usually used for this name, but he modified it from an 1805 Wilsons tartan record for "No. 64" or "Abercrombie", named for Sir Ralph Abercrombie not an entire family. The design first popular for "Abercrombie" in the early 18th century changed names somehow to Graham then later became today's Graham of Montrose tartan. Wilsons' "Abercromby with yellow" is today's Campbell of Breadalbane after also being used by a fencible regiment. The main Buchanan tartan, famous for being asymmetric, originated as a Wilsons fashion tartan around 1800 and was not adopted as a clan tartan until the 1830s. "Logan" was invented by Wilsons, named after a merchant, and changed several times until it sold well. "Drummond" was originally Wilsons' "Perth". Wilson's 1819 pattern "Regent" turned into the MacLaren clan tartan by 1830, with a shift from purple to blue. Scarlett (1990) and the Scottish Register of Tartans provide numerous other examples of modern "clan" tartans actually just being renamed generic/fashion/fancy, regimental, and famous-individual tartans from Wilsons, when they were not taken from the later forgery Vestiarium Scoticum.)

The Scottish National Dictionary, in providing an unusually discursive definition of tartan, includes: "[T]owards the end of the 18th century and largely through the enterprise of Messrs Wilson, weavers in Bannockburn, a series of tartans, each ascribed to a certain clan, was devised and is now accepted as authoritative, though almost entirely unhistorical." Analysing the direct and strong influence of Wilsons' Key Pattern Book (KPB) on the later adoption of clan tartans, Eslea MacDonald (2012) concluded:

Some of the 1819 KPB setts no longer retain their original names, others were altered or were the basis for a number of variations which were named or simply numbered .... Whatever their origins, these patterns gave rise to the idea of clan tartans as we know them today. In a very few cases a pattern's origins may have indeed been a lot older than the 1819 KPB but their contemporary names were almost always the work of Wilsons or subsequent writers.

The Cockburn Collection of 56 tartan samples (some of them duplicates) was put together between 1810 and c. 1825 (most likely 1816–25) by Lt.-Gen. Sir William Cockburn, and is now in the Mitchell Library in Glasgow. This collection does ascribe particular family names to many of these setts (probably naming them after prominent individuals), but only sometimes corresponding to current clan tartan associations (indeed, some patterns that are today associated with particular clans were given multiple different names in the Cockburn Collection). (Note: A prime example is the Black Watch tartan, which Cockburn collected four times and assigned the names "Campbell Argyll", "Grant", "Munro" and "Sutherland".) There are many conflicts in name-to-pattern associations between this collection and that of the Highland Society of London around the same time.

Even David Stewart of Garth, who was to become one of the chief proponents of the idea of clan tartans, observed in 1814 only that various heads of families seemed to have selected personal tartans and that there were also district tartans. When Garth and his Highland Society of London solicited clan tartans from chiefs in 1815, Col. Alexander Robertson of Struan, Chief of Clan Robertson/Donnachaidh/Duncan, wrote back:

It does not appear to be appertained, either by tradition or by authentick history, that the different Clans in the Highlands of Scotland, wore any distinctive pattern or tartan. It is well known that they all had particular Colours, or Standards, emblematical of some of their most honourable attachments, but as far as I have been able to discover, they wore no uniform Garb.

At the beginning of the 19th century, a letter from an Inverness tailor to Wilsons of Bannockburn requested fine tartan cloth to be used for women's clothing, because the fashion was to wear husbands' regimental tartans (not clan tartans). In 1829, responding negatively to the idea of Lowland and Borders "clans" wearing their own tartans, Sir Walter Scott – who was instrumental in helping start the clan-tartans fervour in the first place – wrote "where had slept this universal custom that nowhere, unless in this MS. [the draft Vestiarium Scoticum, published ultimately in 1842] is it even heard of? ... I would rather suppose that the author had been some tartan-weaver zealous for his craft, who wished to extend the use of tartan over the whole kingdom." Also in the same year, he wrote: "The idea of distinguishing the clans by their tartans is but a fashion of modern date in the Highlands themselves".

Another of the tartan legends has it that Alexander Gordon, 4th Duke of Gordon, commissioned the design of a clan tartan based on Black Watch in 1793, kept one of three designs, then passed the other two on to cadet branches of the family. This tale can be traced in unembellished form to 1793 records of weaver William Forsyth of Huntly which do not say this at all, only that Forsyth provided three potential designs for a regiment tartan, with yellow over-checks in various configurations, of which the Duke selected no. 2 for the unit, the 92nd Gordon Highlanders.

Scarlett (1990) surmises that there must have been some informal clan tartans – a confluence of district tartans that had become associated with particular families, and adoptions of regimental uniform tartans by them – by the late 18th century, otherwise there is no explanation for where Stewart of Garth got the idea. Scottish United Services Museum curator Maj. I. H. Mackay Scobie (1942), Haswell Miller (1947), and Barnes & Allen (1956), also zeroed in on this timeframe. Eslea MacDonald (2010-11) observes, for example, the Murrays using the common Tullibardine regional pattern in portraits and in bed hangings at their clan seat, Blair Castle, 1770 – c. 1780 and possibly earlier. Telfer Dunbar (1979), considering the 1703–04 Grant proclamation and the early regiments, suggests that "any uniformity of tartan was only to be found in an organised body of troops, or the 'tail' or following of a chief." These possible comparatively early, informal clan tartans of the late-18th-century simply cannot usually be identified (when they survived) until the early 19th century.

=== 19th century broad adoption ===
It has been suggested by a modern chief of Clan Campbell and another of the clan executives that the clan had informally adopted what is now known as old Campbell or Black Watch tartan by the early 19th century, because so many of their men were already wearing it as part of regimental uniform (three of the Independent Highland Companies that amalgamated into the Black Watch regiment in 1739–1751 were Campbell units). Some time in or after 1806, when he became clan chief, the city-dwelling politician George Campbell, 6th Duke of Argyll, created his own personal tartan, of Black Watch with a thin over-check of white and yellow added, "to differentiate himself from the rest of the Campbells", i.e. because they were already so often wearing Black Watch. This essentially may have been one of the earliest attested surviving clan tartans (and the duke's variant was an early declared personal tartan of a noble). (Note: According to a documentary, Clan Gregor, the Gordons, and a MacDonald branch might also have had early informal clan tartans around this period. However, the chief of the MacDonalds indicated not knowing of a clan tartan in 1815, and the tartan that was the subject of the 1618 Gordon/Murray/Sutherland letter is uncertain.)

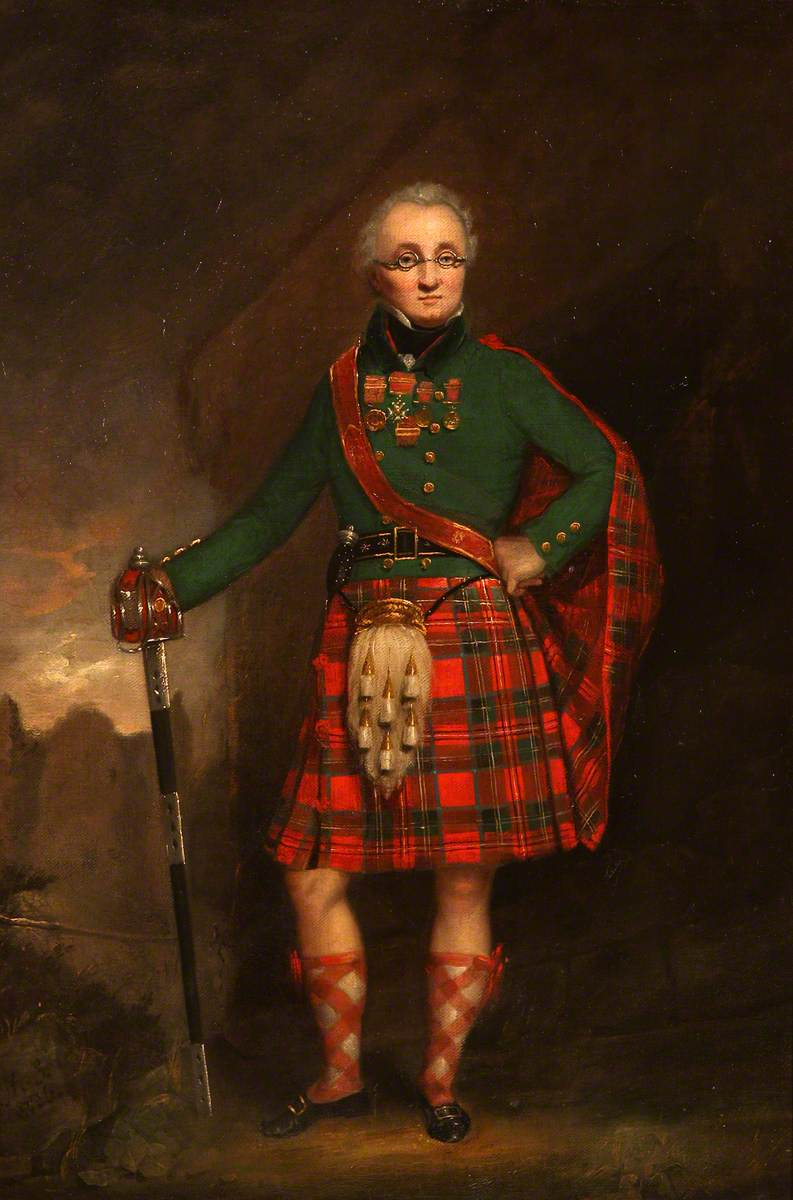
Maj.-Gen. David Stewart of Garth, c. 1820, in royal Stewart tartan

The idea arose among Scottish expatriates (especially in the Celtic societies, which encouraged members to wear "appropriate" tartans), eager to "preserve" Highland culture, that tartans had traditionally been named and that the names represented clan affiliations. Among them was Maj.-Gen. David Stewart of Garth, a Black Watch veteran and vice-president of the Highland Society of London (founded 1778). He and fellow members Sir John Sinclair and Andrew Robertson were among the first proponents of the idea of clans being identified by tartans, despite the lack of evidence. (Note: Stewart of Garth may have had financial motivations for promoting an aristocratic "tartanry" or "Highlandism" and attaching his name to it prominently – like many other Scottish lairds, he was in dire fiscal shape.) The society also counted among its members the Prince of Wales (the future George IV, who was to become instrumental to clan "tartanry" in 1822) and two dukes, among various itinerant actual Scots – including James Macpherson of "Ossian" fame (or infamy).

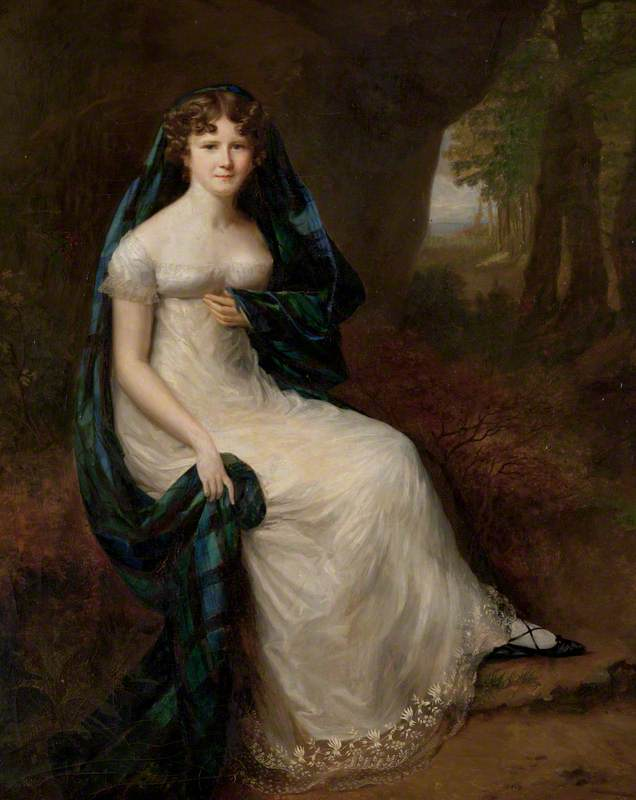
Elizabeth Gordon (née Brodie), Duchess of Gordon, c. 1813–1814 by Alfred Edward Chalon; she appears to be wearing Black Watch (42nd regiment) tartan, as it lacks the yellow over-check of 92nd Regiment, which became the Gordon clan tartan. This was only about a year before the Highland Society solicited clan patterns.

On 8 April 1815, the society resolved that the clan chiefs each "be respectfully solicited to furnish the Society with as much of the Tartan of his Lordship's Clan as will serve to Show the Pattern and to Authenticate the Same by Attaching Thereunto a Card bearing the Impression of his Lordship's Arms." Many had no idea of what their tartan might be or whether they had one, some provided only a vague description, and some claimed they had none. But plenty were keen to comply and to provide authentic signed and sealed samples; many (possibly most) turned to Wilsons of Bannockburn for a design, while some directly adopted a regimental tartan as their own, (Note: At least six at once claimed the Black Watch regimental tartan, and "Several chiefs were asked to resubmit a different tartan in order to be seen to be different and thus support the idea of historical clan tartans." In some cases, minor alterations were made, e.g. Forbes was devised in 1822 by adding a white over-check to Black Watch.) and still others adapted designs from old portraits of clan nobles. (Note: There are numerous examples, but a prominent case is that two of the Lord of the Isles tartan variants were taken from portraits dating to the third quarter of the 18th century. This practice, incidentally, has contributed to confusion about the age of clan tartans; a tartan adopted officially by a clan in 1850 from a painting dating to 1750 might misleadingly be said to be "a clan tartan dating to 1750".) Alexander Wentworth Macdonald, Baron Macdonald, wrote back to the society: "Being really ignorant of what is exactly The Macdonald Tartan, I request you will have the goodness to exert every Means in your power to Obtain a perfectly genuine Pattern, Such as Will Warrant me in Authenticating it with my Arms." Finding no agreement within his clan on a pattern, Robertson of Struan ended up adopting the regimental tartan of the Loyal Clan Donnachie (Robertson) Volunteers; being based on the Black Watch pattern, it could not pre-date the late 18th century. On the other hand, Sir John Macgregor Murray of Clan Gregor, who had spent most of his life in England and India, was writing instructions on the use of his clan's tartan by December 1818. In 1819, Wilsons were engaged in correspondence to "send ... specimens of all coloured Tartans used by these Clans ...said to exceed thirty in number", to a writer in Italy preparing a book on clan tartans; the same year, they also produced their Key Pattern Book of over 200 tartans (representing only a fraction of their total tartan output, presumably the most marketable designs, and not always under the same names as found in contemporary collections of Wilsons' tartan samples such as the Cockburn collection and that of the Highland Society).

According to Trevor-Roper (1983), Wilsons were in a direct "alliance" with the Highland Society of London by 1819; the former saw a great marketing opportunity, and the latter provided a veneer of respectability as Wilsons helped the society pin tartans to clan names. Banks & de La Chapelle (2007) concur: "The Wilson firm worked in tandem with the Highland Society, preparing tartan samples for the latter to certify as belonging to one clan or another." Clan nobles (who sometimes contradicted each other, within the same clan, on what their tartan was or should be) were apparently also "ready to adopt changes at the mere dictation of fancy" to improve designs. From the "authentications" they received 1815–26, the society built up a clan-tartan collection (now in the National Museum of Scotland), with 34 authenticated specimens and about 40 others. (Note: The authenticated samples bore seals of clan chiefs, while submissions received without such authentications were sealed by society secretary George Wedderburn. The society collected tartans in general as well, and amassed 586 by 1987.) Other such societies generated more interest, belief, and demand. According to the analysis by Eslea MacDonald (2012), "Most of the pieces sealed [by clan chiefs] and deposited with the Society at that time were patterns woven, and in the majority of cases appear to have been designed, by Wilsons. This obviously means they could not have existed prior to c1765 when William Wilson started his business." So many of Wilsons' stock tartans from their Key Pattern Book of 1819 were being renamed for clans that J. C. Thompson (1992) wrote: "Clearly the naming of tartans was just getting started in 1819", and: "There was nothing people wanted more than an ancient clan tartan system, and they were determined to have one." By 1821, advertisements for tartan cloth had shifted to include language like "true", "warranted", and "original", and began to stress antiquity and family connections.

The 1822 visit of George IV to Scotland, in Highland garb and with a great deal of tartan-festooned public ceremony (arranged by Stewart of Garth and romanticist writer Sir Walter Scott of the Celtic Society of Edinburgh), had a profound tartan-boosting effect, including the invention of new clan-specific tartans to suit (or renaming of old tartans to have clan names), as clan chiefs had been asked to attend in clan tartans. It caused a boom in the tartan-weaving business, and a broader public notion that tartans should be named for families. "When these two [Scott and Stewart of Garth] stage-managed the King's visit ... they fixed the Clan Tartan idea in the public mind." Wilsons' pattern book in 1822 had expanded significantly with tartans named for clans, in addition to all their numbered setts. According to R. Martin (1988), Wilsons and other weavers were made aware of the king's planned visit three or four years in advance, and had all that time to pad their catalogues with additional designs and to assign clan names to patterns often "probably picked entirely out of the air." He added that "anyone looking at the tartan pattern books of 1819 to 1822 would have realized the cacophony of different names for the same [pattern], the chaos of clan attributions, and the complete capriciousness of that association." A telling letter from a tailor, archived among the Wilsons papers, to the company in 1822 asked: "Please send me a piece of Rose tartan, and if there isn't one, please send me a different pattern and call it Rose."

By 1824, an invitation to the Atholl Gathering, one of the earliest of the modern Highland games festivals, made it clear that participants should arrive "in the plaids or Tartans of their Clans". In 1829, Sir Thomas Dick Lauder complained to Walter Scott about all the "uncouth, spurious, modern [tartans] which are every day manufactured, christened after particular names, and worn as genuine", and also of "clans ... at this moment ignorantly disputing for the right to the same tartans which in fact belong to none of them but are merely modern inventions for clothing Regimental Highlanders". Scott himself was backpedalling away from what he had helped create, and was suspicious of the recent claims about "ancient" clan tartans: "it has been the bane of Scottish literature and disgrace of her antiquities, that we have manifested an eager propensity to believe without inquiry and propagate the errors which we adopt too hastily ourselves."

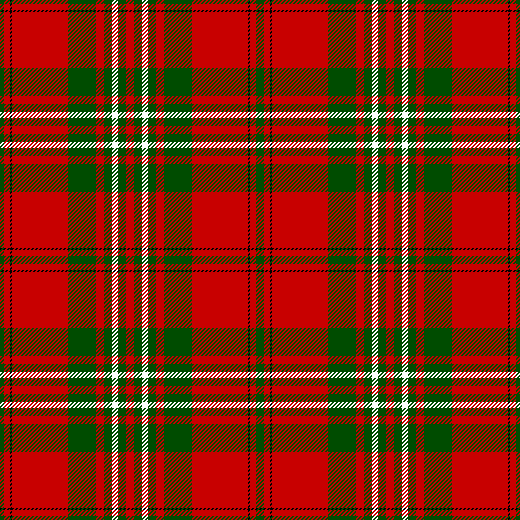
The Scott tartan invented by the "Sobieski Stuarts" around 1829, eventually published in the 1842 Vestiarium. Based on the c. 1819 MacGregor, the tartan was rejected (along with other Lowland family tartans) by Walter Scott, but remains the most popular Scott tartan.

A wave of highly dubious books were published, all purporting to reveal true clan histories and tartans; they presented little in the way of evidence, but they caused enthusiastic adoption of clan tartans. The first of these, in 1831, was The Scottish Gaël or Celtic Manners, as Preserved Among the Highlanders by James Logan, containing 54 tartans (based on Wilsons' collection, that of the Highland Society of London, and other sources he alleged but did not name, plus some he collected or devised himself); the author ignored advice from Wilsons on which were actually old tartans, and included some erroneous, fictitious, and incomplete setts. (Note: Some faulty (according to Wilsons) clan patterns included in Logan (1831) were those for Abercrombie, Douglas, and Graham, but there were more.) He also included untenable assertions about the designs' antiquity; "Logan took the line that everything Highland was rooted impossibly far in the past", and was mocked in The Pall Mall Gazette for it. Meanwhile, Wilsons and other weavers simply adopted some patterns from his book due to demand, and also took to inventing all-new "clan tartans" to keep up with the growing market for patterns associated with names. The archived correspondence of Wilsons in the 1830s shows that the company was frequently pressured by merchants for the "truest" and "real" clan patterns. Logan, despite himself being involved in sham clan tartanry, observed that "fanciful varieties of tartan ... were being passed off as genuine" by Wilsons and other weavers.

Logan was followed in 1842 by Vestiarium Scoticum by the so-called Sobieski Stuarts, purporting to contain 75 centuries-old clan tartans, illustrated in great detail but from vague textual descriptions. Although it is now known to have been largely a forgery, (Note: In fairness, only most of the tartans in Vestiarium were made up; almost a dozen had previously appeared in collections like those of Cockburn and Wilson. Telfer Dunbar (1979) also considered that the Sobieski Stuarts' more general material on the history and then-present of Highland dress was of considerable value, at least when its sources could be traced. Of the tartans material, Walter Scott fairly charitably wrote that the brothers had "an exaggerating imagination, which possibly deceives even themselves".) many of the visual tartan designs in this "final – and fantastic – codification" of clan tartans were nevertheless adopted and still survive as accepted tartans of clans, especially for Lowland clan names (which had hitherto never been associated with tartan or Highland garb at all). Starting in 1822, Borders families had been redefining themselves as clans, and the book encouraged more of them to take on clan tartans and open clan societies. Modern critics have even praised the lasting socio-cultural accomplishement of the Sobieski-Stuarts' works in helping establish a systemic clan-tartans legend while recognizing the bogus nature of their material. (Note: R. Martin (1988): "I would like to excuse the prevarications of the Sobieski-Stuart brothers with a nod to Baudrillard; they lied and they cheated, but they did something quite extraordinary in ascribing a meaning to textile design that has more or less stuck: false as it is, the Sobieski-Stuarts fostered a myth of textile identification and implication that has served a continuing and compelling social need for well over a hundred years. They may have been factually wrong, but culturally very right.")

Trevor-Roper (1983) believed that the Sobieski Stuarts had been in direct communication with manufacturers like Wilsons, and were advising clan chiefs on which tartans to choose, from as early as 1819; J. C. Thompson (1992) agreed. Dick Lauder certainly said they were doing so by 1829, and that Wilsons were already weaving many Sobieski Stuart samples by that year; the company's own records the same year confirm orders for designs from the Sobieski Stuarts. Vestiarium was followed soon after by The Costume of the Clans published by the Sobieski Stuarts in 1845; the illustrations it provided, allegedly based on portraits, have proven to be largely a mixture of error and invention. By 1849, John Sobieski Stuart was in discussion with a publisher to produce a new, cheaper edition of Vestiarium, in a series of small volumes "so that it might be rendered as available as possible to manufacturers and the trades in general concerned in Tartan ... and it was for the[ir] advantage and use ... that I consented to the publication." The same letter also proposed binding the manufacturers by contract to produce tartans that conformed exactly to the Sobieski Stuarts' specifications.

Weavers like Wilsons were complicit, not passive, in the tartan boom. They had lost much of their military and export markets after major wars ended and colonies in the Americas and elsewhere had become more self-sufficient. "The concept of differentiated clan tartans, newly popularized, was codified and developed by canny manufacturers .... Since the repeal of the [Dress Act], these tartan makers saw the prospect of a vast new market." According to Alastair Campbell of Airds:

One factor which has been decisive throughout the history of the development of the modern system [of clan tartans] has been the influence of the tartan manufacturers .... As with any marketing organisation it was important to maintain a steady flow of "new products", and every year new patterns were produced .... The idea of individual tartans providing a clan or family identity was a most attractive one, which was adopted enthusiastically by both wearer and seller alike.

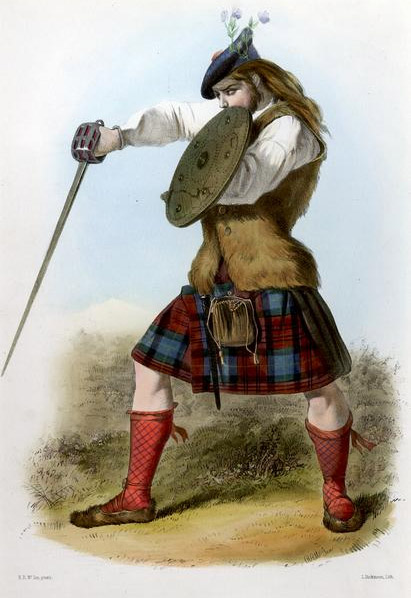
"Maclachlan", a romanticised Highland warrior image from Logan and McIan's The Clans of the Scottish Highlands, 1843

This heavy promotion for decades of the clan-tartans idea has been described as "inciting a rush to lay claim to the tartan to which one's family was 'entitled'". Other 19th-century clan-tartan works followed. Logan (by then president of the Highland Society of London) returned, with illustrator Robert Ranald McIan, with The Clans of the Scottish Highlands in several volumes 1843–1849, which had inconsistently hand-coloured portraits of chiefs in clan tartans, which he stated were "acknowledged by the present chiefs and clans". The Clans of the Highlands of Scotland in 1850 by Thomas Smibert drew heavily on Wilsons' patterns and on Logan. In the same year, Authenticated Tartans of the Clans and Families of Scotland by William & Andrew Smith was based on trade sources such as Wilsons, competing mill Romanes & Paterson of Edinburgh, and army clothier George Hunter's pre-1822 collection of setts (and some consultation with historian W. F. Skene). Also in 1850, Gen. James Browne published History of the Highlands and the Highland Clans, another Vestiarium knock-off.

In 1871, Gaelic folklorist and Highland dress fancier John Francis Campbell of Islay wrote in Clan Tartans:

I have come to the conclusion that Sir Walter Scott and my friends the Editors of the Vestiarium Scoticum and Scotch Manufacturers of tartans are together responsible for the present flourishing and luxuriant crop of brilliant clan tartans .... I do not believe that the distinctions which are now made as to Clan Tartans ever prevailed at all, till Tartan became an important manufacture in Scotland in the reign of George the 4th

J. Claude produced the tartan pattern sample book Clans Originaux in Paris c. 1880, and some tartans were adopted from it, (Note: E.g., the usual tartan of Clan Home dates to Clans Originaux. Another is Brodie hunting; it was also later included in Old & Rare Scottish Tartans. A third is MacBean.) though its 185 samples were mostly of already-known tartans. A second edition of The Costume of the Clans was published in 1892. Another influential book was Donald W. Stewart's Old & Rare Scottish Tartans (1893), which included swatches of fabric; several accepted clan tartans date to this work.

Books of this era also introduced lists of alleged clan septs, families of different surnames (often of English, Norman, or other non-Gaelic derivation) supposedly linked to particular clans as "extended family". It was a means of greatly increasing tartan sales by attaching many more names to extant tartan designs, but not well-grounded in any historical reality. Two such works, both published by W. & A. K. Johnston were: Tartans of the Clans and Septs of Scotland by James Grant in 1886, revised by Henry Whyte in 1906 in more of a picture-book format (three tartans make their first appearance in the 1886 edition, and various more in the 1906 version, with no provenance); and What Is My Tartan? or, The Clans of Scotland, with Their Septs and Dependents by Adam Frank in 1896.

The romanticised notion of clan tartans had become deeply embedded in the Scottish imagination and further afield. "[I]t all got mixed up in the public mind and the myth of tartan as a kind of heraldry became established, not only in the eyes of outsiders, even the Clansfolk believed it". On the cusp of the Scottish Renaissance and Gaelic Revival, most clans (including major Lowland families) had been assigned and had generally accepted one or more tartans by the late 19th century.

=== 20th century consolidation ===
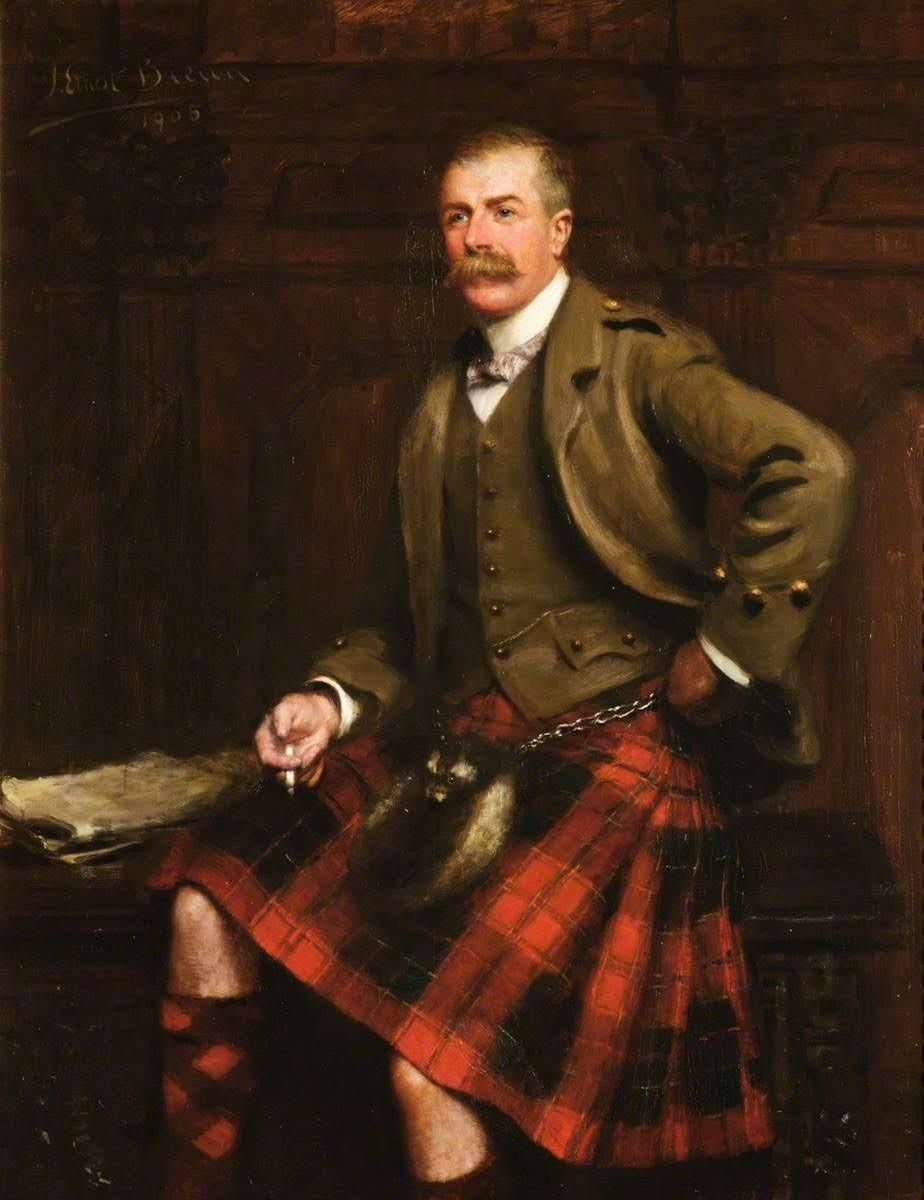
Charles E. N. Leith Hay, 1905 portrait by John Ernest Breun, in Edwardian daywear Highland dress, kilt in a dark rendition of the Hay and Leith tartan. Most clan tartans were settled by the turn of the 19th and 20th centuries.

The first Edwardian book on the subject (aside from a larger 1906 "library edition" of Whyte as The Scottish Clans and Their Tartans with Notes), was Frank Adam's 1908 The Clans, Septs & Regiments of the Scottish Highlands, which remains in print today (though in drastically edited form, by Sir Thomas Innes of Learney). A variety of books, with colour plates, had been affordably and widely published about clan tartans by the mid-20th century. Three popular ones were The Clans and Tartans of Scotland by Robert Bain, 1938 (the first to use photographic halftone prints; revised and updated many times through 1983); The Tartans of the Clans and Families of Scotland by Innes of Learney (later to become the Lord Lyon King of Arms as well as a founder of the Scottish Tartans Society), 1938, advancing some clan-tartanry ideas his Lord Lyon predecessor Sir Francis James Grant considered "humbug"; and The Scottish Clans & Their Tartans published by W. & A. K. Johnston, 1945 (later editions re-titled The Scottish Tartans with Historical Sketches, edited by Innes of Learney), and based on previous works by Grant and Whyte. Many others followed in successive decades.

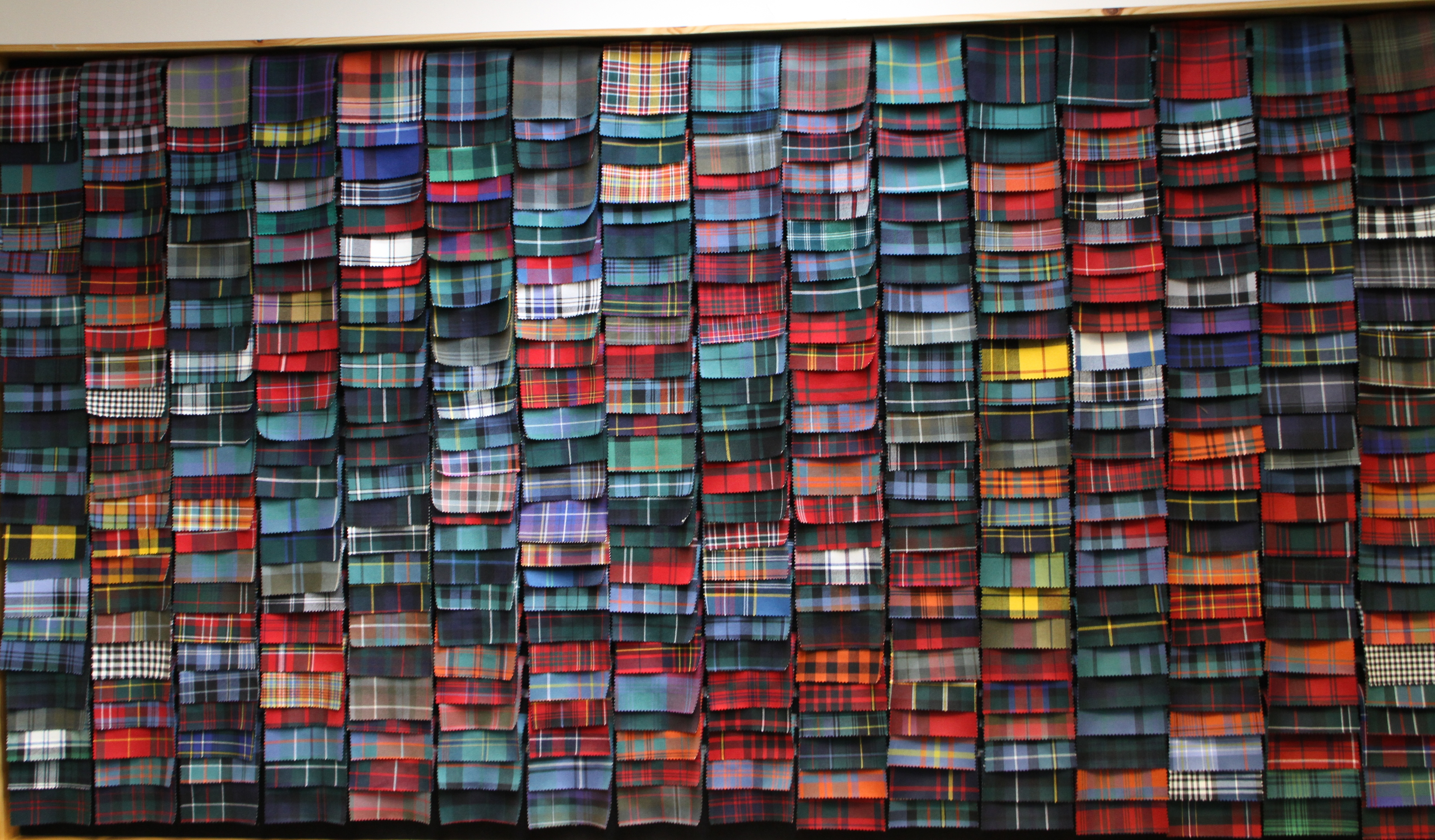
400 clan and district tartan samples at the headquarters of the weaver Lochcarron of Scotland

The mass-market books (some with over 200 tartans illustrated) did much to cement the idea of clan tartans in the public imagination, as well as to consistently anchor particular tartans to particular clans. And the works were in more general agreement with one another than had been the Victorian "authorities". (Note: See Scarlett (1990), chapter "The Setts of the Tartans", for numerous examples of names with 5 or even 10 "clan tartans", most of them traceable to Wilsons, Logan, or the Sobieski Stewarts. For a quick visual example of conflicting claimed clan tartans, many of them dating to the Victorian to Edwardian periods, see the "MacDougal" search results in the Scottish Register of Tartans; the list for that name is not much polluted by recent individual and "fashion" entries.) They also simultaneously increased the number of clans with their own assigned tartans, and reduced the number of tartans claimed to be those of certain clans to a more manageable number, probably after consultation with clan chiefs and clan society officers. They did, however, typically include sept lists, which today are widely regarded as bogus (though many present-day clan associations still use them, as a means of attracting larger membership).

Almost every extant clan (with or without a chief) had at least one tartan associated with it by this era. Many clans have several well-accepted tartans. Sometimes they represent different branches of the family; e.g., there are separate tartans for Campbell of Breadalbane, Campbell of Cawdor, and Campbell of Loudoun, in addition to the general "old" Campbell tartan. In other cases, they are (at least ostensibly) for specific purposes such as hunting, mourning, formal dress occasions, or Highland dance competition; e.g., the MacFarlane dress and hunting tartans are different.

An important, more scholarly work was 1950's The Setts of the Scottish Tartans by Donald C. Stewart (Note: Revised in 1974, D. C. Stewart's The Setts of the Scottish Tartans has been further updated and expanded by James D. Scarlett in 1990 as Tartan: The Highland Textile, perhaps the most definitive work on tartan published so far (though by no means the largest in terms of number of tartans illustrated; it is a book of research not of pictures).) (son of the aforementioned D. W. Stewart). The younger Stewart has been hailed as "the founder of serious tartan research"; originated now-standard methods for indexing tartans; and would go on to help expose the Vestiarium Scoticum as a fraud, in Scotland's Forged Tartans, co-authored with J. Charles Thompson in 1980.

In the late 20th century to present, clan and other tartans also have been catalogued in databases. A small number of new official clan tartans (mostly specific-purpose "side" tartans, like dance tartans) were registered in tartan databases in the 21st century. (Note: E.g. the red variant of the 1975 MacGregor dance tartan dates to 2005.)

Regarding modern misrepresentations of clan tartans on historical figures in films and even museums, Scarlett (1990) wrote: "so widely have the tartan myths been spread that any script- or guide-book writer will, in complete ignorance, write the most arrant nonsense and never think that it might not be true. ... Once false information has been disseminated by a supposedly authoritative body it is virtually impossible to correct it."

=== Recognition by clan chiefs ===
The "officialness" of clan tartans has varied widely, and still does today. Although it is possible for anyone to create a tartan and assign it any name they wish, the only person with the authority to make a clan's tartan "official" is the chief.

Some clans have had no chiefs for some time, while only a majority subset of those with living chiefs in the modern era made direct proclamations as to their clan tartans and registered them with the Lord Lyon. (Note: Electric Scotland published an annotated list of clans and their tartans' Lord Lyon registration status. The list is much shorter than some other clan lists, because it omits clans that have not applied to the Lord Lyon for tartan registry at all; it lists only those with Lyon-recorded tartans or those then in process of such registration.) Some time after the launch of the Scottish Register of Tartans (SRT) in 2009, the Lord Lyon stopped recording clan tartans, deferring to SRT for this purpose. Some of the clan tartans were simply adopted by custom, (Note: Example: The Clan Watson tartan dates to c. 1932 and appears to have been created by one of two ministers (sources disagree), based on the MacRae hunting and Gordon tartans.) and have remained rather consistent into the 21st century. A clan booth at a Highland games event is likely to proudly display at least their best-known clan tartan, regardless whether a chief has declared it official.

However, some chiefs have been quite adamant about what their clan's legitimate tartans are. Some time prior to 1890, George Campbell, 8th Duke of Argyll, chief of Clan Campbell, is said to have specified the main Campbell tartan, as distinct from that of the Campbell of Cawdor sett, after a portrait had depicted him in the latter and also supposedly at the prompting of the War Office, perhaps with regard to Argyll and Sutherland Highlanders uniforms. Ian Campbell, 12th Duke of Argyll, Clan Campbell chief in the late 20th century, excoriated attempts to claim there were other than the four aforementioned particular Campbell tartans (and specifically rejected the personal-variant tartan of the 6th Duke). Similarly, Sir Malcolm MacGregor, chief of Clan Gregor, wrote in 2012 that only four MacGregor tartans (plus a newer dance tartan) are legitimate, out of 10 or more alleged ones found in a tartan database, which he blamed on "indiscriminate commercialisation ... disingenuous and lead[ing] to confusion".

In at least one instance, a clan tartan appears in the coat of arms of a clan chief and is considered by the Lord Lyon as the "proper" tartan of the clan: The crest of the chief of Clan MacLennan is A demi-piper all Proper, garbed in the proper tartan of the Clan Maclennan. (Note: The Highland MacLennans use the same tartan as the Lowland Logans. Clan Logan is without a chief.)

Some chief-authenticated clan tartans are quite late arrivals. In 1961, the Clan Davidson main tartan was replaced (and registered with the Lord Lyon) by one of multiple disputed chiefs, Sir David Davidson of Allt Dinnie, with a design dating to 1893, in place of an older white-striped version. Chief Charles Shaw of Tordarroch in 1971 replaced the old Shaw tartan (a Black Watch variant based on a misprinted image in Logan & McIan (1847)) with a new pair (dress and hunting) designed in 1969 by D. C. Stewart based on more historical sources. Clan Mar had no approved tartan until Chief Margaret of Mar registered one in 1978 (from a design that may pre-date 1850); their dress/red tartan was not adopted until 1992 (from a design dating to the 18th century). The MacLeod red tartan was approved by Chief John MacLeod of MacLeod in 1982, to join much longer-standing yellow and blue tartans of the clan; it was based loosely on what appears in a 1748 portrait of Chief Norman MacLeod by Allan Ramsay and Joseph van Aken. Baron David Lumsden of Cushnie-Lumsden in 1996 approved the Clan Lumsden hunting sett by Peter Eslea MacDonald (though technically the baron was just the chieftain of the Cushnie-Lumsden branch). In 1998, Chief Dugald MacTavish of Dunardry approved a 1958 design as the MacTavish dress tartan. In 2005, Chief Gillem Lumsden of that Ilk registered a new main Lumsden tartan with the Lord Lyon, based closely on that of a c. 1790 Lumsden family waistcoat. Also in 2005, a pattern for Duncan of Sketraw was approved by Chieftain John Duncan of Sketraw, based on a 1930s design. In 2007, Chief Fergus D. H. Macdowall of Garthland designed the Clan MacDowall tartan (the clan previously used MacDougall or Galloway district); he registered it with the Lord Lyon and Scottish Tartans Authority in 2008. The Cochrane hunting tartan was designed personally by Chief Iain A. D. B. Cochrane, Earl of Dundonald, in 2008. The Clan Carruthers tartan was approved by Chief Simon Peter Carruthers of Holmains in 2017.

== Modern general use ==
Aside from regimental and clan usage, tartan has seen broad (and sometimes highly politicised) use by the general public in the modern era. By the 19th century, the Highland romantic revival, inspired by James Macpherson's "Ossian" poems and the writings of Sir Walter Scott, led to wider interest in tartan and other things felt to be Gaelic and Celtic. Clubs like the Celtic societies welcomed Lowlanders, and tartan was rapidly appropriated as part of the Scottish national identity (and part of broader British dress as a familiar exoticism).

=== Late Georgian ===
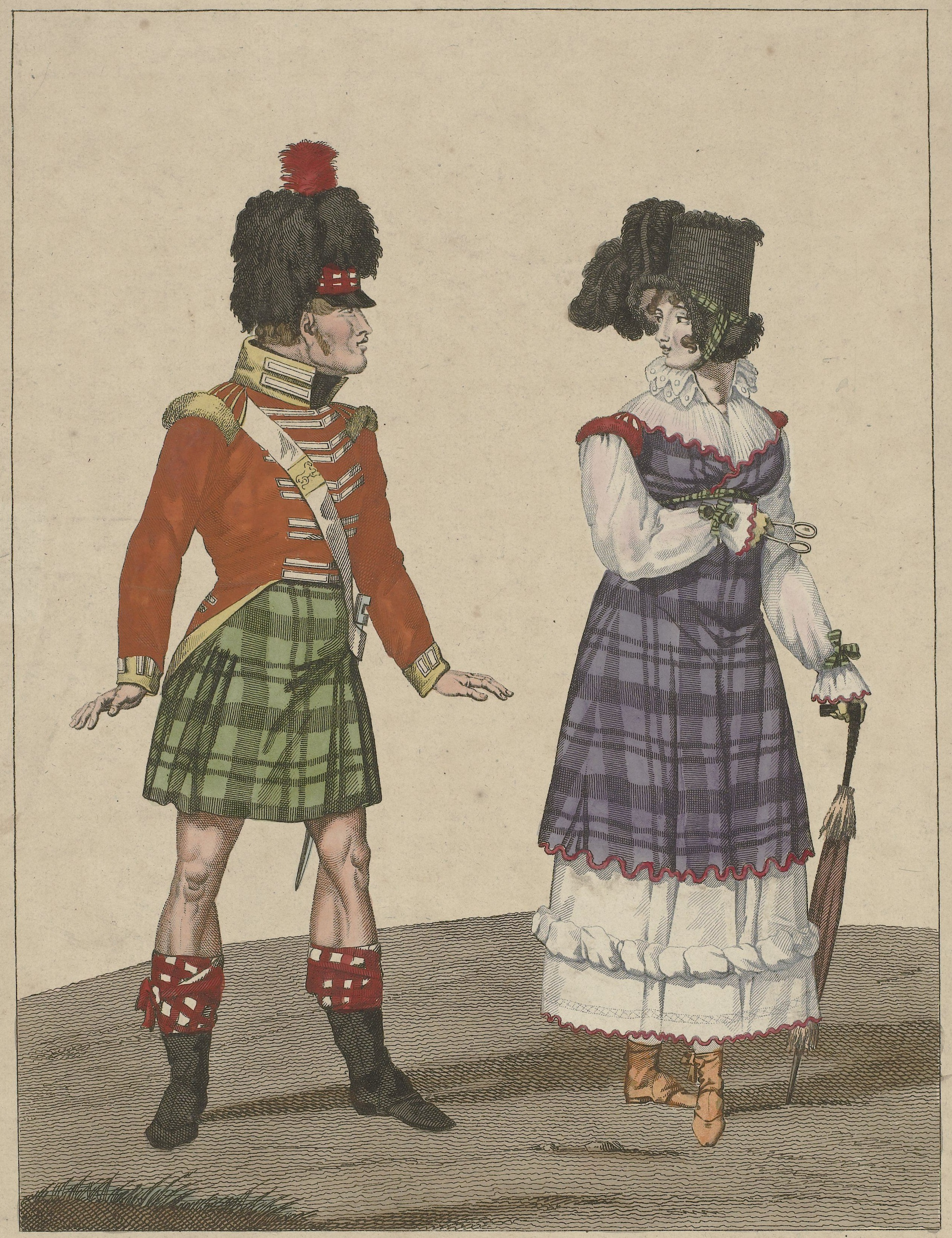
"The New Fashion, or The Scotsman in Paris", from a series of Parisian fashion prints, 1815

The period of widened public interest in tartan and Highland dress after the repeal of the Dress Act in 1782 has been called the Highland Revival. (Note: Eslea MacDonald (2022) defines this "Highland Revival" period as the 1782 end of the Dress Act to the beginning of Victoria's reign in 1837. The utility and accuracy of this term when constratined to Victoria's accession is questionable, because revivalism of Highland cultural trappings did not abate during her reign but actually intensified markedly. Also, the term tartan revival has been used, with essentially the same meaning, though without closely prescribed dates.) While tartan had already seen more nationwide use from 1707, as a Scottish nationalism symbol against union with England, it was turned on its ear to become a romanticised symbol of union loyalism in the early 19th century, an era in which prominent conflicts caused a patriotic influence of military (including Highland) style on civilian clothing, (Note: In this era, soldiering, especially as an officer, was the "aristocratic profession par excellence", and this had a strong effect on fashion. In Highland dress of the period, sometimes civilian and military styles were commingled.) even among women despite its overtly masculine focus. First among the northern gentry and later among the common people more broadly, there was a renewed interest in tartan and Highland dress, despite the long period of prohibition – largely due to the glory associated with the Highland regiments' exemplary service in various military campaigns. "Highlandism" became a romantic, mythologised (even fictionalised) and colourful escapism even as Lowland Scotland itself was becoming one of the most industrialised places on earth, and the entire nation was undergoing the social upheavals of union and empire, of large-scale warfare, of urbanisation, and of modernisation during the Scottish Enlightenment. The bloody French Revolution of 1789–1799 had also helped inspire a British setting aside of old Stuart and Hanoverian rivalry.

Before the clan tartans rush began in 1815, tartan was already being aggressively marketed to the general public as "fancy" cloth with names that commemorated famous events and people, even fictional characters from books and songs, e.g. "Waterloo", "Flora MacDonald", "Sir Walter Scott", "Wellington", "Maggie Lauder", and "Meg Merrilees". This inspired a novel perception that tartans should be named. Some of the designs by leading weaver Wilsons of Bannockburn by this period were considered recognisable on sight.

In 1822, Maj.-Gen. David Stewart of Garth, who was with both the Highland Society of London and the Celtic Society of Edinburgh, published Sketches of the Character, Manners, and Present State of the Highlanders of Scotland, the first of a number of 19th-century books lionising the Highlanders, the clans, and the tartaned regiments. The various Celtic/Highland societies throughout Britain had already been driving a rise in tartan demand since the late 18th century. The societies liked wearing Highland dress – in their own assimilated, urban idiom, (Note: Not to universal approval. The chief of Clan MacDonell of Glengarry wrote of a Celtic Society of Edinburgh gathering: "I never saw so much tartan before in my life, with so little Highland material ... they have no right to burlesque the national character or dress of the Highlands.") such as tartan frock coats – and devising new tartans; it has been suggested that they were engaging in a sort of "internal colonisation", imposing what they wanted to see rather than simply recording what was traditionally Highland. Aside from tartan fabric's increasing use in non-Highland styles of clothing, Highland dress itself had already become highly stylised, quite removed from the simplicity of its peasant origins; this was a trend that would continue throughout the later Victorian period.

==== The King's jaunt in tartan ====
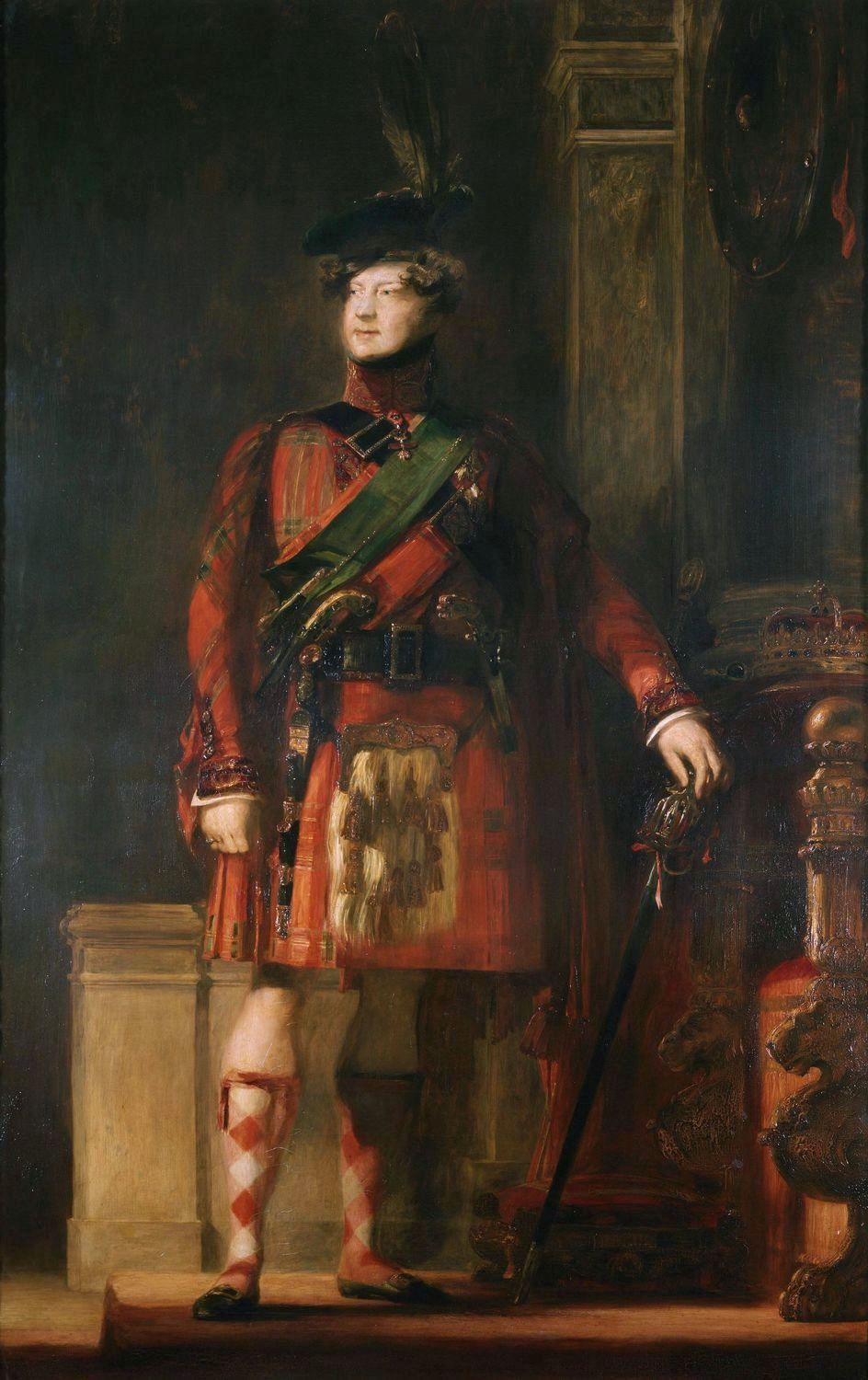
George IV in Highland Dress. David Wilkie's idealised depiction of the king, in full Highland regalia, during his visit to Scotland in 1822. (Note: David Wilkie's portrait of George IV depicts the king as being much slimmer than he actually was. Wilkie covered up the fact that the king's kilt was too short – sitting well above the knees – and also left out the pink tights the king wore to hide his bare legs.)

The popularity of tartan was greatly increased by the royal visit of King George IV of the United Kingdom to Edinburgh in 1822, with other nobles including Lord Mayor of London Sir William Curtis, in Highland garb. George was the first reigning monarch to visit Scotland in 171 years. The pageantry invented for the event, which was nicknamed "the King's Jaunt", brought a sudden consumer-driven demand for tartan cloth and made it the national dress of the whole of Scotland. The 21 days of festivities were organised by the Jacobitism-romanticising but staunchly unionist Walter Scott, who was another co-founder of the Celtic Society of Edinburgh, and military officer David Stewart of Garth. They urged Scots (most of whom were Lowlanders) to attend "all plaided and plumed in their tartan array" in "complete national costume". One contemporary writer sarcastically described the pomp that surrounded the celebrations as "Sir Walter's Celtified Pageantry", and another as a "plaided panorama". Clan chiefs, expected to be kilted, had little choice but to take the event seriously, and arrived to show their loyalty in something of a panic, with tartaned retinues of half a dozen to up to 50 per clan (equipped at great expense, and with only about a month's official notice), in a city overflowing with Highlanders, Lowlanders, and English spectators decked in tartan, a sight that Scott's own son-in-law and biographer John Gibson Lockhart called a "Celtic hallucination". Thousands of spectators attended the many events arranged for the visit. The formal ball, reserved for the gentry, required Highland dress for admittance, and some 300 tailors were employed to supply it.

The royal endorsement of tartan and Highland-wear did much to erase any lingering association of them with the servile peasant class of the Highlands (or the region's bands of mountain bandits, for that matter). Because Scott had become "the acknowledged preserver of Scotland's past" through his historical novels, the legend he helped create of tartan and Highland dress as a Scotland-wide tradition rooted in antiquity was widely and quickly accepted, despite its ignoring and erasing of cultural diversity within the country (of Gaels, Norse–Gaels, Scoto-Normans, and Lowlanders of largely Anglo-Saxon extraction). "A bogus tartan caricature of [Scotland] had been drawn and accepted, even by those who mocked it, and it would develop in perspective and colour." George IV's visit – which was not just theatrical but thoroughly political, in marrying Hanoverian power and loyalty to Stuart ideology and pride – has been described in by Angus Calder (1994) as the catalyst by which "a Union of practical convenience became a Union of irrational love and fears, sublimated in militarism, tartanry, royalism and, eventually imperialism". R. Martin (1988) added: "it would seem that this visit presages the acts of orchestrated political propaganda that we have come to know very well in the 20th century."

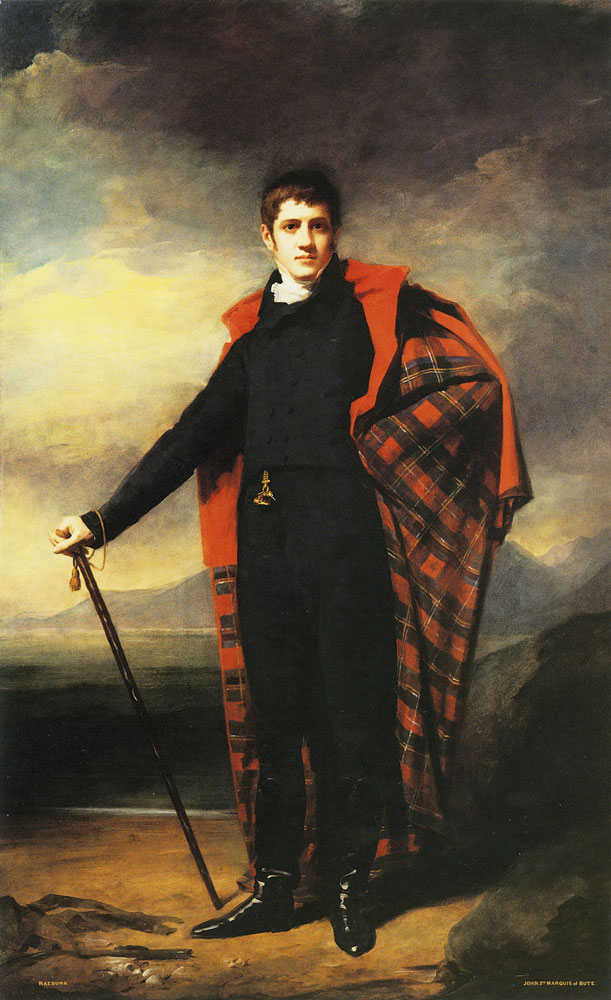
Portrait of John Crichton-Stuart, 2nd Marquess of Bute, by Henry Raeburn, c. 1829, showing adaptation of tartan to Regency-era clothing styles, like this red-lined cloak

Following the royal visit, the tartan industry boomed, and the number of available tartans increased tenfold; in 1822, Wilsons' pattern book had numbered setts in the hundreds, and introduced many more with proper names. Scarlett (1990) writes that "Tartan was no longer the dress of northern barbarians or political dissidents; it had become respectable and the garb of loyal subjects." Books which documented tartans began to appear and added to the "tartanry" craze. James Logan's romanticised work The Scottish Gaël (1831) was the first such publication, and led the weaving industry to adopt new patterns, even Logan's invented or erroneous ones.

The result of these flurries of attention has been described as an "astonishing frenzy of excitement into which [patronage of tartanry] threw the citizens of Edinburgh and much of the rest of Scotland".

==== Civilian spread ====
From the 1820s, Georgian and then Victorian portraiture of clan nobles continued the earlier theme of regimentally re-styled Highland dress, with jewels, gold, and other symbols of aristocracy – a "synthetic Gaelicism". The funerals of Sir John Macgregor Murray and Alasdair Ranaldson Macdonell of Glengarry, in 1822 and 1823 respectively, were marked by tartan, bagpipes, and "wailing" of clansmen – "a feudal sight in an increasingly industrial age". A large public tartan affair was the 1824 Atholl Gathering (an annual event that, after a period of abeyance, continues to the present). From the end of proscription through the Georgian promotion, "distrust of the Highlands became fascination", and tartan and Highland garb "moved from the periphery to the very center, accompanied by all the processes of forgetting and imaginative re-creation". Tartan, no longer the everyday traditional dress of Highland "barbarians", had become, in altered form, all the rage among the Scottish upper and even middle classes as formal attire. This popularisation of tartan increased its marketability in the Lowlands, in England, and in the colonies, and provided a boost to the Scottish textile industry.

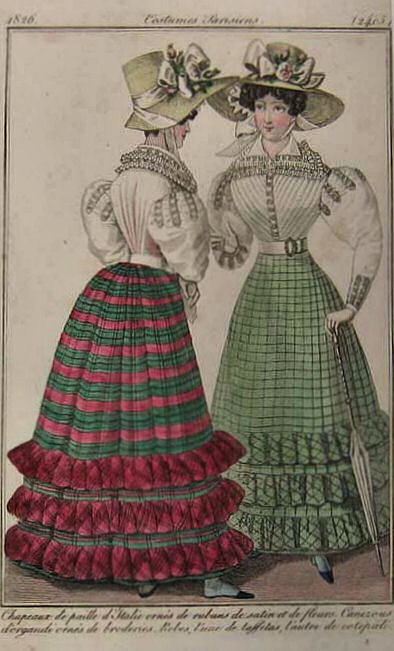
French tartan fashions from Costumes Parisiens, 1826

Tartan had begun making appearances in civilian Georgian fashion throughout Britain and into continental Europe, as illustrated in publications such as London's Gallery of Fashion (1787) and La Belle Assemblée (1808), and (after Paris was famously occupied by Highland regiments during the Waterloo campaign and the fall of Napoleon in 1815) in the French periodicals Le Prétexte (1815) and Costumes Parisiens (1826); tartan was in vogue in Paris in particular in this period, and approximations of Highland soldiers even appeared in Parisian plays at the time. Tartans associated with family names became popular, but there was also a brisk trade in new tartans commissioned for societies, to commemorate events, in honour of famous persons, and designed simply to personal aesthetic taste. Manufacturers struggled to keep up with demand. By 1819, dominant tartan weaver Wilsons of Bannockburn (also a carpet and ribbon weaver) was keenly interested in exploiting the civilian market, due to a reduction in regimental demand, and introduced many more patterns, providing cloth in various grades. By 1820, the company had access to 132 looms; they experienced a four-fold increase in output in 1821, leading up to George IV's visit, after which they acquired 40 more looms in an add-on building, named the Royal George after the king, and expanded into a new mill in 1822, mechanising more and more to keep up with demand. They stopped weaving muslin to focus on tartan, and produced it in a range of qualities from finest merino wool to cheap linsey-woolsey blends, demonstrating that whatever high-class associations tartan had taken on, there was significant working-class demand. In 1829, a merchant wrote to Wilsons that "We are like to be torn to pieces for tartan; the demand is so great we cannot supply our customers", and there was great demand for the newest patterns.

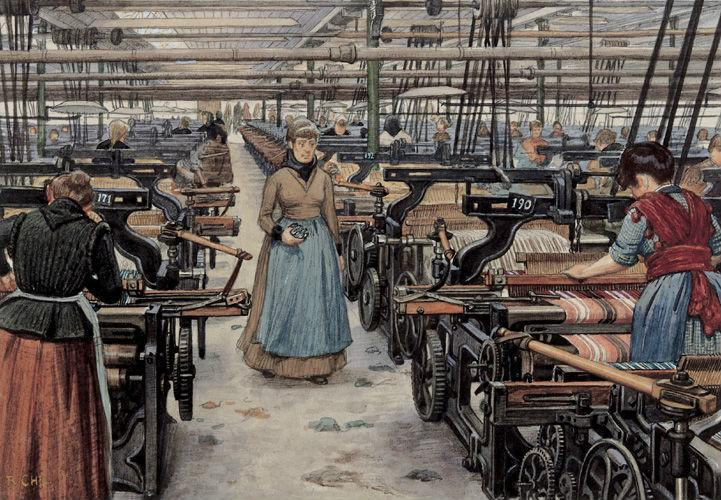
Illustration of Victorian women weaving at power looms in a textile factory (this one in Denmark, but the scene in Wilsons of Bannockburn at its peak would have been very similar).

Georgian and later Victorian entrepreneurs not only created new tartans, but new tartan objects called tartanware, starting as far back as the proscription period in the form of wine glasses decorated with tartan and enamel Jacobite portraits. Tartan decorated an assortment of common household objects, such as snuffboxes, jewellery cases, tableware, sewing accessories, desk items, and even doorknobs and furniture – a tartan knick-knack market for tourists that continues through the present in the Highlands. Visitors to the Highlands went home with tartanware, and Scotland-based businesses sent tartanware out as gifts to customers. Some of the more popular tartans used were the Stewart, MacDonald, MacGregor, MacDuff, MacBeth, and one fancifully named "Prince Charlie". Today, tartanware is widely collected in England and Scotland. There was a symbiotic relationship between tartanware production and interest in tartans generated by books on the subject: a tartanware manufacturer from 1820 onward was W. & A. Smith, of Mauchline, also incidentally the publishers of Authenticated Tartans of the Clans and Families of Scotland (1850).; tartanware was sometimes more specifically called Mauchlinware.

=== Victorian ===
Leading up to the beginning of Queen Victoria's reign in 1837, tartan was a brisk trade in London, Manchester, and other English cities and towns. In 1839, the Eglinton Tournament, a medieval re-enactment featuring jousting and a ball, was organised in North Ayrshire by Archibald Montgomerie, Earl of Eglinton; it drew some 100,000 spectators, who had been asked to attend in plaids, and included George Murray, Duke of Atholl, arriving with an entire regiment in tartan, his newly re-formed Atholl Highlanders (which still exists as Europe's last remaining private military force).

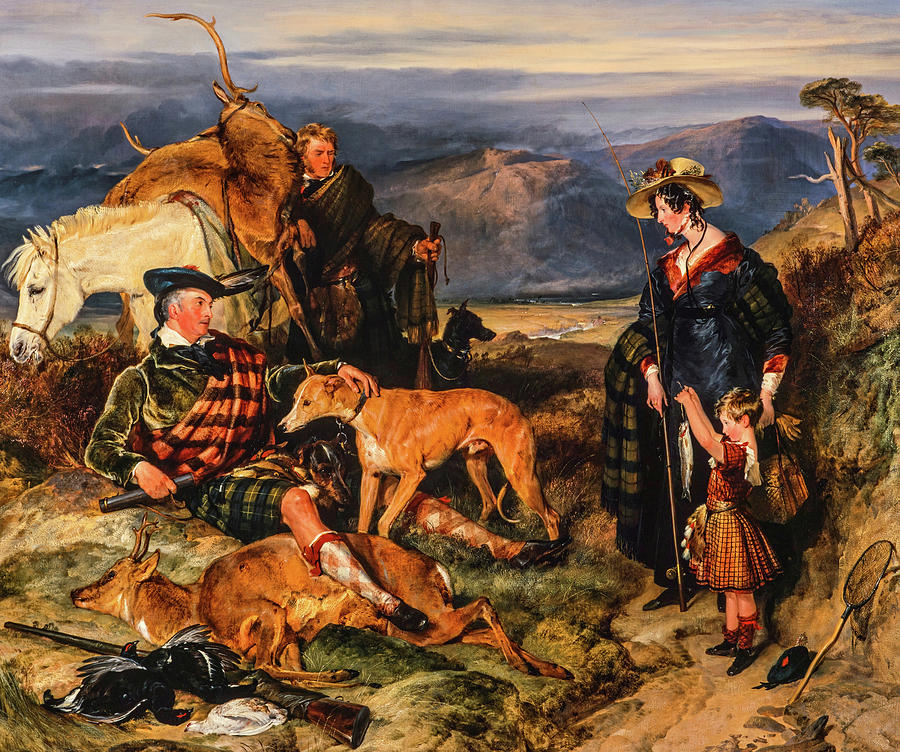
Scene in the Highlands with Portraits of the Duchess of Bedford and Duke of Gordon (in various tartans), by Edwin Landseer, 1825. The Highlands were being cleared of native people, for deer hunting preserves and sheep pastures.

==== Vestiarium Scoticum ====
The first publication showing colour plates of an array of tartans was the Vestiarium Scoticum (meaning 'wardrobe of the Scots'), published in 1842, and it included a first: tartans for Lowland families. It was the work of two brothers: John Carter Allen and Charles Manning Allen, from Surrey, England, who used a variety of assumed names. The two implied they were grandsons of Prince Charles Edward Stuart and Princess Louise of Stolberg-Gedern, and consequently later became known as the "Sobieski Stuarts". They claimed further that the Vestiarium was based on a 1571 manuscript on clan tartans – a manuscript which they never managed to produce. It was not known at the time, but many of the tartans were simply invented by the brothers, and others were taken from early-19th-century sources like the Cockburn and Wilson collections. The brothers heavily favoured basic checks, or crudely divided checks, with thin over-checks added; they had an identifiable style of tartans, assessment of which has varied from "few can be called inspired" to "quite novel and singularly gorgeous". The Vestiarium was followed by their equally dubious The Costume of the Clans in 1845. The books, which "added mystery, romance and some spurious historical documentation to the subject", triggered another wave of interest in tartans, and the enthusiasm generated by these publications led the way for numerous tartan books in the later 19th century. (Note: A detailed summary of the 19th-century tartan books can be found in D. W. Stewart (1893), pp. 57–61.)

The sudden availability (and almost unquestioning acceptance) of Lowland tartans helped spread tartan further in popularity. "The [tartan] cult was gathering strength and tartan was no longer 'Highland', it had become 'Scottish'."

==== The Queen and "Balmorality" ====
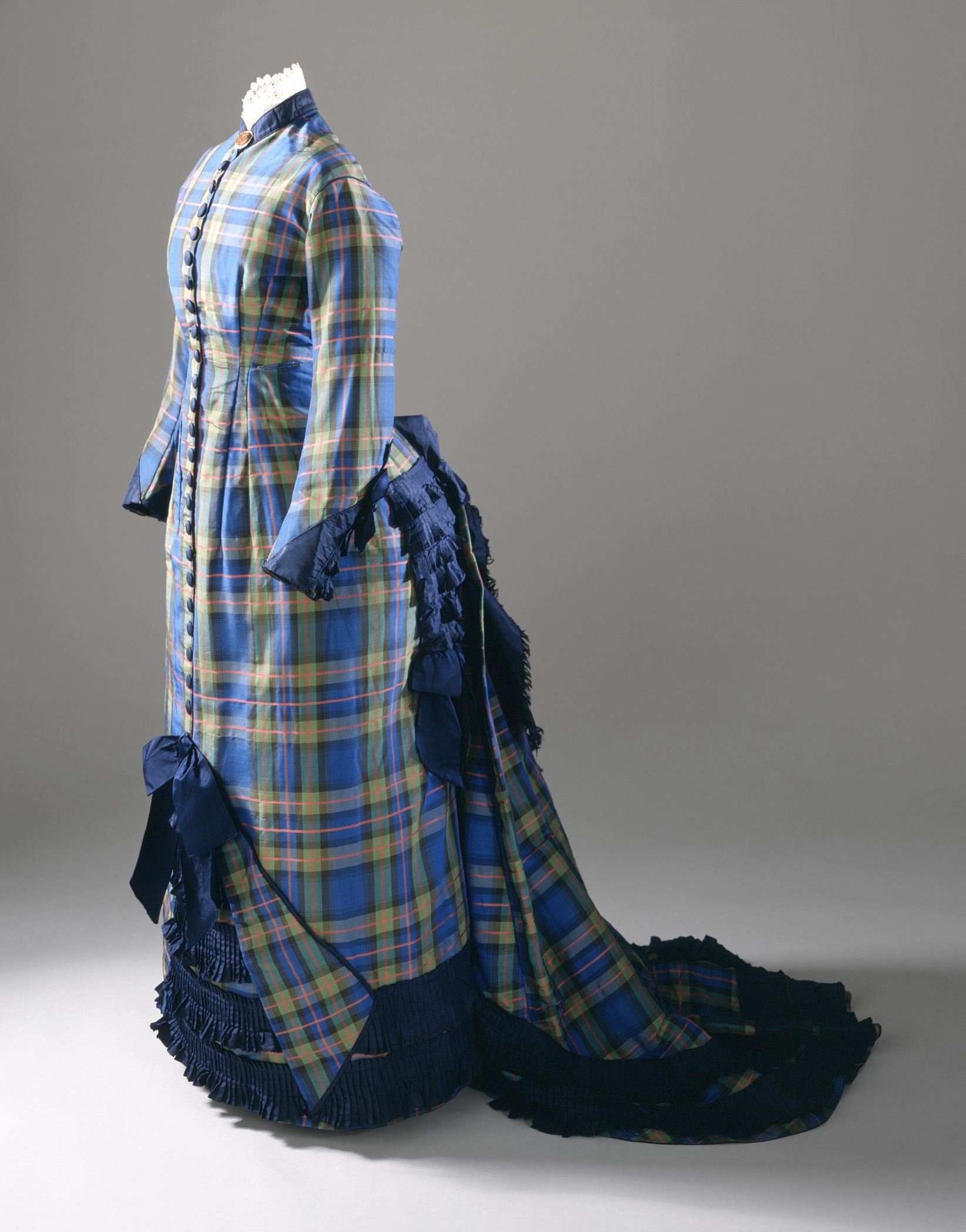
A silk and velvet late-Victorian young woman's tartan dress, 1878, probably made in England

Twenty years after her uncle's royal visit to Scotland, Victoria and her husband Prince Albert made their first trip to the Scottish Highlands in 1842; she was the first monarch to set foot in the Highlands since Mary, Queen of Scots, in the 16th century. The visit involved her large royal party being met with several theatrical tartan-kilted welcomes by Highland nobility and their retinues, with much sycophantic newspaper fanfare (while the common people were experiencing considerable misery); the Queen wrote: "It seemed as if a great chieftain in olden feudal times was receiving his sovereign". The monarch's early trips to Scotland were seen as a royal endorsement and had a transformative effect on the image of the country, as a now-loyal land of tartan, pipers, and kilted martial display.

Victoria and Albert leased Balmoral Castle, in Aberdeenshire, in 1848 (and bought it in 1852) as a private royal demesne and hired a local architect to re-model the estate in feudalised Scots baronial style, starting a "sham-castles" trend. Prince Albert personally took care of the interior design, where he made great use of tartan. He used the royal Stewart (red) and the hunting Stewart (green) tartans for carpets, while using the dress Stewart (red and white) for curtains and upholstery. Prince Albert (who often wore the kilt at Balmoral) is said to have created the Balmoral tartan, still used as a royal tartan today. They even decorated their carriage with tartan. Their adoption of a showy form of Highland dress inspired adoption by subject "who would have previously left Highland dress to the festivals of the Scots."

The royal couple spent a considerable amount of time at their Scottish estate (nearly 7 years in total), (Note: Queen Victoria wrote of her time in Scotland: "... I feel a sort of reverence in going over these scenes in this most beautiful country, which I am proud to call my own, where there was such devoted loyalty to the family of my ancestors – for Stuart blood is in my veins, and I am now their representative, and the people are as devoted and loyal to me as they were to that unhappy race".) and in doing so hosted "Highland" activities. Victoria was attended by pipers, and her children were attired in Highland dress. Prince Albert himself loved watching the Highland games and the pair became patrons of the Braemar Gathering. (Support from and attendance by various nobles may have helped preserve such events to the present, but it also "tartanised" them permanently, all the way into the 21st century.) The royal enthusiasm for and patronage of Highland things generated more early tourism to the Highlands, (Note: There were "tartanitis"-infused travel books of the era to go along with the tourism, e.g. A Tour in Tartan-land by Rev. Edward "Cuthbert Bede" Bradley (1863).) and a boost to business in the region as far as Perth and Edinburgh. It also spread tartan-wearing to other northern British lords and ladies, who began to invent complicated etiquette rules of dress for Highland garb, which had the effect of increasing the sense that it was upper-class attire. Adoption of tartan continued to spread into England; Thomas Osborne, Duke of Leeds, in West Yorkshire, devised a livery tartan for his men in 1848. Tartan, though a "pseudo-Caledonian masquerade", had become "the stuff of loyalty to the crown", with "a spurious royal and aristocratic cachet". This royal promotion was also noted abroad, with the effect that tartan became one of the widest-recognised cultural-identity symbols for the entire British country.

Despite their considerable devotion to charity (up to 20% of their Privy Purse income), Victoria and Albert, along with their friends in the northern gentry, have been accused of using their "Balmorality" – a term coined by George Scott-Moncrieff (1932) to refer to upper-class appropriation of Highland cultural trappings, marked by "hypocrisy" and "false sentiment" – to trivialise and even fictionalise history. According to Fiona K. Armstrong (2017), they engaged in long-term, tartan-blanketed escapism from the uncertainties of modernising, industrialised society and from pressing British societal problems, while worsening those problems in the actual Highlands. The queen's Balmoral residency also had another detrimental effect on the Scottish Highlands; inspired by her residency, aristocrats who lived outside the Highlands began purchasing estates in the region, resulting in land-ownership disparities that persist into the present day. The Highlands during Victoria's reign also became more accessible by road, rail, and boat.

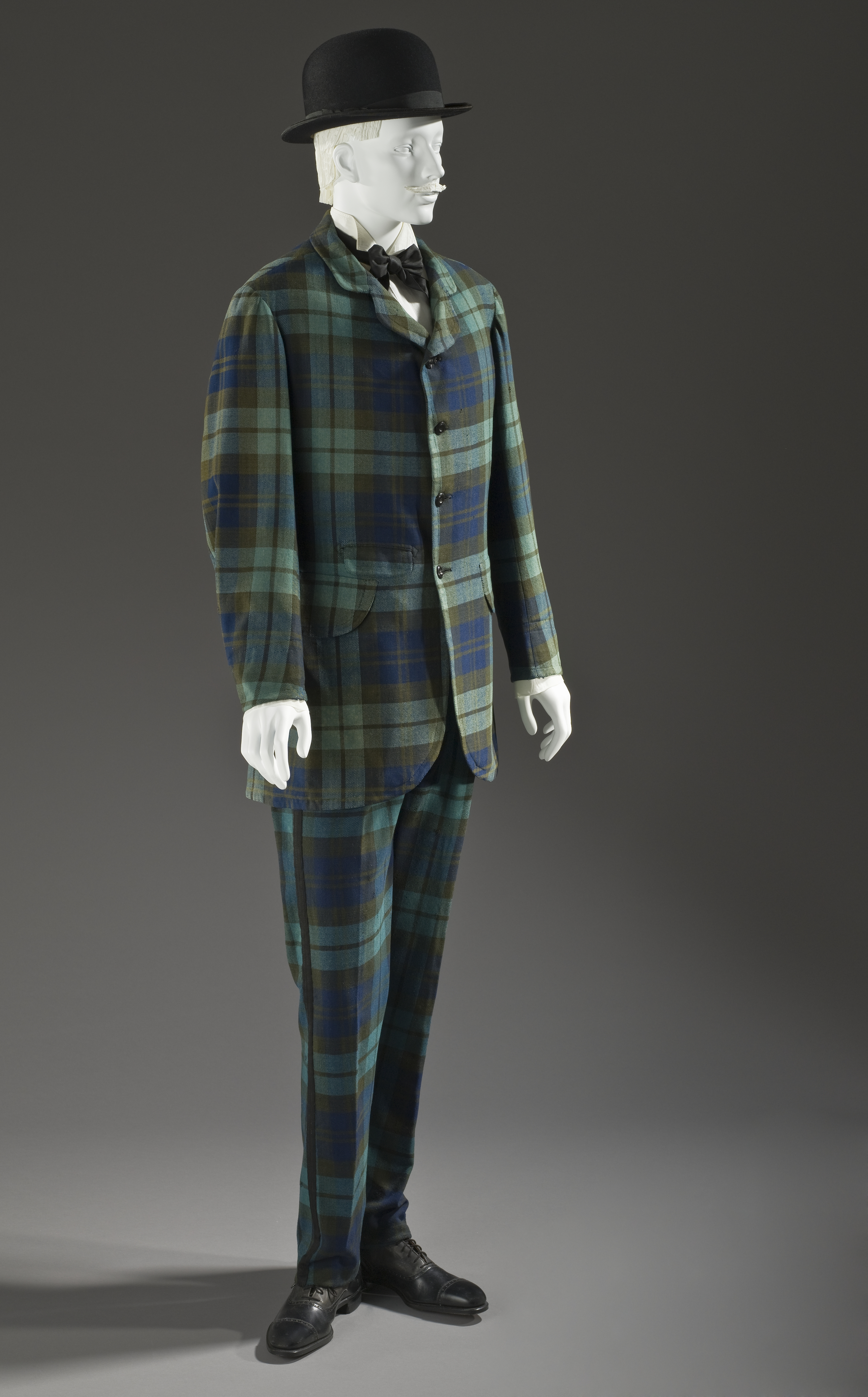
A late Victorian style, this two-piece tartan suit dates to about 1875–1880

As the tartan and "romantic Highlands" craze swept over Scotland, the real Highland population suffered grievously from the Hungry Forties as well as the Highland Clearances, when thousands of Gaelic-speaking Scots from the Highlands and Isles were evicted by landlords (often the very men who would have been their clan chiefs) to make way for sheep and for expansive deer-hunting preserves. Scots were also largely disenfranchised from voting, and the Highlands were running out of young men, in great regimental demand to fight and die in foreign wars for the empire, and many emigrating otherwise, with Victoria and Albert directly patronising emigration societies. Nearly 2 million Scots moved to non-European destinations during the Victorian era (more than half the native-born Scottish people of the period), and took a measure of Highlandism with them – "many of the generally understood images of the Highlands were held to be 'real' by people at the time". This would have strong tartan-promoting results among the Scottish diaspora later; Scarlett (1990) calls it a "tartan hunger that has been abroad from late Victorian times to the present day".

==== Ripple effects ====
Thomas Babington Macaulay wrote in 1848 of the romantic reinvention of Highland customs as somehow generally Scottish: "Soon the vulgar imagination was so completely occupied by plaids, targets, and claymores, that, by most Englishmen, Scotchman and Highlander were regarded as synonymous words." In 1849, Sir John Graham Dalyell asserted that "forty years ago no reputable gentleman would have appeared in a kilt in the streets of Edinburgh." Scott-Moncrieff (1932) likewise wrote of tartans being "misconceived" and worn all over Scotland (and even England) in the Victorian era as a part of the Queen's influence. Increasingly urban Scotland was putting on a "rural face" (a trend that would continue with "kailyard" literature). Tartanry and Highlandism were popular in part as a counter to a sense (especially among the aristocracy) that Scotland was losing its separate national identity in the Georgian to Victorian era, being ever more Anglicised as just "North Britain" amid empire-wide modernisation.

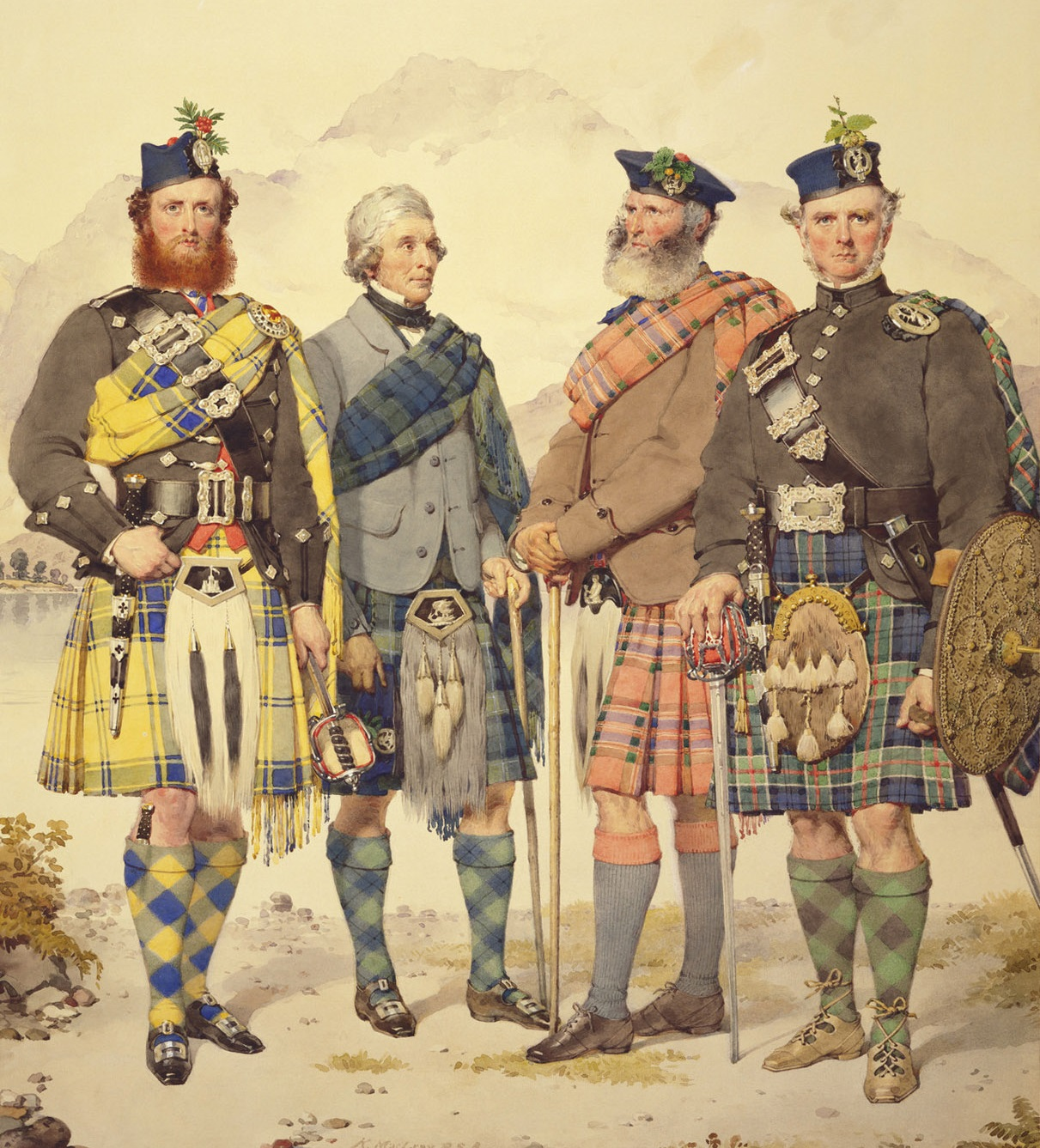
Kenneth MacLeay's 1866 portrait of a MacLachlan, a Graham, a MacFarlane, and a Colquhoun, for Victoria's Highlanders of Scotland book project.

In an 1849 letter to a publisher about a planned second edition of Vestiarium Scoticum, John Sobieski Stuart noted that tartan had become "extensively worn and manufactured" on the continent, as far away as France, Germany, Bohemia, and Hungary; he also expressed an interest in working directly with tartanware and tartan book makers W. & A. Smith of Mauchline. The same year, the Duke and Duchess of Atholl (whose entire estate was prescribed tartan livery) hosted a Highland-dress affair in London, the Royal Caledonian Ball, the first known charity ball (still a sold-out annual event today). The 1859 opening of the massive Loch Katrine waterworks (to pump fresh water to Glasgow, running out of well water) was attended by Queen Victoria, with the Atholl Highlanders (cannon in tow), the Celtic Society of Glasgow, and an honour-guard unit called the Glasgow Volunteers putting on a tartan- and piper-laden display for the newspapers; it was a confluence of modern engineering and romantic–patriotic tartanry. When the Prince Consort died in 1861, Victoria commissioned a tartan-kilted statue of Albert at Balmoral by William Theed.

According to Jonathan Faiers (2008), Victoria had actually intentionally made tartan more popular for the benefit of the British textile industry. By the 1860s, tartan was not only as popular in London as in Scotland, leading weaver Wilsons of Bannockburn produced £80,000 of product per year, and employed 500–600 people. (It amalgamated with another of the family businesses, a carpet-weaving operation, in 1867, which continued to 1924.) Around 1860, new synthetic aniline dyes allowed for production of tartans in vivid colours at more affordable prices, and their lower cost translated into more consumption of tartan by the middle class.

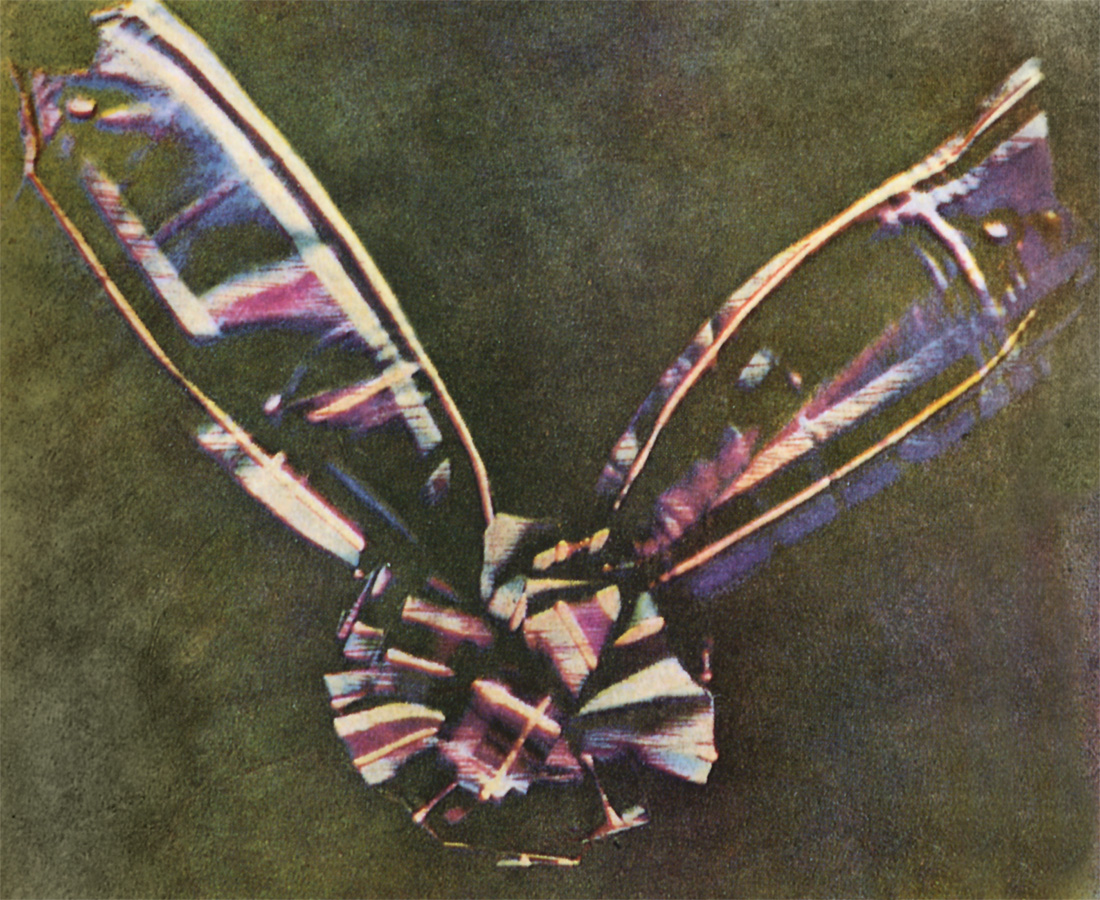
The first permanent colour photograph, by Thomas Sutton in 1861, was of a tartan ribbon

As modernisation marched on, the world's first permanent colour photograph, taken by Thomas Sutton (using the three-colour process developed by Scottish physicist James Clerk Maxwell) in 1861, was of a tartan ribbon. It was created by using red, blue, and yellow filters to create three photographs which were then combined into a composite. R. Martin (1988) notes that there was a confluence of unrelated technological "junctions and serendipities" in the mid-19th century that together broadly promoted tartan, including photography, consistently bright and more economical artificial dyes, affordable colour book printing, mass-production of soft but durable fine textiles, and applicability of printed patterns to middle-class products like tartanware – all "far-removed from the true peasant history of tartan." Ian Brown (2012), a professor with a focus on Scottish literature and culture, has written that while George IV and Victoria (not to mention business interests in their wake, like the Wilsons of Bannockburn and the Smiths of Mauchline) seemed to have been "the winner taking over the loser's tokens", the renewed public interest in tartan within and beyond Scotland was not entirely owing to them, especially given the international interest in Highland-romantic works of Walter Scott and "Ossian". The acceptance of and even enthusiasm for tartan among the post-proscription upper class can be seen as a necessary attempt at reconciliation within a culturally diverse country, and the influence ran both ways, with old Scottish nationalism transmuting into a new unionism that demanded recognition of Scottish interests and institutions. "In short, it is an open question whether George IV in a kilt and Victoria and Albert at Balmoral are appropriating and subverting a set of values, or whether they are being appropriated and subverted." Even the 1822 "King's Jaunt" had been stage-managed by two Scots with a keen interest in romanticising and promoting Gaelic and broader Scottish culture (historico-traditional accuracy notwithstanding), and the Atholls' deep and tartan-arrayed involvement in Victoria's activities in the north can be viewed in the same light. Both George IV and Victoria, primarily of German House of Hanover stock, came to identify strongly with their quite thin Scottish House of Stuart genealogy.

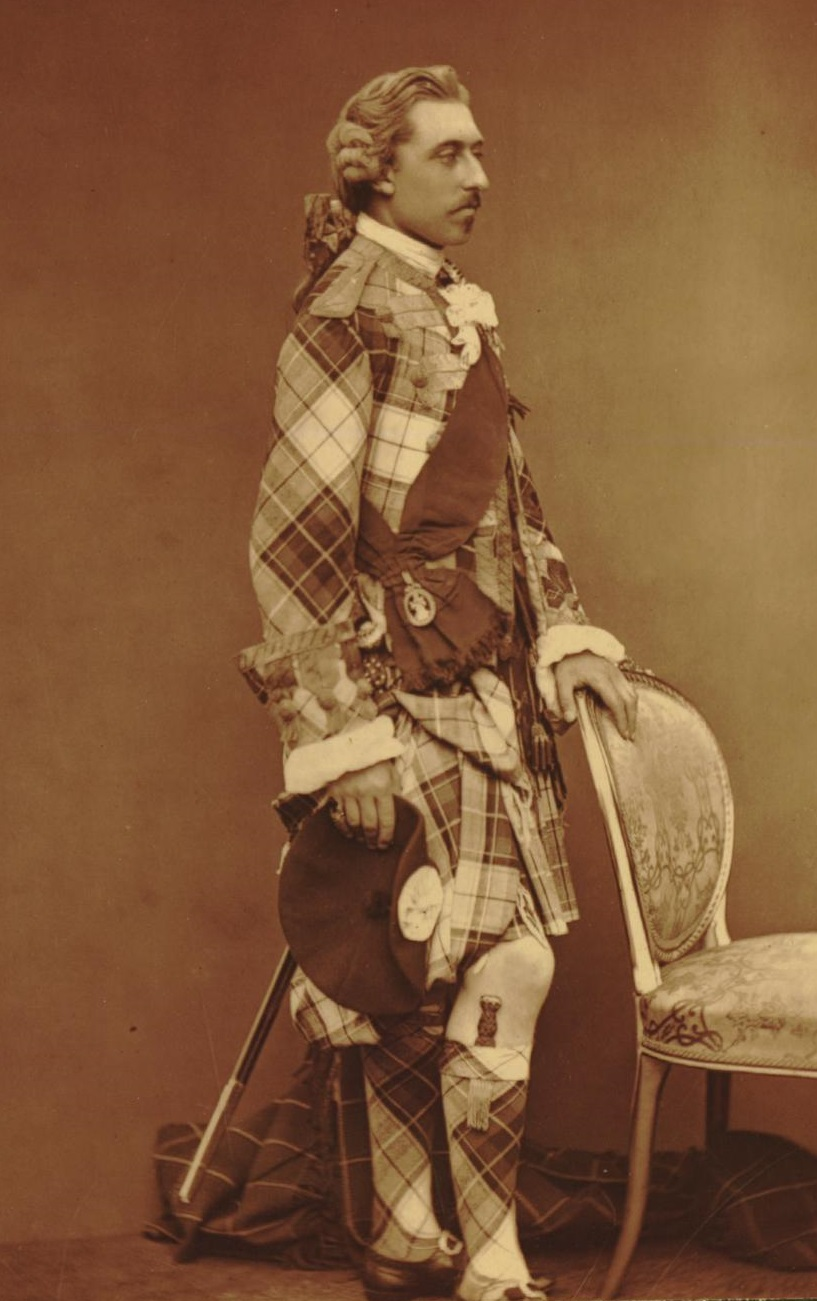
Prince Arthur dressed up as Bonnie Prince Charlie for the 1871 Waverley Ball

The 1864 funeral of the Sixth Duke of Atholl was another anachronistically feudal, tartan-and-pipers pageant. In 1866–1870, Victoria and the Duchess of Atholl commissioned artist Kenneth MacLeay in Edinburgh to produce a series of watercolours of statuesque men in tartan Highland gear, representing common people from ghillies to shepherds and fishermen, "as they now are". Prints were published in 1870 as Highlanders of Scotland: Portraits Illustrative of the Principal Clans and Followings, and the Retainers of the Royal Household at Balmoral, with text by Amelia (Emily) Murray MacGregor, an attendant of Victoria as well as a Clan Gregor historian and the first female Gaelic lecturer. A tartanistical fantasy, as well as another exercise in "Highlander as noble savage", the art book necessitated canvassing Scottish aristocrats for outfits and suitable models ("specimens"), as the everyday people did not look the hyper-masculine part, were not able to afford such Highland-dress extravagances as were to be illustrated, and were more likely to be wearing trousers than kilts. The resulting book is the most detailed record of the "proper", codified Victorian-era Highland dress and accessories, which "removed tartan from its blustery nonchalance to an ordered set of adornments" – most of which survive to the present, Highland dress being remarkably resistant to further major stylistic changes, Victorian styles having become "traditional". Tartan had also become more established throughout the 1850s and 1860s as a textile for European-fashionable rather than Highland women's clothing, from bodices and dresses to sashes and shawls (the never-extinguished ladies' plaids). The tartan sash in particular was a favourite of the Queen, and remains a common womenswear option, worn several different ways in modern Highland dress, though it has little to do with original Highland clothing before the 19th century; it is an adaptation of the plaid to a style of the European nobility.

In 1871, at the Waverley Ball, a fancy dress affair in London, the Prince of Wales (the future King Edward VII) and his brother Prince Arthur, long accustomed to Highland dress, arrived tartaned out as an old-time Lord of the Isles and as Bonnie Prince Charlie, respectively. In 1872, ethnologist Jacob Falke wrote that "In Scotland indeed the plaid has still some importance, but it is an object of manufacture, and ... its motives have long ago become the common property of fashion, and indeed have become so permeated by it that what is genuine and old in it is scarcely to be recognised". Since its 1880 re-opening, the Gaelic Society of Perth in the Lowlands held festivities that involved much piping and tartan-wear, into the early 20th century, despite the language-preservation organisation having nothing to do with Highland dress or pibroch; being swathed in tartan had somehow become vital to such events. By 1883, Highland dress as proper courtly attire had become highly regulated, aristocratic, and formal, but "inclusive" in one sense – the tartan-wear was permitted at court for essentially anyone claiming Highland origins or land-ownership (even if natively English), not just the gentles of the well-established clans.

In the Victorian era, tartan garments for women as well as men continued to be featured in fashion catalogues, in styles not derived from Highland costume, such as everyday suits and dresses. Tartan had also become popular for children's clothing in continental Europe, inspired by the royal children of Victoria. In the United States, tartan was similarly worked into school uniforms, especially at Catholic schools. The late 19th century saw tartan (sometimes in silk) in fashion throughout Europe, including in France (e.g. Paris, Lyon, and Alsace) and Italy, and as far from Britain as Russia. Founded in 1898, Walker's Shortbread has long been sold in royal Stewart tartan packaging around the world (especially for Christmas and Hogmanay).

=== 20th century to present ===
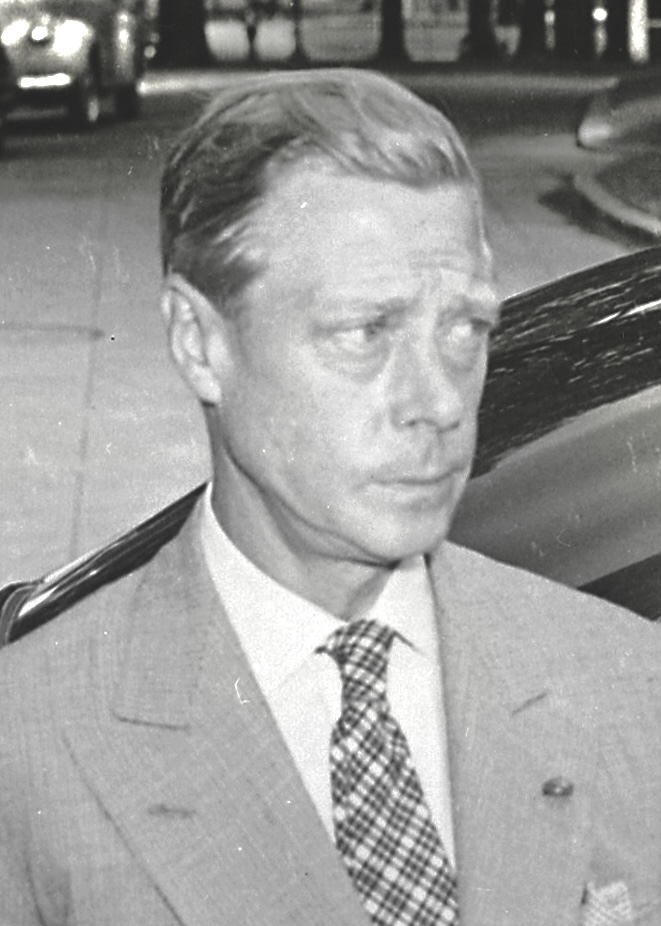
Edward, Duke of Windsor, in a tartan necktie, 1945

In the Edwardian era, tartan had become less a component of men's clothing (with the decline in kilt-wearing) but more an important part of women's fashion, including fanciful haute couture designs from Paris that had no connection to Highland style, and many accessories such as petticoats, stockings, and blouses; masculine accessories included braces (suspenders), neckties, cummerbunds, and socks.

Edward VII himself had grown up wearing Highland dress frequently. There was also in this period into the 1920s a market for Highland-dress etiquette booklets, which tied into the era's "dress sense" of decorum and class. Because of its associations with the British aristocracy, Scottish clans, and Highland military, tartan had developed an air of dignity and exclusivity. Because of this, tartan was to make periodic resurgences in the world of fashion. The tartan uniforms of the Scottish Regiments were an important recruiting tool during World War I; as Archibald Primrose, Lord Rosebery, put it: "there is nothing so magnificent in our army as the swing of a kilted regiment". Tartan's Georgian re-orientation as a symbol representing unionism and empire continued well into the first half of the 20th century, though outright tartanry and Highlandism on the part of the upper class waned, especially after about 1920. Nevertheless, Edward VIII, later Duke of Windsor, was a life-long devotee of tartan, often wearing more than one at a time.

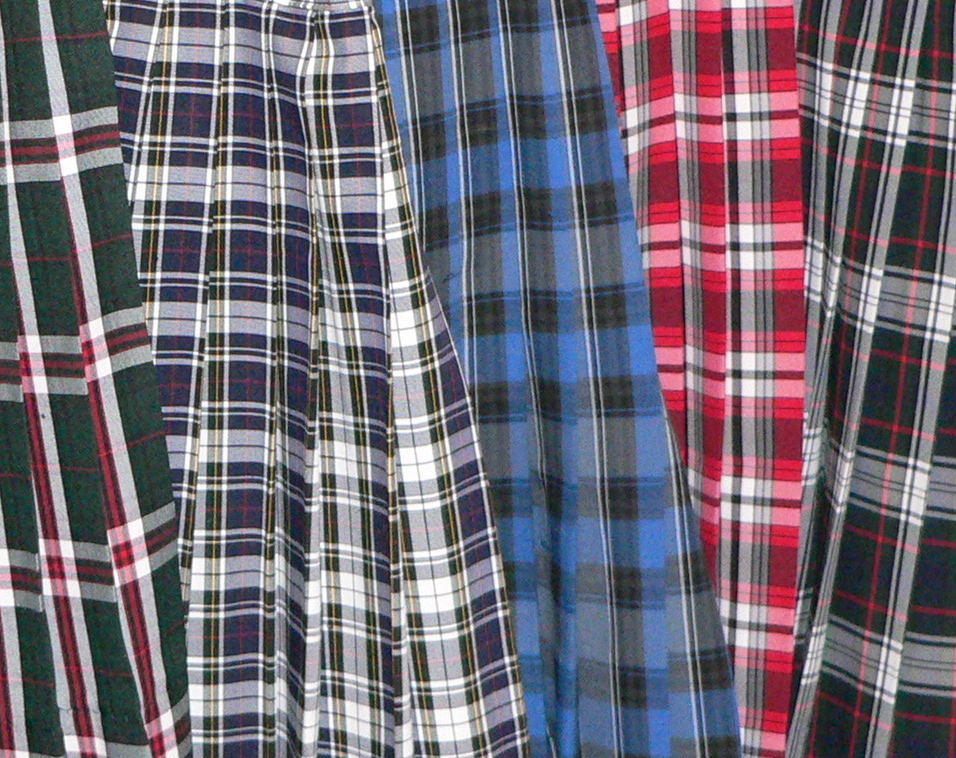
Catholic school uniform skirts, using a wide variety of tartans

Tartan patterns (often simple, unnamed ones) remained commonly used for skirts and pinafore dresses (jumper dresses) in Catholic and other private school uniform codes in North America and also in public and private schools in New Zealand. The style spread to many other places, including South America, Japan (which sometimes imports tartan directly from Scotland), and Hong Kong.

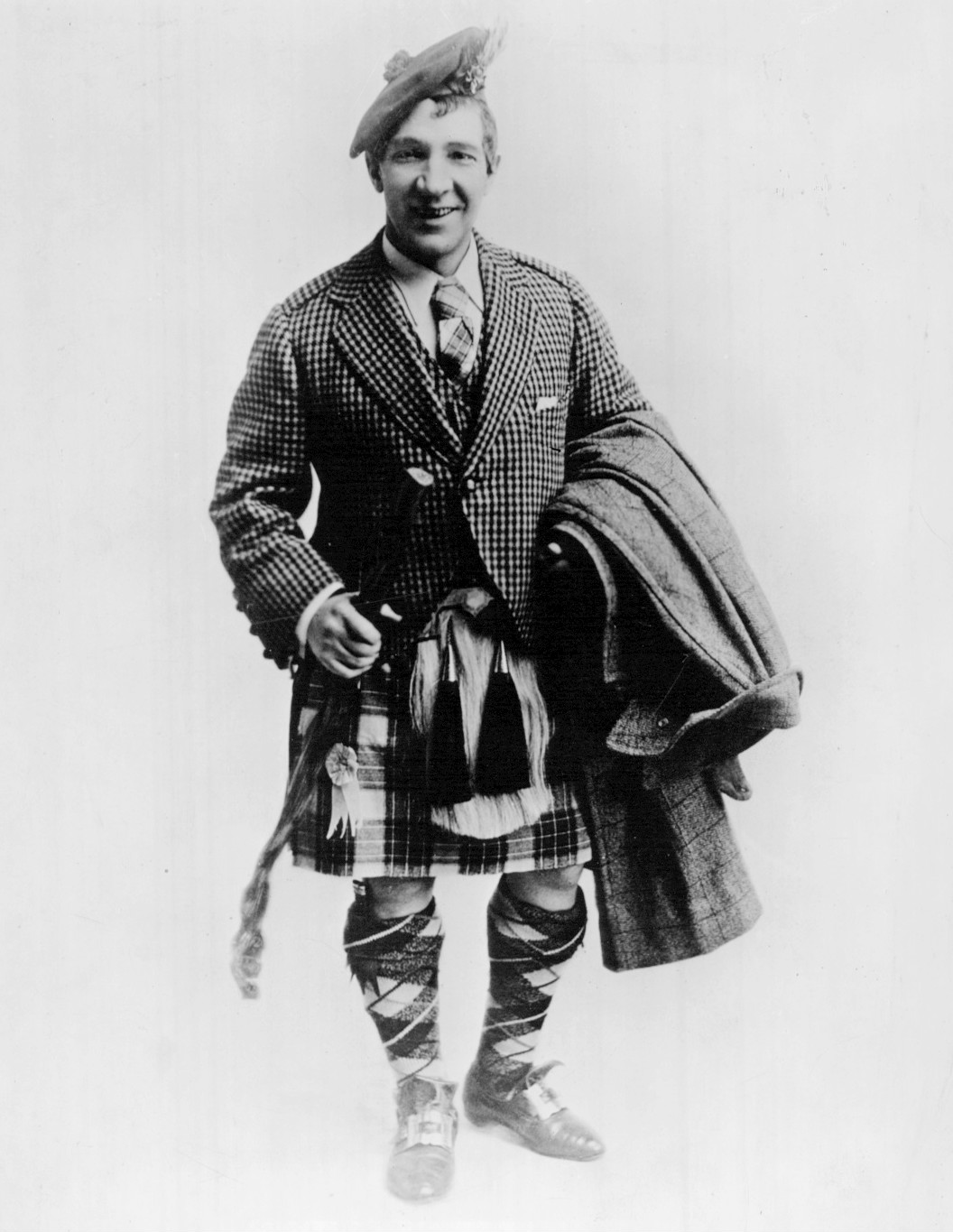
Harry Lauder in one of his Highland outfits, 1922

Harry Lauder (properly Sir Henry – he was knighted for his war-effort fundraising during World War I) became world-famous in the 1910s and 1920s, on a dance hall and vaudeville entertainment platform of tartan Highland dress, a thick Scots accent, and folksy songs about an idealised, rural Scotland, like his hit "Roamin' in the Gloamin'". At one point, he was the highest-paid performer in the world, and toured the United States, Australia, South Africa, and of course the UK to sold-out audiences. A Lowlander himself, Lauder has been credited with (and blamed for) keeping alive a tartanry-and-Highlandism image of Scotland, with critics calling him a "kilted clown" who promoted the idea of Scotsmen "clothed like the chieftain of Clan McCrazy".

==== Diaspora and globalisation ====
By the mid-20th century, annual Highland games events, modelled on the traditional events in Scotland, had been established not just in Scotland but throughout the United States, Canada, Australia, New Zealand, and South Africa, among other places with a notable Scottish diaspora, which totals about 50 million people worldwide. There are dozens of such events in Scotland, and at least 260 annual Highland games events worldwide as of 2000, more than 100 of them in the US alone, and dozens more in Canada. They are closely intertwined with bagpipe band competitions (which date to 1781), a lasting source of tartan imagery in their regiment-inspired Highland uniforms.

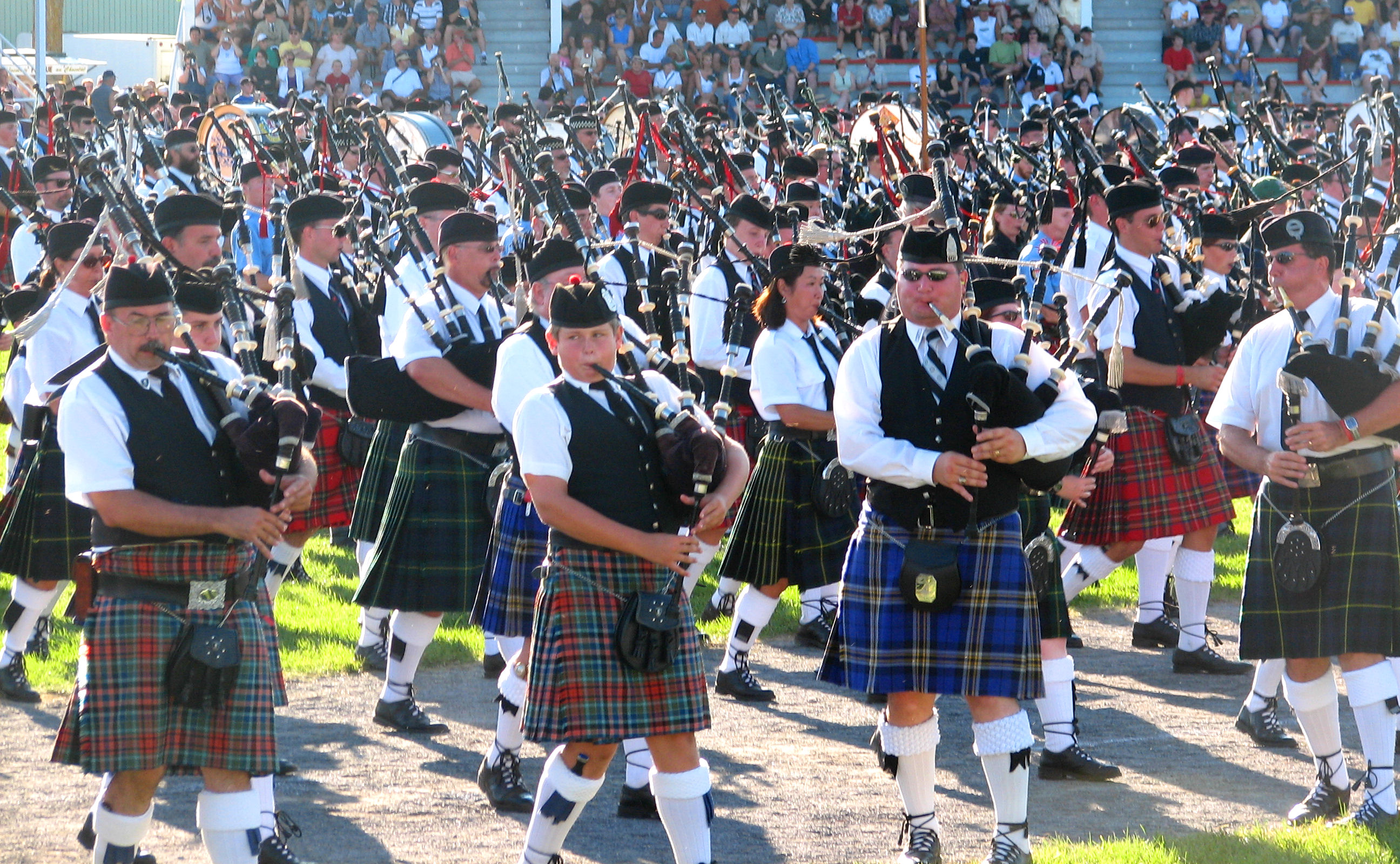
Massed bands at the Glengarry Highland Games, Maxville, Ontario, Canada, 2006

The games' rather elaborately tartaned subculture is sustained outside Scotland primarily by multi-generational Scottish descendants rather than by direct Scottish expatriates.

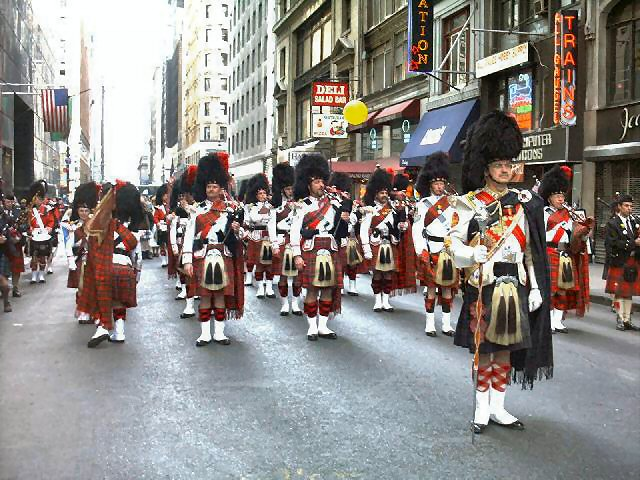
Mystic Highland Pipe Band at Tartan Day parade, New York City, 2002

Tartan Day, an annual symbolic ethnicity holiday among the Scottish diaspora, is a growing affair celebrated on 6 April, the date on which the Declaration of Arbroath was signed in 1320. Tartan Day was first declared in Nova Scotia in 1987, and was essentially nation-wide in Canada by the 1990s. It has since spread to Australia (with varying levels of official recognition, 1989–1996), the US (1998), and other places including New Zealand, and even Argentina and Paris, France. In New York City, it has turned into an entire Tartan Week since 1999, with honorary "grand marshals" that are usually Scottish celebrities.

The term tartanism (as distinct from tartanry) has been coined by Ian Brown (2012) for this international tokenisation of tartan as an ethnic-identity symbol, evolving to some degree independently to suit diasporic cultural needs and unrestrained by the views of the originating Scottish "home" culture. According to Ian Maitland Hume (2001), tartan and the kilt are powerful symbols that "encapsulate many facets of a heritage which people aspire to access ... a part-mythical family origin for those seeking roots".

The Scottish Tartans Museum and Heritage Center was opened by the Scottish Tartans Society in 1988 in Highlands, North Carolina; in 1994, it moved to nearby Franklin. The museum, which runs independently of STS, features over 600 tartans on display, including specimens dating to c. 1725, and Highland dress examples to ca. 1800. (STS also operated a Scottish Tartans Museum in Edinburgh, but it closed when STS did in 2000.) A major exhibition on tartan was produced by the Fashion Institute of Technology in New York 1988–89, and another was created for the Edinburgh Festival in 1989. Others followed in Italy in 2003, and Japan in 2018. In April 2023, the Victoria and Albert Museum of Dundee (V&A Dundee) opened a design exhibit (running until January 2024) about tartan and its "shifting context", with goals of "challenging preconceptions of what tartan is, whether that be from a historical sense or fashion sense".

D. Gordon Teall of Teallach, of the Scottish Tartans Society, observed in 1994:

Tartans have always formed part of Scotland's historic heritage and it is a compliment to their country that they have become so widespread throughout the English and Gaelic speaking world. They are probably more popular now than they have ever been because they have come to symbolise the spirit of families, clans and districts and, more recently, corporate institutions.

Even as tartan has been bent to the cultural needs of the diaspora, as "the most straightforward and outward sign of ... affinity with Scottishness", and bent to the commercial intents of fashion, tourism, entertainment, and other industries, tartan's reception by native Scots in Scotland has been less favourable for decades, even the last century or so. Reasons include a feeling that it is not really a symbol of broad Scottish national identity because of its specifically Gaelic and Highland origin; the "Highlandist" and imperialist foisting of it on the entire country as national costume in the late Georgian through Victorian eras; distorted views of Scottish people promulgated by Lauder and other tartaned entertainers of a century ago; an academic view of tartary and Lowland kailyard literature as two halves of a low-brow, romanticising vulgarity (reinforced in recent decades by the "Tartan Army" fandom of the Scotland national football team reinvigorating a working-class attachment to kilts and tartan); and historically inaccurate portrayal of Scotland by tartan-heavy Hollywood productions like Brigadoon (1954) and Braveheart (1995). Brancaz (2016) argues that "looking at tartan through the lens of the intelligentsia fails to account for its enduring appeal and resilience. ... [T]he wearing of kilts and tartans at weddings, funerals, and cèilidhs in Scotland has increasingly been interpreted as a form of cultural reappropriation."

==== Industry and politics ====
In 2006, the British Ministry of Defence sparked controversy when it allowed foreign woollen mills to bid for the government contracts to provide the tartans used by the Scottish troops (newly amalgamated as battalions into the Royal Regiment of Scotland), and lowered the formerly very high standards for the cloth.

Following a bill submitted in the Scottish Parliament in February 2007, Scotland's enterprise minister announced in July 2007 that the National Archives of Scotland would set up a national register of tartans. The announcement stated that "Tartan's importance to Scotland cannot be overestimated. It is deeply embedded in Scottish culture and is an internationally recognised symbol of Scotland." This was later reiterated in 2013 through the BBC. The ministry cited an industry report indicating that "the tartan industry is a significant contributor to the overall Scottish economy; and larger ... than suggested by previous industry estimates", and is the basis for some 200 businesses, 4,000 jobs, and £350 million in annual GDP in Scotland. The bill passed in October 2008, and the Scottish Register of Tartans launched in February 2009.

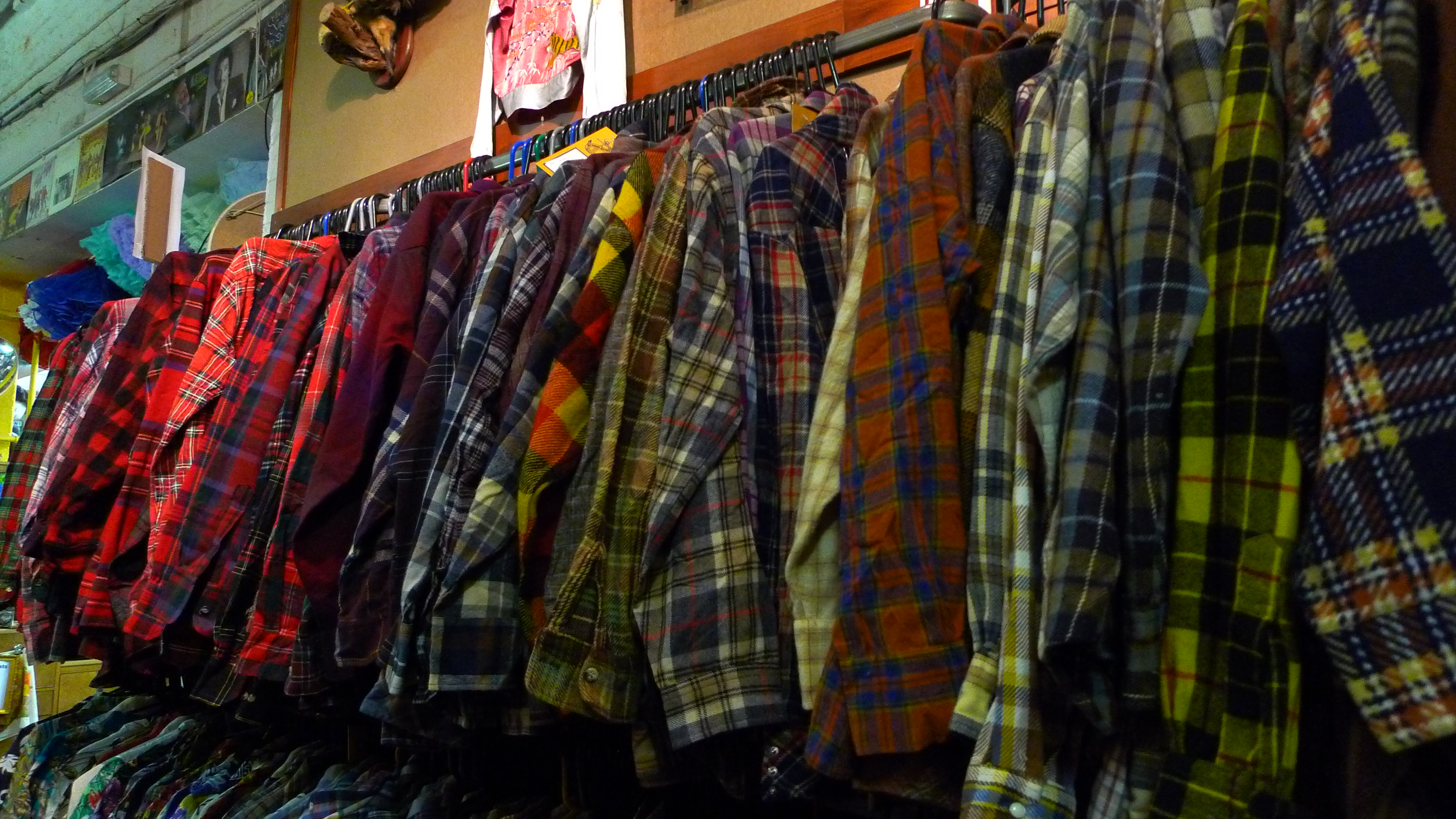
General tartan-pattern clothing shot up in popularity again starting around 2010

The Observer reported in 2010 that tartan clothing had become more popular than ever before, crossing subcultural, social-class, and age-group lines, and showing in that year a 540% sales increase in Britain from only two years earlier. Around the same time, there began a resurgence in tartan kilt wearing among Scottish young people "as a mark of a vibrant, modern Scotland". This has interrupted a generations-long trend of native Scottish disaffection toward tartan as stereotyping kitsch. An online survey by BBC in 2012 found that 52% of respondents strongly or very strongly disagreed with the premise "Walter Scott's re-branding of all Scots as tartan-wearing Highlanders has been a hindrance to Scotland's cultural development", and only a third agreed. Tartan in mainstream, international fashion experienced another resurgence starting in 2019.

Contemporary Scottish nationalism has been said to be "fed, in part, by tartan and Jacobite nostalgia". After avoidance of tartan since the 1970s (especially by Scottish liberals), the cloth has been politicised again as a nationalist symbol (as it was in the early 18th century), especially during the 2014 Scottish independence referendum and in the Scottish National Party's 2015 campaign. (Perhaps owing to this messaging shift, the VisitScotland agency around the same time changed its tourism advertising to minimise, though not eliminate, tartan imagery.) Murray Pittock (2002) writes that the neo-Jacobitism is "both irritating kitsch and a language of identity" for modern Scots. After several decades of intellectual hostility toward tartan (e.g. in Tom Nairn's 1977 The Break-up of Britain: Crisis and Neo-nationalism, and Hugh Trevor-Roper's posthumous 2008 The Invention of Scotland), an "academic re-assessment of tartan" began in the early 21st century, relying on a wider range of early and modern source material, in historiographical, multidisciplinary edited volumes including Scottish History: The Power of the Past (eds. Edward J. Cowan and Richard J. Finlay, 2002) and From Tartan to Tartany (ed. Ian Brown, 2010).

Major commercial weavers (tartan mills) of traditional tartan cloth that are operating today include Lochcarron of Scotland in Lochcarron and Selkirk; Ingles Buchan in Glasgow; House of Edgar (also a Highland dress vendor, and a subsidiary of Macnaughton Holdings) in Perth; Johnstons of Elgin (also a wool clothing maker), Strathmore Woollen in Forfar, and D. C. Dalgliesh in Selkirk, all three of which are now part of the Edinburgh-based Scotweb, under the trade name Clan; Prickly Thistle (also a women's clothing maker) in Evanton and Edinburgh; The Tartan Weaving Mill (also a weaving museum, and a subsidiary of Gold Brothers) in Edinburgh; Andrew Elliot Ltd in Selkirk; Stevens & Graham (specialising mostly in tartan rugs and carpet) in Rutherglen; Marton Mills in West Yorkshire, England; Cambrian Woollen Mill, in Powys, Wales; West Coast Woollen Mills in Vancouver, British Columbia, Canada; GK Textiles in Port Moody, BC (formerly Fraser & Kirkbright, Vancouver); and Pendleton Woolen Mills in Portland, Oregon, US. The modern trade in wool tartan fabric has three principal markets: Highland dress, high fashion (with significant business from France and Italy), and furnishing.

Popular tartans (including for kilts and other Highland dress, as well as for school uniforms) have increasingly been manufactured, primarily in the UK, in poly-viscose (PV), a blend of the artificial materials polyester and viscose (rayon), typically in a 65% polyester to 35% viscose ratio. PV is promoted as washable, durable, crease-resistant but heat-settable for permanent pleating, shrinkage-resistant, stain-resistant, colour-fast, low-pilling, hypoallergenic, not attractive to clothes moths, more "breatheable" than polyester (thus good for athletics), lower cost than wool, and lighter weight than wool, but said to have a wool-like texture. It also does not rely on animal industry, so it appeals to vegans. Large-scale global manufacturers of tartan-patterned cloth in a variety of cotton, polyester, viscose, nylon, etc., materials and blends include Başkan Tekstil in Istanbul and Bursa, Turkey; and Jeen Wei Enterprises in Taichung, Taiwan; while a leading maker of tartan ribbon is Satab in Saint-Just-Malmont, France. Tartan designs have long been produced in low-cost cotton in large quantities in China.

Carol Craig (2003) writes: "Like it or not, tartan is a very sophisticated branding and marketing tool for Scotland." In a tartan-as-marketing analysis, Paterson (2001) observed that continued internationalisation of tartan manufacture, design, and consumption has diluted the associative "Scottishness" of tartan and its value as a national identifier. He blames this in part on Scottish weavers' failure to adapt to market demands for a wider range of fabric applications, as well as the businesses' own complicity in broadening tartan's perceived cultural identity, e.g. in creating tartans for non-Scottish families, places, and organisations.

==== In popular culture ====
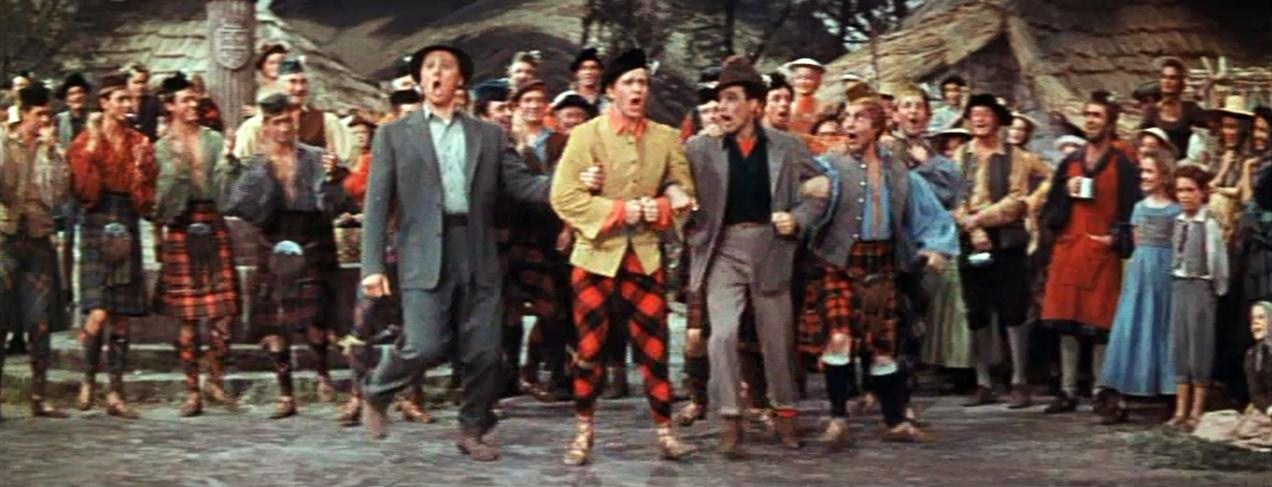
Scene from 1954 Brigadoon film, with kilts and tartan trews

In 1947, the tartan-laden Broadway musical Brigadoon (followed by a film version in 1954 and a television adaptation in 1966) renewed an excessively romanticised notion of the Highlands and Highland dress. A critical review called it a "whimsical dream-world" that was "overloaded with Hollywood-Scottish trappings". (The production is generally not well received by actual Scots.)

Tartan suits were popular in the mod subculture of Great Britain of the early to mid-1960s and its late 1970s revival.

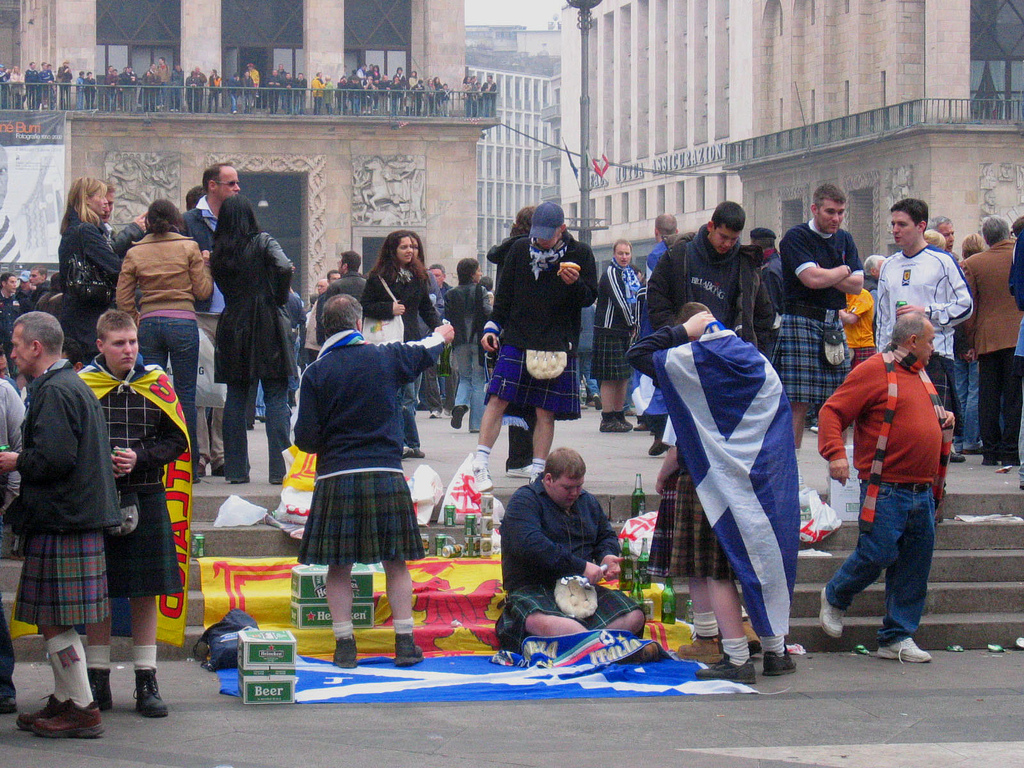
"Tartan Army" Scottish football fans at a match in Milan, Italy, in 2005

Since the 1970s, the fandom of the Scotland men's national football (soccer) team have been collectively referred to by the nickname "Tartan Army", with fans often sporting tartan clothing (including kilts) at matches.

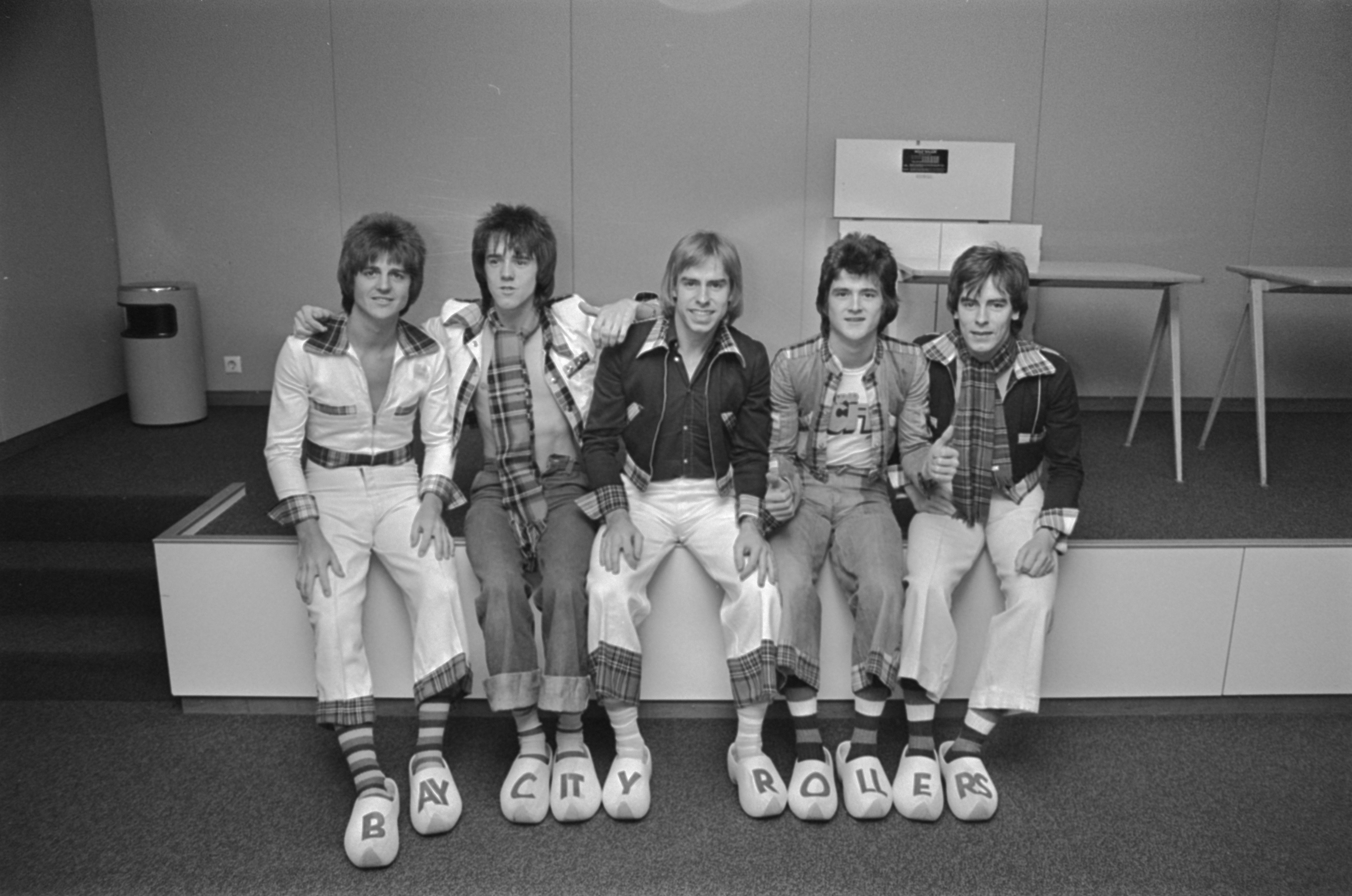
The Bay City Rollers in the Netherlands in 1976, sporting some tartan shirts and a tartan-trimmed jacket

Popular in the mid-1970s, Scottish teeny-bopper band the Bay City Rollers were described by the British Hit Singles & Albums reference book as "tartan teen sensations from Edinburgh".

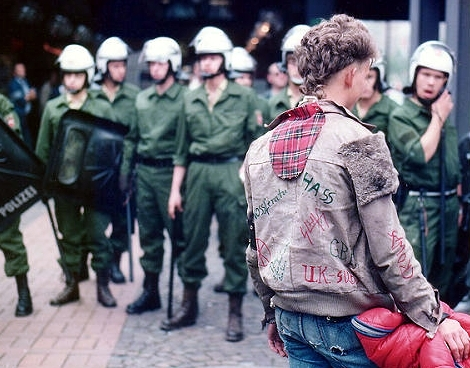
A German punk wearing a piece of the royal Stewart tartan, 1984

Tartan became a common element of punk subculture starting in the late 1970s. Punk music was a way for youth in the British Isles to voice their discontent with the ruling class and with modern society. The unorthodox use of tartan (especially the royal Stewart), which had long been associated with authority and gentility, was then seen as an expression of that discontent. In this way, tartan – worn unconventionally – became an anti-establishment symbol. This was entirely on purpose according to Vivienne Westwood, a designer deeply involved in early punk fashion; the idea was "to seize the very fabric of the Establishment in order to reverse its meaning and perhaps to challenge society's design." American punks often wore tartan skirts, a "subversion" of the Catholic school-girl uniform, and kilts have also been worn in the punk scene since the late 1970s, especially in the UK. Baggy tartan pants later proved popular among pop-punks and skate punks, and tartan-lined jackets among ska punks. From the late 1990s, kilts (mostly modernised "utility kilts" but sometimes traditional ones) have become relatively popular even in North American post-punk subculture (e.g. the goth–industrial, emo, and steampunk scenes), though often in black rather than tartan.

After the 1970s, Westwood, who continued to work extenstively with tartan, was joined by other big-name couturiers. These included Ralph Lauren and Laura Ashley, whose designs promoted tartan as a mainstream modern clothing option "with traditional grace and style" for both women and men; Stephen Sprouse, credited with a 1980s combination of "uptown sophistication in clothing with a downtown punk and pop sensibility"; and later Alexander McQueen, who was "consciously repoliticising the cloth". Others have included Jean Paul Gaultier, Tommy Hilfiger (who made tartan central to his fall 2000 collection), Christian Lacroix, Yves Saint Laurent, Giorgio Armani, and Gianfranco Ferré. A tartan outfit designed by Westwood featured on a commemorative UK postage stamp issued by the Royal Mail in 2012 celebrating "Great British Fashion".

Tartan/plaid flannel shirts, emblematic of the working class, re-entered mainstream fashion through a series of subcultural adoptions, originating primarily in the western United States. First, the style became a staple of cholo style in and around Los Angeles, from the 1970s. From there, the style later became adopted by hip hop fashion in the 1990s, especially the West Coast hip hop lifestyle. Tartan flannel shirts also became quintessentially part of (and androgynous within) the grunge scene (starting in Seattle) of the late 1980s to 2000s. There was fashion cross-pollination between these youth-culture movements, and the fashion industry has found this confluence very marketable.

A resurgence of interest in tartan and kilts (and even Scottish tourism) has been generated in recent times by major Hollywood productions like the Highlander franchise (1986–2007), Four Weddings and a Funeral (1994), Braveheart (1995), Rob Roy (1995), Brave (2012), and the television series Outlander (2014–, with a follow-on travelogue documentary series, Men in Kilts). Many of these featured custom-designed tartans.

Tartan clothing has appeared frequently in Doctor Who. The Fourth Doctor (Tom Baker) wore a Wallace tartan scarf on Terror of the Zygons, and his robot-dog companion K9 had a tartan collar. The Sixth Doctor (Colin Baker) had a signature patchwork frock coat that included segments in three different tartans, and also typically wore a tartan waistcoat in a fourth sett under it. The Seventh Doctor (Sylvester McCoy) wore a crimson and black tartan scarf on Time and the Rani. Clara Oswald (Jenna Coleman), the companion of the Eleventh Doctor (Matt Smith) and the Twelfth Doctor (Peter Capaldi), wore a Campbell tartan dress on "The Name of the Doctor" and a Wallace skirt on "The Time of the Doctor" and "Deep Breath". Annabel Scholey as Claire Brown, in the Thirteenth Doctor (Jodie Whittaker) serial Flux, wears a 1960s-style muted tartan dress. The Fourteenth Doctor (David Tennant) wore a brown tartan suit in the 60th anniversary specials.

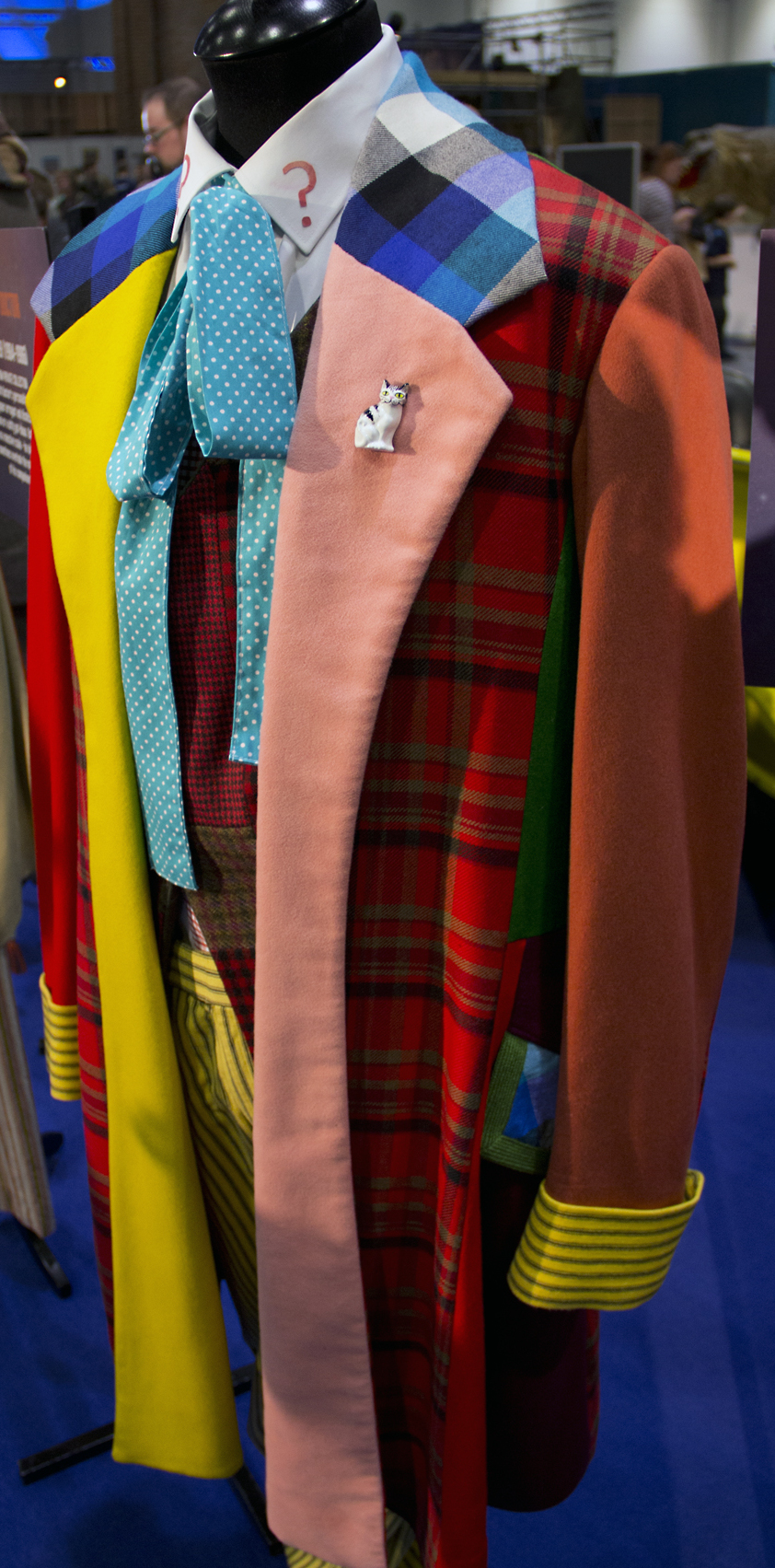
1980s Doctor Who patchwork costume of the Sixth Doctor, with at least three tartans involved

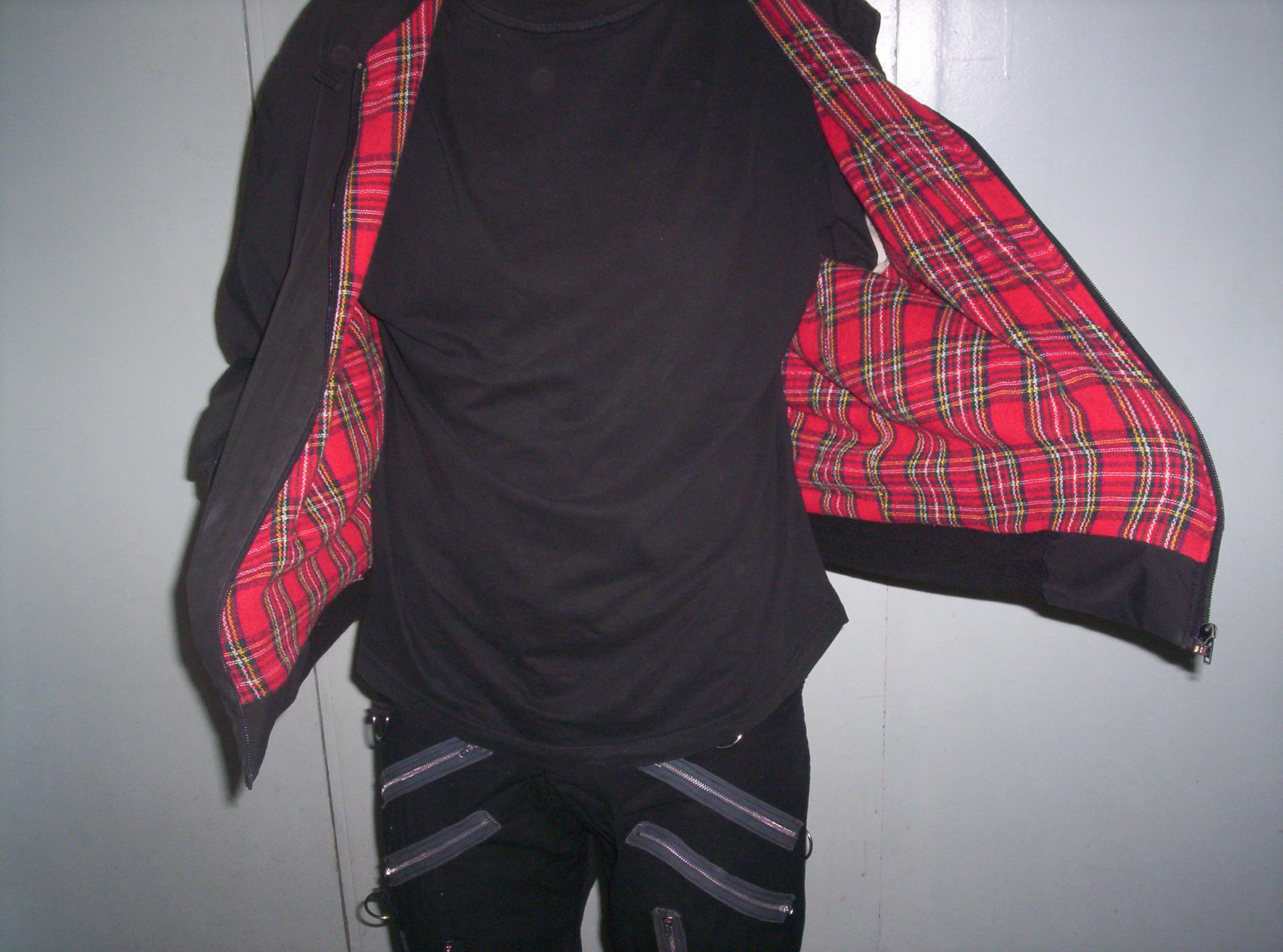
Royal Stewart again, as a mod/ska-punk jacket lining, 2007

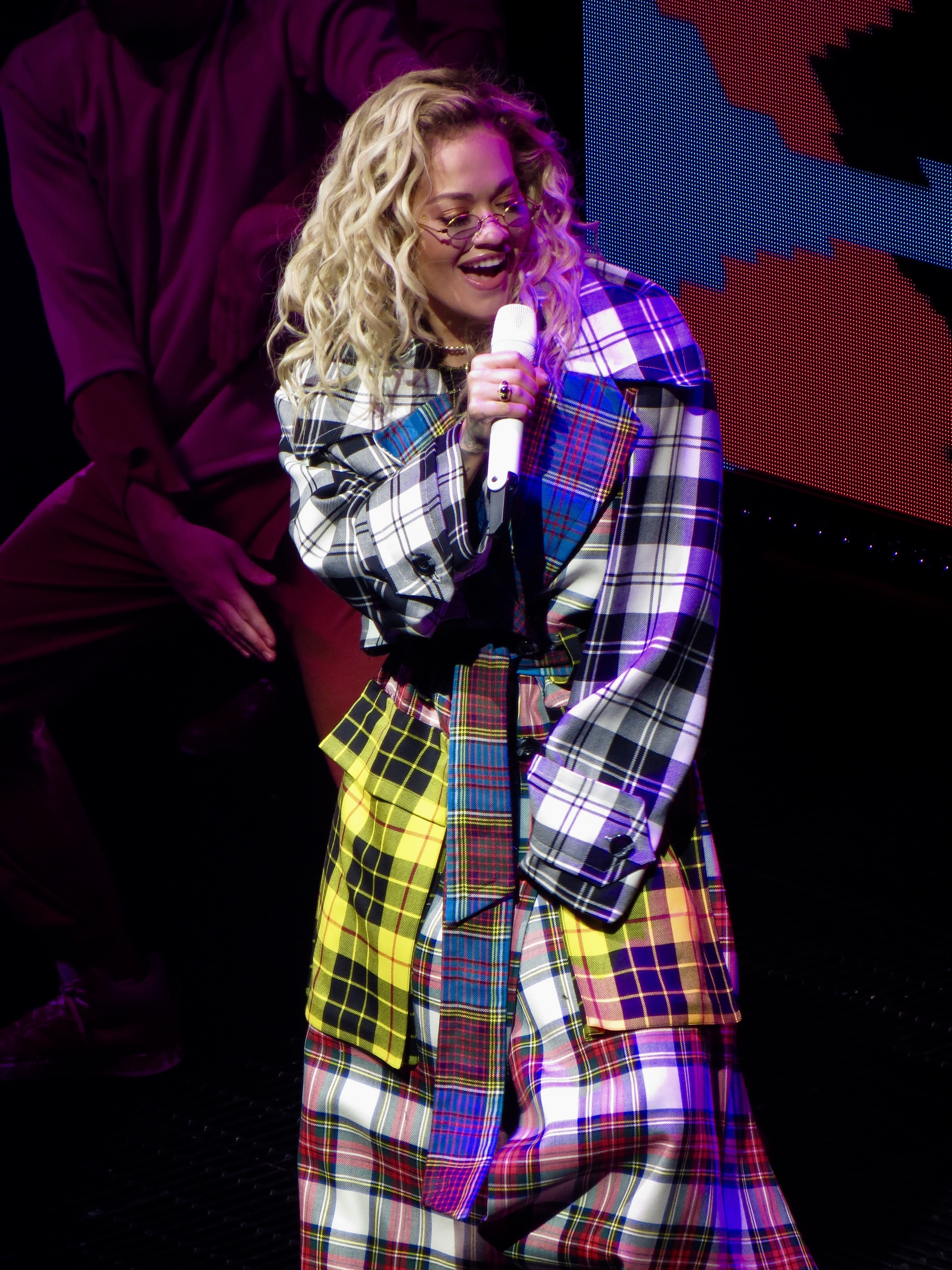
Rita Ora performing in Glasgow in 2018, wearing a tartan trench coat made of at least five different setts

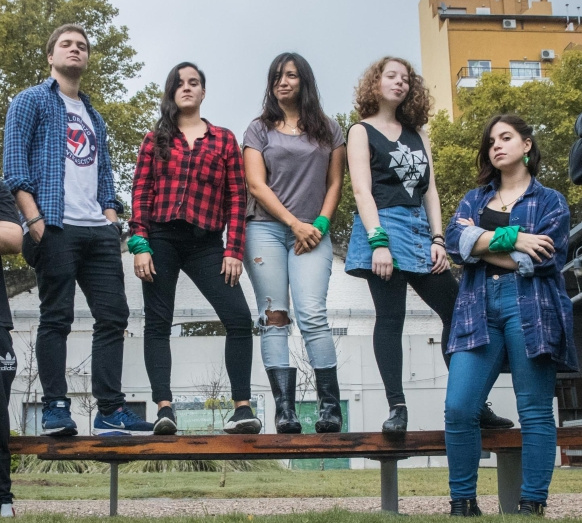
Grunge fashion still alive and well in 2019, featuring a lot of tartan/plaid shirts

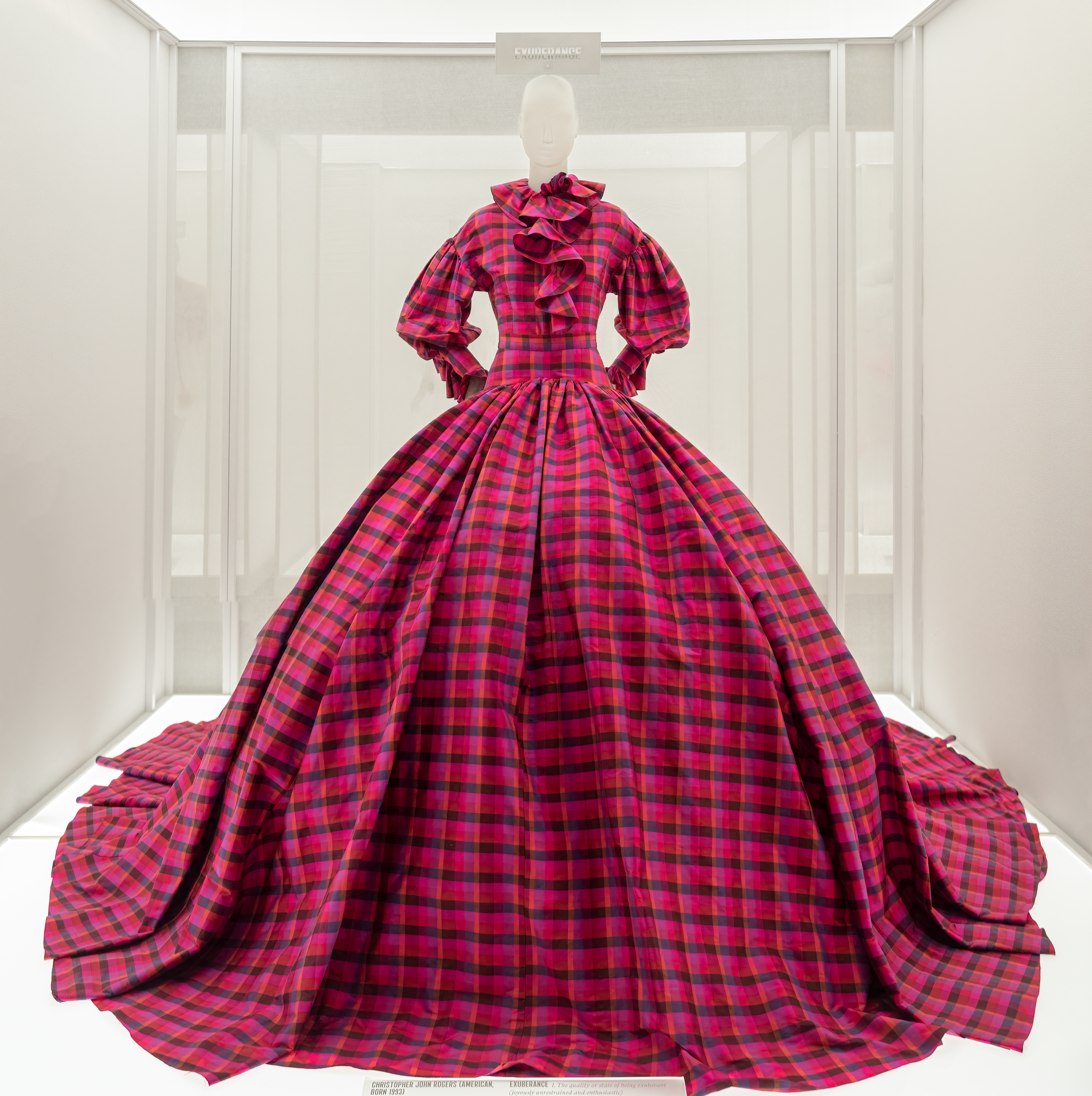
A rather impractical tartan gown by Christopher John Rogers, 2020–21, on display at the Metropolitan Museum of Art Costume Institute's exhibit In America: A Lexicon of Fashion

== Popular designs ==
One of the most popular tartans is the royal Stewart, ostensibly the personal tartan of the British monarch, since George IV declared it his own (though it was probably designed by the Sobieski Stuarts, albeit based on mid-18th-century pattern called "Prince Charles Edward Stuart"). The "royal" sett was first published in 1831 in the book The Scottish Gaël by James Logan. In addition to its use in clothing, such as skirts and scarves, royal Stewart tartan has also appeared on biscuit tins for Scottish shortbread, and it has also long been favoured by the British punk scene.

Another tartan in very common use by the general public is Black Watch (also known as old Campbell, Grant hunting, and Government). This tartan, a dark variant (and ancestor) of the main Clan Campbell tartan, has long been used by military units in the British Army and other Commonwealth forces.

Early manufacturer Wilsons of Bannockburn made many "fashion", "fancy", or "national" tartans with catalogue numbers or fanciful names, without any association with particular families, districts, or organisations; two popular ones still in use are both usually called "Caledonia". Wilsons No. 3 is found in their 1819 Key Pattern Book and is comparatively simple, while No. 144 is more complex, though of a similar colour scheme, and seems to date to the late 18th century. (The numbering suggests the other does as well.) Some other tartans in this "Caledonia" group were later claimed by clans; e.g. Caledonia No. 43 or "Kidd" became one of the MacPherson tartans.

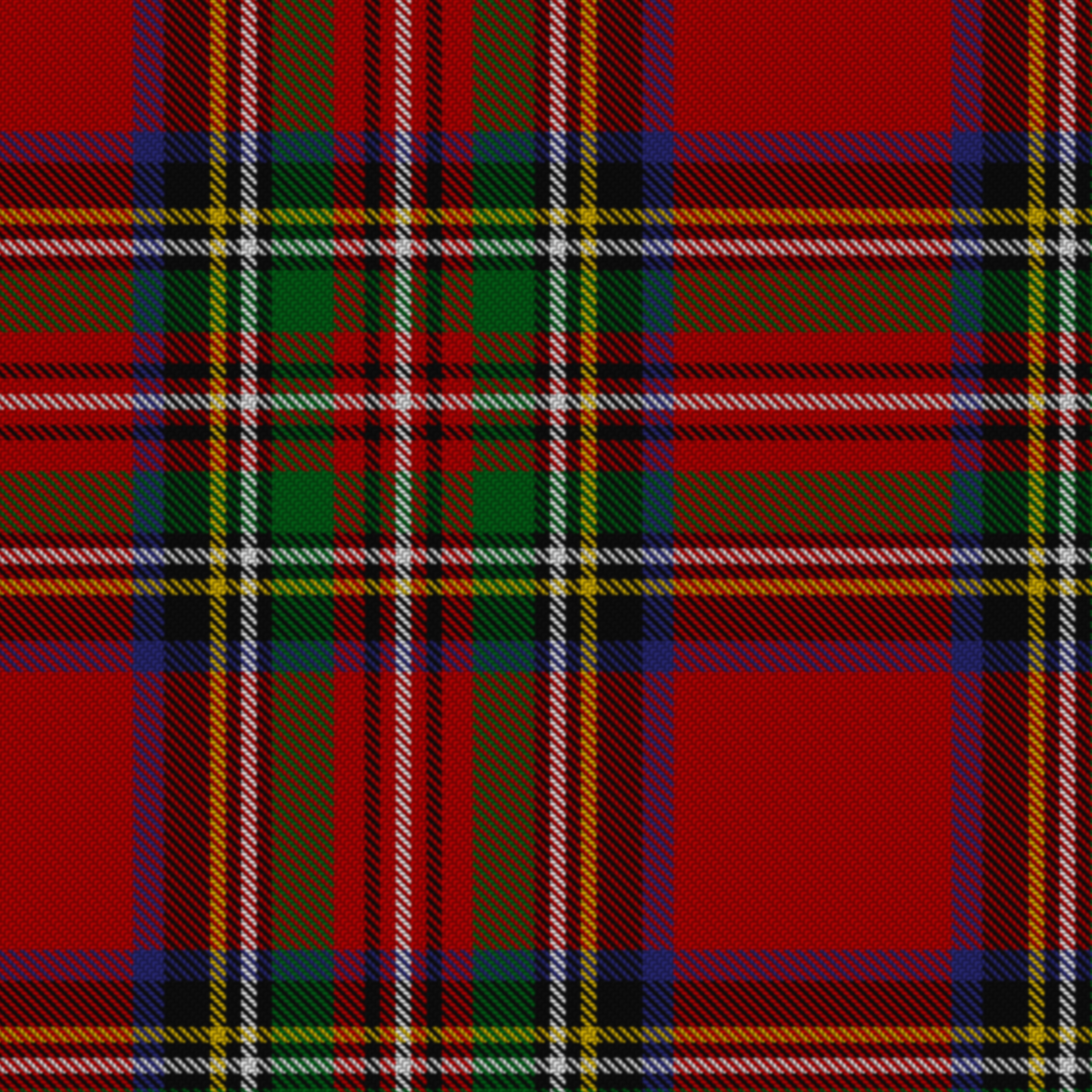
Royal Stewart tartan

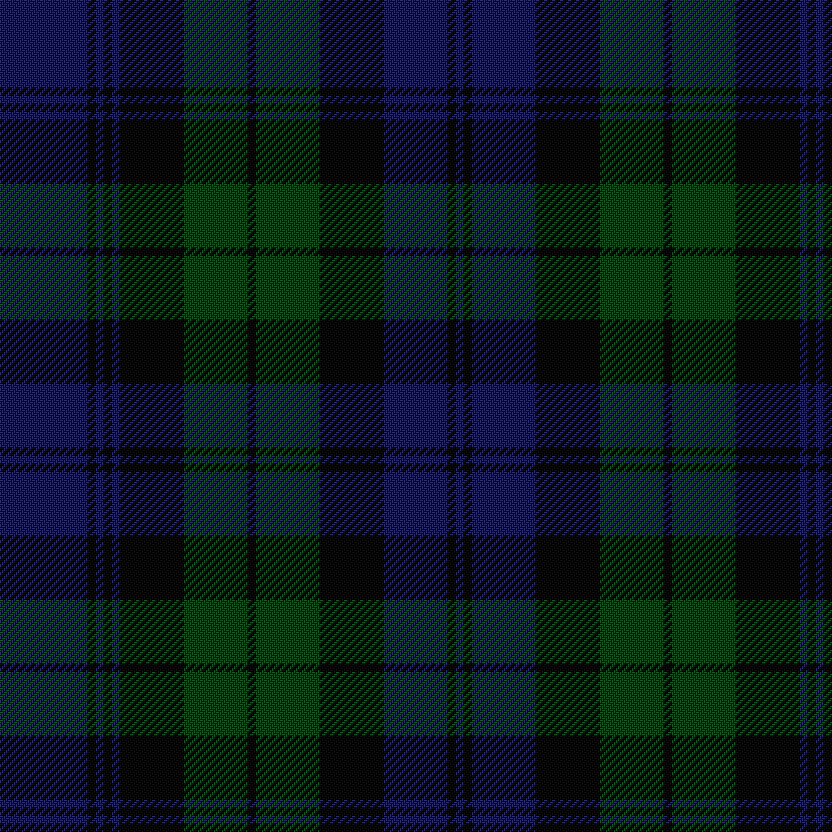
Black Watch tartan

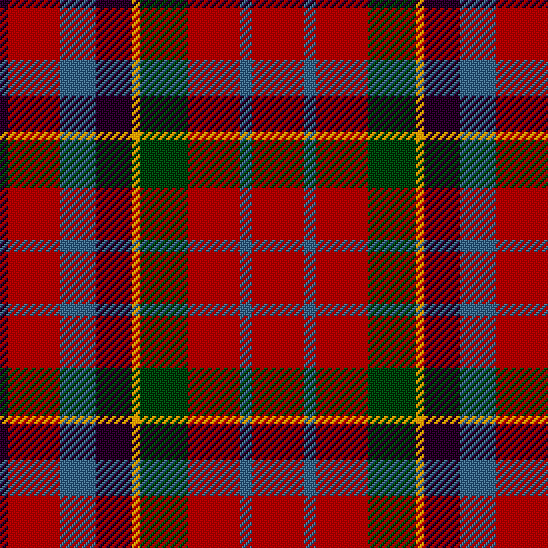
Wilsons' No. 3 tartan, named Caledonia

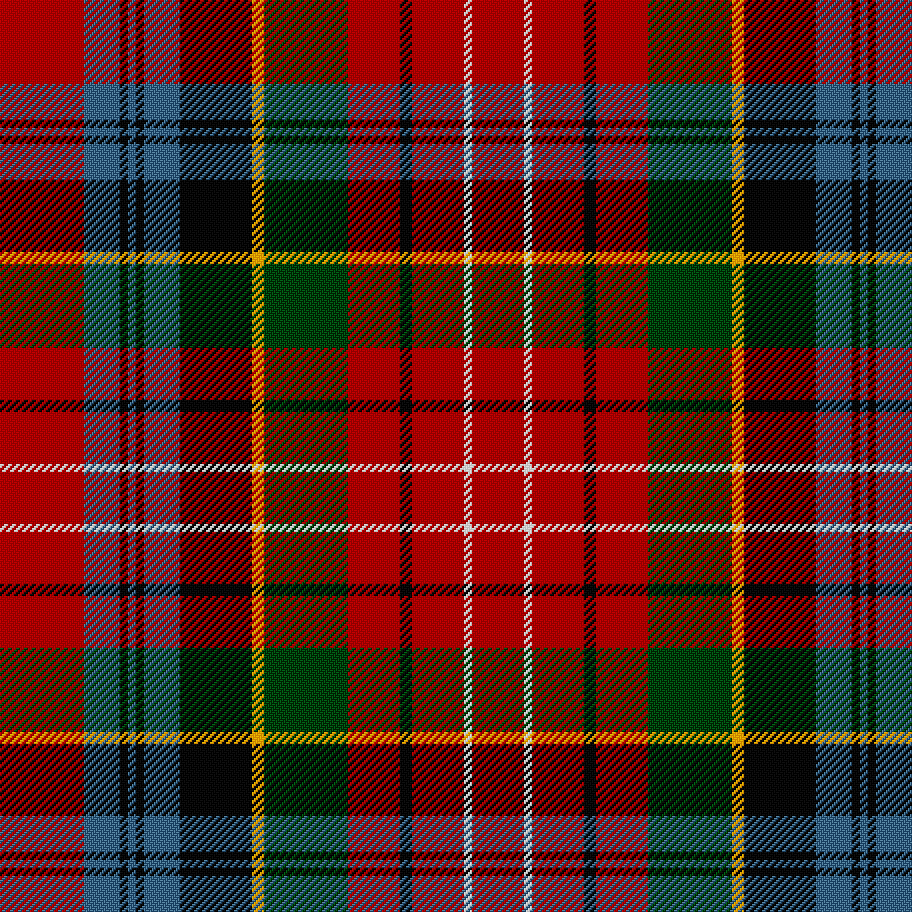
Wilsons' No. 155, also often called Caledonia

In the general fashion industry, various patterns are technically tartan but are not treated as tartans in the clan or district sense. The very basic red-and-black Rob Roy or Robert Roy MacGregor pattern, the oldest of the Clan Gregor setts (though named after Rob Roy in the Victorian period), is also in broad use (often with changed colours) as one of the most common patterns used in flannel cloth for clothing and bedding; in the US, it is often called "buffalo plaid", a term of uncertain derivation. When the Rob Roy sett is changed to a white ground with any other colour this forms the most common gingham cloth style. Gingham is often given a wider setting, to form a lattice appearance (sometimes called "windowpane plaid" or "windowpane check"). When that pattern is given one or more additional over-check colours, the result is the pattern known as tattersall.

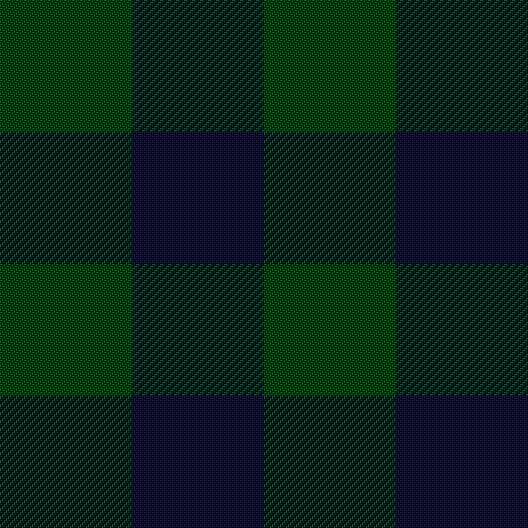
One of the most common flannel patterns, "buffalo plaid" is just Rob Roy MacGregor tartan (originally red and black) rendered in any of various colours

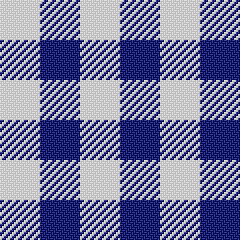
Rob Roy changed to white and any other colour becomes gingham

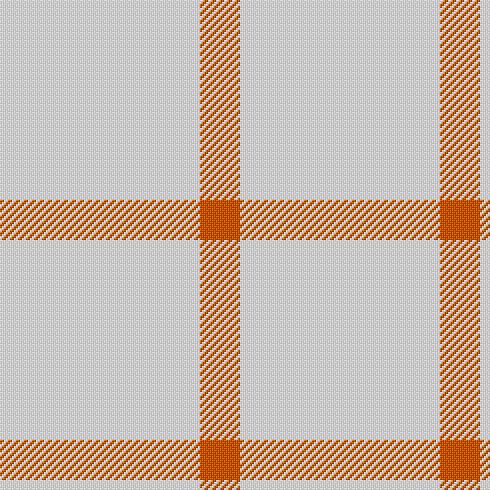
Windowpane gingham

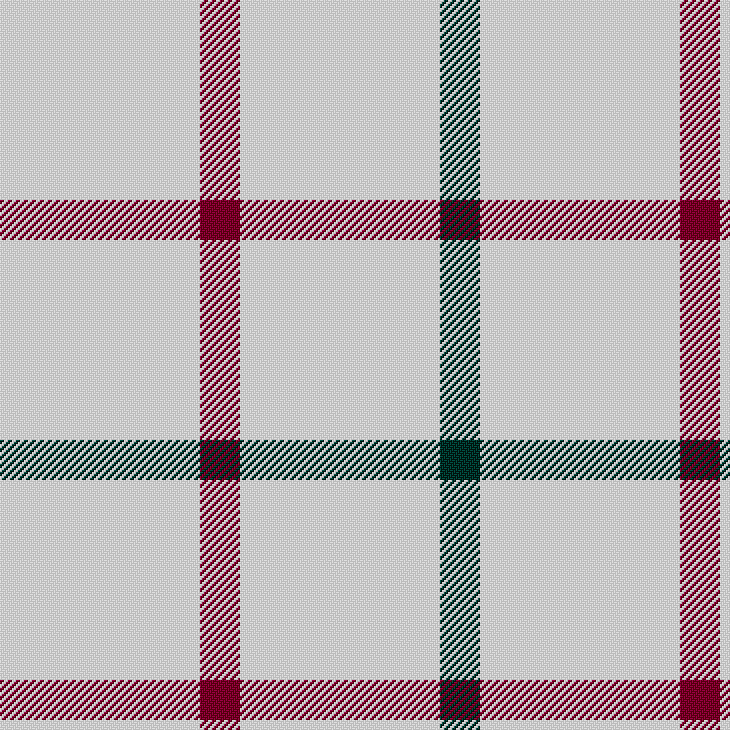
Windowpane gingham with two or more over-checks becomes tattersall

== Tartans for specific purposes ==
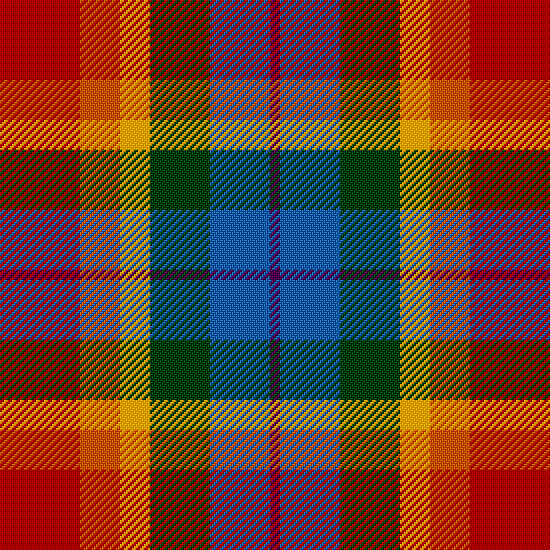
"Tartan of Pride", designed in 2008; one of over a dozen LGBT-themed modern "fashion" tartans

In addition to clan tartans, many tartan patterns have been developed for individuals, families, districts and towns, institutions, corporations, and events. They have even been created for particular religious and ethnic groups, (Note: As examples, modern tartans have been created for Chinese, Jewish, Muslim, and Sikh communities, as well as Italian Scots.) and for sociological groups like the LGBT community. Tartan has had a long history with the military, and today some military units – particularly those within the Commonwealth – have tartan dress uniforms.

=== Regional ===
Many districts, cities, and towns in Scotland have their own tartans, mostly dating to the 20th century (though some few district tartans are quite old), (Note: Wilsons of Bannockburn created several of the comparatively old ones – Aberdeen, Crieff, Dundee, Glasgow, and Perth – simply by naming patterns after the places in which they were the most popular.) and not always official; many were just created for marketing to tourists, and some are copyrighted works tied to specific vendors. They are intended primarily for those to whom a clan tartan does not seem to apply. At least two local government councils in Scotland have official tartans.

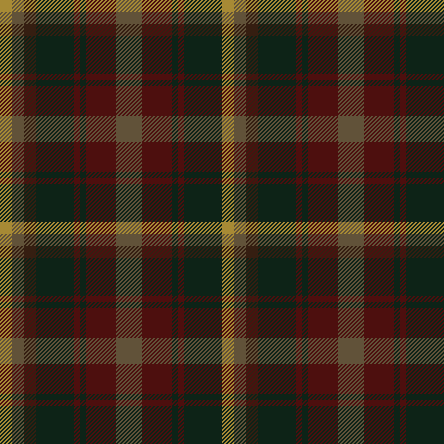
The Maple Leaf tartan, designed in 1964, has been an official symbol of Canada since 2011.

In addition to the traditional district and modern geographic tartans of Scotland, new designs have been created for places in other countries. Only some regional tartans are officially recognised by the government bodies of the places the designs represent.

The pan-Celticism movement has inspired the creation of "national" (in the sense of Celtic nations) and sometimes regional tartans "to emphasise the ... bonds with other Celtic countries" outside of Scotland; none of these appear to have any official recognition. There are tartans of Cornwall, long a part of Devonshire in England (the designs date from 1963 to the 1980s); (Note: Cornish "national" examples:) Wales (from 1967 onward (Note: Welsh national examples:) – sometimes with false claims of antiquity by marketers); the Isle of Man (from 1946, many by D. G. Teall of the Scottish Tartans Society, and several asymmetric); (Note: Manx national examples: The last of these is inexplicably assigned a date of 1863 in SRT, but with a note that seems to indicate it was designed by D. G. Teall of STS in 1981.) Brittany in France (from 2002); (Note: Breton "national" examples:) Galicia in Spain (from 1990); (Note: Galician "national" examples:,) and especially Ireland (from 1956).

After the discovery of the "Dungiven tartan" and its marketing as a district tartan for Ulster, Scottish weavers (and in two cases English, and in another American) decided to tap an Irish and especially Irish-American market by introducing a profusion of national, province, and county tartans for Ireland and Northern Ireland, generally based on established Scottish tartans with some colour changes. These geographical tartans, which (aside from the Dungiven/Ulster reconstruction of 1956) date to 1970 and later, do not have any official recognition, and are purely a product of the industry. One weaver even introduced a competing set of Irish national and county tartans in 1996, different from the previous offerings. "The influence of native Irish people, either as suppliers or consumers of Irish tartans, would appear to be minimal."

Further afield, all but two Canadian provinces and territories have official tartans, with the first dating from 1956. Neither Quebec nor Nunavut, Canada's newest territory, have formally adopted patterns. Alberta, meanwhile, has two official tartans, including a dress one. All but Quebec's were registered with the Court of the Lord Lyon in Scotland. Canada has an official national tartan that was originally designed to commemorate the introduction of its new maple leaf flag, and was made an official national emblem in 2011. Various Canadian regions (like Labrador and Cape Breton Island), counties, municipalities, and institutions also have official tartans. (Note: For example, Bruce County has an official tartan. An example of a Canadian municipality with an official tartan is Beauport, Quebec City.)

Tartans have been created for Australia; its capital city, Canberra; each of its states; and some of its local government areas; but only some of those tartans have been officially adopted or recognised by the relevant governments in Australia. US states have official tartans, with the first dating from 1988.

=== Hunting, mourning, dress, and dance ===
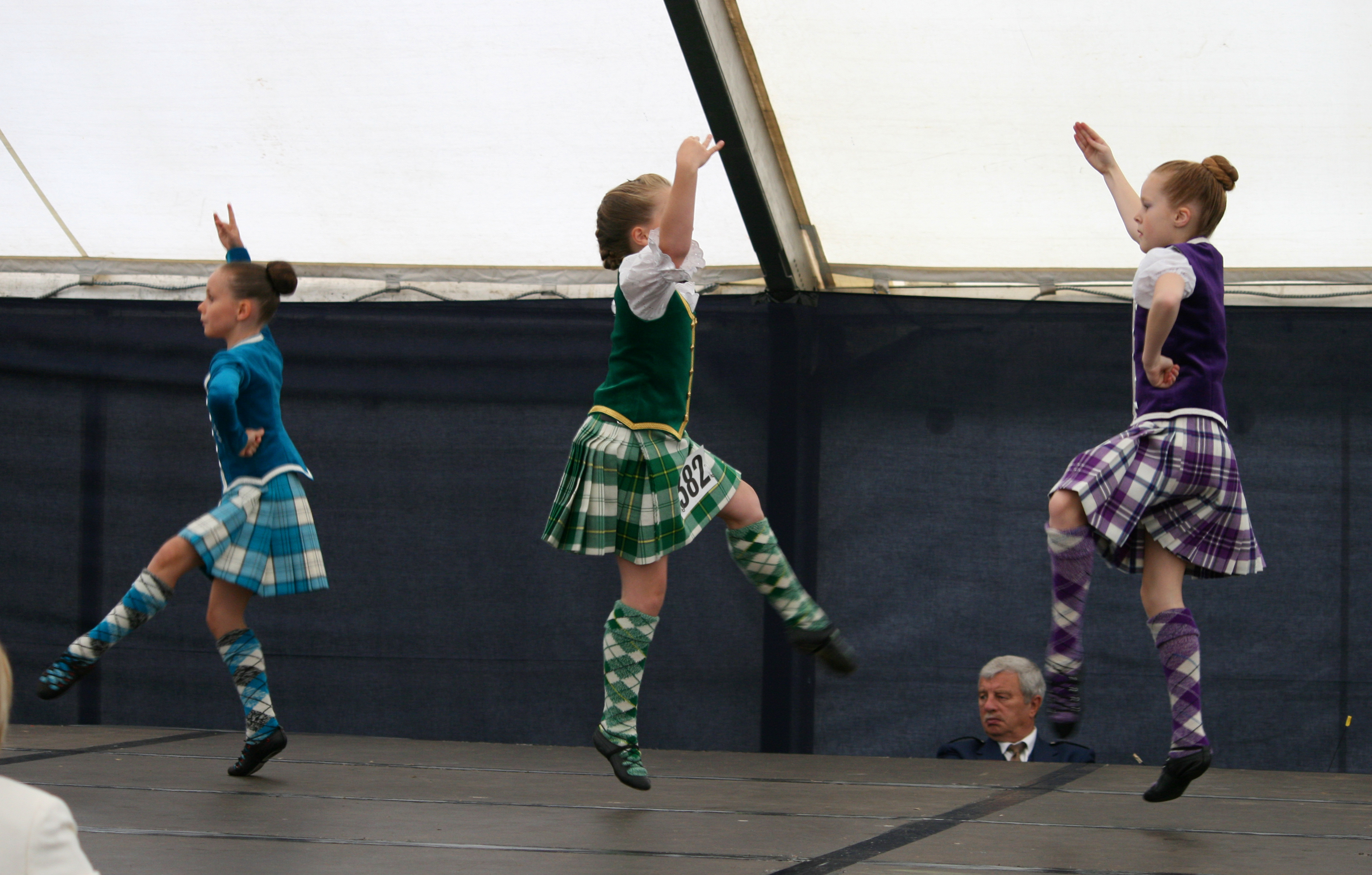
Highland dancing, at a 2008 Highland games event, in Aboyne dresses with dance tartans that feature a lot of white

A tartan is sometimes differentiated from another with the same name by a label: hunting, mourning, dress, or dance. The first three of these ideas are the result of Victorian fondness for dress etiquette and show (and weaver marketing); the last is more recent.

Hunting tartans tend to be made up of subdued colours, such as dark blues, greens, and browns. Although there is some evidence of early tartans with camouflage colours going back to the 16th century, hunting tartans, despite the name, have very little to do with actual hunting.

Mourning tartans, though quite rare, are associated with death and funerals. They are usually designed using combinations of black and white, or by replacing bright colours such as reds and yellows in a traditional tartan with black, white, or grey.

Dress tartans are usually special tartans for formal-dress occasions (e.g. dress Stewart is distinct from both the main royal Stewart tartan and the hunting Stewart, among several other tartans attributed to Stewart/Stuart). In a few cases, a dress tartan is simply the main tartan of the clan. (Note: E.g., Matheson dress is also known simply as Matheson, and is distinguished from a Matheson hunting tartan. As with many Scottish names, there are an accumulation of other fashion and individual tartan designs named "Matheson", but the only two recognised by the Clan Matheson Society are Matheson [dress] and Matheson hunting. Similarly, Shaw of Tordarroch dress is the main tartan, and is distinguished from a hunting variant, with the old, erroneous "Shaw" tartan being retained only as a memorial tartan for a particular family figure.) Dress tartans that do differ from main clan tartans are sometimes entirely different (e.g. MacMillan and MacMillan dress are unrelated designs), while in most cases they are based on the main tartan but with colour differences (e.g. Stewart). Some dress tartans are very modern, but some date back to the era of the Vestiarium Scoticum.

Dance tartans, intended for Highland dance outfits, for either sex, are inspired (like most dress tartans before them) by the arisaid (earasaid tartans thought to have been worn by Highland women in the 17th and 18th centuries, which often featured white as a major colour, as do typical dance tartans today (most or all of which date to the 20th century or later). Some dance tartans are named "arisaid" rather than "dance", e.g. Fraser arisaid. (Note: A photo in Adam (1908/1970) confirms that tartans with white stripes were used for Highland dance outfits at least as far back as the Edwardian period, though the style of female dance-competition dress has notably changed toward kilt-length instead of mid-calf skirts since then.)

There has been some confusion between dress and dance tartans, especially since the idea of the latter developed from the former. (Note: Some writers have confused them as late as the 1980s (which suggests that dance tartans as a conventional category unto themselves may date to the 1990s and later, though some specific dance tartans date to at least the mid-1970s). E.g., J. C. Thompson (1989) conflates dance and dress tartans and treats all dress tartans as if they were white-bearing, despite the clear fact that some dress tartans of considerable age do not have white in them, e.g. Matheson dress from c. 1850.) Most dress tartans, including some of the oldest, also have white in them, and have been used for dance competition in lieu of a dance-specific tartan, so are easy to mistake for dance tartans, which almost invariably have white in them. (Note: The white-heavy MacGregor dance tartan (in three colour variants dating to 1975–2005) is confusingly listed in the Scottish Register of Tartans as both dance and dress, but the chief of Clan Gregor insists it is for dancers only, so it is demonstrably not a general dress-wear tartan. Several other dance tartans are listed also as dress tartans in the SRT, but most appear to be "fashion" inventions by individuals or by woollen mills and are not associated with clans or districts.)

=== Family and individual ===
A large proportion of non-clan tartans in all of the modern tartan databases have always been family tartans, promulgated mostly from the late 20th century for family names that are not clans or listed as septs of clans. These are usually Scottish surnames, but the Scottish Register of Tartans (SRT) database increasingly includes new family tartans for names that are not Scottish or even British. Most family tartans have no copyright claim, since they are intended for use by anyone with the surname or an extended-family connection. The SRT classifies them together with clan tartans in a "clan/family" category if they have history that pre-dates SRT or if they are newer and are approved by a legally recognized clan chief or family head, but in a "name" category if they are newer and lack such imprimatur.

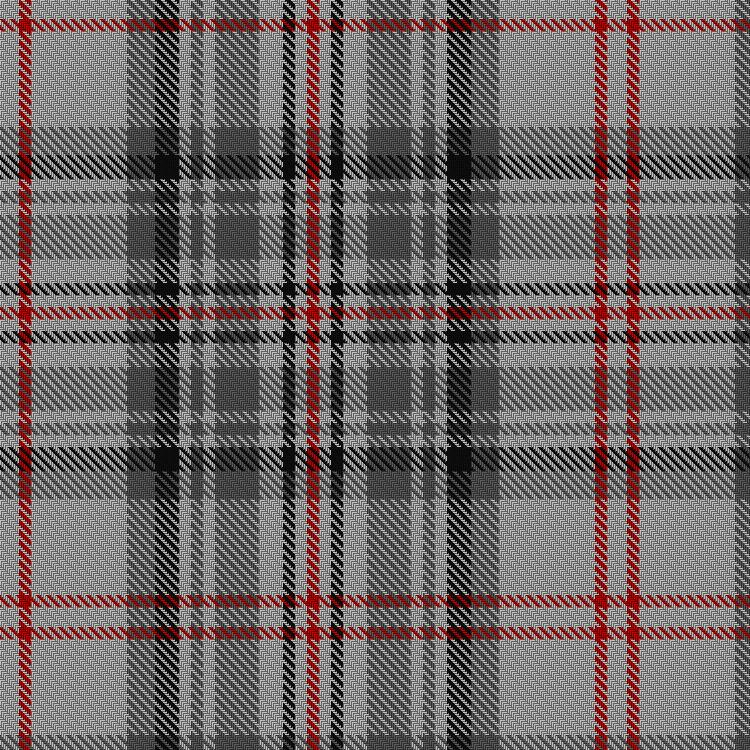
The British royal family's own Balmoral tartan (designed c. 1852). It is incidentally one of the few long-established tartans with multiple hues of the same colour (two greys, in this case).

A few non-clan family tartans have an older pedigree. The best known is Balmoral tartan, reserved for the British royal family and personal pipers thereof, since its creation by Prince Albert c. 1852. (Note: Possibly as early as 1850, and based on the Hay Stewart tartan or on royal Stewart, both probably by the Sobieski Stuarts. It is often misdated to 1853.) Some clans recognise tartans for specific family branches and septs that are not themselves generally regarded as clans. For example, Clan Robertson/Donnachaidh/Duncan acknowledges separate, established tartans (some of them quite old) for Inches, MacGlashan, MacInroy, MacLagan, MacPhee, MacWilliam, Reid, and Robinson, and they are all registered in the SRT.

Since the late 1960s, various weavers have marketed (primarily to Irish Americans) some tartans with Irish family names, without any involvement by family members. There had also been a legend that the rare Clans Originaux (1880) contained Irish family tartans, but this was finally disproven in 2003. (Note: An example of a writer uncritically perpetuating the story can be found in M. B. Paterson (2001).) There is one case of a formal Irish clan/family tartan, however: The Clan Cian Society commissioned a tartan for Cian of Ely, and registered it with the Chief Herald of Ireland in 1983. (Even this has an Irish-American connection, as the chief resided in California, and the society is US-headquartered.) Similarly, a commercial operation in Cardiff named Wales Tartan Centre (supplied by Cambrian Woollen Mill) has since the early 2000s promoted a long series of tartans named for common or prominent Welsh family names; they are unusual in often having odd-numbered thread counts, and having a different warp and weft (producing rectangular rather than square patterns), probably to distinguish them from the Scottish style.

For the much narrower sense of family, the SRT registers also as "name" tartans those that are created by individuals for only themselves and their immediate-family members, often for weddings; these usually have a copyright claim. One of the earliest tartans named for a specific person (Note: As noted above, an early regimental tartan of 1787 was for a while called "Mackenzie–MacLeod" after two commanders, but this was a troop uniform tartan, not one for the named individuals.) is the "Janet Wilson sett", entered into the late 1770s records of Wilsons of Bannockburn and believed to refer to the company founder's wife or daughter-in-law, though made as one of their publicly available patterns. (Note: The sett actually survives in two variants in the SRT, created for an 1880 wedding; they are now sometimes used as Wilson family tartans.)

=== Corporate and commercial ===
Numerous Scottish brands use tartan, and some have unique tartans. Various not-for-profit organisations also have corporate tartans. Probably the earliest case was that of the Ancient Caledonian Society of London (founded in 1786 and defunct since 1837), which used what is believed to have been a consistent tartan for its members' frock coats (which, unusually, featured brocade woven into the tartan, of Jacobite white roses – it may be what 1767 advertisements called "flowered tartan"); only one known example of the coat survives.

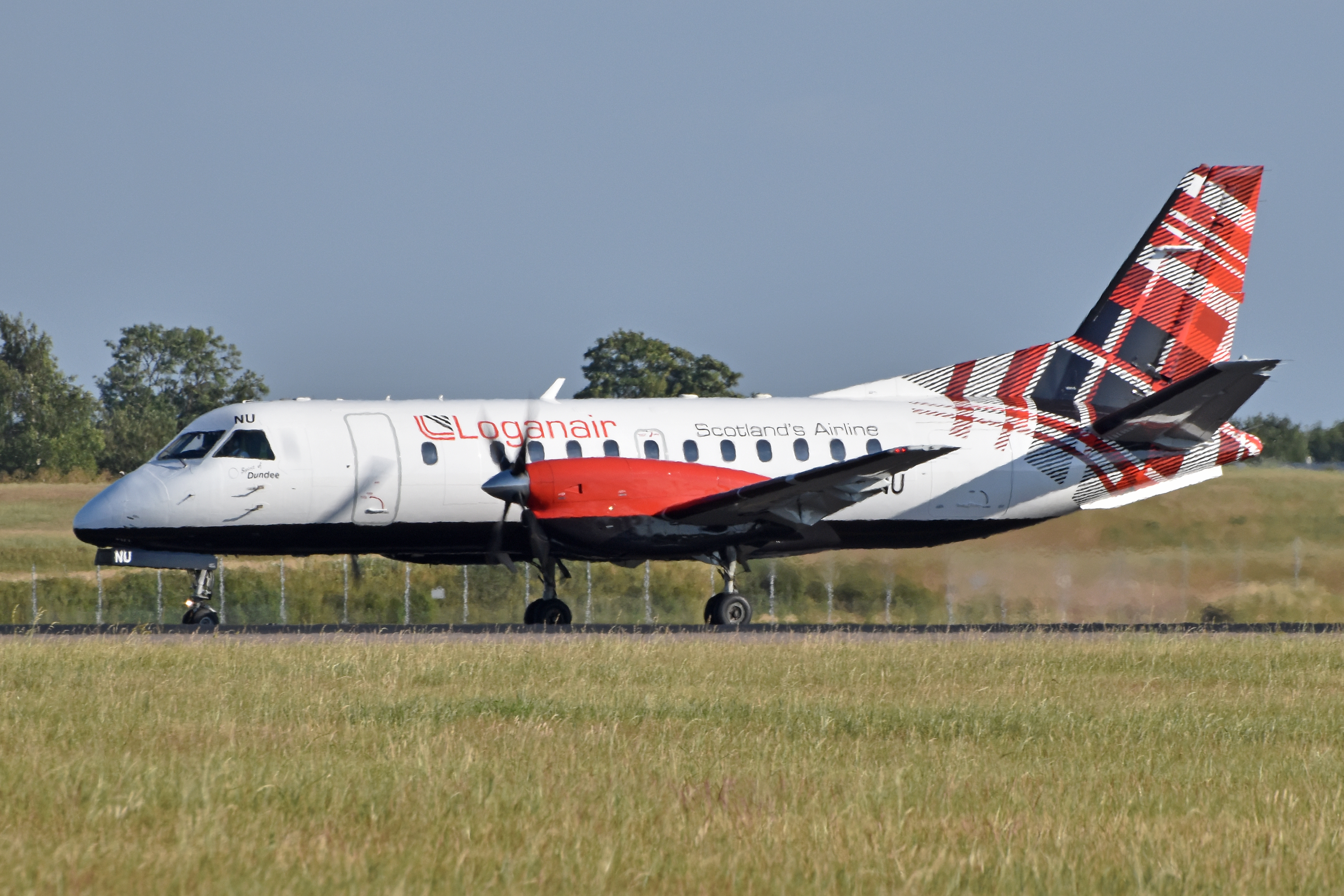
Scottish airline Loganair in its tartan livery

As an example of a modern commercial tartan, Irn-Bru (introduced in 1901), the best-selling soft drink in Scotland, has its own tartan. Scottish regional airline Loganair uses tartan livery, including on the tails of its planes, and has two registered corporate tartans. "Racing Stewart" is a pattern created in 1995 for the Jackie Stewart Formula One car-racing team.

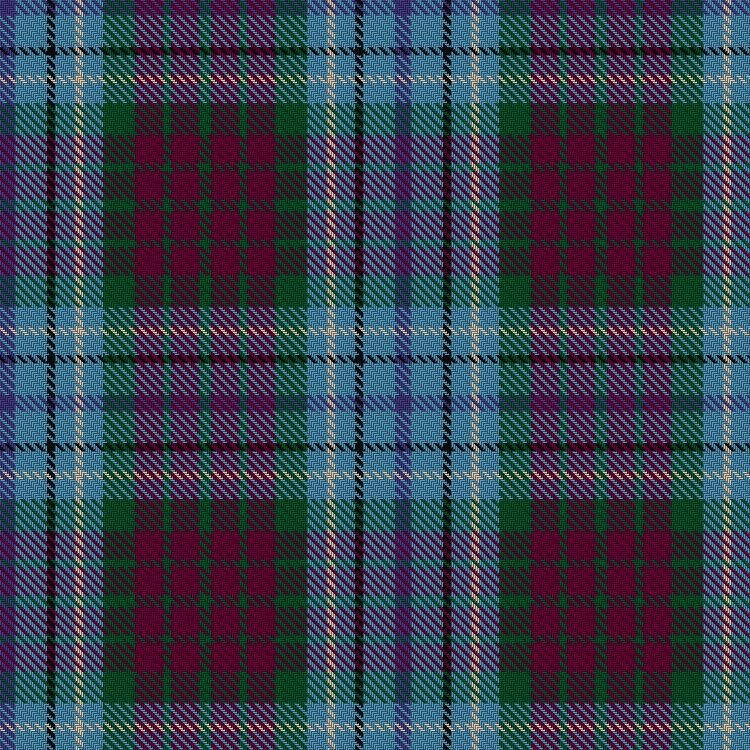
"DunBroch", a tartan devised by Disney/Pixar for fictional characters in the animated film Brave

The "corporate" category is one of the fastest-growing in the official Scottish Register of Tartans (SRT) database, with a large number of Scottish (and American and other) companies and societies registering organisational tartans. These are generally protected by copyright and sometimes trademark law. These tartans vary in purpose from general corporate livery, to special event tartans, to tartans for fictional characters.

Two examples of the latter are Sanrio's 2004 creation of a predominantly pink tartan for Hello Kitty; and the 2011 creation by Disney/Pixar of the DunBroch tartan for the family of the main character, Mérida, of the animated Highland fantasy/adventure film Brave.

==== Fashion ====
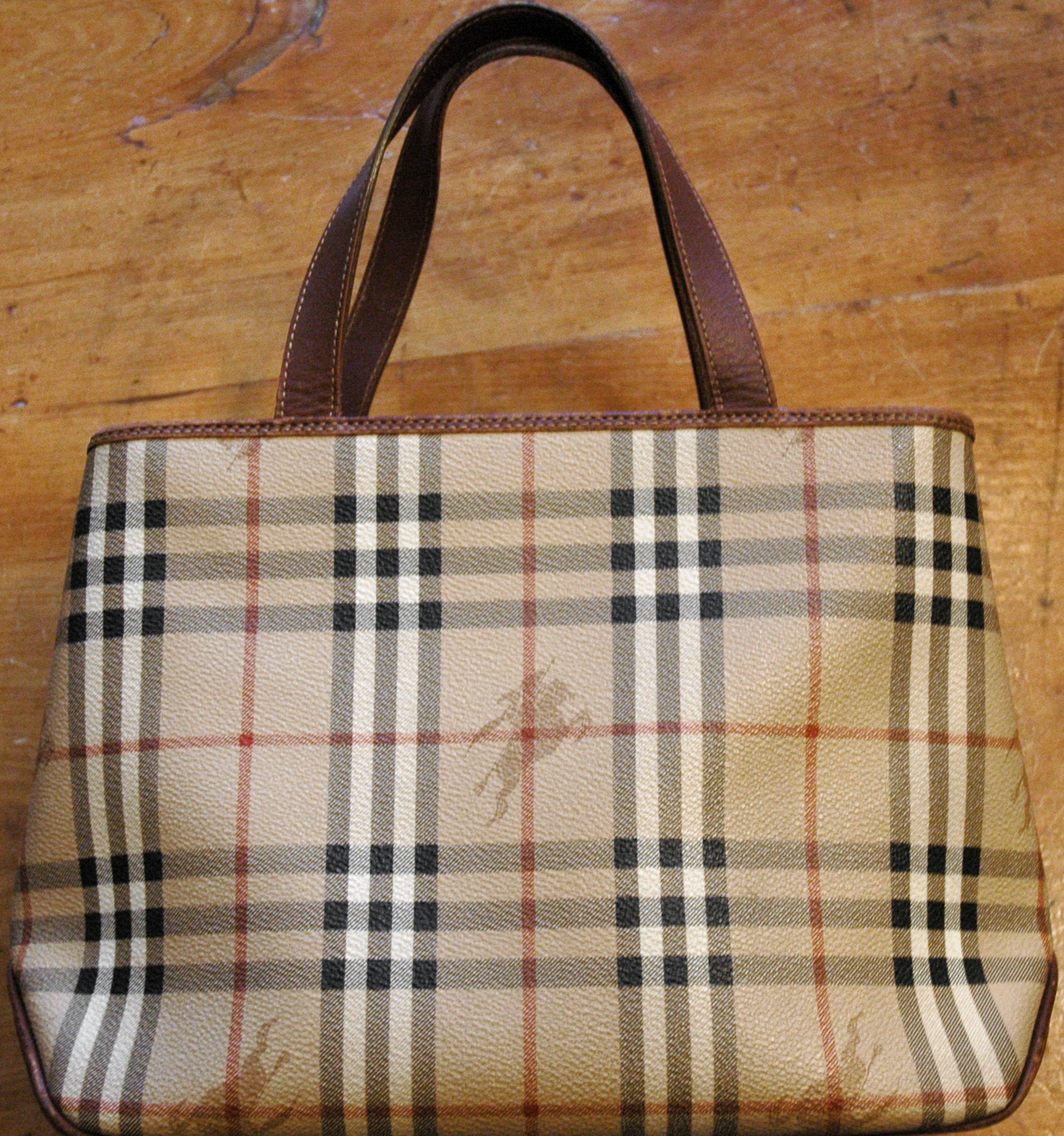
Handbag in Burberry check

An early example of a tartan created by and for the fashion industry, and surely the most famous, is "Burberry check". It was introduced in the 1920s for the lining of trench coats made by Burberry of London, but has been used for all manner of clothing and accessories since 1967 (with another major marketing push in 2001) and is emblematic of the company and its upscale product line.

A fast-growing category in the SRT is that of "fashion" tartans, created by companies and individual designers simply for aesthetic reasons, without any association with a particular clan, family, region, etc. Like organisational tartans, most of these have a copyright claim attached to them.

A prominent example: In 2017, Scottish fashion designer Charles Jeffrey designed a signature tartan for his Loverboy label, registering it in the SRT.

== Regulation ==
Manufacture and use of tartan (at least in the Scottish context) is regulated, formally and informally, in three ways: registration (recording of a tartan and its association, if any, with a particular family, organisation, person, event, etc.); legal protection of a tartan as intellectual property (trademark, copyright); and etiquette (socio-cultural norms regarding the use of tartan and Highland dress).

=== Registration ===
Coat of arms of the Scottish Register of Tartans

The naming and registration of "official" clan tartans began in 1815, when the Highland Society of London solicited clan tartans from clan chiefs.

Following recognition by a clan chief of a tartan as a clan tartan, the chief was formerly able to petition the Lord Lyon King of Arms, the Scottish heraldic authority, to register it as a formal clan tartan. (Note: The Lord Lyon would only accept formal clan tartan registrations from clan chiefs; this excluded chiefless armigerous clans from tartan registration with the Lord Lyon, whether or not they had latter-day clan associations/societies. However, many now-armigerous clans were able to register tartans with the Lord Lyon before they became chiefless, and these registrations remain in the Lyon Court Books. The Lord Lyon seemed to consider a clan that has had a chief to remain a clan and not just a family/surname (the Lord Lyon did not do any registration of family tartans, i.e. those for non-clan surnames), though a statement by the Lord Lyon on this matter in 2002 is not as clearly worded as it could have been.) Once approved by the Lord Lyon, after recommendation by the Advisory Committee on Tartan, the clan tartan was then recorded in the Lyon Court Books. However, leading up to the launch of the Scottish Register of Tartans in 2009, the office of the Lord Lyon stopped providing this tartan-recording process (though its statutory authority was not changed by the Tartans Bill).

Modern-day tartans can be created and registered by anyone, with the Scottish Register of Tartans. Modern registered tartans include ones for Scottish and other districts, cities, and towns; for Irish counties (devised since the 1990s) and families (for example, the surname Fitzpatrick has two registered tartans); for organisations and companies; and even for specific events or individuals. Tartans are also being created in record numbers among the Scottish diaspora in the United States, Canada, Australia, New Zealand, etc., especially for places, military divisions, pipe bands, and individuals and their immediate families.

Until the late 20th century, instead of a central official tartan registry, independent organisations located in Scotland, Canada, and the United States documented and recorded tartans. In 1963, an organisation called the Scottish Tartans Society (now defunct, and originally named Scottish Tartans Information Centre) was created to record and preserve every known tartan design. The society's Register of All Publicly Known Tartans (RAPKT) contained about 2,700 different designs of tartan. Registration of new designs was not free of charge. The society, however, ran into financial troubles in 2000, and folded.

Former members of that society formed two new Scotland-based entities – the Scottish Tartans Authority (STA, 1996 – before STS closed) and the Scottish Tartans World Register (STWR, 2000 – the trade name of a private company, Tartan Registration Ltd). Both of these organisations initially based their databases on the RAPKT. STA's database, the International Tartan Index (ITI) consisted of about 3,500 different tartans (with over 7,000, counting variants) as of 2004. The online ITI was later rebranded The Tartan Ferret. STWR's self-titled Scottish Tartans World Register database was made up of about 3,000 different designs as of 2004. Both organisations were registered as Scottish charities and recorded new tartans (free in the case of STA and for a fee in the case of STWR) on request.

In the interim, a jointly Scotland- and US-based organisation, International Association of Tartan Studies and Tartan Educational & Cultural Association (IATS/TECA) emerged in 1984 and published its own TartanArt database in the early 1990s as Microsoft Windows software which was much used in the North American kilt-making trade. IATS/TECA was absorbed by STA by 2005.

The Scottish Register of Tartans (SRT) is Scotland's official tartan register, and was established in 2009. SRT is maintained and administered by the National Archives of Scotland (NAS), a statutory body based in Edinburgh. The aim of the register is to provide a definitive and accessible resource to promote and preserve tartans. It is also intended to be the definitive source for the registration of new tartans (if they pass criteria for inclusion and a registration fee is paid). The database itself – also named simply Scottish Register of Tartans, and sometimes called TartanRegister from its domain name – is made up of the pre-existing registers of STA and STWR as they were at the time of SRT's launch (preserving the STA's and STWR's registration numbers, dates, and other details in the SRT data), plus new registrations from 5 February 2009 onward. On the register's website, users can register new tartans, search for existing tartans and request their thread counts, and receive notifications of newly registered tartans.

STWR became defunct some time after 2008. STA later closed the ITI/Tartan Ferret to new registrations, and in late 2022 removed the search feature from the STA website (pending a site redesign), deferring to the Scottish Register of Tartans, which now appears to be the only operating tartan registry. STA continues offline work on the ITI database, correcting errors, importing new SRT additions, and recording historical patterns newly discovered in museum holdings, etc.

=== Legal protection ===
Some modern tartans are protected by trademark law, and the trademark proprietor can, in certain circumstances, prevent others from selling that tartan. An example is the "Burberry check" of the English fashion house, an instantly recognisable tartan that is very well known around the world. (Note: In 2003, Burberry demanded members of the tartan industry to stop trading a certain Thomson Camel tartan. Burberry claimed this tartan was confusingly similar to their Burberry check and that it thus infringed their registered trademark. Burberry took legal action again in 2013 to protect its tartan trademark in China.)

Unlike trademark registration and copyright registration, the Scottish Register of Tartans (SRT) and its authorising Tartans Bill do not create any new or enhanced intellectual property rights through the act of registration (nor provide any enforcement mechanism other than removal of infringing entries from the registry).

SRT, however, permits registrants optionally to assert and record copyright and/or trademark claims over their new tartans, for designs that are eligible for such protection under other established law (such as the Copyright, Designs and Patents Act 1988; and the Scotland Act 1998, which took over copyright and trademark registration and enforcement in Scotland) and lists such tartans as restricted. An SRT registration "provides evidence of the existence and date of [the] design", which helps establish the copyright date under the Berne Copyright Convention. Such legal protections apply only to comparatively recently created tartans; old clan, regimental, and district tartans are outside the protection periods of such intellectual property laws.

SRT also permits the listing of intended use and manufacture restriction preferences, but has no enforcement capability, and also includes a statement that "No other rights can be conferred." British tartan weavers, such as Lochcarron and D. C. Dalgliesh, generally will not produce material in an SRT "restricted" tartan without written evidence of permission from the copyright/trademark claimant. In additional furtherance of intellectual property concerns, the SRT also refuses to register a new tartan that is confusingly similar to any existing one (as determined by an SRT review process).

The application of copyright law to tartans is not well tested. The leading British legal case on textile copyright, concerned with designs printed on fabric, is Designer Guild Ltd v Russell Williams (Textiles) Ltd (2000), finding for fairly broad copyright protection in textile works that involve creative originality. In 2008, two tartan pattern copyright holders, Rosemary Nicolson Samios and weaver Lochcarron of Scotland, took legal action for infringement of an Isle of Skye district sett (designed 1993) and the Princess Diana Memorial sett (designed 1997), respectively, against the Gold Brothers firm of Surinder, Galab, Malap, and Dildar Singh, who operate dozens of stores in Scotland and online that sell primarily Chinese-made tartan objects or "tartan-tat", including cheap Highland-dress outfits, for the tourist market. The Isle of Skye tartan was considerably profitable for Samios, after the pattern was popularised by Queen Elizabeth II wearing it in 1999. The Princess Diana sett was designed by Alistair Buchan of Lochcanrron and of the Scottish Tartans Authority as a charity fundraiser. A British court on 2 July 2008 issued an interim interdict (preliminary injunction) against Gold Brothers' sale of Isle of Skye goods, after a police search found hundreds of metres of the pattern in Chinese-made cloth in the company's warehouse. Both cases may have been settled out-of-court because published news regarding them ceases in 2008. A more recent case, Abraham Moon & Sons Ltd v. Thornber & Others (2012), actually involved tartan. It held that the textual ticket stamp (a detailed set of weaving instructions, i.e. a thread count with additional information on precise colours, etc.) used to produce a tartan designed in-house by the claimant had been infringed, was protected as a literary work, and also constituted a "recording" of the graphical work of the tartan and thus was independently protected as a work of artistic craftsmanship. As of 2020, the decision was being appealed, as it conflicted with previous caselaw, e.g. Hensher v Restawile (1976), holding such instructions to be uncopyrightable.

While tartan arguably could be classified as a form of intangible cultural heritage, and its value to identifying Scottish products both in Scotland and internationally has been recognised and exploited for a long time, tartan is not protected by either geographical indication (protected designation of origin) law, nor sui generis legislation specific to that kind of product. Harris tweed, another textile associated more narrowly with Scotland, does have such protection. In 1998, Keith Lumsden, research officer of the Scottish Tartans Society, proposed that the word tartan be prohibited for use to market a textile, unless the design was accepted in an official governmental tartan registry (which did not then exist). When the Scottish Parliament finally authorised the Scottish Register of Tartans in 2008, it did not include anything like this sort of trade protection. According to Michael B. Paterson (2001): "No mechanism exists to protect [traditional Scottish] tartan from 'misuse' by interests having nothing to do with Scotland or Scotland's interests", though the tartan registries "play an important, if weak, role in asserting Scotland's cultural rights in relation to tartan."

=== Etiquette ===
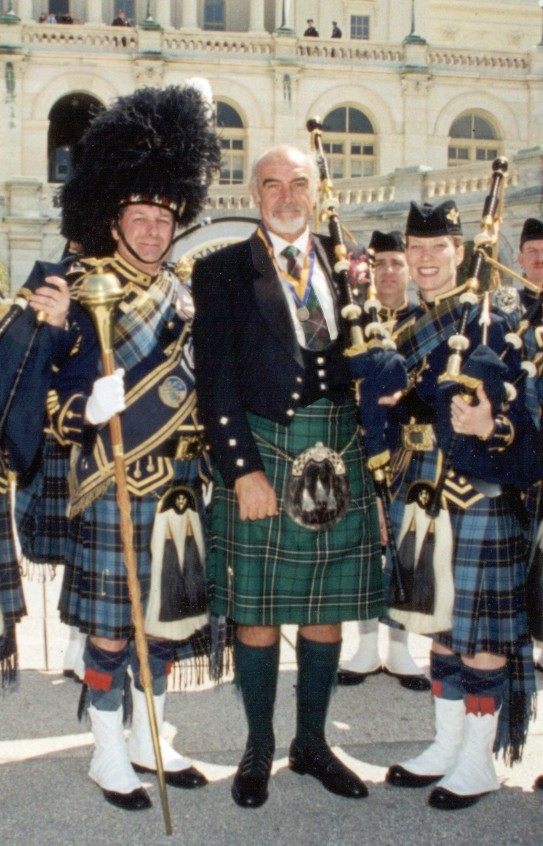
Scottish actor Sean Connery at a Tartan Day celebration in Washington DC. When knighted by Queen Elizabeth II in 2000, he wore this green-and-black hunting-tartan kilt of his mother's Clan Maclean.

Since the Victorian era, authorities on tartan have claimed that there is an etiquette to wearing tartan, specifically tartan attributed to clans or families. In the same line of opinion, some tartans attributed to the British royal family have been claimed to be "off limits" to non-royalty. Even so, there are no laws or universally accepted rules on who can or cannot wear a particular tartan. (Some writers have nevertheless asserted their existence anyway, e.g. Alexander Campbell in 1890, regarding different Campbell tartans.) The concept of the entitlement to certain tartans has led to the term universal tartan, or free tartan, which describes tartan which can be worn by anyone without controversy. Traditional examples of such are the Black Watch, Caledonia, hunting Stewart, and Jacobite tartans, shepherds' check, and district tartans. The published marketing of tartans for simple fashion purposes without any association to a place or body dates back to at least 1745, and much of Wilsons' output through the 19th century consisted of "fancy" patterns for the general public. Some recently created designs intended for everyone (though some are exclusive to particular weavers or Highland-dress outfitters) have names including Braveheart, Clansman, European Union, Highlander, Independence, Pride of Scotland, Rainbow, Scotland 2000, Scotland the Brave, Scottish National, Scottish Parliament, Spirit of Scotland, Stone of Destiny, and Twenty First Century.

Books on Scottish clans list guidelines, but are not always in agreement. One such opinion is that people not bearing a clan surname, or surname claimed as a sept of a clan, should not wear the tartan of their mother's clan. This opinion is reinforced by the fact that in the Scottish clan system, the Lord Lyon states that membership to a clan technically passes through the surname. This means that children who bear their father's surname belong to the father's clan (if any), and that children who bear their mother's surname (her maiden name) belong to their mother's clan (if any). Also, the Lord Lyon states that a clan tartan should only be worn by those who profess allegiance to that clan's chief.

Some clan societies even claim that certain tartans are the personal property of a chief or chieftain, and in some cases they allow or deny their clansfolk "permission" to wear that tartan. (Note: For example, the Clan Cameron Association website states that the Cameron of Lochiel tartan "is the personal tartan of the Chief and his immediate family; as a rule it should not be worn by clansfolk".) According to the Scottish Tartans Authority – which is an establishment of the Scottish tartan industry – the Balmoral tartan should not be worn by anyone who is not part of the British royal family. Even so, some weavers outside of the United Kingdom ignore the "longstanding convention" of the British royal family's "right" to this tartan. The society also claims that non-royals who wear this tartan are treated with "great disdain" by the Scottish tartan industry. (Note: Since 1937, the only non-royals permitted by the British royal family to wear the Balmoral tartan are the monarch's own personal piper and pipers at the royal Balmoral estate. Even royal family members only wear it with the permission of the monarch. The official website of the monarchy of the United Kingdom claims the tartan is not available for purchase.)

Generally, a more liberal attitude had been taken by those in the business of selling tartan, holding that anyone may wear any tartan they like. Under the liberal view, claimed "rules" are mere conventions (some of which are recent creations), with different levels of importance depending on the symbolic meaning of the tartan on some particular occasion.

The Standing Council of Scottish Chiefs has also taken a fairly flexible position (organisationally; some specific individual chiefs may have a narrower or looser take, and not all chiefs are members). Aside from opposing the creation of a new tartan using a clan's name without the chief's permission, their website states (adopting more loosely some ideas from the Lord Lyon view):

There are no strict rules on who has the right to wear a particular tartan. People normally wear only the tartan (if any) of their surname, or a "district tartan" connected with where they live or where their family come from. Wearing a particular clan tartan indicates that the wearer bears an allegiance to the chief of that clan.

Some Highland-dress historians have taken a dim view of regulatory intents and proclamations with regard to tartans; Scottish National Portrait Gallery curator A. E. Haswell Miller wrote that "to claim special entitlement to a tartan in the same manner as heraldic arms is certainly absurd", because evidence suggests that the idea was just invented by writers of the late 18th to mid-19th centuries. Sir Thomas Dick Lauder expressed similar views as far back as 1829, right in the middle of the "clan tartanry" rush, dismissing both the then-new adoption of "official" clan tartans and attempts by clans to claim regimental ones.

== In other cultures ==
While tartan has been most closely associated with Scotland, and dating back to the Roman period was perhaps associated with Northwestern Europe in general, it is likely that the idea of using patterns of rectangles and lines has independently occurred many times, in any cultures with weaving. Basic tartan "is almost as primitive a weave as it is possible to make ... probably the earliest form of patterened fabric anywhere." Surviving pre-modern historical examples seem sparse, however.

Modern tartan-style cloth in a wide variety of materials and patterns from simple to complex is available and used today around the world, often simply as a style of cloth and without any association with Scotland.

=== Africa ===
==== Maasai shúkà ====
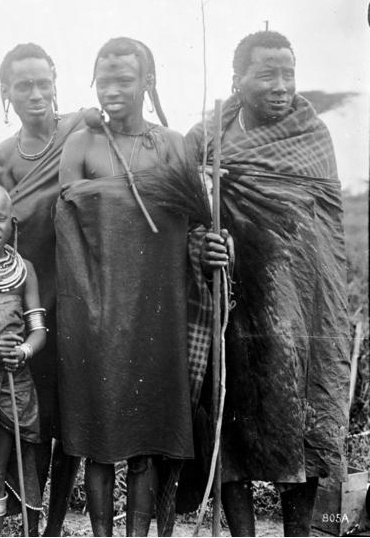
Maasai men c. 1906–1918, one wearing a tartan shúkà; photo by Walther Dobbertin

Among the Maasai people of Kenya and Tanzania, the shúkà is a cotton blanket-like garment (what Scots would call a plaid) worn as a wrap, and very commonly in a tartan pattern, though sometimes linearly striped or of one colour. Shúkà are predominantly red, though sometimes seen in blue and other colours.

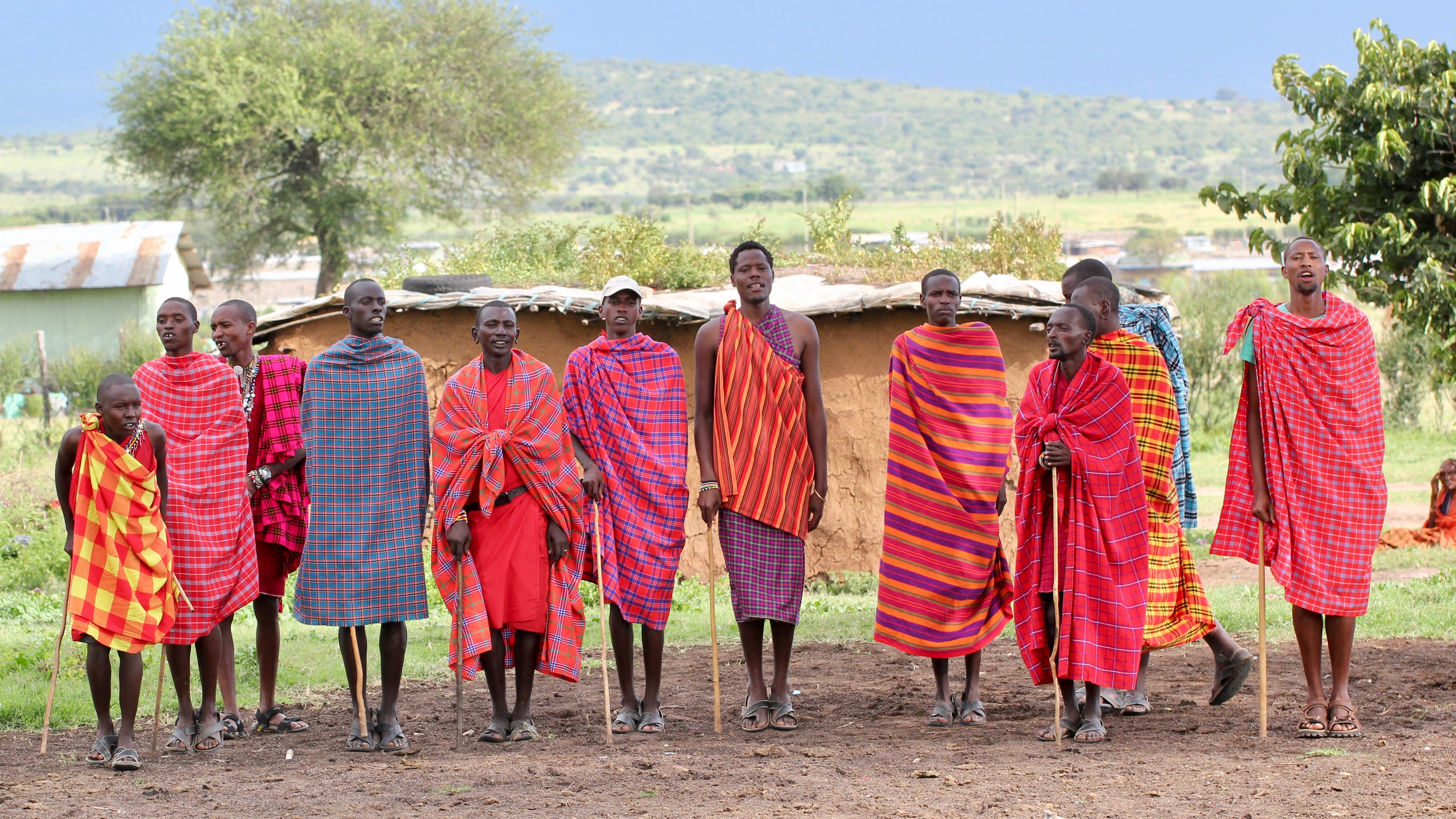
Maasai men in shúkà; Narok County, Kenya, 2018

Shúkà were originally of painted (typically red) leather, but Maasai have had access to plain-weave cotton fabric for some time, imported to the region by Americans since the 1860s. Joseph Thomas Last, a British missionary, in 1883 described the Maasai as particularly fond of red and white cloth, to be worn by higher-status men (though he did not mention tartan in particular); a 1903 report also had them typically wearing red blanket-like garments, after a time of favouring blue. The Maasai were loosely allied with the British, 1895–1904, and the latter made heavy use of Scottish regiments in African conflicts, bringing tartan with them. However, "Guinea cloth" (mostly produced in India), sometimes red and blue checked, was a common commodity in 18th-century western Africa, pre-dating British West Africa; whether it relates at all to shúkà is unknown. Shúkà patterns usually lack the thin black lines common in Scottish tartans.

A nomadic cattle-pastoralist culture, without their own weaving tradition, the Maasai have been described as unusually culturally conservative and resistant to modernisation. Nevertheless, they have always engaged in trade to get goods they do not make themselves, and have made local traditional use of modern materials. The Maasai approach has been to resist yet assimilate colonial and post-colonial influences.

Although there is evidence of tartan usage among the Maasai to at least the period 1906–1918, when Walther Dobbertin photographed a tartan shúkà in what was then German East Africa, the current bright tartan and striped style of shúkà appears to have been adopted primarily in the 1960s (partly in response to national-level clothing modernisation pressure), supplanting leather but keeping the same form-factor. The shift in outward form without affecting function led one writer to quip that Maasai dress "has undergone dramatic changes while not changing at all". Tartan-patterned cloth is not typically used for other Maasai garments besides shúkà.

The shúkà has become so emblematic of the Maasai that there is some discussion (driven by the Maasai themselves) at the national and regional level about protecting it as a form of cultural property. While it has been claimed that shúkà patterns, at least at one time, conveyed particular meanings, (Note: Oyange-Ngando (2018): "the intentional and specific arrangement of colour where each bears a certain meaning, for example a colour arrangement could represent age, clan or marital status of an individual". Oyange-Ngando's paper cites many sources, but cites none at all for this claim. Modern photos of Maasai show members of the same tribe/clan wearing a wide variety of shúkà patterns, seemingly to taste.) and there historically have long been weaving operations in various African areas, most shúkà today that are not mass-manufactured in Dar es Salaam or Mombasa actually come from China, not Africa.

=== East and South Asia ===
The earliest-discovered tartan fabric in the world was discovered in Western China, in the context of the Tarim mummies, dated to c. 2100 BC through the first centuries BC. Today, tartan is still woven in China, both as a traditional fabric and in large commercial quantities for export.

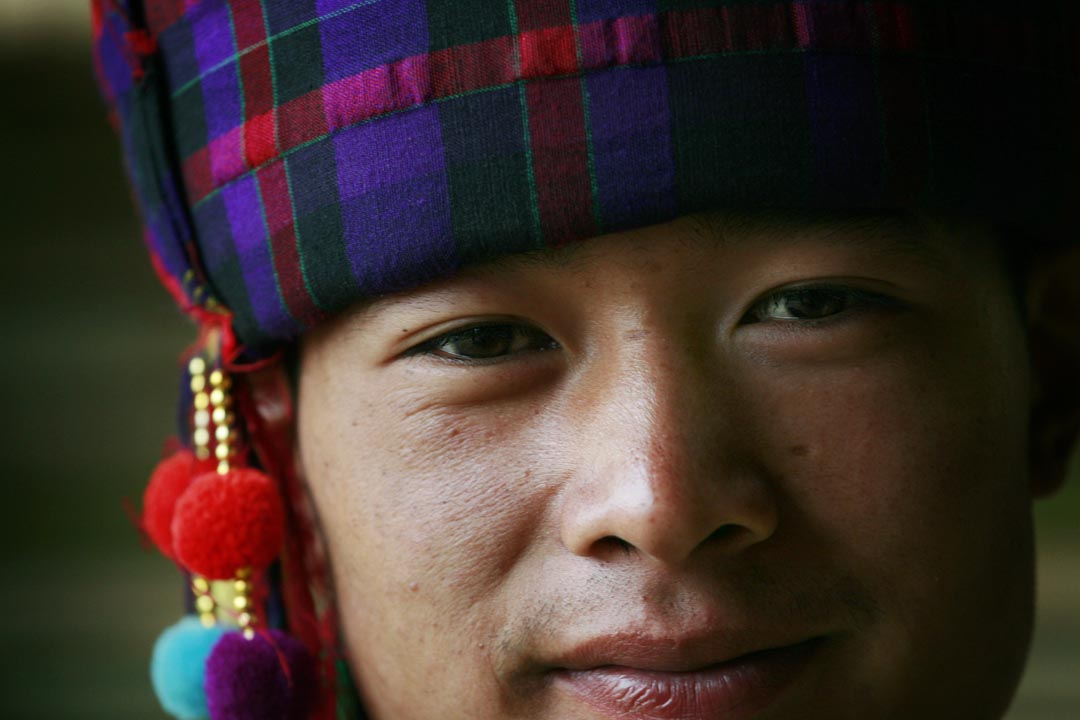
Chinese man in traditional hat of silk tartan with wool pompons, 2008

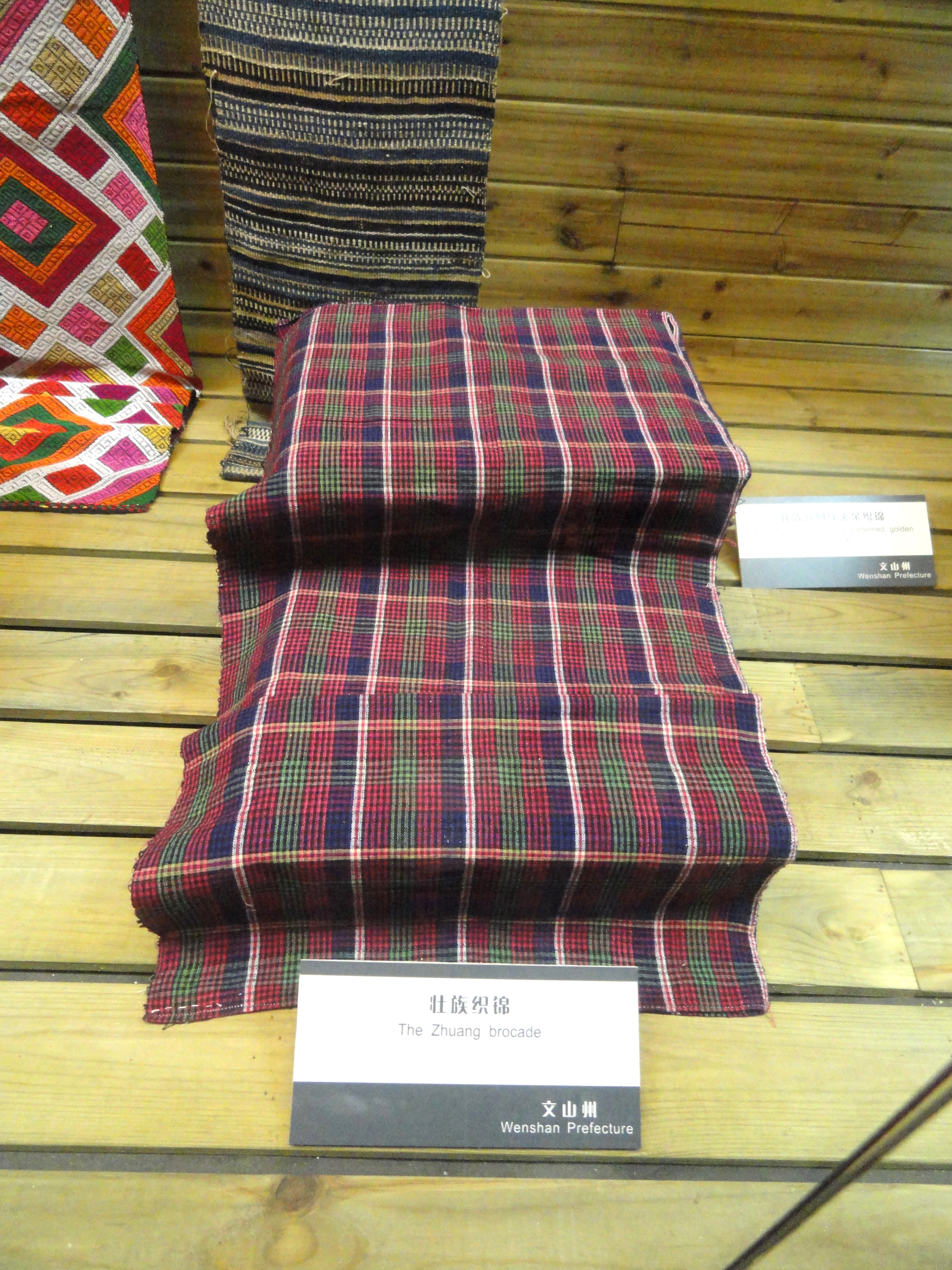
Historical brocade of the Zhuang people in Yunnan, China (photo 2011). It is often very complex material, but sometimes simple tartan like this.

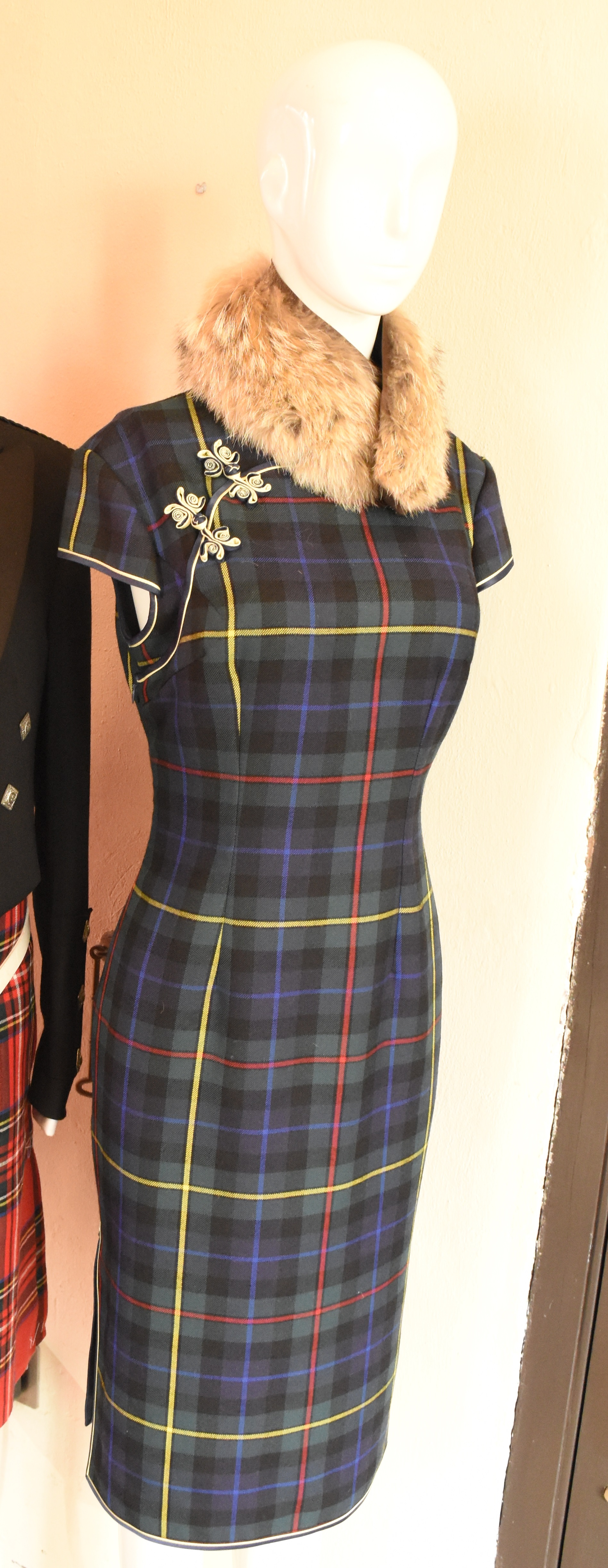
A tartan cheongsam (qipao) at a Hong Kong clothier in 2021

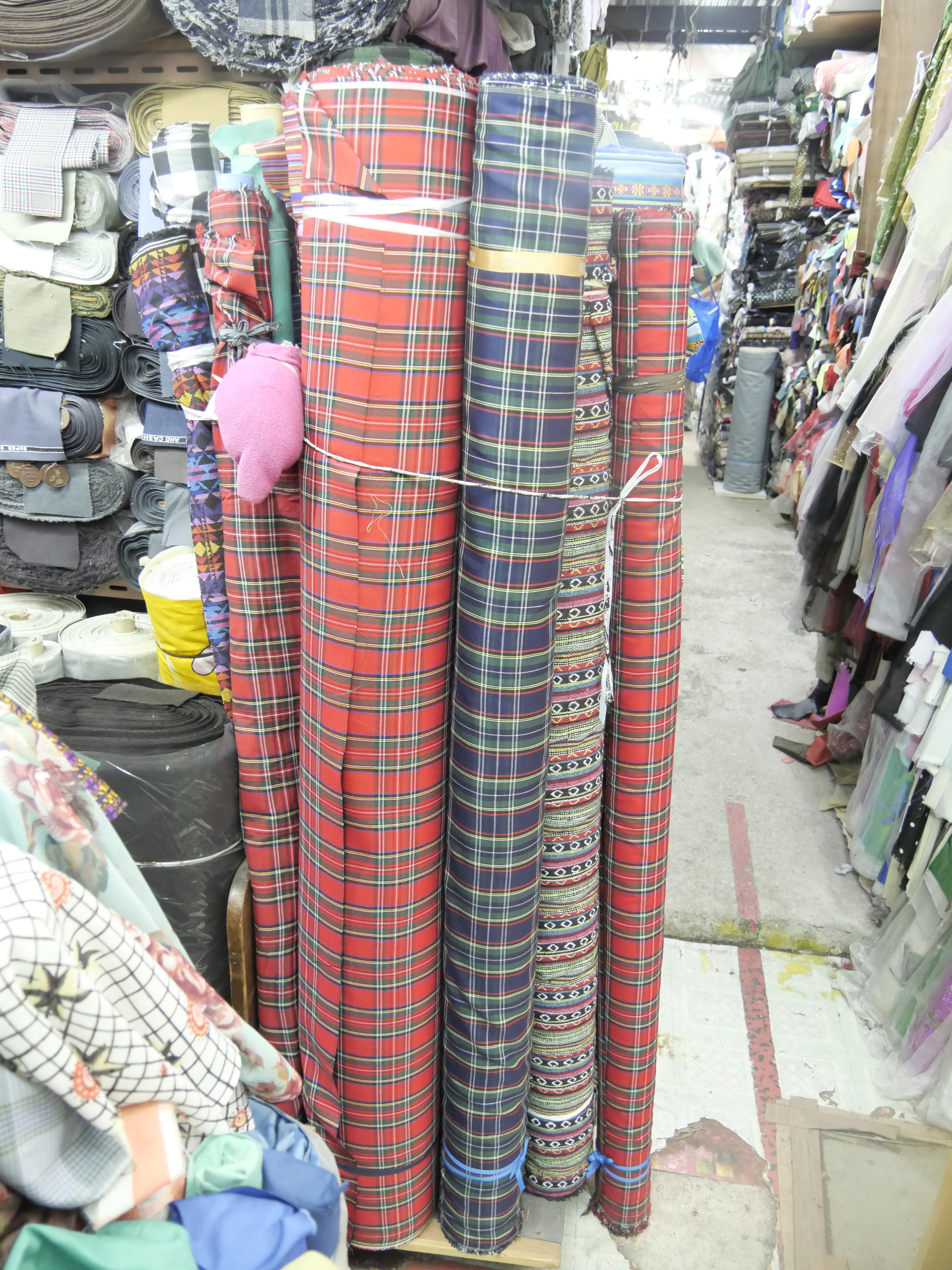
Tartan and other textiles for sale in bulk at Yen Chow Street Hawker Bazaar, Hong Kong, 2022

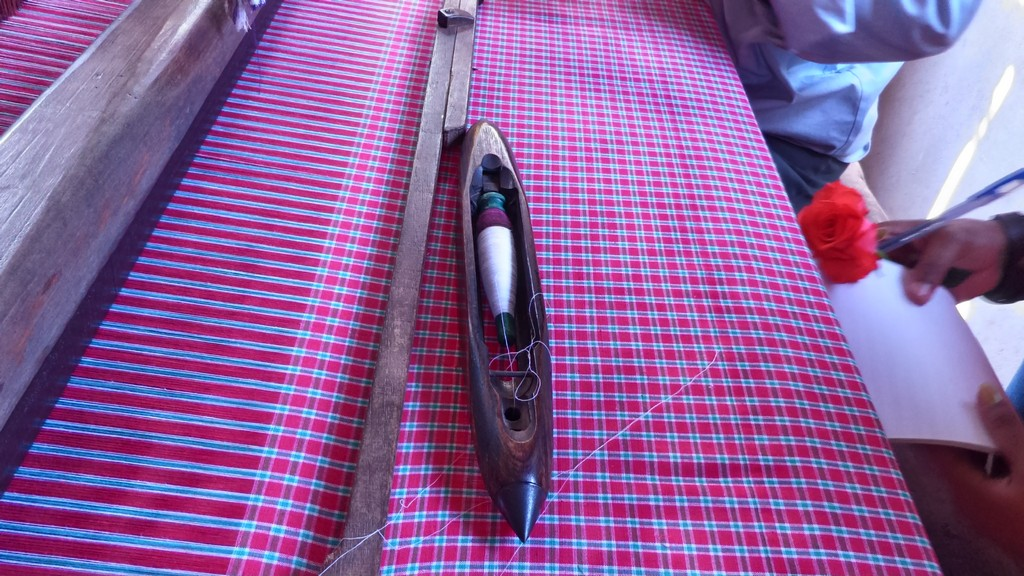
A simple three-colour tartan pattern being woven on a hand loom in Pilikula heritage village, India, 2016

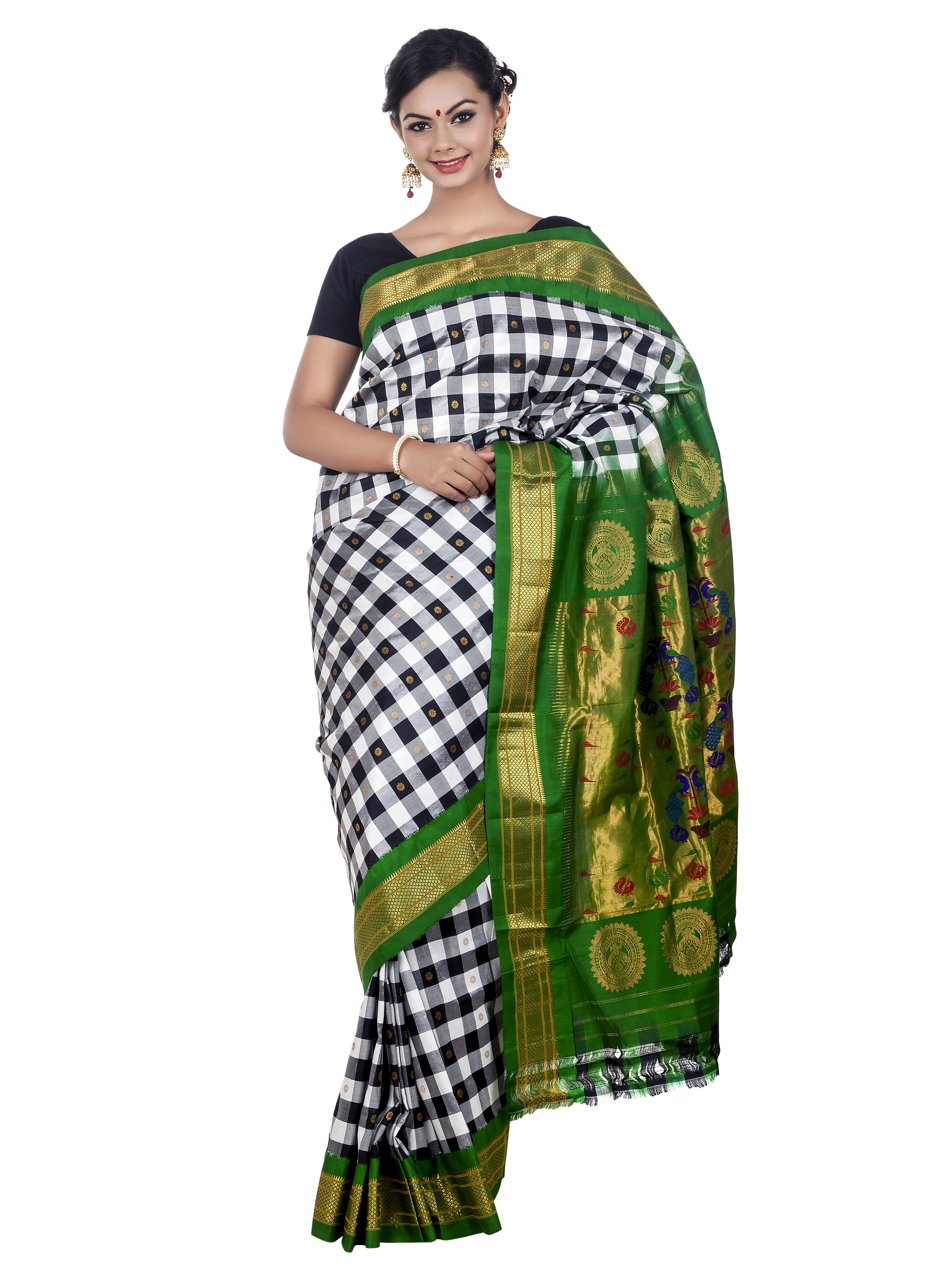
Indian sari in a two-colour tartan pattern with highlights at the crossings of the black lines, which may be embroidery or supplementary weaving

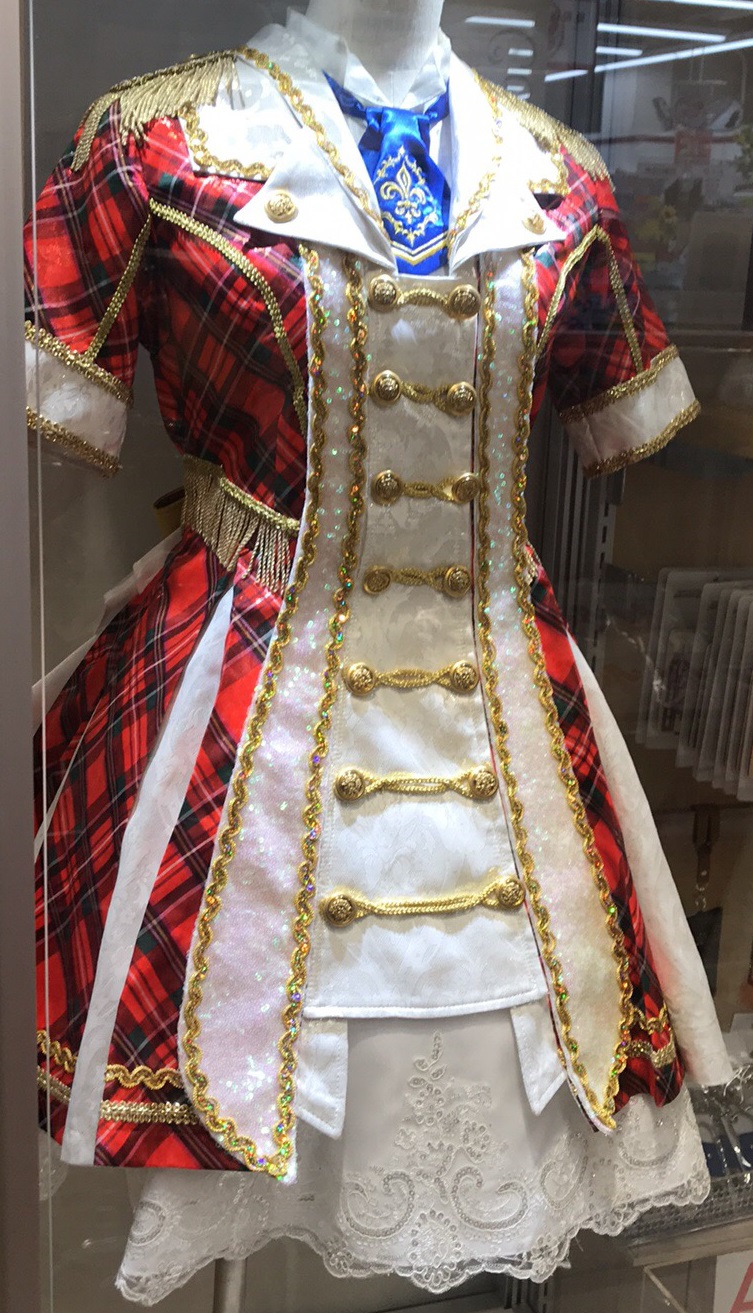
A modern, elaborate kōshijima dress from Japan's lolita fashion subculture, 2018

==== Bhutanese mathra ====
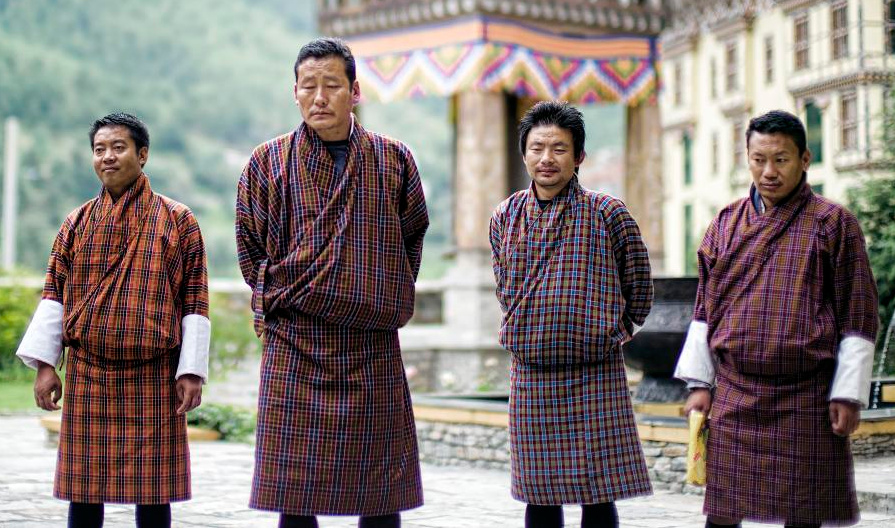
Four Bhutanese men, 2012, in gho robes, with four different mathra patterns, from very narrow to quite broad

In Bhutan, traditional men's robes (gho) and knee-stockings (omso, similar to argyle socks), and women's dresses (kira) are traditional national costume styles that are largely mandatory for public dress since 1963. (Note: They are prescribed dress in at least in the more populous places. Remote areas, inhabited largely by ethnic minorities, still exhibit local traditional dress norms that differ from area to area.) Tartan (generally called mathra or, after the district of its primary production, Bumthang mathra, (Note: Just Bumthang by itself is a term for a type of woolen cloth, regardless of pattern.) among other names for specific patterns) is among the many common textile styles for these garments, some much more elaborate (generally called yathra) than tartan. The tartan cloths are woven traditionally in yak and sheep wool, but today also in cotton and raw silk.

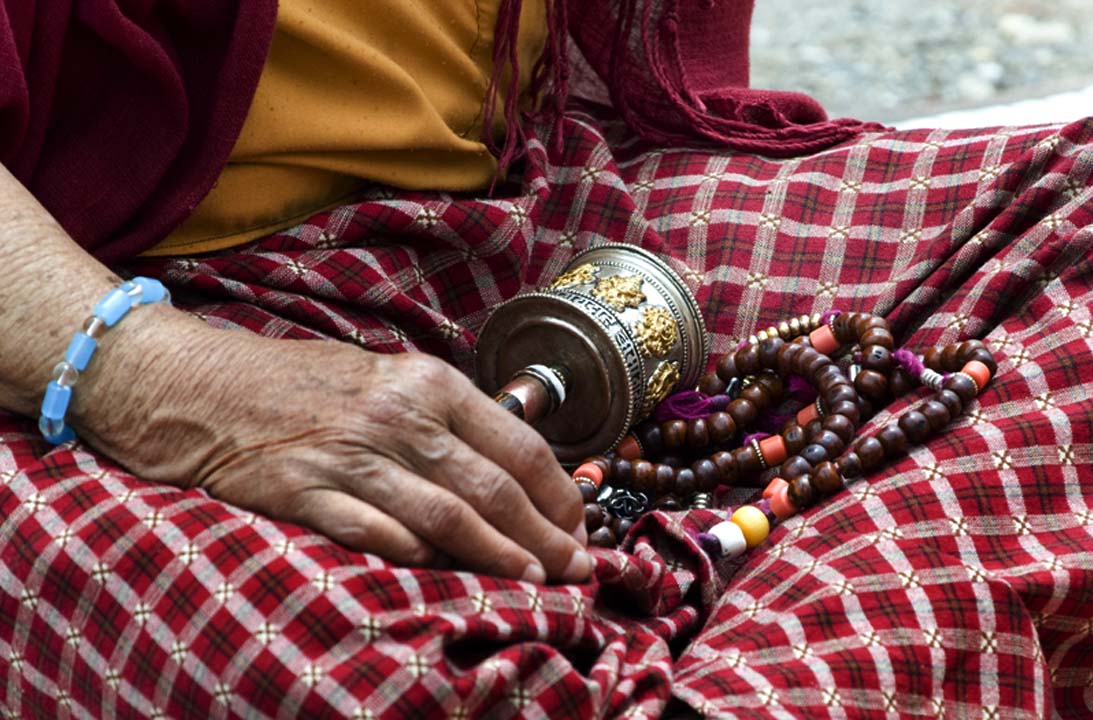
Gira dress featuring "X" patterns where the white stripes meet, produced by supplementary weaving

Mathra is woven primarily with a red ground. Some specific tartan/plaid styles of Bhutan are: broad-checked thra bom; narrow-checked thra charuru; sethra ('golden pattern'), an orange or rust ground with yellow and sometimes black checks (with black, it is more specifically called sethra dokhana, and without, dalapgi sethra); red, blue, and black patterns on a white ground, in at least four varieties called pangtsi (specifically red and black on white), Decheling kamtham, and other names; and another style is named burai mathra. Some of these fabrics feature supplementary weft decorative patterns (flowers, etc.) added to the tartan, with an embroidered or brocaded appearance, generally called pesar ('new pattern'); one such style is more specifically called sethra metho chen, the yellow-orange pattern with flowers added. There are also patterns of simple linear stripes that do not cross each other (generally called adha[ng] mathra or aikapur), with various names for specific styles.

==== Indian madras ====
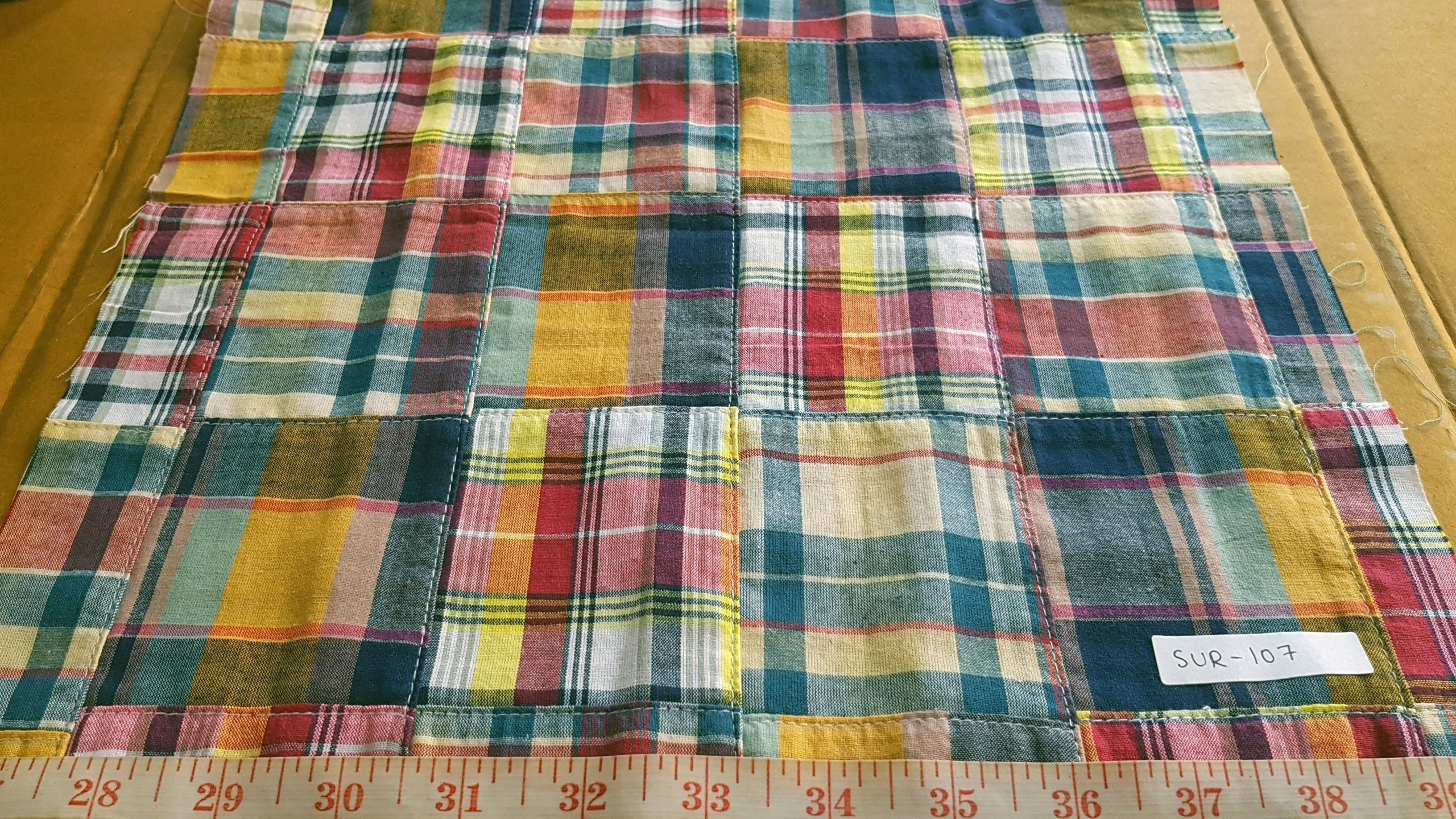
Samples of tartan madras cloth, showing its muted look

Madras is a patterned, light-weight, breatheable, cotton cloth named for the Madras (now Chennai) area of India. Traditional madras is hand-woven from lumpy, carded-cotton thread, and coloured with natural dyes which may bleed together upon washing to create a more muted pattern than typical tartan, as well as a rougher texture. Madras also has a "softer" look because it typically lacks the black lines found in most Scottish tartans. Madras cloth dates to at least the 16th century, produced in a variety of patterns, including religious designs and floral prints. It is unclear if tartan patterns were among the original designs, though they became very popular later. Weaving, primarily for export, in Madras/Chennai became a large-scale commercial enterprise after the British East India Company came to control the area in the mid-17th century. Major production of this style of cloth also took place in Cambay State (present-day Gujarat).

Madras, ideal for warm-weather wear, became popular in the Philippines (where it is known as cambaya) and the Caribbean; mainly in undyed form, it was also exported to Europe. Tartan madras reached America by 1718, and appeared in the 1897 Sears catalogue. It was popular in the United States in the 1930s and again in the 1960s, often associated with preppy style. Substantial export of the cloth to South Africa began in 1958.

Modern madras cloth is commonly in tartan patterns, but also simply striped (seersucker). Unlike Scottish-style tartan, madras is not woven in 2/2 twill pattern, but is a muslin of plain weave; it thus, when viewed up close, features a "pepper and salt" colour mixture where colours cross (a dot matrix, technically), not staggered diagonal lines. It also usually lacks black lines.

==== Japanese kōshi ====
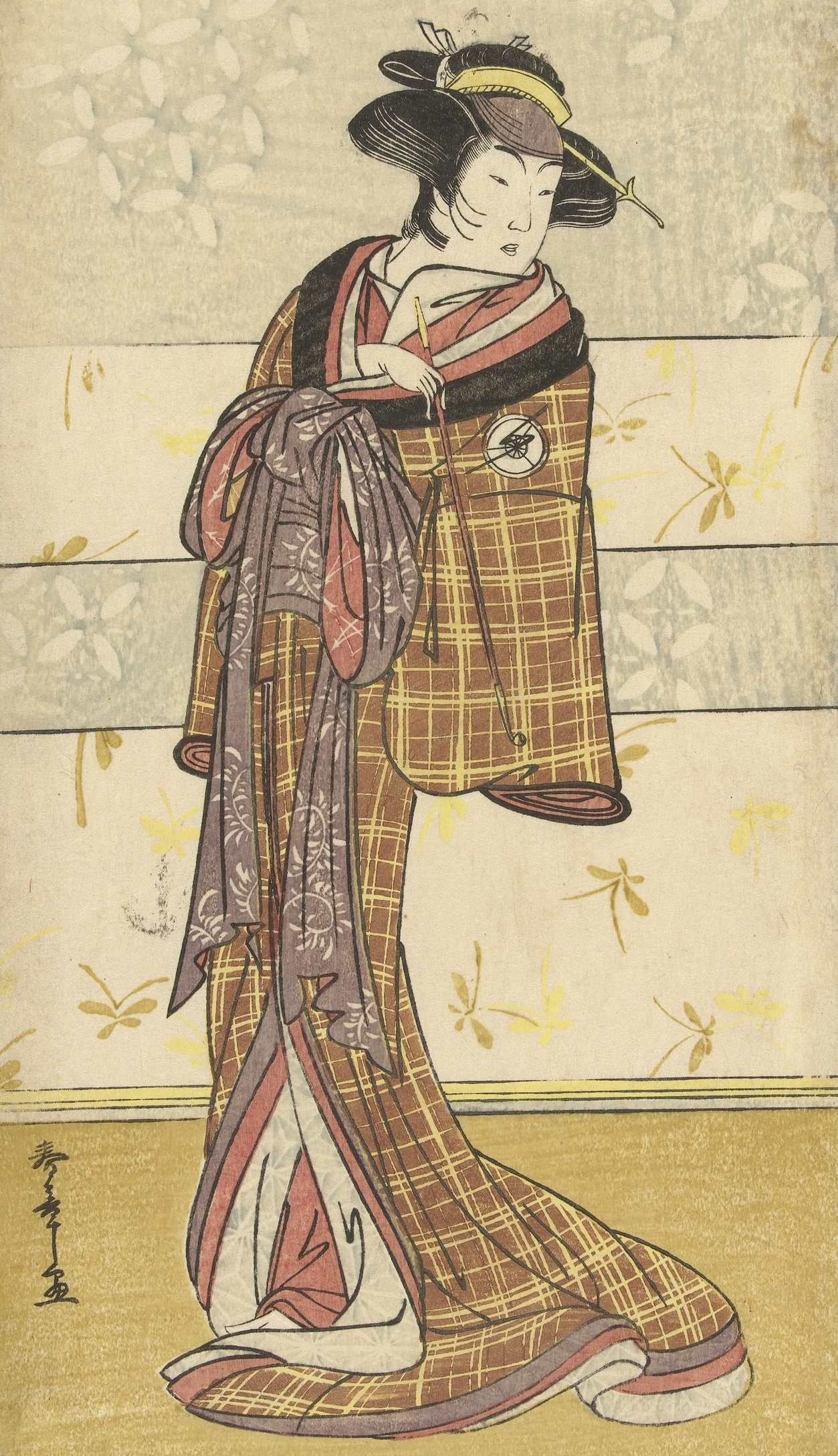
Woodcut image of Japanese kabuki actor Iwai Hanshiro IV dressed in kōshi, 1780s

In Japan, tartan patterns called kōshi 格子 (also koushi or goushi, literally 'lattice') or kōshijima 格子縞 date back to at least the 18th century, possibly the 17th in the Edo period (1603–1867), and were popular for kabuki theatrical costuming, which inspired general public use by both sexes, for the kosode (precursor of the kimono), the obi, and other garments. The name is a reference to the details of shoji room dividers, the grid pattern said to stand for strength, with larger stripes representing more power. Kōshi range from simple checked patterns to complex multi-colour weaves. Ikat thread-dyeing techniques were sometimes employed before the weaving, such that a colour in the pattern was mottled, and parts of the design may sometimes have been embroidered, supplementary-woven, or dyed-over for additional highlight or contrast. Some styles have particular names, such as misuji-kōshi ('three-striped lattice') and futasuji-kōshi ('forked lattice'). A pattern with larger squares is more generally called ogoshi or with smaller squares kogoshi.

It is unclear whether there was a Scottish tartan influence on the development of kōshi. The Edo period pre-dates the Perry Expedition of 1853–1854 and its opening of Japan to general Western trade, but mostly post-dates early European contact from 1543 to the closure of Japan to outsiders in 1639 under the sakoku isolationist policy.

Nothing suggests that particular patterns have been associated with specific families or Japanese clans.

Today, kōshijima is the general Japanese word for 'tartan/plaid, checked pattern'. Tartan is popular in present-day Japan, both for high fashion and for streetwear, as well as school uniforms. Since the 1960s, the Japanese department store chain Isetan has used an emblematic tartan as a marketing tool (e.g. on all its shopping bags); the pattern is based on some MacMillan tartans. Japan hosted a major museum exhibit about tartan in 2018.

=== Eastern Europe to Western Asia ===
Tartan-style patterns are common throughout Southeastern Europe.

John Francis Campbell (1862) described the native weaving of the Sámi (Lapps) of northern Europe as being hand-loom tartan.

Considerably to the southeast, the Tatars (Note: Not to be confused with the Mongols, who were called "Ta[r]tars" by medieval Europeans, and supplied patterned cloth among other trade goods.) and Chuvash, Turkic peoples of Tatarstan and Chuvashia, respectively, in the Russian Federation, have worn tartan, striped, and other patterns since at least the 19th century.

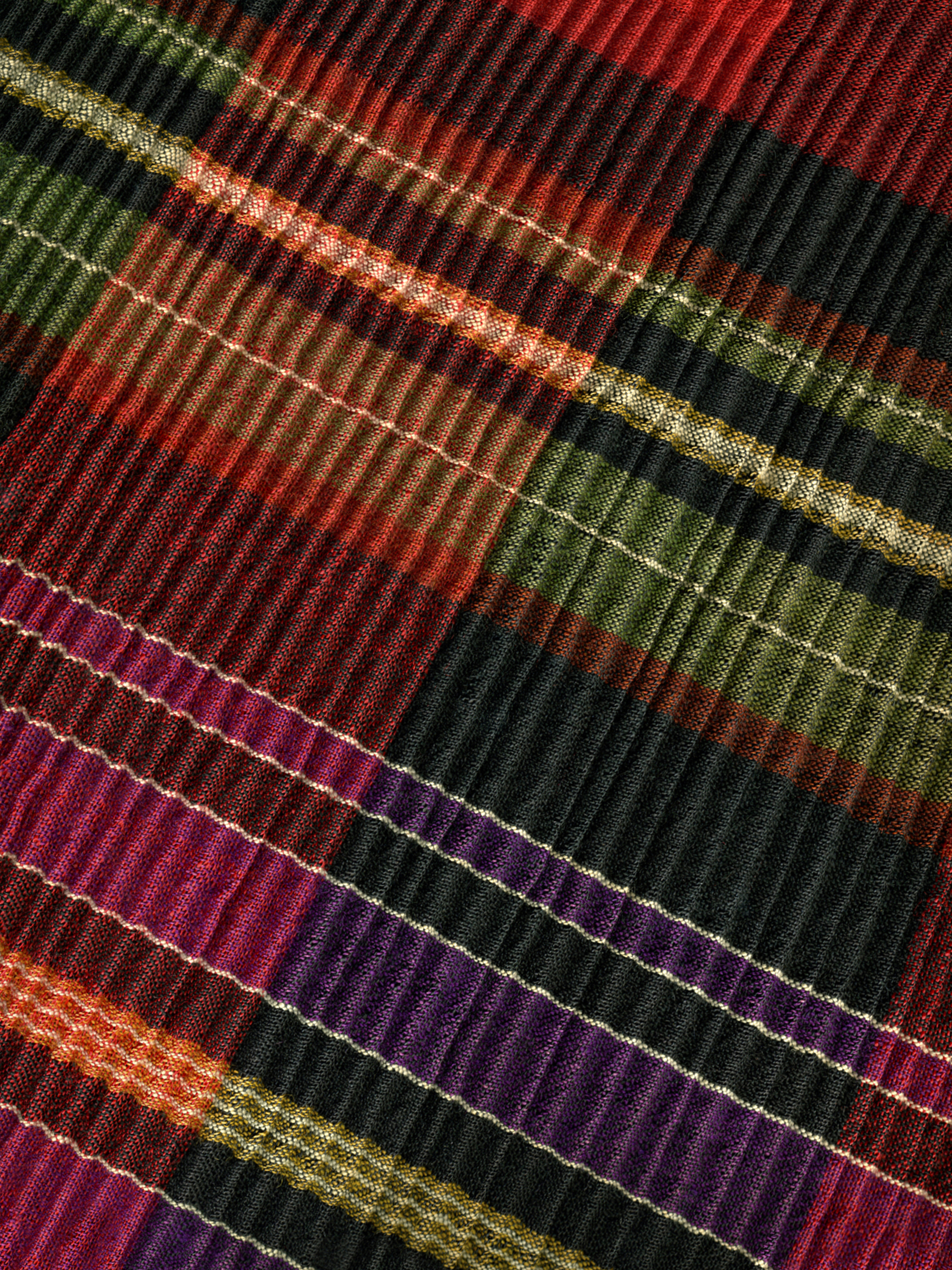
Detail of Serbian tartan folk dress, densely pleated, 2017

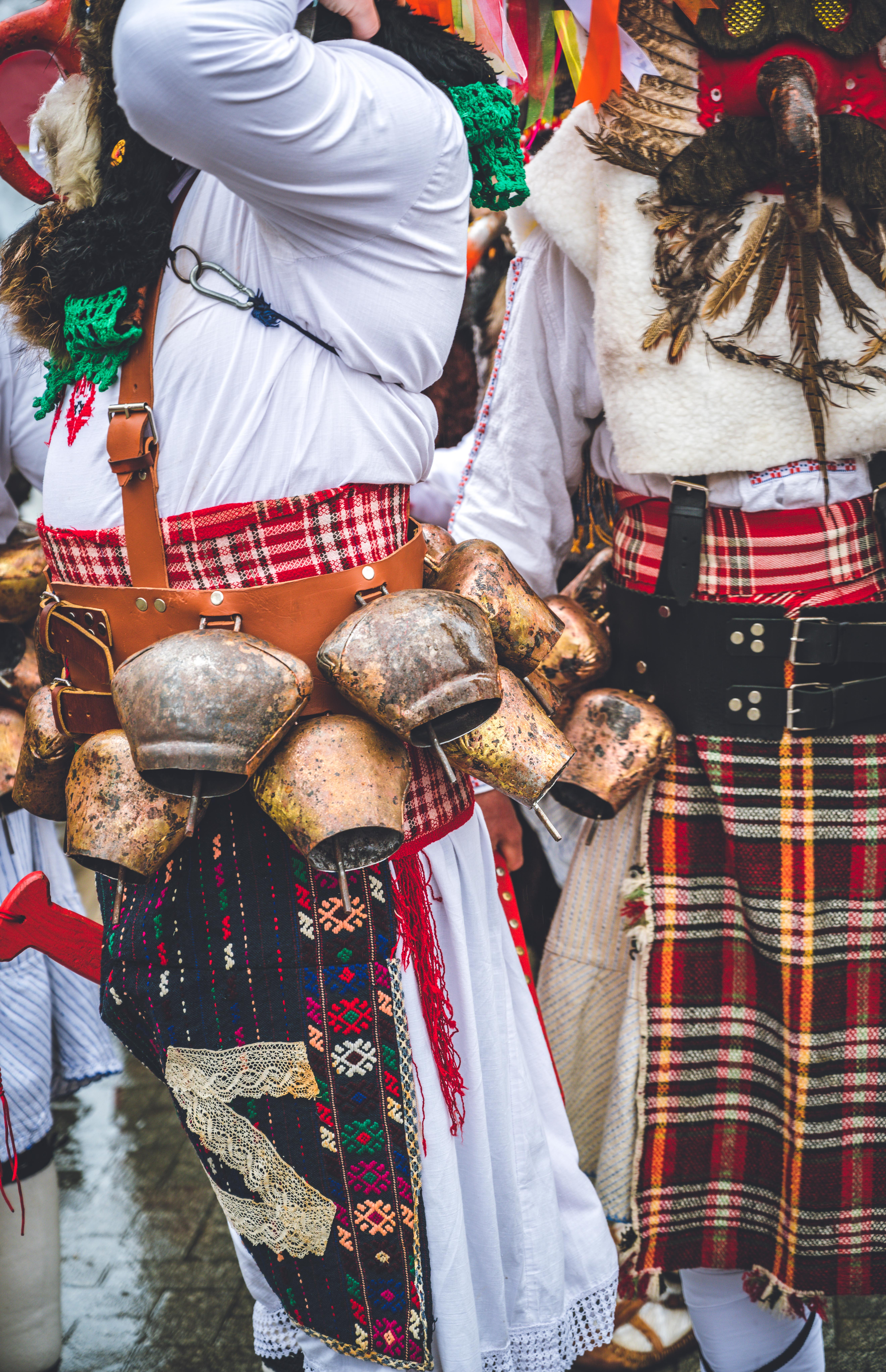
Tartan patterns used in a Bulgarian folk costume

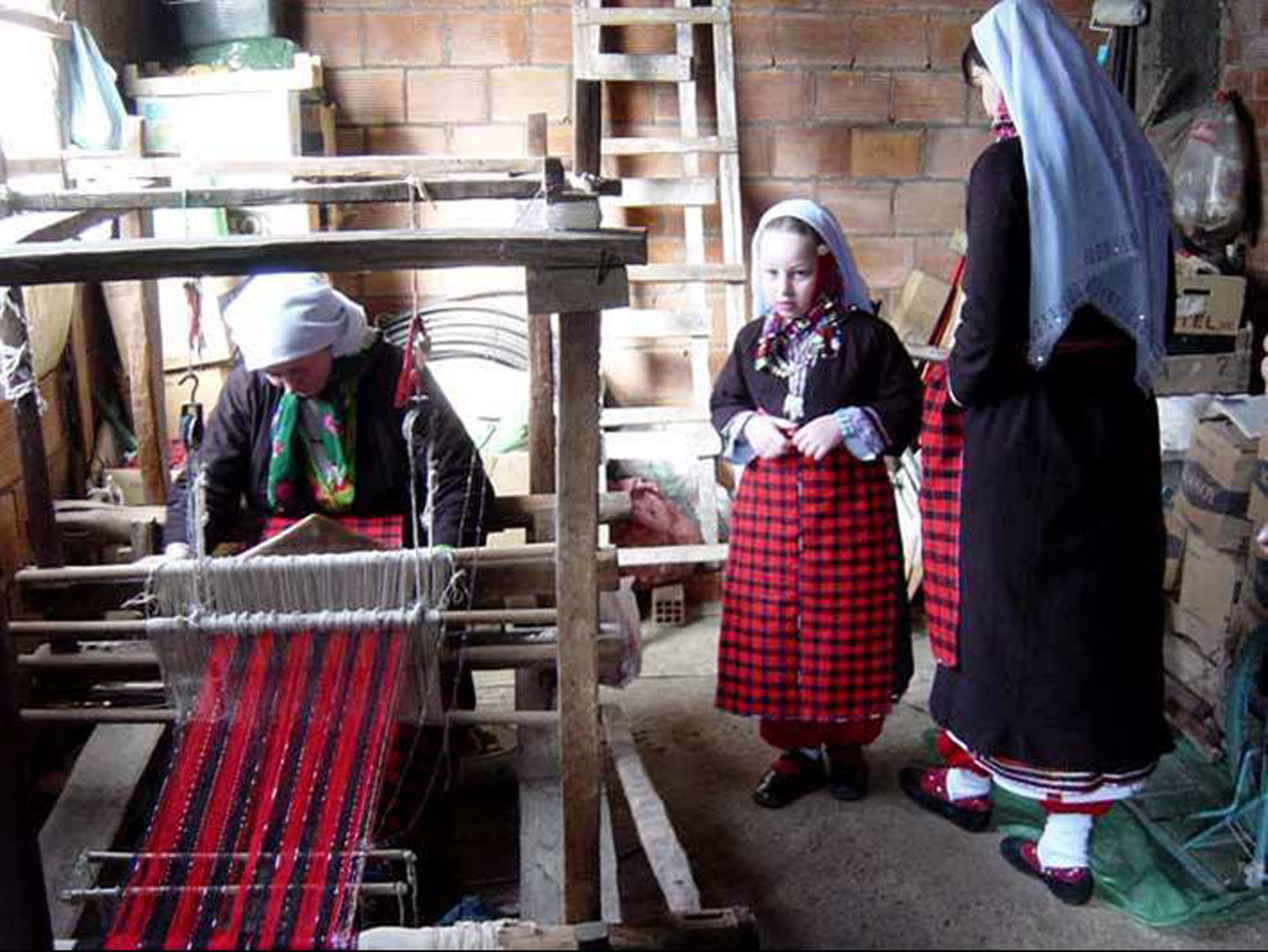
Simple shepherd's check tartan being woven by Pomaks in Greece, 2007

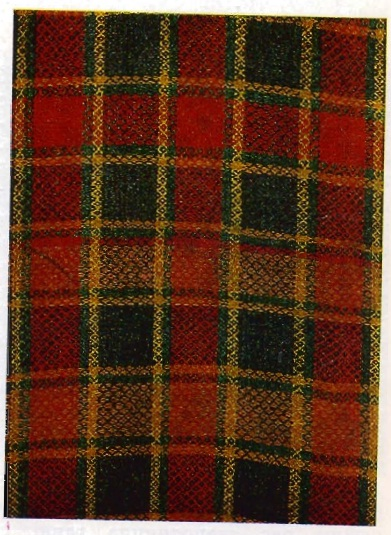
Example of 1920s tartan cloth from Belarus, in a complex non-twill damask weave

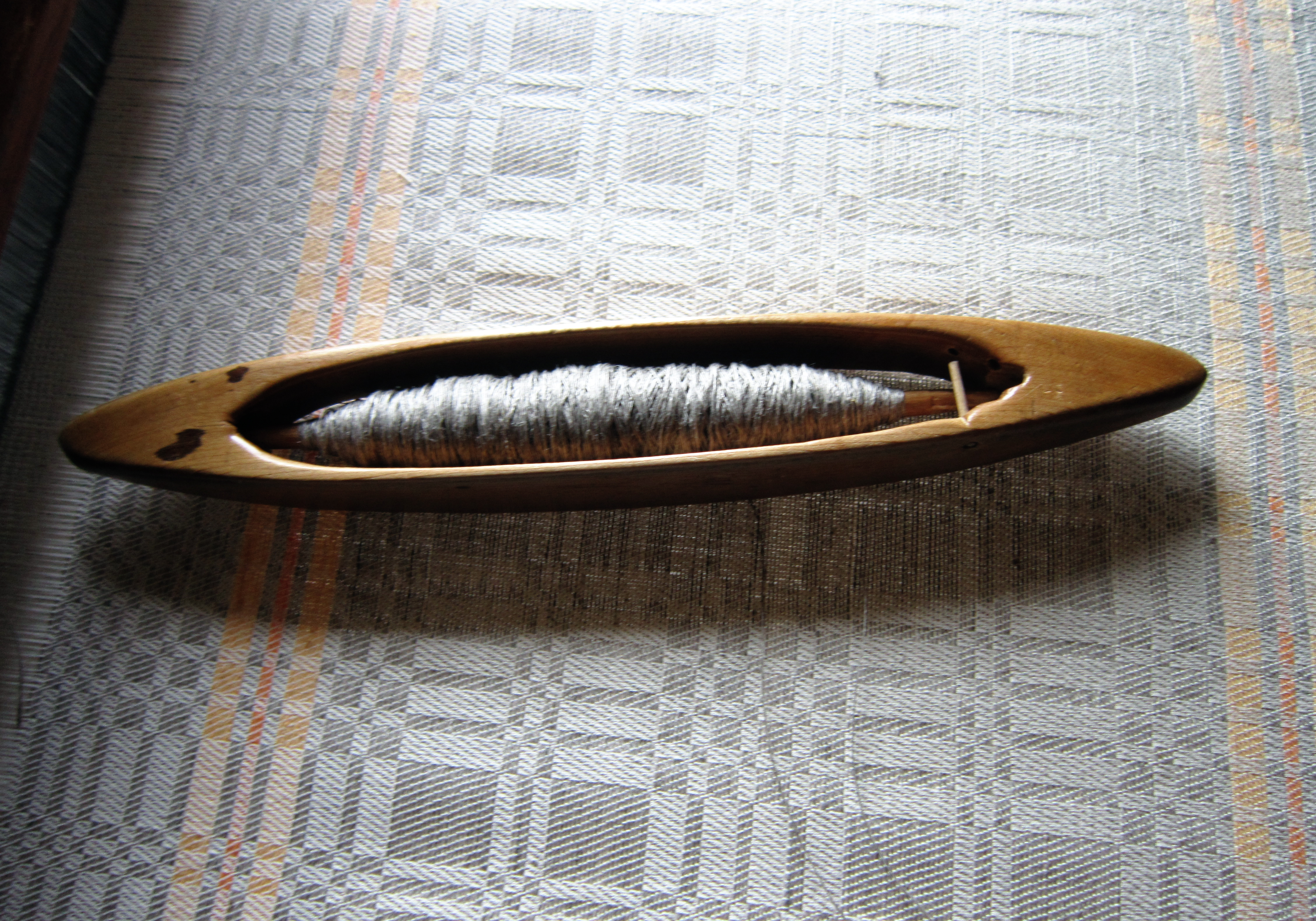
Silk tartan cloth of white, grey, and golden thread from Lithuania

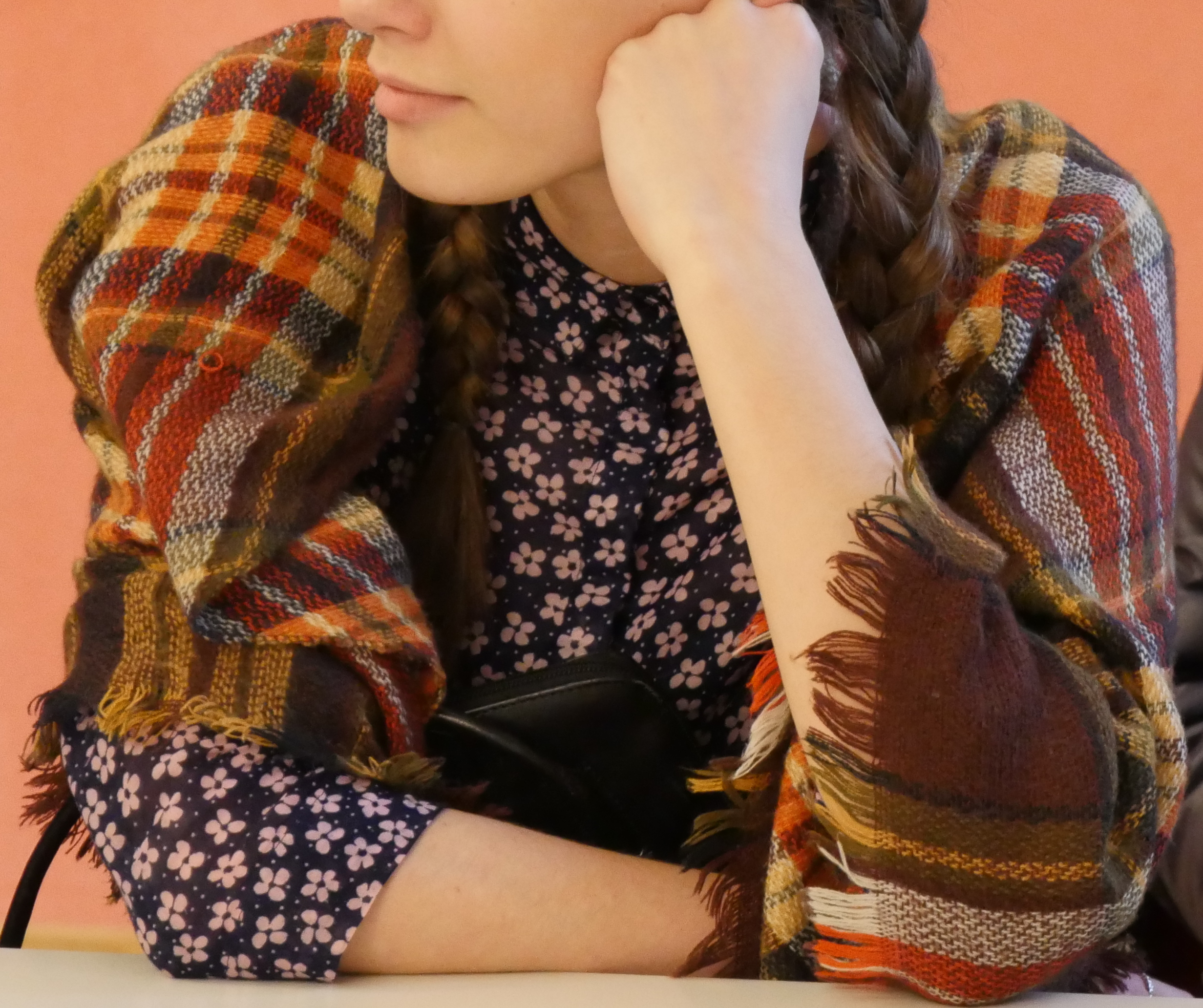
Estonian woman wearing a tartan suurrätt (plaid/shawl)

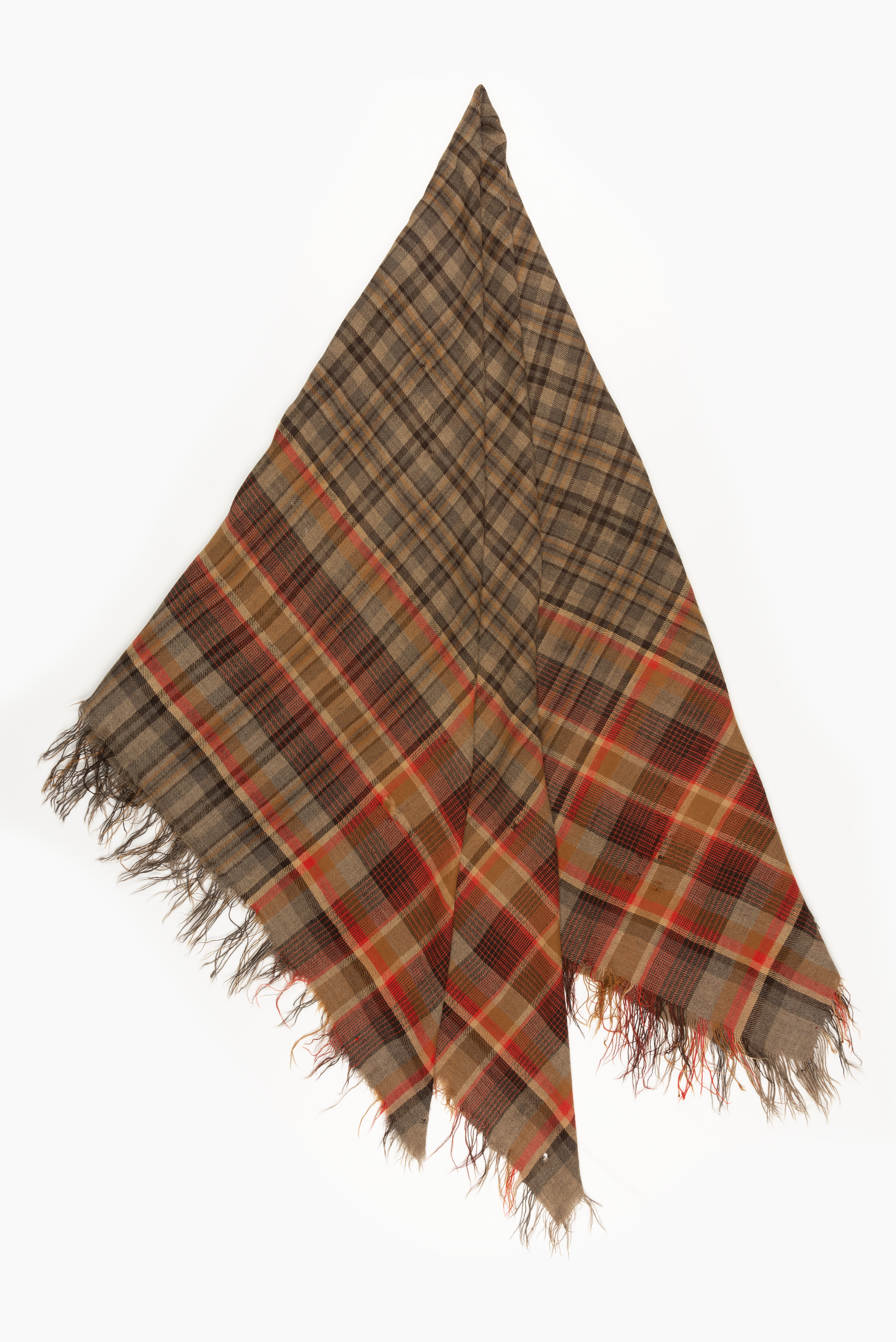
Another Estonian suurrätt, with a total-border pattern of more complexity than the simple central pattern

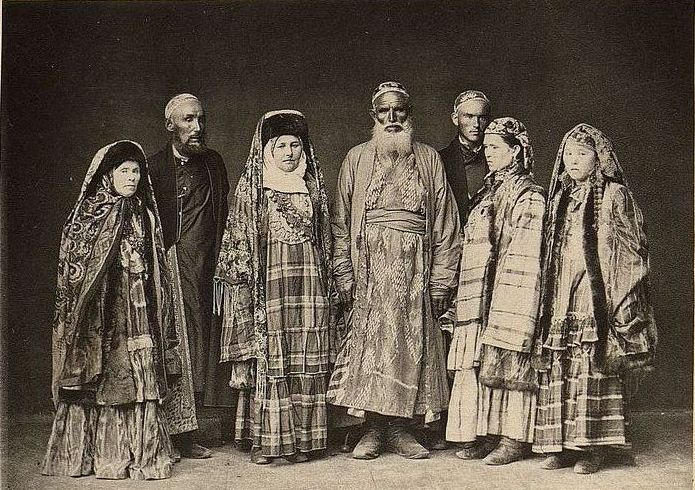
Tatars in Kazan in 1870, wearing tartan, stripes, and other patterns

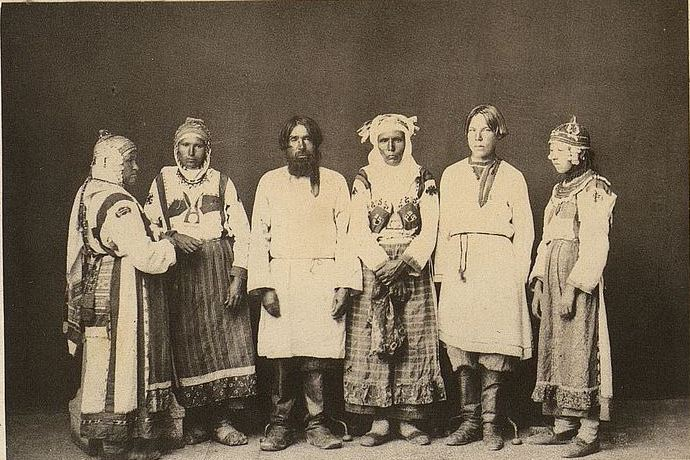
Chuvashian example, c. 1870

==== Russian shotlandka ====
Robert Jamieson, writing in 1818 as editor of Edmund Burt's 1727–1737 Letters of a Gentleman in the North of Scotland, said that in his era, married women of the north-western provinces of Russia wore tartan plaids "of massy silk, richly varied, with broad cross-bars of gold and silver tissue". This seems quite distinct from Scottish-style construction.

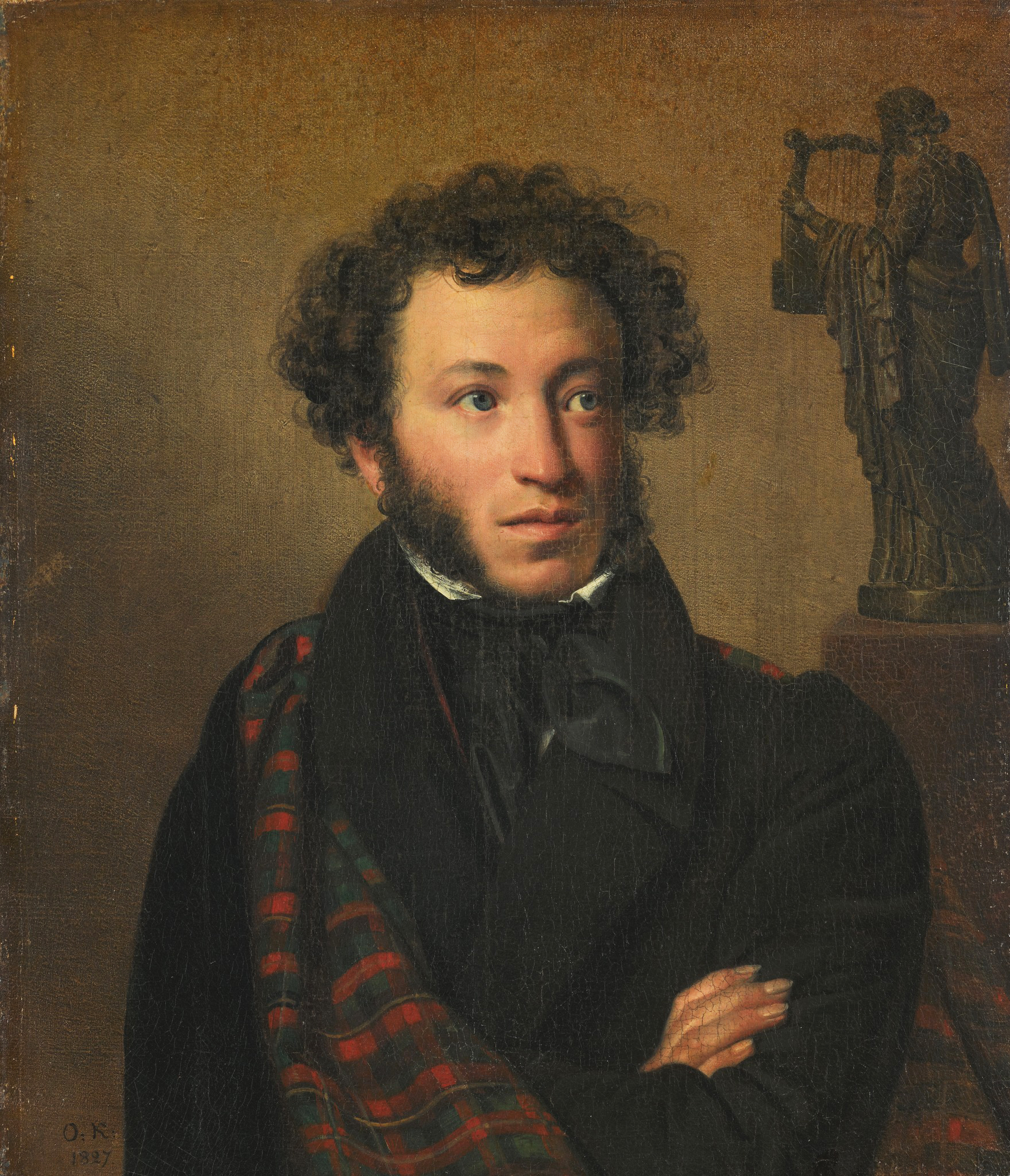
Alexander Pushkin wearing a tartan cape; by Orest Kiprensky, 1827

The Russian poet Alexander Pushkin (1799–1837), who was influenced by the romantic-Highlands writings of Walter Scott, posed for one of the most famous paintings in Russia, the 1827 portrait by Orest Kiprensky. Pushkin wears what looks at first like a Scottish-style tartan shoulder plaid, but is more probably a sleeveless "Almaviva" cape/cloak, a style in fashion at the time and known to have been worn by Pushkin.

Tartan was commented on in the Moscow Telegraph in 1826 as being in broad fashion in the city for all sorts of garments (often as a decorative accent). Scottish-style plaids apparently did come into some fashion in Russia as women's wear for a space during the mid-to-late 19th century, a style picked up from stage productions; some 19th-century Russian paintings illustrate use of plaids as shawls. Tartan (and plain-striped) shawls were also common among the Volga Germans and Bessarabia Germans in Russia; a mixture of hand-woven (originally as bedclothes and other household goods) and mass-produced in Russia, the shawls became emblematic of the German-from-Russia diaspora in North and South America from the nineteenth century to the mid-20th.

Around the end of the 19th century, the Russian equivalent of Regency and Victorian British tartanware objects, such as decorative Fedoskino boxes with tartan accents in a style called Shotlandka Шотландка (literally 'Scotlandish'), were produced by companies like the Lukutin Manufactory on the outskirts of Moscow.

Today, shotlandka or shotlandki шотландки are simply Russian words for 'tartan/plaid' generally.

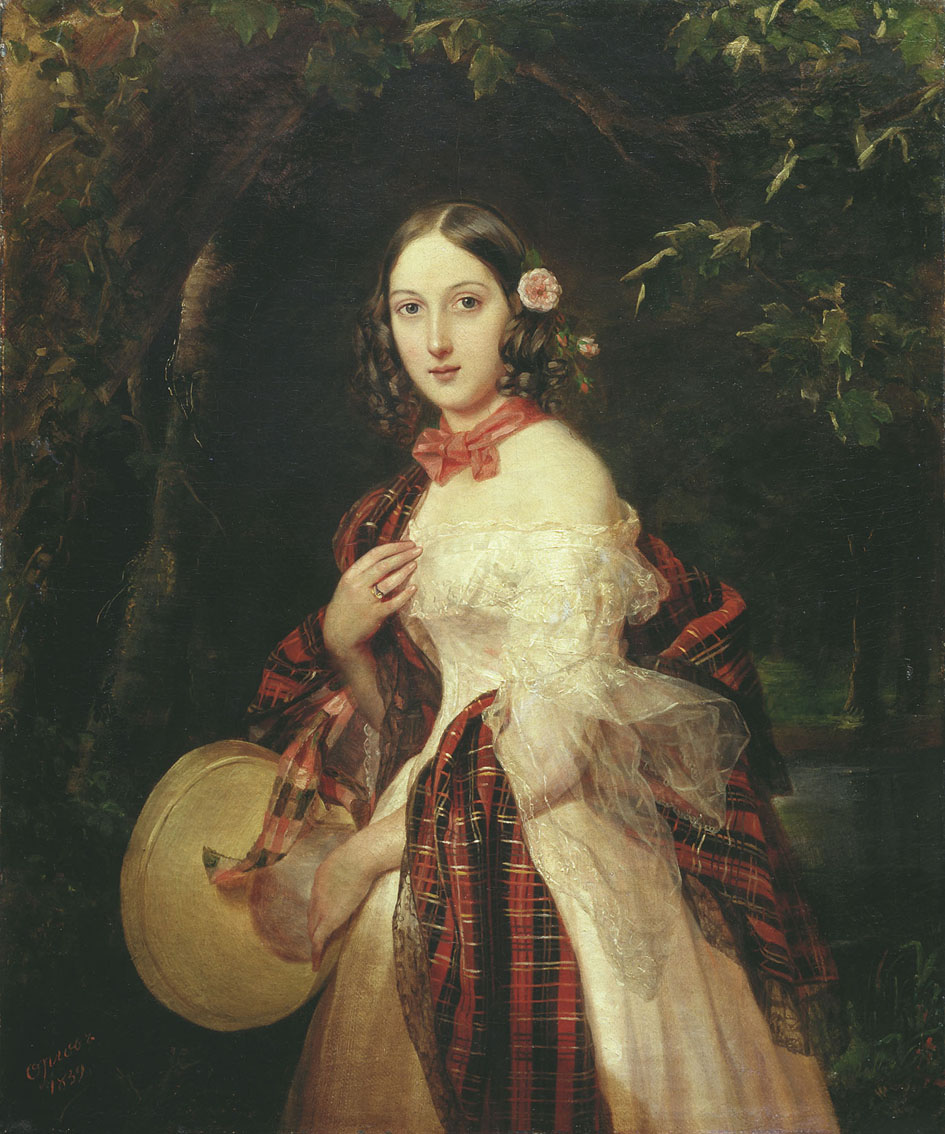
1839 portrait of Maria Arkadievna Bek by Pimen Orlov may illustrate one of the Russian plaids with silver thread

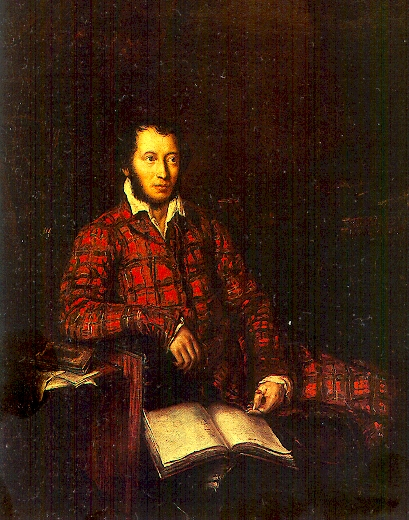
Posthumous portrait of Alexander Pushkin by Carl Peter Mazer, 1839, shows him in a red and green tartan dressing gown

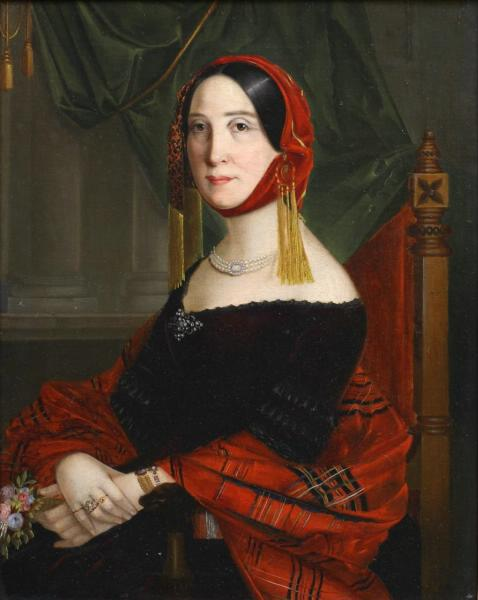
Tatyana Petrovna Musina-Pushkina, Princess Kropotkina (1800–1865), portrait c. 1840s by unknown artist

=== Oceania ===
==== Adoption by the Māori ====
Pōtatau Te Wherowhero, the first Māori king, adopted a particular house tartan with design elements symbolizing his ancestry, such as inner stripes representing migration canoes that first arrived in Aotearoa New Zealand; this tartan was presented by his descendant Tūheitia Paki to Charles III in the former's visit to Buckingham Palace in May 2023. His following tribes concentrated around Northland have also adopted green tartans.

== See also ==
- Drugget, a coarse and often linearly striped cloth that was common in the Scottish Western Isles
- Flannel, a type of fuzzy cloth often produced in a tartan pattern
- Hodden, a non-tartan cloth of undyed wool, sometimes also used for kilts, especially for non-Scottish pipe bands
- List of tartans
- Mackinaw cloth, a dense woollen cloth often produced in tartan patterns
- Madras (cloth), cotton cloth of India often woven in tartan patterns
- Tartan Day, a day of celebration, in Canada, Australia, the US, and some other countries, recognising the influence of Scottish immigration
- Tartanry

=== Patterns ===
- Argyle (pattern)
- Battenburg markings, a check (dicing) pattern used on UK emergency vehicles
- Border tartan
- Check (pattern) or chequer
- Gingham (Vichy check)
- Glen plaid
- Harlequin print
- Herringbone (cloth)
- Houndstooth
- Sillitoe tartan, a check (dicing, not actually tartan) pattern commonly used on police headgear
- Tattersall (cloth)
