= Irish clothing =

Clothing culture in Ireland

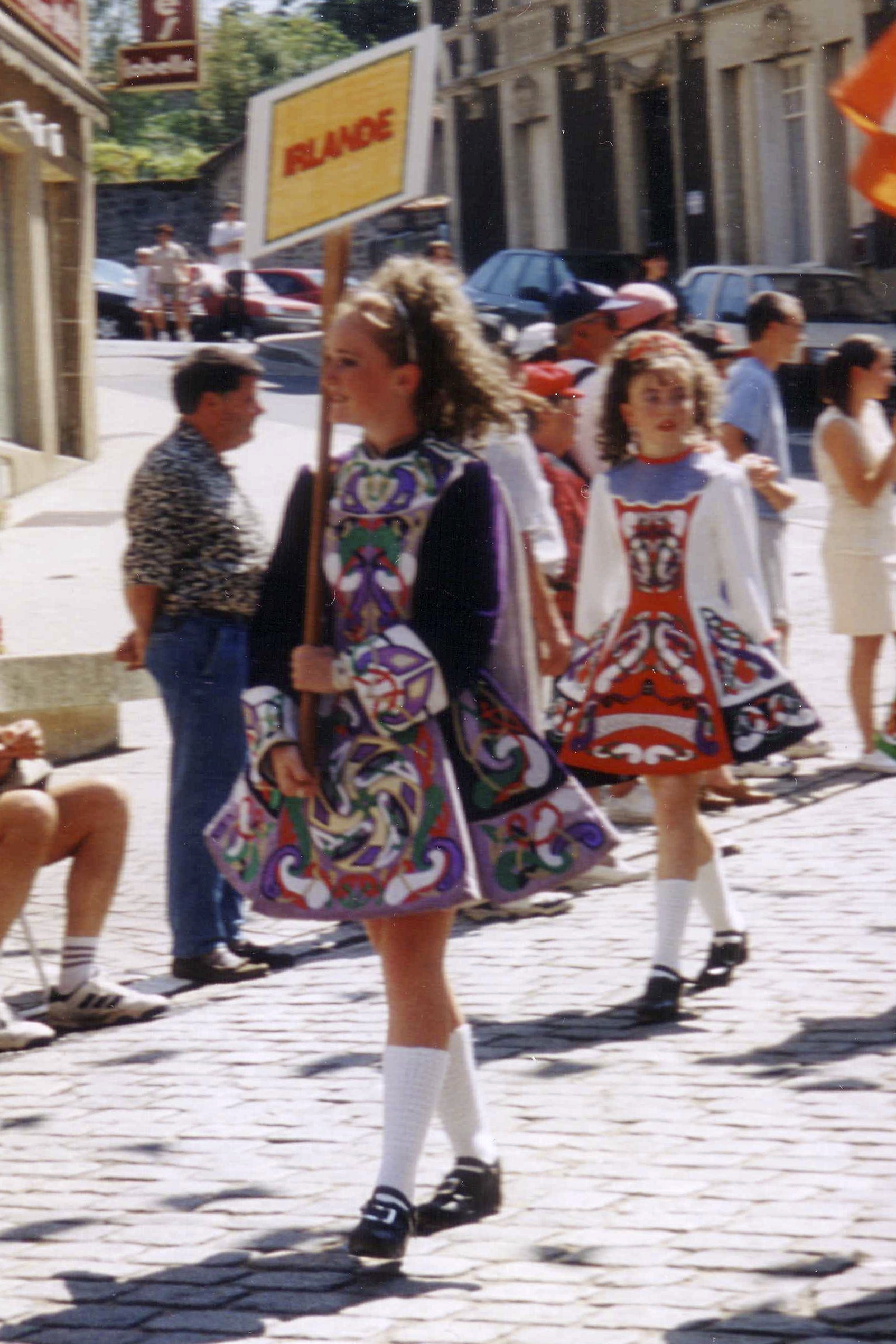
Irish dancers in traditional costumes at the Festival de Confolens in France, 1998

Traditional Irish clothing is the traditional attire which would have been worn historically by Irish people in Ireland. Such clothing among the men included the léine, brat and triúbhas, while the women wore the leine, brat and gúna. These were the traditional items for centuries and are still worn today by a small number of enthusiasts. However, there has been a considerable transformation of Irish clothing, that incorporates new techniques and materials that make up Modern Irish clothing.

== History ==
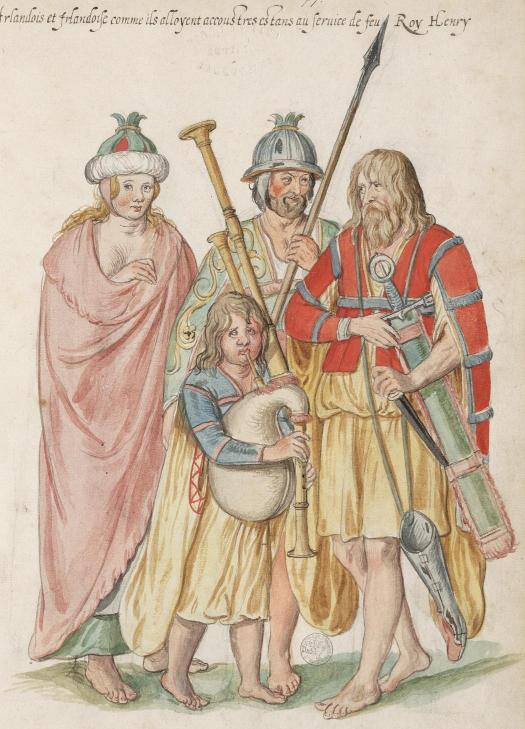
Dutch watercolour (c. 1575) of "Irish in the service of the late king Henry (VIII)" depicting a léine.

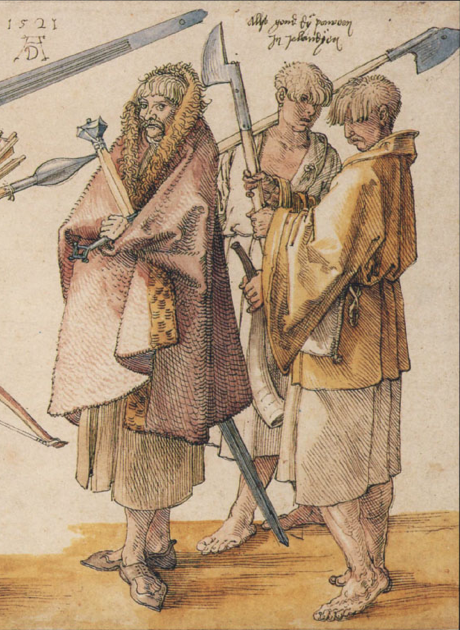
Three Irish Kerns depicted by Albrecht Dürer in 1521.

Little is known about Irish apparel before the twelfth century. Historians believe that the early inhabitants of Ireland dressed in wool cloth, although some argue that garments made of animal skins were more prevalent. By the thirteenth century, the Irish were bundling themselves in mantles, which are coats made of wool cloth. Mantles were composed of wool but occasionally of animal skins. Beneath the brat (pl. bratanna), they wore léinte (sing. léine), long linen tunics that extended to the ground but were gathered into pleats and belted so that they fell to the knees (the excess material was allowed to hang down at the waist and cover the belt, as can be seen in the Dutch painting illustration). The léine was very wide at the bottom and narrow on top. Likewise, the léine's sleeves were narrow at the upper arms but widened greatly at the elbows. The sleeves were open to allow the lower arm to emerge, but hung down behind the elbow to the knee or sometimes as far as the ground. Léinte were saffron-yellow (léine croich 'saffron shirt'). The léine was worn throughout Gaelic culture, including in western Scotland, up until the late 16th century. In Ireland, traditional Gaelic dress, including the léine, was banned by the Dublin Castle administration.

Another garment, known as an ionar, was a jacket, pleated at either beneath the breast, or at the waist, with split sleeves. Woodcarvings seem to indicate that inar were richly decorated, possibly through embroidery. In winter, a cota mór was added beneath the brat; this was a greatcoat made of thick wool, with a small standup collar and sleeves that unbuttoned below the elbow to allow the long sleeves of the léine to come through. Less is known of the early apparel of the Irish women and children. It is likely that the earliest female inhabitants of Ireland also donned léinte which looked similar to those of their male counterparts. By the fifteenth century, women were wearing long dresses made from wool cloth, often decorated with ribbons and other accessories.

However, these items were at their height in the medieval period and went into a slow decline after the mid 17th century. During the 16th-century Tudor conquest of Ireland, the Dublin Castle administration prohibited many of Ireland’s clothing traditions. A series of photos captured by French photographers Marguerite Mespoulet and Madeleine Mignon-Alba in 1913 included images of Irish people in later clothing. Some of these photos were taken in Claddagh.

Aran jumpers, commonly thought of as Irish, were invented in the early 20th century and are not regarded as true traditional attire. Contrasting this, Irish Tweed is a woven fabric that has been fashionable for centuries and used for the manufacture of the brat predominantly. An older and warmer fabric suited to the Irish called frieze was associated with the ‘frieze coat’ which also became a term referring to an Irish person until the end of the 19th century. Daniel O’Connell started the Irish fashion movement of wearing a light grey or green frieze coat after he wore a frieze coat in the British Parliament to represent the Irish people when the English dress code was predominantly coloured black. In the past, much weaving was done in the home, with the fabric being delivered to a broker. Today, a few mills exist around Ireland which re-create this tweed in the traditional manner but usually not with Irish wool as was standard in the past. Donegal is the heartland of Irish tweed and Donegal tweed is better known than other Irish tweeds. Later on in the 20th century, fabrication practices became more standardized moving to factory and studio production rather than home production. This allowed for the growth of the Irish fashion industry nationally and then internationally. Many artists were able to experiment with traditional materials and produce unseen silhouettes, and more recently experiment with new environmentally conscious materials. This allowed designers to true to the sustainable Irish identity and expanding its bounds.

Although some developments such as the Aran sweater seem to move away from Irish tradition, there are several notable practices that adhere closer to the origins of tradition. Considering the economic state of Ireland following the Early Modern period, which was “in a poor state” from various factors, the most viable option for the continuance of the industry was to use local materials. These materials like cotton, tweed, and wool pay homage to the historic materials used in fabrication. Furthermore, these materials were a specialty of the Irish. Irish linen, for example, was world renowned More importantly, these materials were economic due to the high concentration of agricultural communities in Ireland which made them abundant and cheap.

During the 19th and 20th centuries, Ireland faced many political and subsequently economic disruptions. Most notable of these are the Famine, the Easter Rising, the Civil War, and the Troubles. Each of these disruptions were of great detriment to economic stability, despite these setbacks Irish designers persevered pushing their work onto the international stage.

Some such artists like Sybil Connolly, and other Dubliners leaned into the idea of heritage, and native fabrics in their work, which ended up being crucial to the growth of the fashion industry and economy. These designers gained further international recognition of Irish fashion by mixing the idea of heritage with contemporary ideas. For example, Connolly reworked hallmark pieces like the shawl and petticoat with modern techniques to become designer pieces. Another notable Irish designer is Orla Kiely, who homed in on printed textile design. Her work is particularly colorful and playful, often including simple shapes but made with an haute couture twist to create both clothing and more. She has become famous for her work which is shown various international museums such as Dublin's EPIC Museum, and London's Fashion Museum.

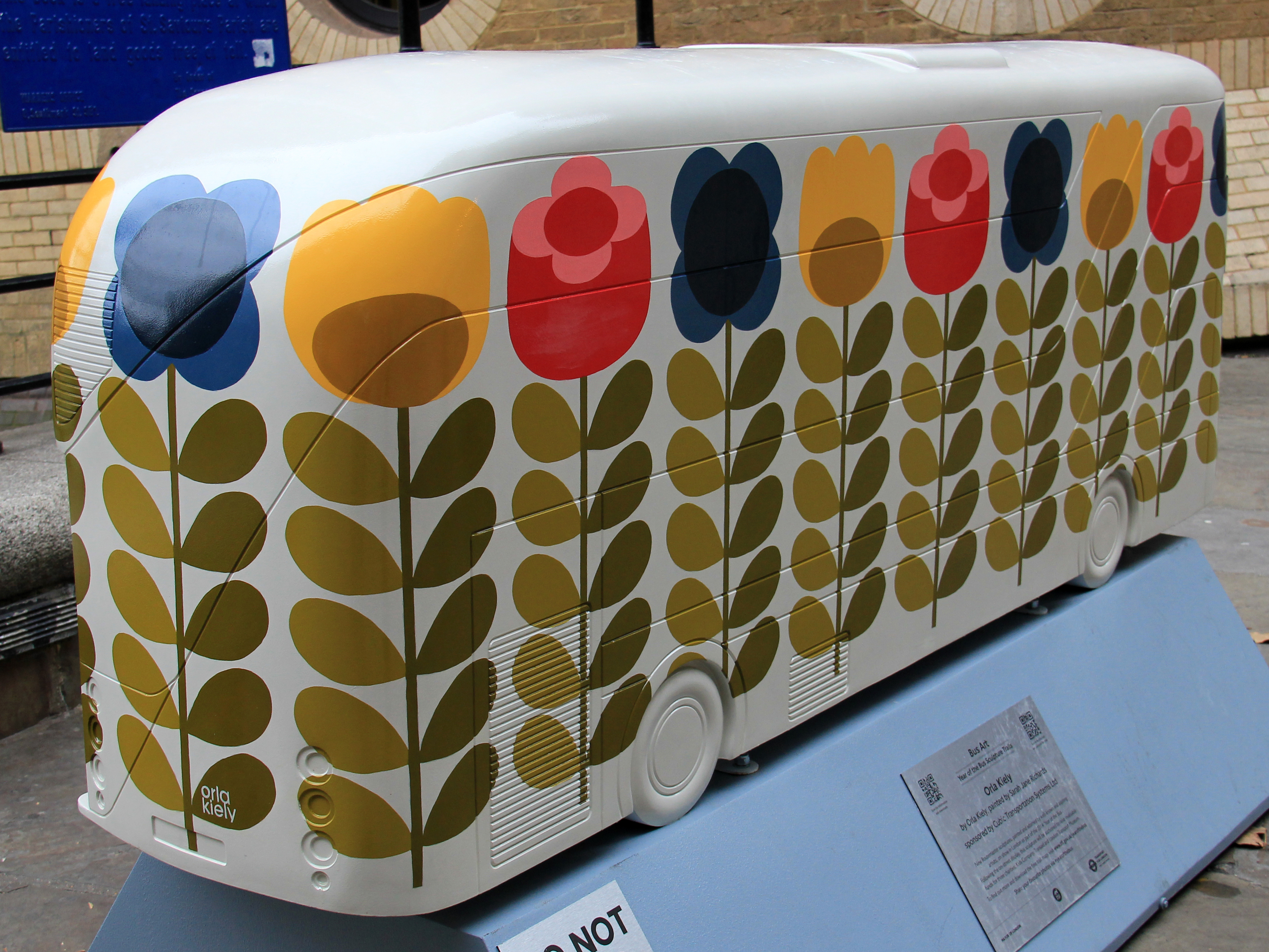
A design by Kiely implemented on a bus, celebrating the 75th anniversary of the Routemaster bus.

Innovative work in design aside, there was not much change to the pieces which made up the Irish wardrobe. Afterall, due to the weather it was necessary to layer up with appropriate clothing such as trousers, layered tops, and a wool overcoat.

== Contemporary fashion ==
In the 21st century, this theme of reinventing traditional materials continues. However, the industry is shifting to be even more inclusive, as well as prioritizing modern culture and globalization in its focuses. For example, Irish designer Roisin Pierce focuses her work on exploring delicacy with traditional materials. Her flowy and feminine silhouettes contrast the work of previous designers like Connolly which featured structured silhouettes. Moreover, her pieces are highly experimental in the fashion industry as a whole. Simultaneously, Irish designer Oran Aurelio is connecting Irish work with pop culture. He has worked on developing a unique style incorporating ornate details like sequins, and bright colors typically not shown in the Irish palette. His work has led him to dress international celebrities like Chappell Roan, and others. A common thread linking many Irish designers today are the ideas of glamour, sustainability, and storytelling. Both Aurelio and Pierce use their designs to explore themes like ephemerality, and personal narratives adding the flare of dramatic details with sustainable practice.

Following the increased visibility of Irish fashion in the late 20th century, the industry has continued to grow both nationally and internationally. The government has taken steps to systematically promote Irish fashion such as in 2025, when Ireland established its first ever national fashion week. The fashion week played a vital role in further disseminating Irish work to a global audience. The work is also being done by individual artists such as Roisin Pierce, who displayed her work at Paris Fashion Week, even getting media attention from Comme Des Garcons - a very well-known label.

== Gallery ==
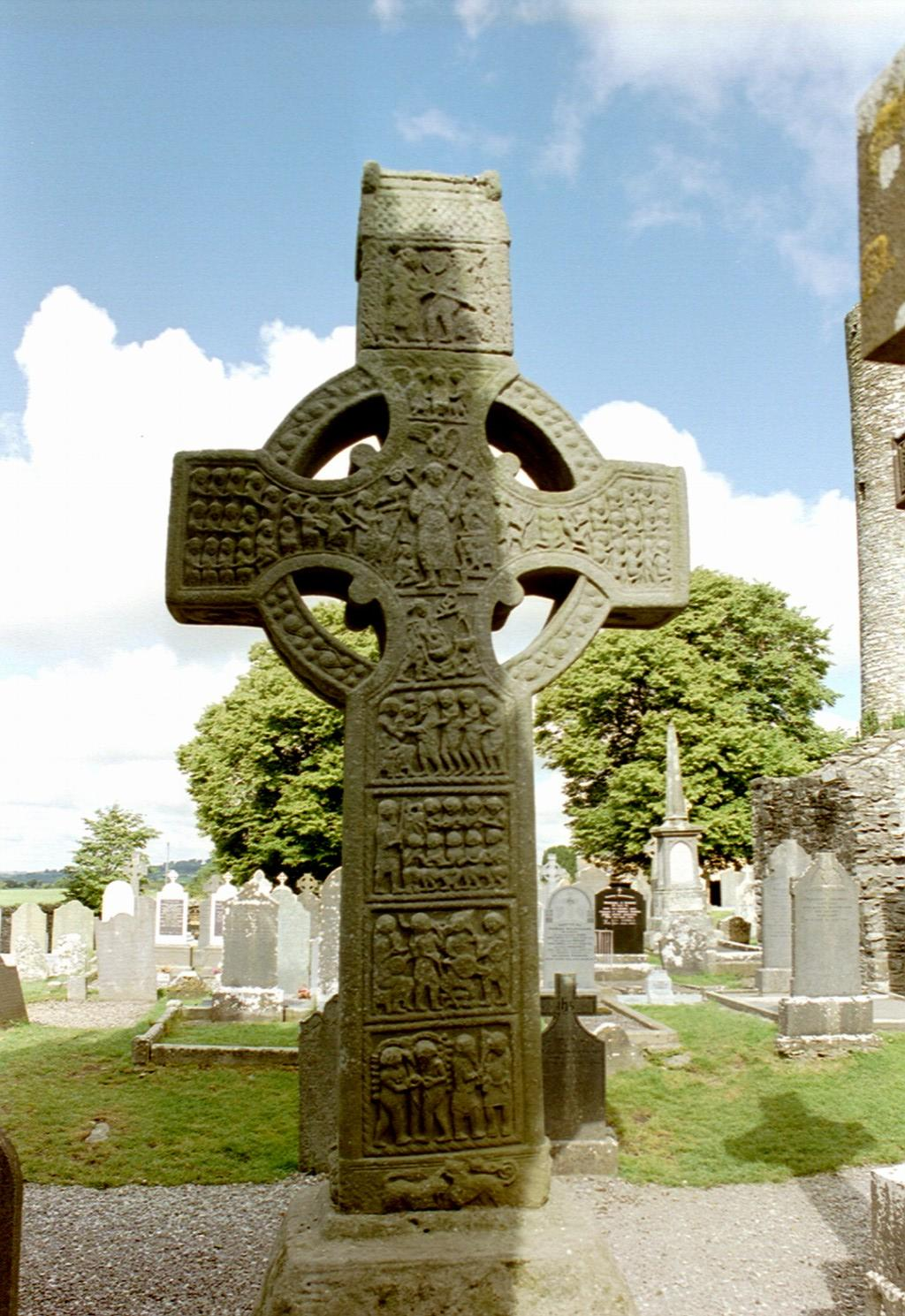
Muiredach's High Cross (9th century) clearly depicting the Irish léine and mantles.

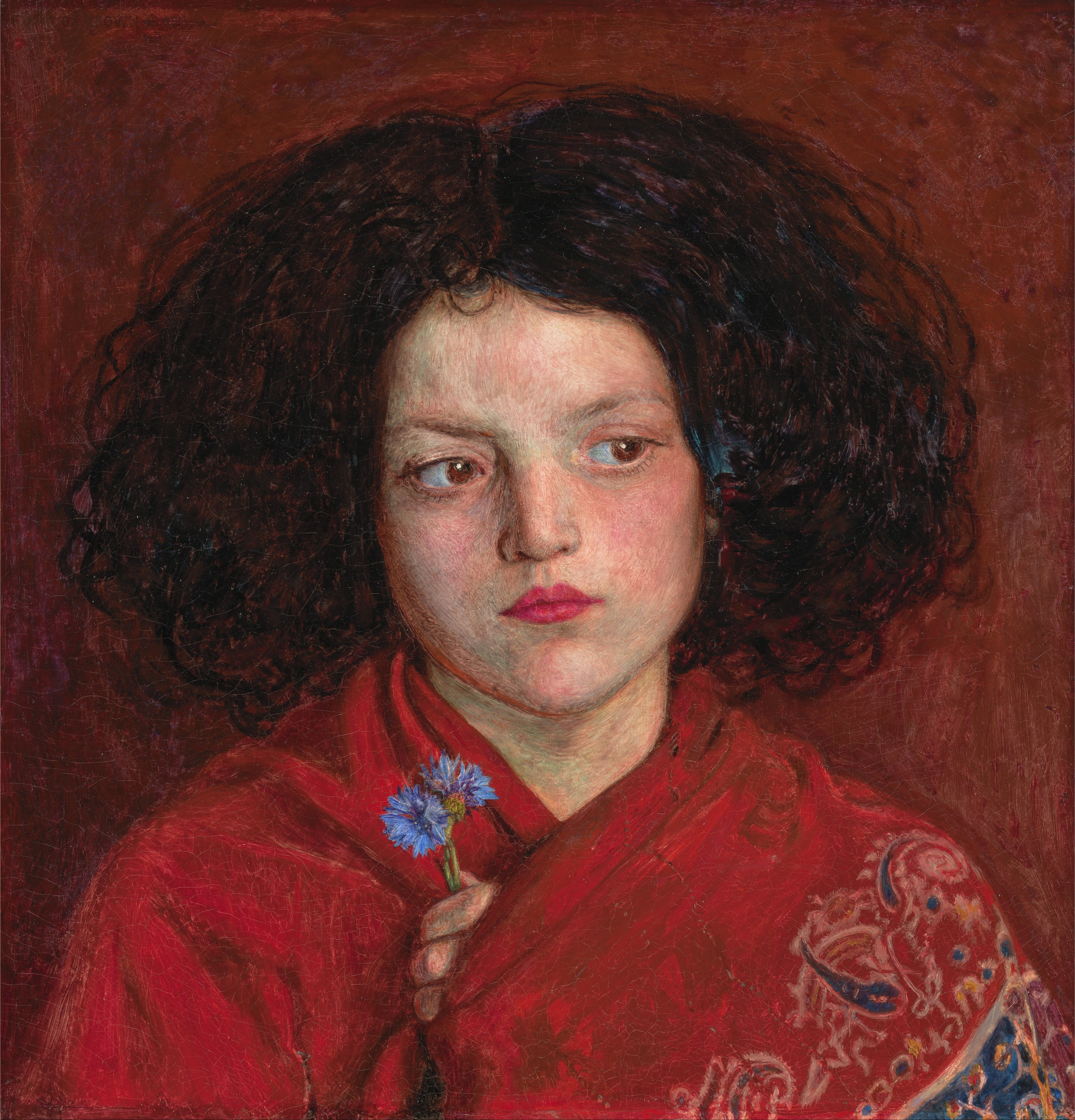
The Irish Girl by Ford Maxon Brown, 1860

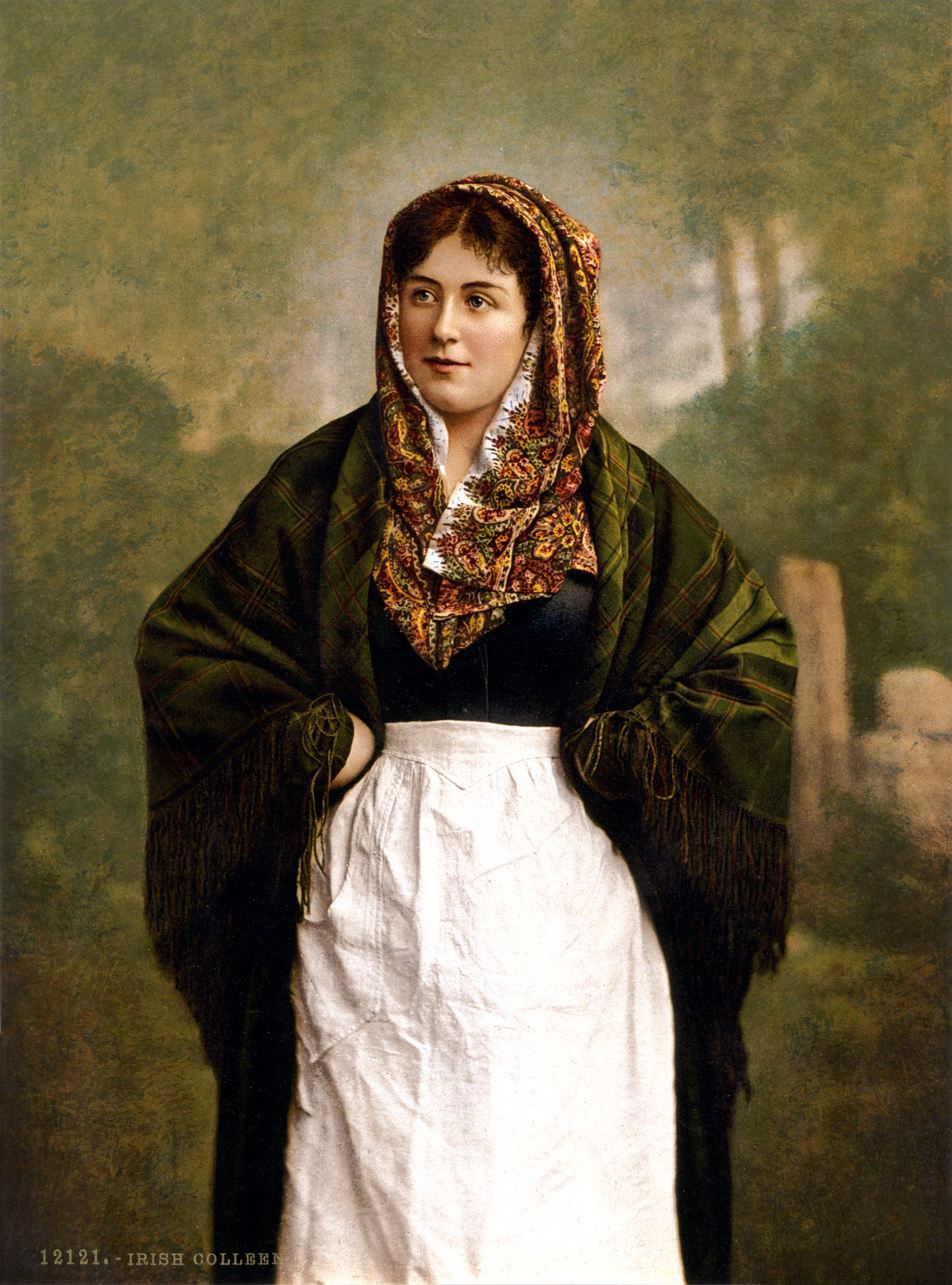
An Irish cailín in traditional dress, c.1890

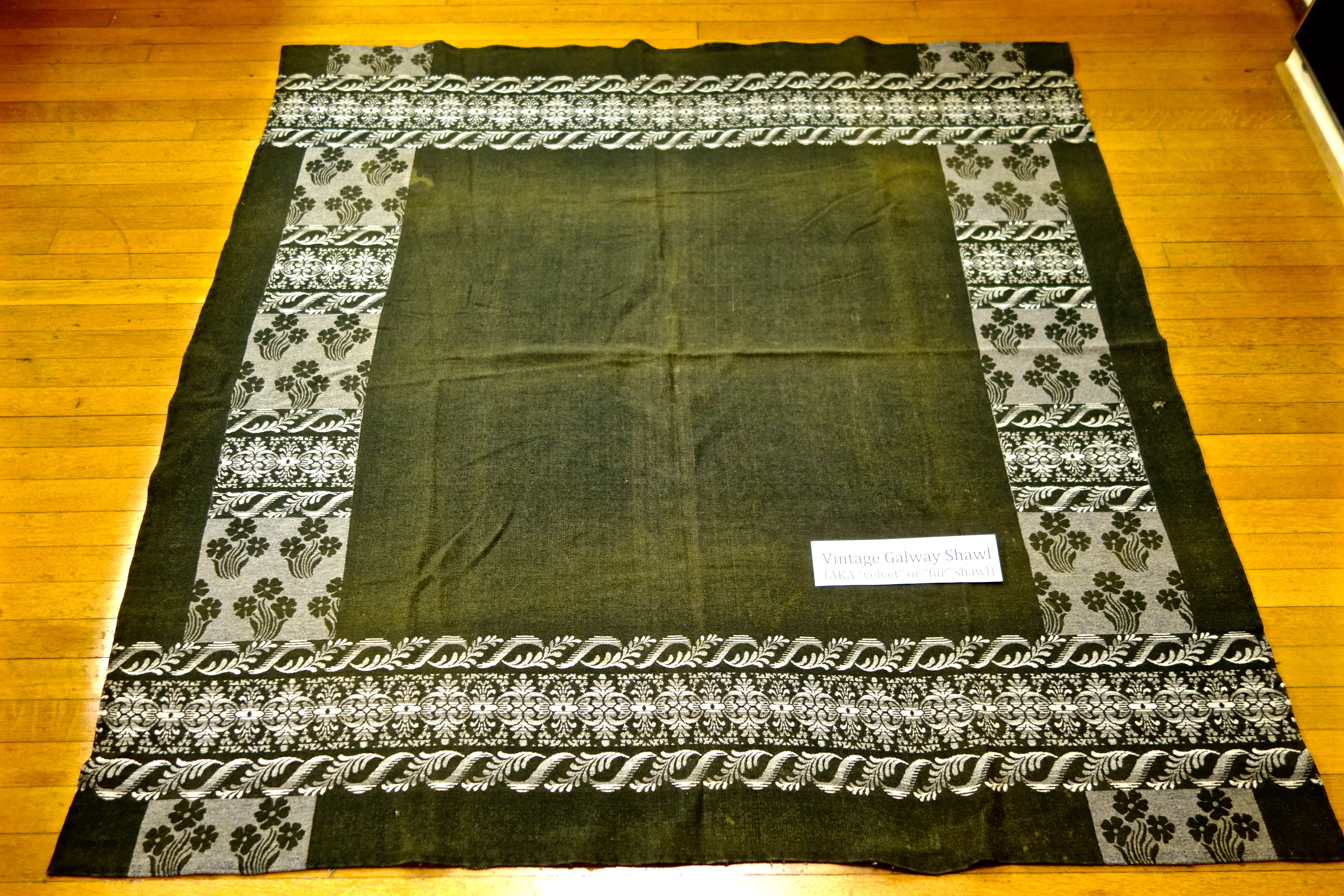
Vintage Galway shawl with its fringe removed

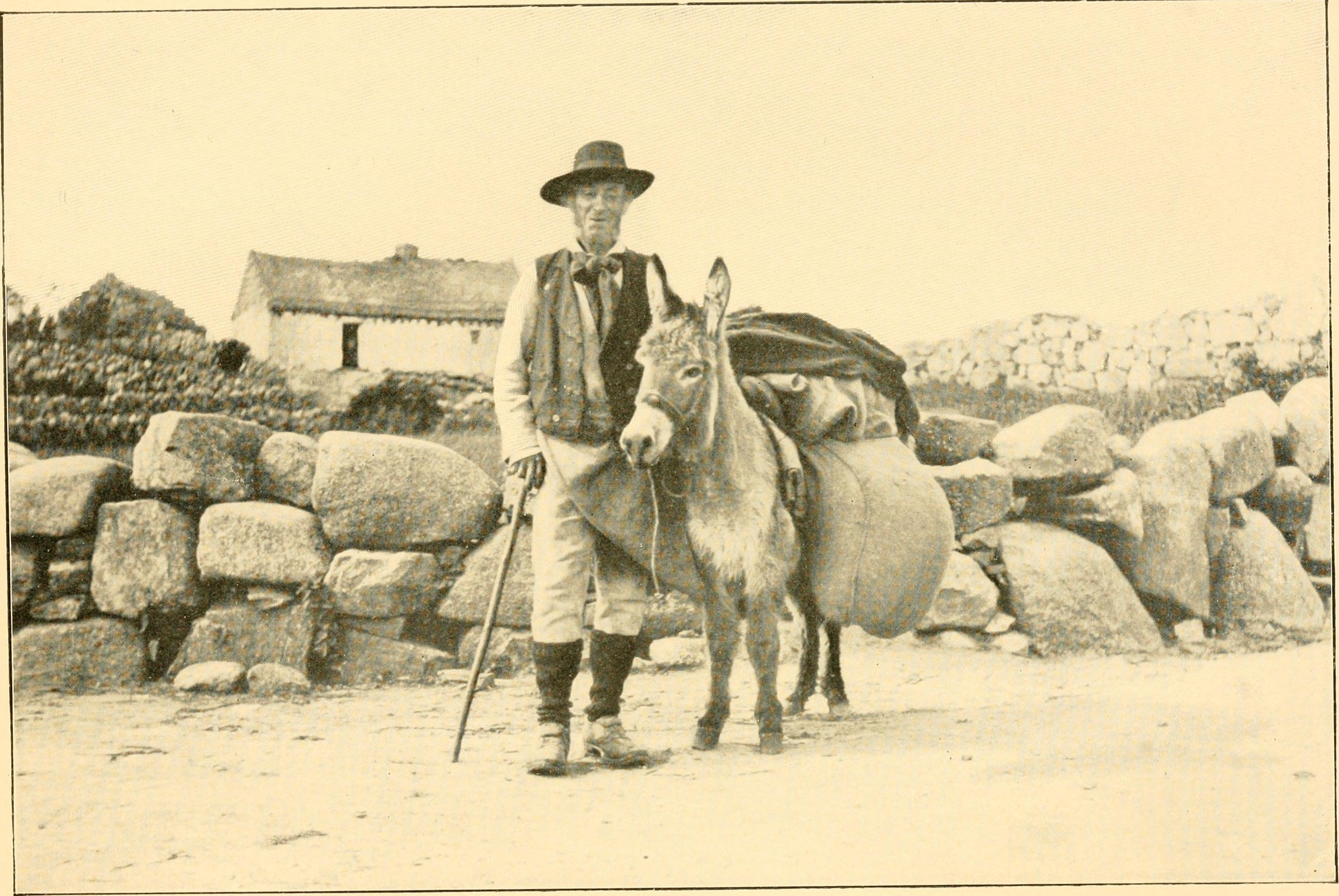
An Irishman in County Galway, 1902

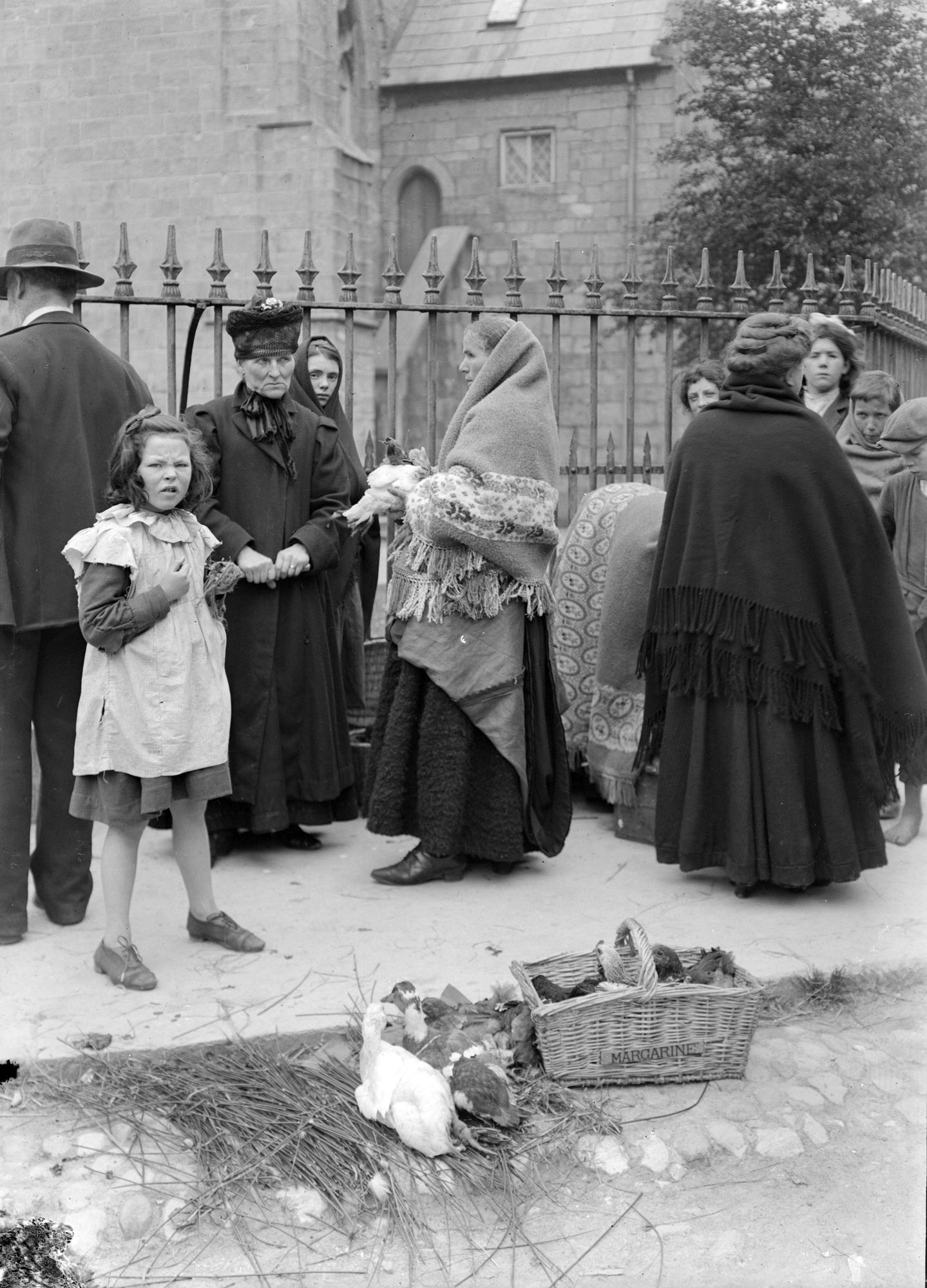
A Market Square in Galway, circa 1910

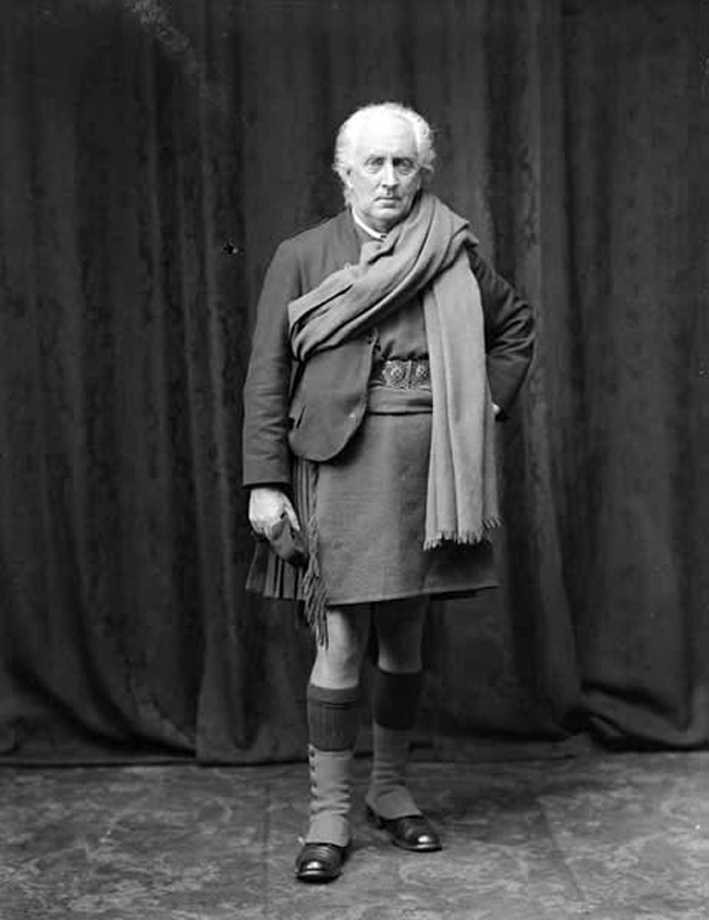
William Gibson, 2nd Baron Ashbourne (1929) adopted "Irish dress" during the Gaelic revival

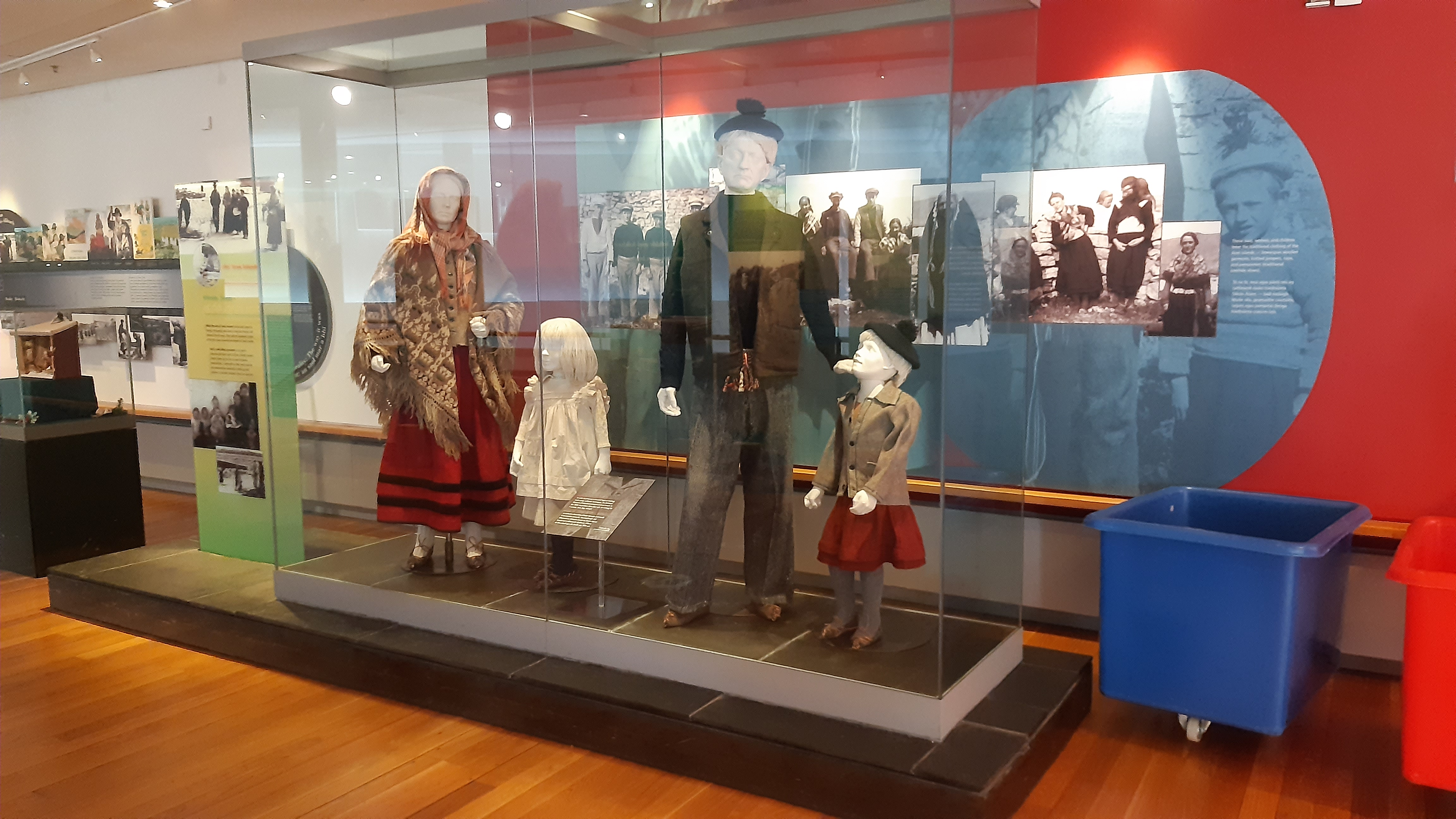
Examples of traditional clothes previously worn on the Aran Islands at the National Museum of Ireland – Country Life

== See also ==
- Pampooties, rawhide shoes, which were formerly made and worn on the Aran Islands of County Galway
