= William Gibson, 2nd Baron Ashbourne =

Baron, writer, linguist (1868–1942)

The Right Honourable The Lord Ashbourne
- Baron Ashbourne
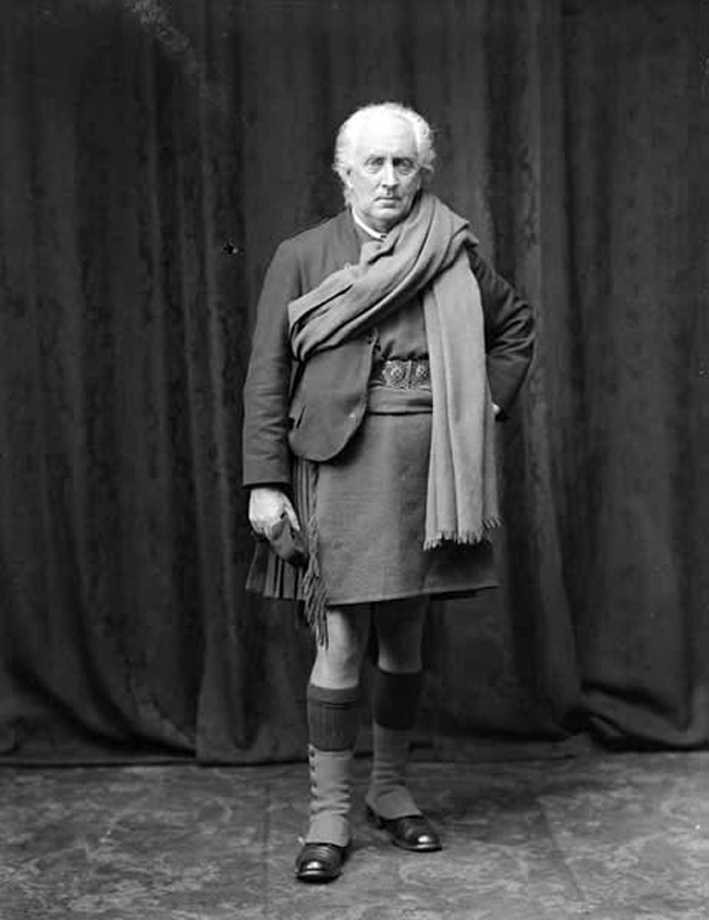
- William Gibson, 2nd Baron Ashbourne (1929)
- Tenure: 1913–1942
- Predecessor: Edward Gibson
- Successor: Edward Gibson
- Born: 16 December 1868; Dublin
- Died: 21 January 1942 (aged 73)
- Spouse: Marianne de Monbrison (m. 1896)
- Father: Edward Gibson, 1st Baron Ashbourne
- Mother: Frances Maria Adelaide Colles
- Occupation: Author

William Gibson, 2nd Baron Ashbourne (16 December 1868 – 21 January 1942), was an Irish language activist and author.

== Life ==
Born in Dublin, to Edward Gibson, 1st Baron Ashbourne, and Frances Maria Adelaide Colles (a granddaughter of Abraham Colles and niece of John Dawson Mayne), Gibson was educated at Harrow School, Trinity College, Dublin, and Merton College, Oxford University. He succeeded to the title of 2nd Baron Ashbourne, of Ashbourne, County Meath, in 1913 and held the office of Justice of the Peace for County Dublin and County Meath. He was a founder of the Roger Bacon Society and Vice-President of the Irish Literary Society. He was the author of The Abbe de Lammenais and the Liberal Catholic Movement in France and was a contributor to The Dublin and other reviews. In 1896, he married Marianne de Monbrison (died 1953), daughter of Henri Roger Conquerré de Monbrison of Paris, a French Protestant from the Languedoc. Marianne's sister was married to Count Edmond de Poutales. Lord and Lady Ashbourne left no children.

Gibson was an enthusiastic cultural nationalist and converted to Catholicism. He adopted Irish dress and was a member of the Gaelic League. He spoke French rather than English to those who did not speak Irish. He occasionally spoke Irish in the House of Lords, though it was remarked "The House of Lords was in England, and what good was it for him to talk Irish to Englishmen while the Irish people of Galway spoke English to one another?"

His father had left £100,000 in his will, and though "Willie" was the eldest son and heir, because of his nationalist leanings, he was left with only a "paltry" £800, the bulk having been passed to his younger brother, Edward Gibson (1873–1928), father of the third Baron Ashbourne.

Mary Leslie, a member of the family of the Leslie family of Glaslough, Monaghan, said of Lord Ashbourne:

"I am so interested by the Ashbourne's son, a half hatched philosopher & saint who has an article in this 19th Century & is writing on "Danton" for the next. He has the eyes of a Melancthon but the mouth & wit of a Paddy. He was a positivist before he turned Catholic. He has the worst clothes of any philosopher I've met..."

In spite of his Irish Nationalist leanings, he lived near Dorking, Surrey, before he and his wife moved to France, where they lived at Compagnie, where he died. On the back of a letter that he wrote to his wife in 1937, he wrote the opening lines of a poem:

"I turned away, my soul was rich with sadness, And wondered thence in brooding reverie..."

== Publications ==
The Abbe de Lamennais and the liberal Catholic movement in France, 1896.

== Arms ==
Coat of arms of William Gibson, 2nd Baron Ashbourne
Crest On a bank of reeds a pelican in her piety all Proper. Escutcheon Ermine three keys fesswise in pale Azure and in chief as many trefoils slipped Vert. Supporters Dexter a female figure representing Mercy her interior hand resting on a sword point downwards all Proper; sinister a female figure representing Justice holding in her left hand a sword point upwards and in her right hand a balance all Proper; each charged on the breast with a trefoil slipped Vert and each standing on a fasces also Proper. Motto Coelestes Pandite Portae

Peerage of the United Kingdom
Preceded by Edward Gibson	Baron Ashbourne; 1913–1942	Succeeded by Edward Gibson
