= Baron Ashbourne =

Title in the Peerage of the United Kingdom

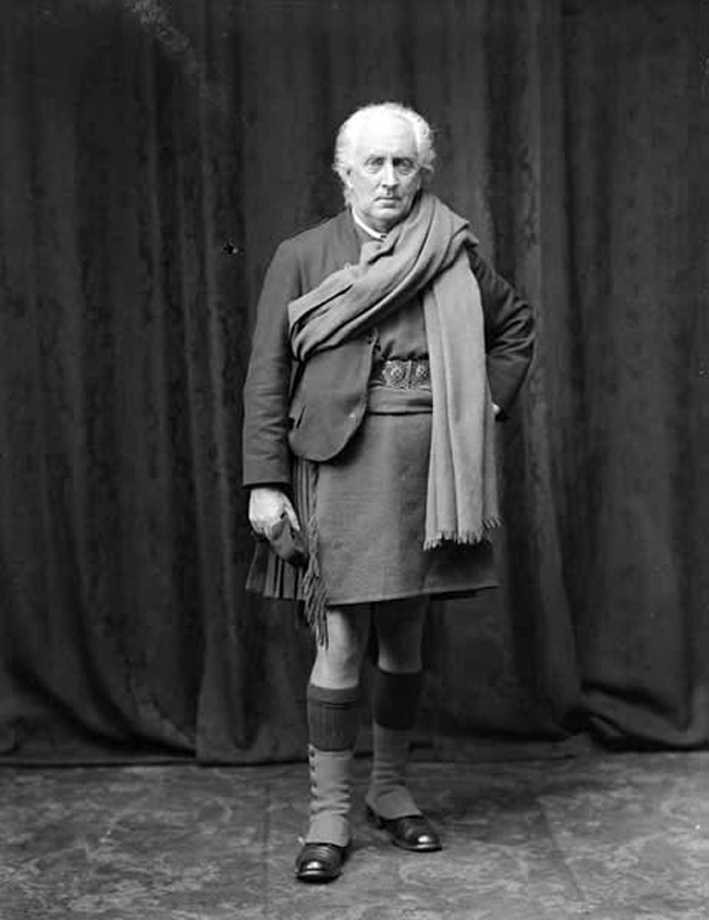
William Gibson, 2nd Baron Ashbourne

Baron Ashbourne, of Ashbourne in the County of Meath, is a title in the Peerage of the United Kingdom. It was created in 1886 for Edward Gibson, the Lord Chancellor of Ireland. His grandson, the third Baron (who succeeded his uncle), was a vice admiral in the Royal Navy. As of 2020, the title is held by the third Baron's grandson, the fifth Baron, who succeeded in 2020.

John George Gibson, younger brother of the first Baron, was also a distinguished lawyer. Violet Gibson, who attempted to assassinate Benito Mussolini in 1926, was the first Baron's daughter.

== Baron Ashbourne (1886) ==
- Edward Gibson, 1st Baron Ashbourne (1837–1913)
- William Gibson, 2nd Baron Ashbourne (1868–1942)
- Edward Russell Gibson, 3rd Baron Ashbourne (1901–1983)
- (Edward) Barry Greynville Gibson, 4th Baron Ashbourne (1933–2020)
- (Edward) Charles d'Olier Gibson, 5th Baron Ashbourne (born 1967)

The heir apparent is the present holder's son, the Hon. Edward Alexander Gibson (born 2002).

=== Male-line family tree ===
Male-line family tree, Barons Ashbourne

Edward Gibson; 1st Baron Ashbourne; 1837–1913
William Gibson; 2nd Baron Ashbourne; 1868–1942	Lt. Hon. Henry Gibson; 1870–1905	Hon. Edward Gibson; 1873–1928
Edward Gibson; 3rd Baron Ashbourne; 1901–1983
Barry Gibson; 4th Baron Ashbourne; 1933–2020
Charles Gibson; 5th Baron Ashbourne born 1967
Hon. Edward Gibson born 2002

== Arms ==
Coat of arms of Baron Ashbourne
Crest On a bank of reeds a pelican in her piety all Proper. Escutcheon Ermine three keys fesswise in pale Azure and in chief as many trefoils slipped Vert. Supporters Dexter a female figure representing Mercy her interior hand resting on a sword point downwards all Proper; sinister a female figure representing Justice holding in her left hand a sword point upwards and in her right hand a balance all Proper; each charged on the breast with a trefoil slipped Vert and each standing on a fasces also Proper. Motto Coelestes Pandite Portae
