= Galway shawl =

Traditional Irish clothing

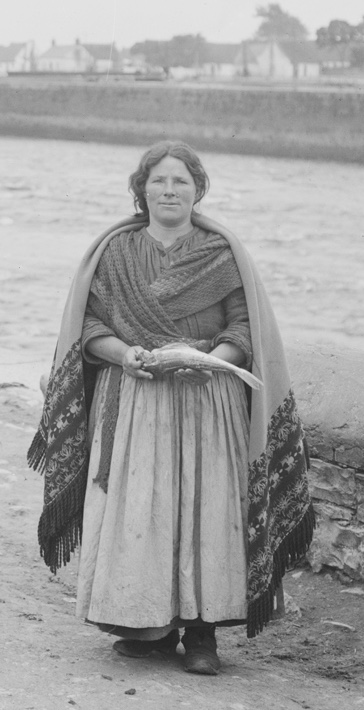
Galway shawl on fish seller, Claddagh, Galway, Ireland, 1905.

The term Galway shawl (Irish: seál na Gaillimhe) usually refers to a specific type of heavyweight shawl that was worn by Irish women during the colder seasons. It became popular during the late nineteenth century and was still being worn up until the 1950s by a few, older Irish women. Throughout Ireland, not just in Galway, women traditionally wore various types of lightweight shawls that were hand knit, crocheted, or woven; and would have been of solid color, plaid, print, or paisley. Lightweight shawls, worn directly over the blouse and tied or tucked in at the waist, were worn in all seasons, both indoors and out. The Galway shawl was a winter-weight outer garment worn over the lightweight shawl.

== History ==
The Galway shawl was woven on a hand jacquard loom in Paisley, Scotland, but used neither the design nor construction of the shawl commonly known as the Paisley shawl. The Galway shawl was woven on a cotton warp with a weft of botany wool. These reversible shawls were a solid colour in the centre with a decorative, multicolour, wide border, and they were fringed. The Galway shawl contained neither velvet nor fur, but it was referred to by weavers as a velvet or fur shawl because it was heavily milled in the finishing and a soft, velvet-like nap was raised on the surface. In 1892, one company in Paisley employed 40 weavers producing this type of shawl. The last firm weaving fur or velvet shawls closed in 1943, and one of its looms was donated to the Paisley Museum where it is still on display, though it is no longer in working condition. (Edward Harrison states that the last two firms closed in 1941.)

According to Coughlin, the shawls were fringed at the factory in Paisley, and could be returned to the factory for repair if the fringe became damaged. Owens, however, reports that the shawls were shipped unfringed from Paisley to the Galway Woollen Mills where the fringe was added. Because several factories produced the shawls, both cases could be true.

During the time of their popularity, the eye-catching shawls were costly items, worn with pride, and considered "Sunday best" in Ireland. They were usually inherited or acquired for the bride-to-be upon marriage. As years passed, the Galway shawl became unfashionable, and older women who continued to wear them became known as shawlies. The shawlies and their Galway shawls became associated in the popular imagination with poverty and backwardness. However, the costuming of Maureen O’Hara in a Galway shawl for the film "The Quiet Man" prompted a renewed appreciation for the beauty of the Galway shawl.

== Gallery ==
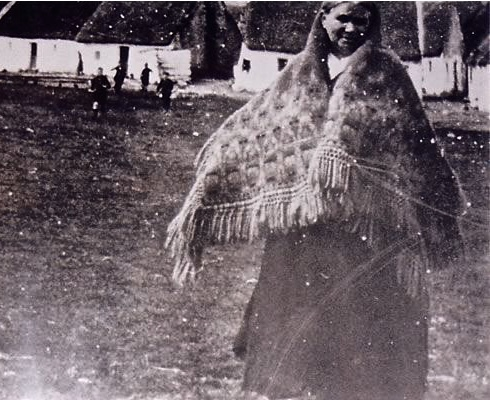
Woman wearing a Galway shawl in Galway, Ireland.

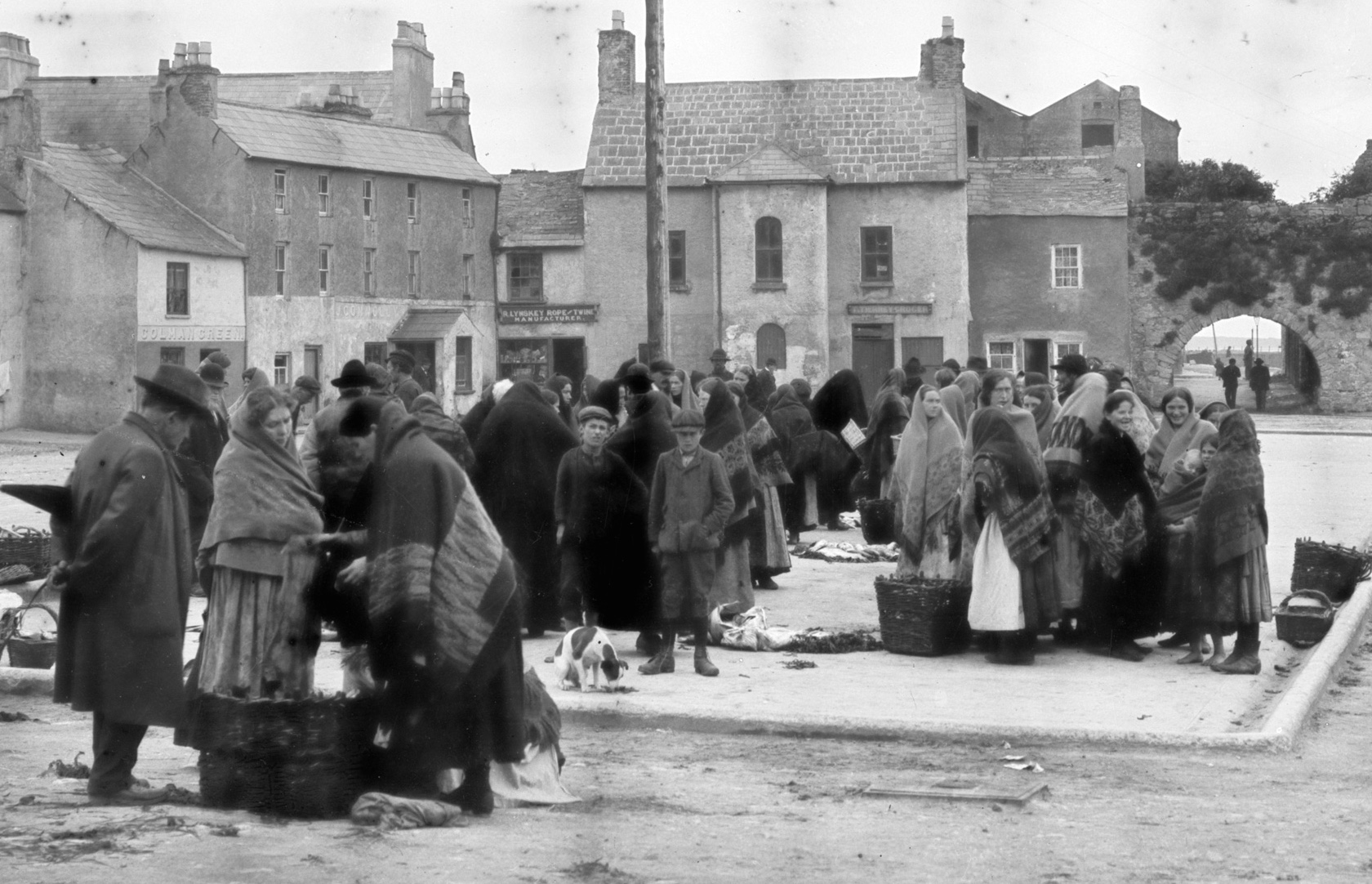
Women wearing Galway shawls at Galway Fish Market, Ireland. 1905

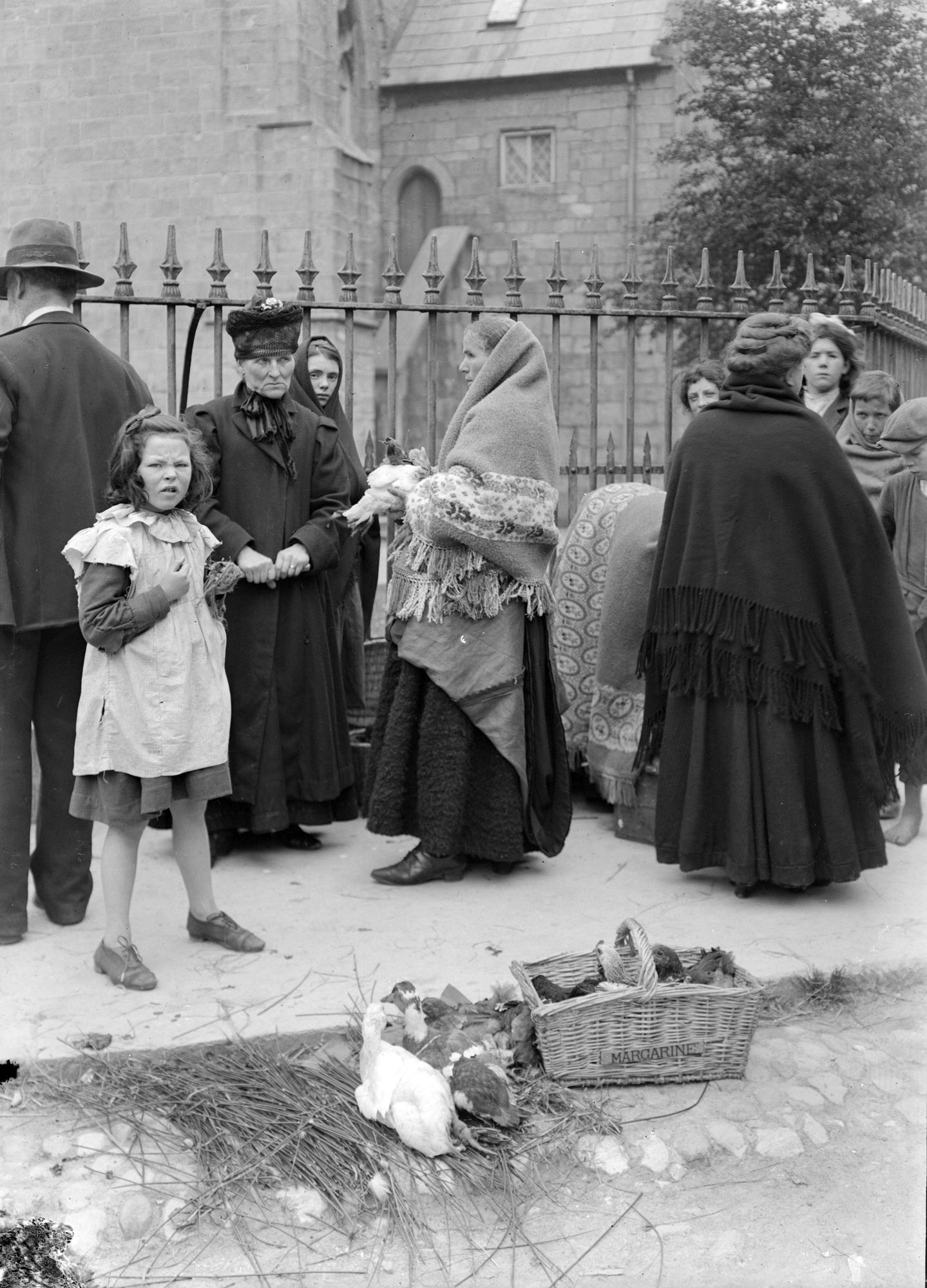
Woman wearing a Galway Shawl in Galway. About 1910

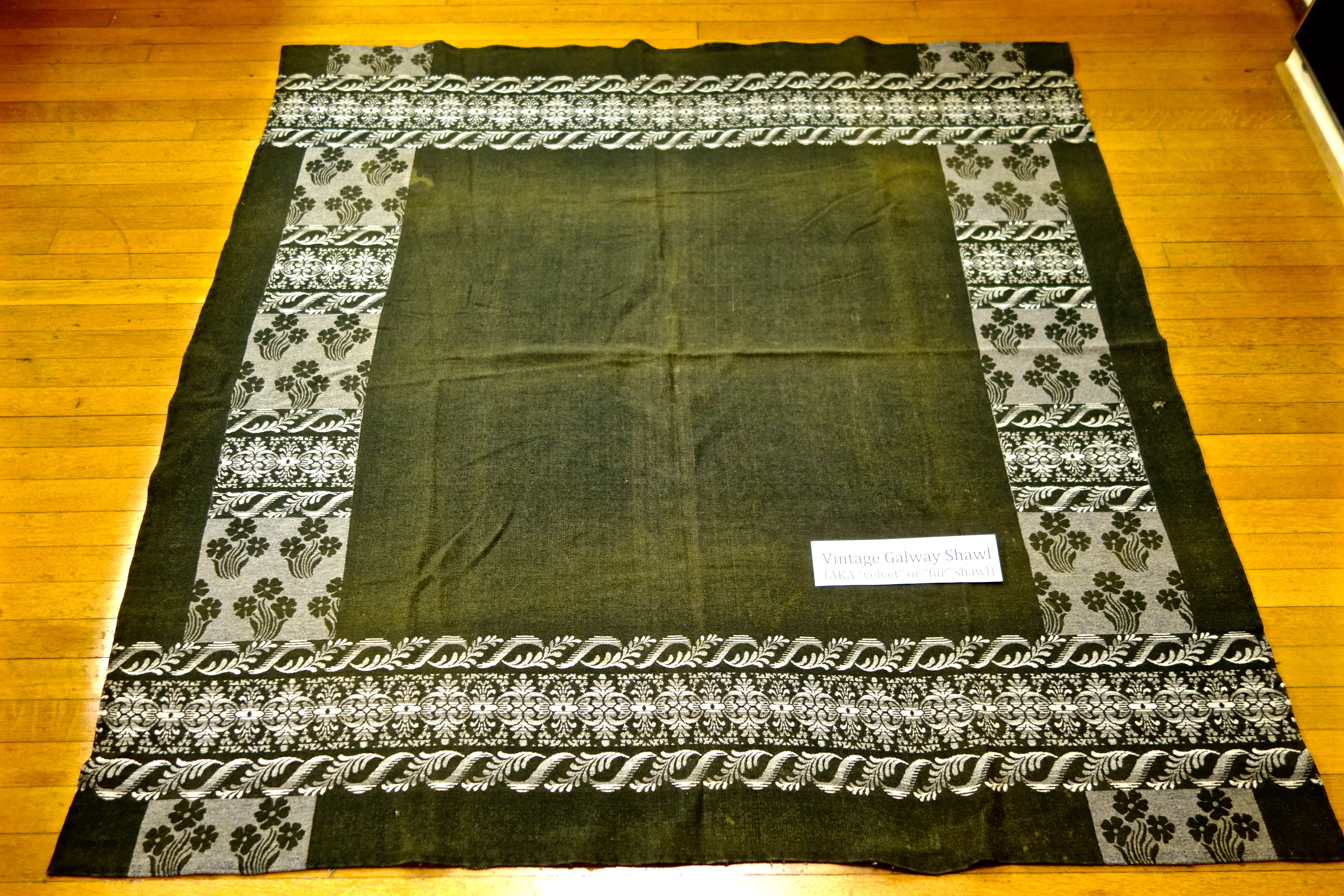
A vintage Galway shawl with fringe removed.

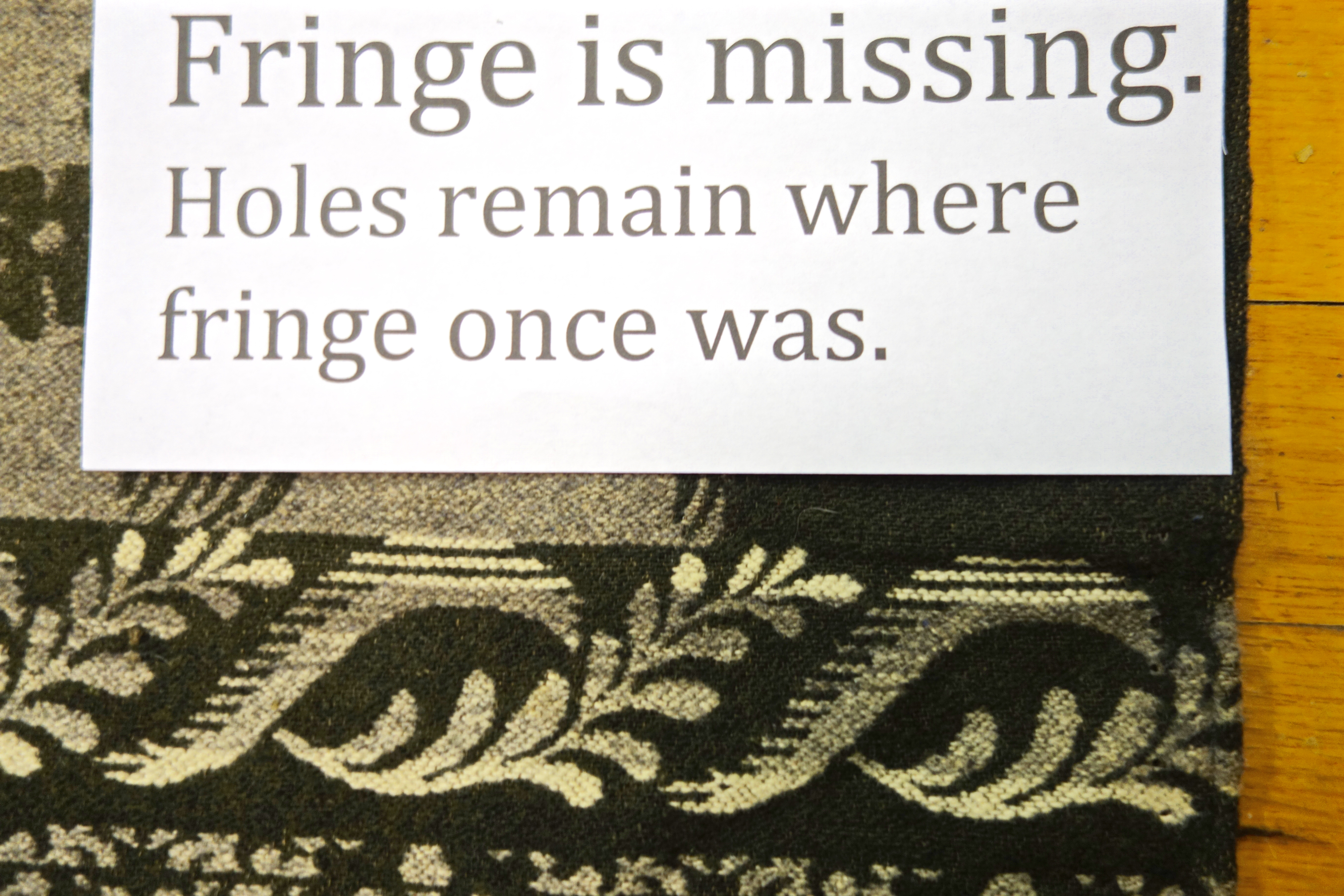
Close up of a vintage Galway shawl showing the weave. Fringe missing, holes remain.

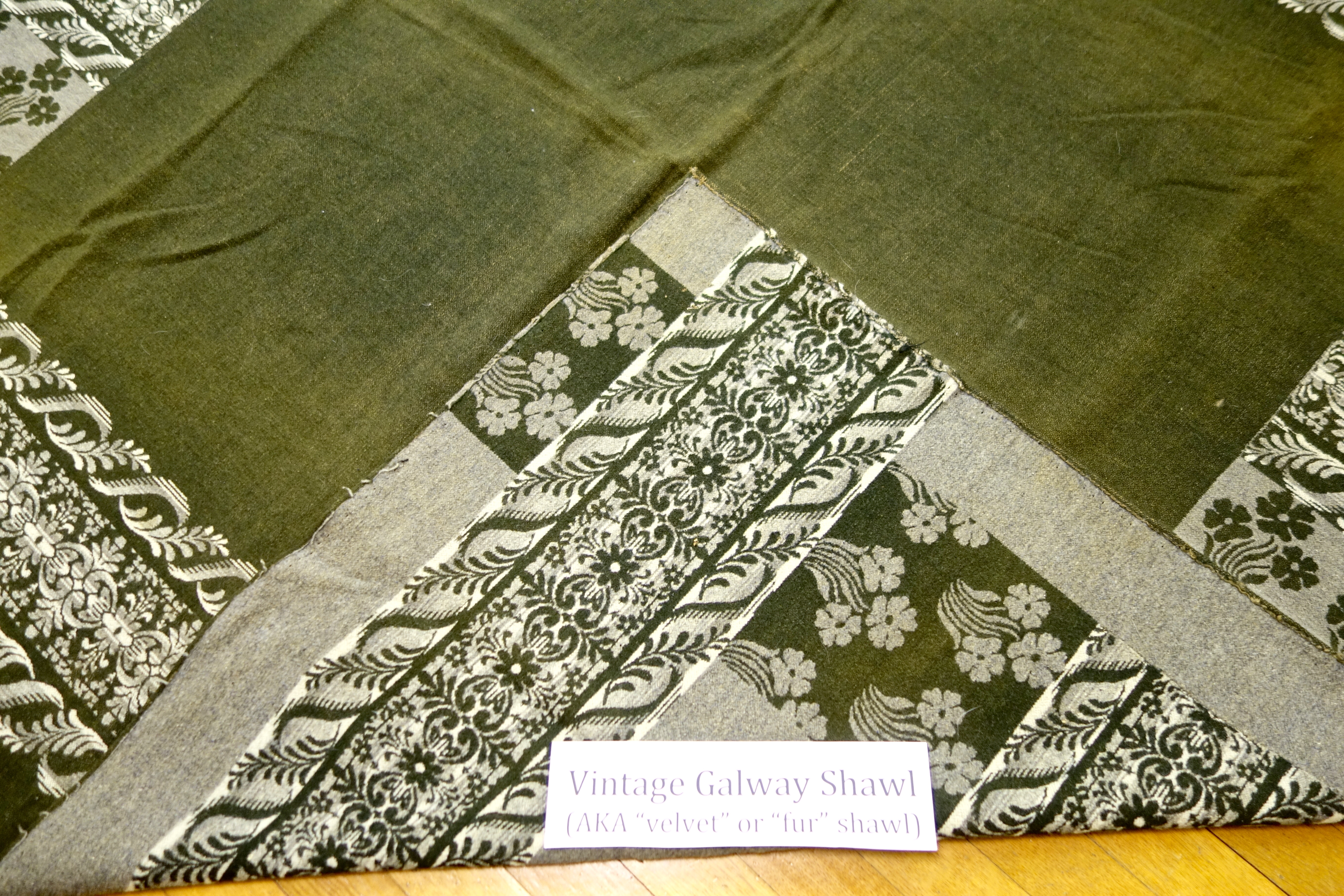
A vintage Galway shawl with corner flipped so both sides show.

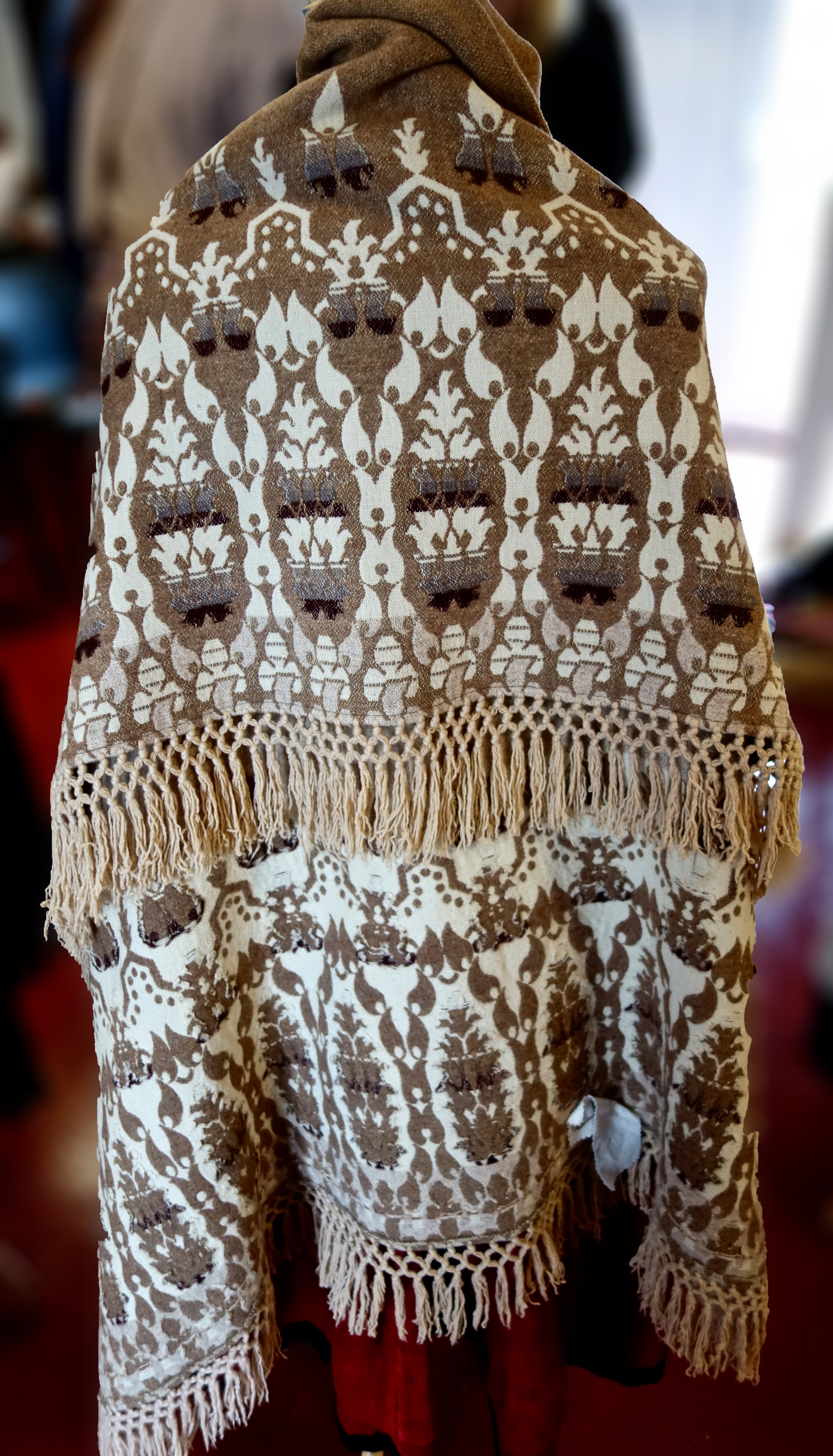
A Galway Shawl held in a small traditional clothing collection on Inisheer.

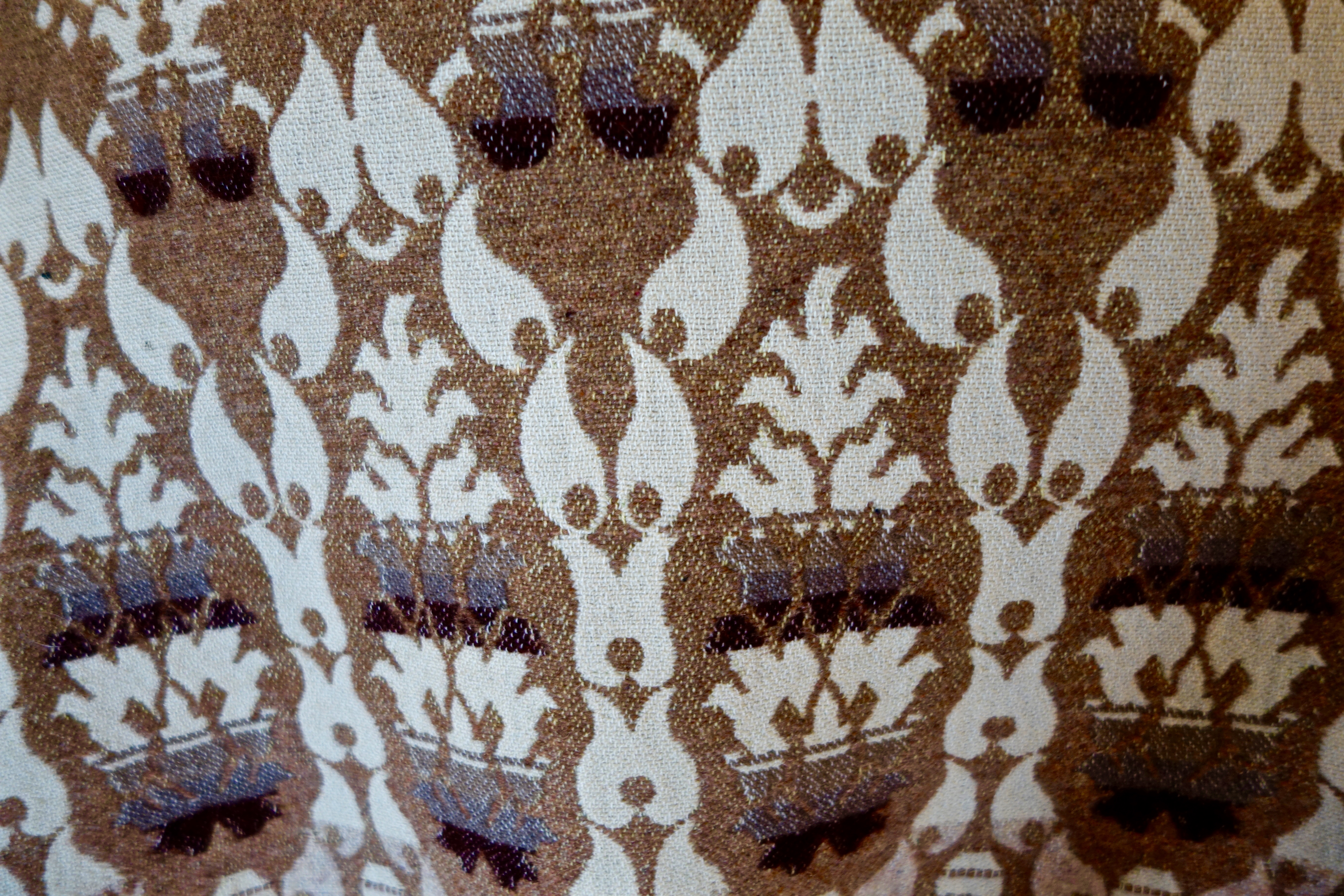
A close up showing the weave of an Irish Galway Shawl.
