= Alexander Cameron (priest) =

Scottish nobleman, household servant and priest

Father Alexander Cameron SJ
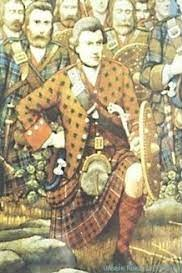
- Genuflecting on the eve of the Battle of Prestonpans

Personal life
- Born: 17 September 1701 Achnacarry Castle, Lochaber, Scotland
- Died: 19 October 1746 (aged 45) Gravesend, Kent, England
- Cause of death: Likely a mixture of typhus, injuries sustained during torture, starvation, and medical neglect
- Resting place: Cemetery of St George's Church, Gravesend; 51.44410°N 0.36850°E

Religious life
- Religion: Christianity
- Denomination: Catholic Church
- Profession: Scottish priest

Alexander Cameron of Lochiel, S.J. (Scottish Gaelic: Maighstir Sandaidh, an t-Athair Alasdair Camshron) (17 September 1701 in Achnacarry Castle, Lochaber, Scotland – 19 October 1746 in Gravesend, Kent, England) was a Scottish Catholic priest and outlawed missionary, who became a Jacobite Army captain and military chaplain.

Cameron was born the third son of John Cameron of Lochiel, the 18th chief of Clan Cameron. As an adult, he travelled to Europe employed at the House of Stuart government in exile in Rome as "an honorary gentleman of the bedchamber" to Prince James Francis Edward Stuart, where he converted from the Scottish Episcopal Church to Catholicism. After ordination as a priest, he was ordered by the Society of Jesus in 1741 to return to Scotland. Living in a cave and aided by two fellow priests, Cameron ran an underground ministry to Clan Chisholm and Clan Fraser of Lovat throughout The Aird and Strathglass for the illegal Catholic Church in Scotland. This provoked a 1744 government crackdown which forced Cameron to flee to his native district in the Rough Bounds of Lochaber. Cameron was assigned as a military chaplain to the regiment of the Jacobite Army commanded by his elder brother, Donald Cameron of Lochiel, the 19th chief of Clan Cameron. Alexander Cameron served in this position for the rest of the Jacobite rising of 1745. Cameron was captured while in hiding at the White Sands of Morar. He died four months later of the conditions of his incarceration aboard Royal Navy Captain John Fergussone's prison hulk H.M.S. Furnace, at anchor off Gravesend.

== Family background ==
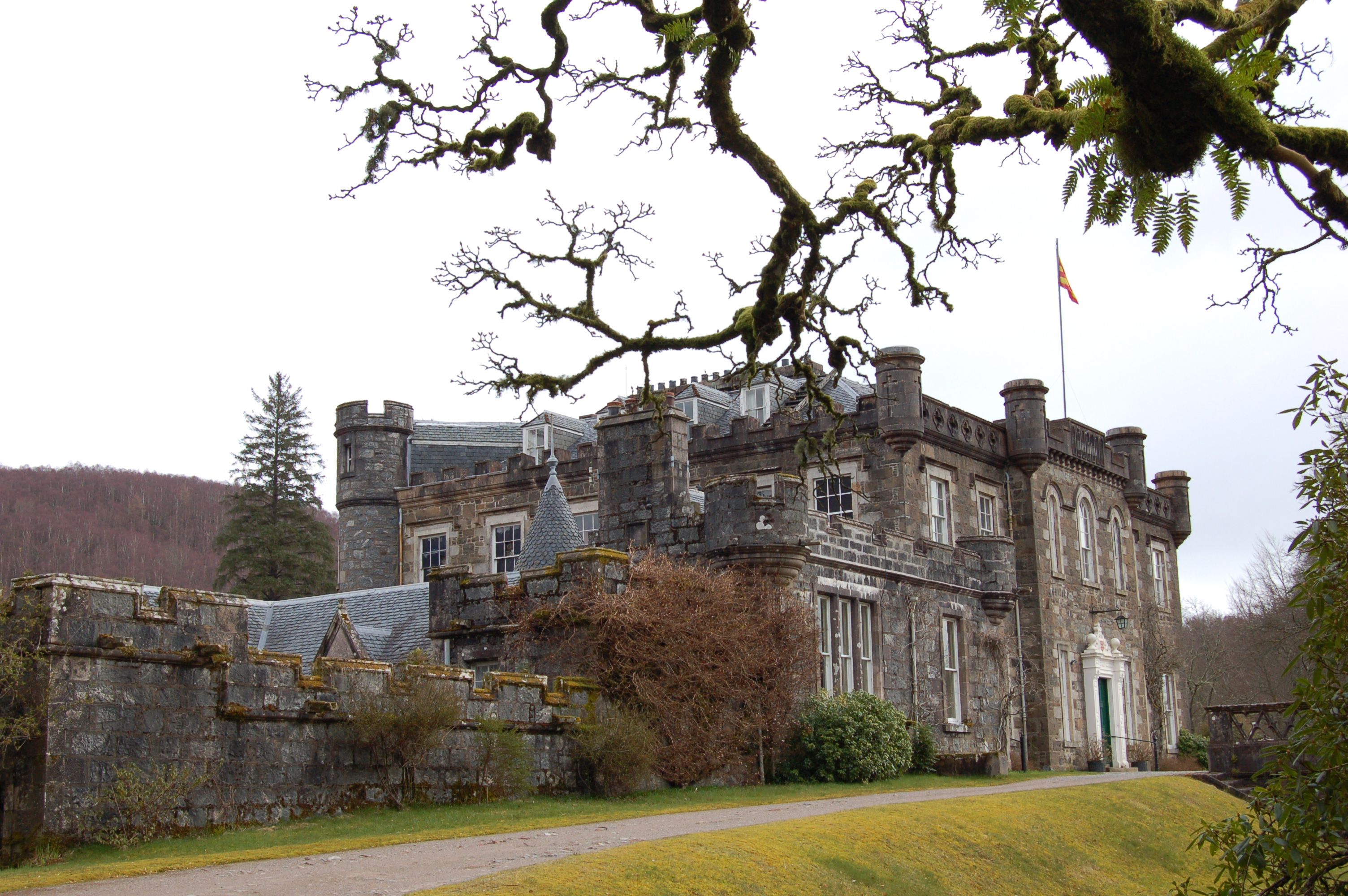
Achnacarry Castle

Arms of Clan Cameron of Lochiel

Alexander Cameron was the son of John Cameron, tanist of Lochiel, and grandson of Ewen Cameron of Lochiel, who had led the clan during the Wars of the Three Kingdoms and the Jacobite rising of 1689. Alexander Cameron's mother, Lady Isobel Campbell of Lochnell, came from a cadet branch of Clan Campbell.

Alexander Cameron was the younger brother of Donald Cameron of Lochiel, who would later become the chief of Clan Cameron and lead the Clan's regiment in the 1745 uprising. His other siblings were John Cameron, 1st of Fassiefern (1698–1785), Dr Archibald Cameron (1707–1753), and Colony of Jamaica planter Ewan Cameron.

His family remained Catholic for several generations after the Scottish Reformation and supported the Episcopalian hierarchy of the Church of Scotland against the Covenanters during the Bishops' Wars.

== Early life ==
Alexander Cameron was born on 17 September 1701 at Achnacarry Castle.

After the 1719 uprising failed, his father left Scotland once again for what would become a permanent exile in France, while Cameron's mother, Lady Isobel, remained behind at Achnacarry Castle. He attended a boarding school at St. Ninian's near Stirling at the expense of his foster-father. He was later described as multilingual and, in addition to his native Scottish Gaelic language, also spoke and wrote Ecclesiastical Latin, English, French, and Italian.

As a young man, Cameron travelled to the British West Indies to visit the Colony of Jamaica, where the plantations his eldest brother had purchased as an investment were managed by their youngest brother, Ewan Cameron. He had been sent to Jamaica on raise funds for the family, but was unsuccessful and returned to Scotland. Although the exact regiment has not yet been traced, he then briefly served in the French Royal Army, where he was granted an officer's rank. Around 1727, Cameron reunited with his exiled father in France.

== Conversion to Catholicism and priesthood ==
After this, Alexander Cameron travelled on a Grand Tour throughout Europe. After arriving in the Papal States, Alexander Cameron stayed at the Palazzo Muti in Rome, the home and the government in exile of Prince James Francis Edward Stuart, which was said to have an enormous influence upon his future spiritual development.

During his time in Rome, Alexander Cameron converted to Catholicism. A 1730 letter by Alexander Cameron from Boulogne to his brother, Donald Cameron of Lochiel, and which was first published in a 1994 issue of the Innes Review, attributes his conversion solely to the influence of their uncle Allan Cameron, a fellow household servant of the Prince and Princess who had played a great part in the Jacobite rebellion of 1715. Alexander Cameron explained elsewhere that, while in Rome, he had expressed his desire to become a Catholic to the Stuart king and queen in exile. Both Prince James Francis Edward and Princess Maria Clementina were reportedly overjoyed and immediately arranged for their household servant's instruction and reception into the Catholic Church.

Cameron wrote a 48 page memorandum on his conversation which is now preserved at the National Library of Scotland, while the shorter letter that accompanied the memorandum remains in the Clan Cameron museum in Achnacarry Castle. The value is increased as they are both among the few Lochiel family papers to have "somehow survived the hurried dispersal of papers, plate, and furniture from Achnacarry on the approach of Cumberland's troops after Culloden."

=== Seminary studies ===
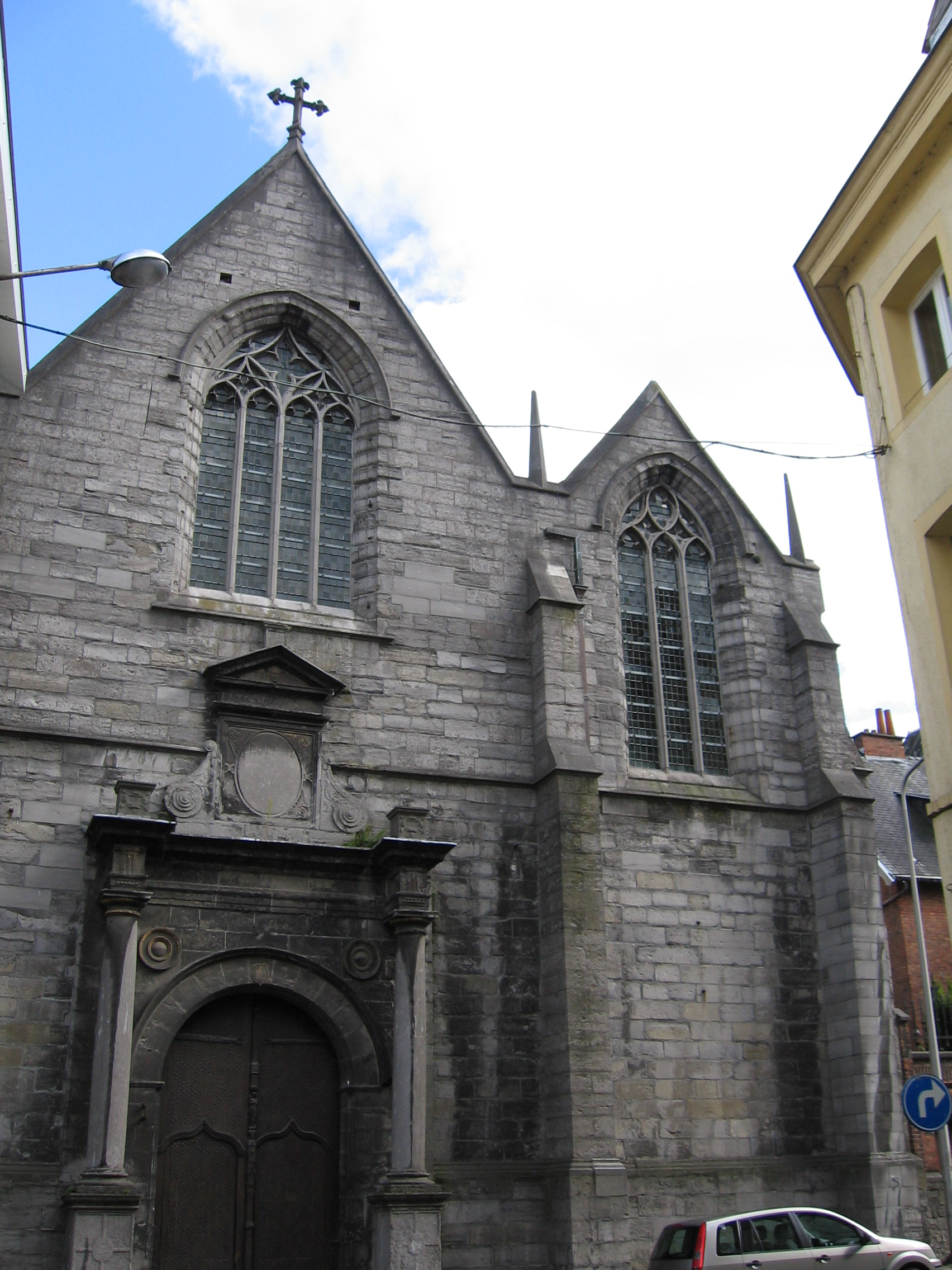
The Jesuit Church in Tournai where Alexander Cameron made his vows in 1736

Alexander Cameron entered the Society of Jesus at Tournai on 30 September 1734 and took his first vows there on 1 October 1736. He then studied theology for four years at Douai and did his tertianship for seven months at Armentières. Although the precise date remains unknown, it is known that Alexander Cameron was ordained a Roman Catholic priest in 1740 and, despite the risk of criminal prosecution for violating the Papal Jurisdiction Act 1560, he returned to his native Scotland in June 1741.

=== The cave in Glen Cannich ===
Alexander Cameron lived with and shared his priestly ministry in Strathglass with two fellow Jesuits whom he had first met as fellow seminarians in Douai. John Farquharson (Scottish Gaelic: Maighstir Iain, an-tAthair Iain Mac Fhearchair) was a veteran "heather priest" and early collector of local Scottish Gaelic literature. He often travelled disguised in a kilt and tartan hose to evade capture by the priest hunters. They were also joined by Charles Farquharson (Scottish Gaelic: Maighstir Teàrlach, an t-Athair Teàrlach Mac Fhearchair), Maighstir Iain's brother.

Even reports from anti-Catholic sources confirm that Alexander Cameron was very successful as a missionary in the country of Clan Chisholm and Clan Fraser. In a 27 April 1743 report from Dingwall (Scottish Gaelic: Inbhir Pheofharain) to the General Assembly of the Church of Scotland, local Presbyterian ministers noted that Cameron, who "hath lately settled in the part of Strathglass that pertains to Lord Lovet, and is employed as a Popish Missionary in that neighbourhood and Glenstrathfarrar, and trafficks with great success... the Presbytery do find that a greater number have been perverted to Popery in these parts within the last few months than thirty years before.

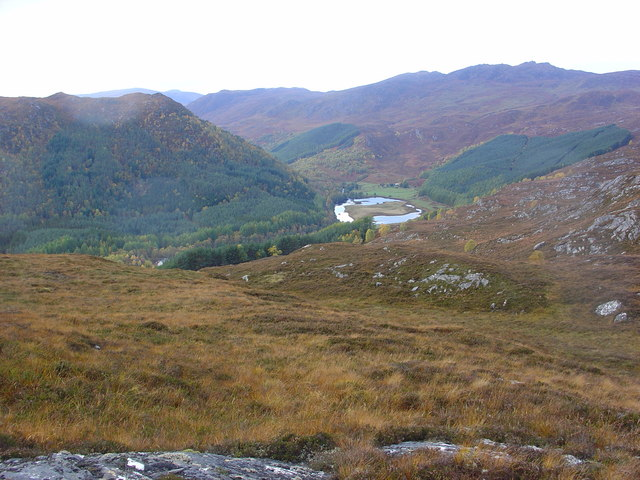
Loch Craskie in Glen Cannich, from the southeast.

The three priests' former residence and secret Mass house, which was located inside a cave still referred to as (Scottish Gaelic: Glaic na h'eirbhe, lit. "the hollow of the hard-life"), and which was located underneath the cliff of a big boulder at Brae of Craskie, near Beauly (Scottish Gaelic: A' Mhanachainn) in Glen Cannich (Scottish Gaelic: Gleann Chanaich). Odo Blundell considered Colin Chisholm's sources of information to be credible and used his article as a source. When Cameron's conversion letter was first published in a 1994 issue of Innes Review, Wynne commented about the cave dwelling, "It was in the nature of a summer shieling (Scottish Gaelic: Àirigh), a command centre for monitoring the traditional activities of cattle reivers; as such it combined a civilising role with the building up of a Catholic mission outside Cameron territory in a way which must have reassured Lochiel on both counts." Cameron caught what is believed to have been pneumonia and almost died at this residence due to its coldness, but still refused to retreat to Beaufort Castle because he considered it his priestly duty to minister to the people of Glen Cannich throughout the winter. On 26 January 1743, Lord Lovat, a practicing Catholic whose changes of allegiance attracted the nickname "the Fox" (Scottish Gaelic: an t-Sionnach), wrote from Beaufort Castle to Lochiel, begging him to order his brother to the castle, where Lovat promised to "furnish him with all the conveniences of Life". Lovat further pleaded with Lochiel, saying, "I beg you to use your endeavours to get an order from his superiors to make him remove to a milder climate; they cannot in honor and conscience refuse it, for he has done already more good to his Church than any ten of his profession has done these ten years past, except your uncle (Bishop Hugh MacDonald) who is so famous for making converts." Cameron still refused to go. Later, encountering difficulties with the authorities over his religious work, Cameron is then known to have sought and received the protection of his eldest brother at Achnacarry Castle in Lochaber.

== Jacobite rising of 1745 ==
(Scottish Gaelic: An bratach bhàn), the Jacobite Standard of the 1745 Uprising.

Alexander Cameron is believed to have been present when Bishop MacDonald, in violation of strict orders from the Congregation for the Propaganda of the Faith to maintain an apolitical stance, blessed the Jacobite Army standard before its raising at Glenfinnan. Afterwards, he was one of the priests of the Highland district whom the bishop reluctantly assigned as military chaplains with a captain's rank. According to the muster roll, Donald Cameron of Lochiel's regiment had three chaplains: non-jurant and unregistered Presbyterian minister John Cameron of Fort William, non-jurant Episcopalian rector Duncan Cameron of Fortingall, and Catholic priest Alexander Cameron, "brother to Lochiel". Cameron's other brother, Dr. Archibald Cameron of Lochiel, appears in the muster as "ADC to the prince." Alexander Cameron's duties would have involved saying Mass, administering the sacraments, and caring on the battlefield for the wounded and dying, rather than fighting during the Jacobite rising of 1745.

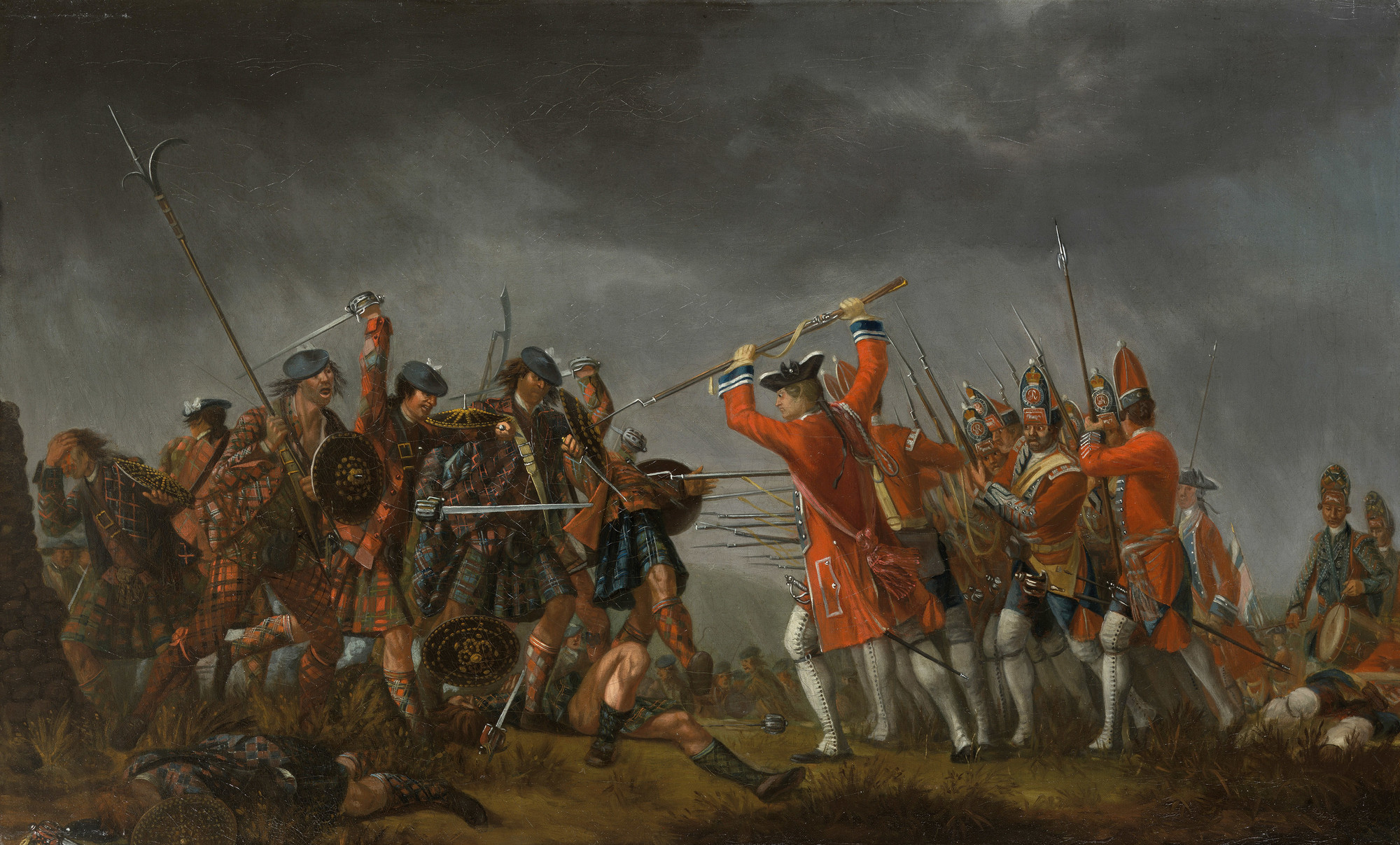
David Morier's depiction of the 1745 Battle of Culloden – An Incident in the Rebellion of 1745

On the evening before the Battle of Culloden, Cameron offered the Tridentine Mass on the battlefield for the Catholics of his regiment, while wearing a tartan chasuble.

=== After the Battle of Culloden ===
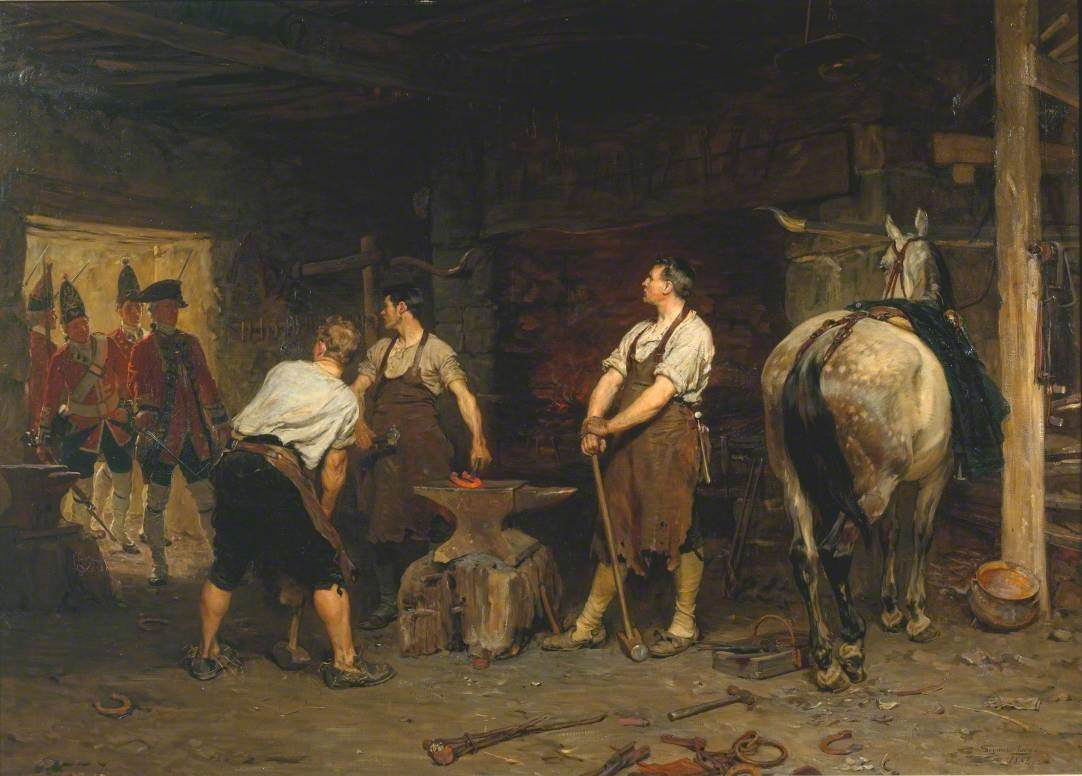
After Culloden, Rebel Hunting by John Seymour Lucas depicts the rigorous search for Jacobites during (Scottish Gaelic: Bliadhna nan Creach "The Year of the Pillaging").

After the battle, Alexander Cameron is likely to have remained with his brothers Donald and Dr. Archibald Cameron for at least part of their flight from the field of Culloden. According to Lochiel's own written report to Louis XV, after being wounded and carried from the battlefield, he and those who travelled with him had gone first to the house of their relative, Ewen MacPherson of Cluny. Furthermore, Thomas Wynne believes that Alexander Cameron was one of those who barely escaped arrest when government troops surprised a secret clan gathering called by Lochiel near Achnacarry Castle on 15 May 1746, before going back into hiding. On 28 May 1746, government soldiers from Bligh's Regiment, under the command of Lt.-Col. Edward Cornwallis, and the Independent Highland Company, commanded by George Munro, 1st of Culcairn, burned Alexander Cameron's birthplace of Achnacarry Castle to the ground.

His biographer Thomas Wynne believes Alexander Cameron fled from Achnacarry Castle to Borrodale Bay, and then remained in hiding along the Atlantic coast, near Morar and Arisaig.

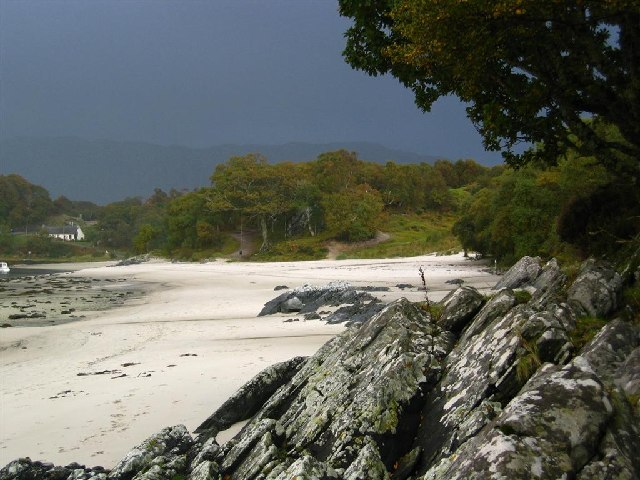
The sands at Morar.

Alexander Cameron was subsequently arrested and delivered by Captain MacNiel over to Royal Navy Captain John Fergussone (c.1708-1767), whose ship, H.M.S. Furnace, was then off the isle of Raasay (Scottish Gaelic: Ratharsair) and allegedly unleashing total war against the island's population, in consequence for the Laird having briefly harboured the Prince. The Anderson journal, which states that the Jesuit arrived with four fellow prisoners, two of whom were from Clan MacKinnon and shared accurate information about the prince's planned movements, also gives Alexander Cameron's date of arrival on board as 12 July 1746.

=== HMS Furnace ===
As a newly arrived prisoner aboard HMS Furnace, Cameron joined James Grant of Barra, Lord Lovat, Captain Félix O'Neille y O'Neille, the 70-year old chief of Clan MacKinnon, the Clan MacLeod Laird of Raasay, the two men who smuggled Prince Charles Edward from Skye to Morar, all 38 Jacobite Army veterans from Eigg, briefly Flora MacDonald, and many other priests.

By late August 1746, when the Furnace, with its many "wretched prisoners", was riding at anchor in Tobermory, while awaiting orders from Commodore Thomas Smith to withdraw completely from The Minch, Alexander Cameron had fallen seriously ill and complaints were duly made about John Fergussone's treatment of Lochiel's brother to senior officers in the British armed forces. In response to these complaints, Lord Albemarle, who had replaced the Duke of Cumberland as British Army Commander in Chief for Scotland, assigned a doctor to visit the prisoners aboard HMS Furnace. After the doctor, "returned and said if Mr. Cameron was not brought ashore or was better assisted he must die soon by neglect and ill-usage", Lord Albemarle immediately sent a party aboard "with an order to Ferguson to deliver up Mr. Cameron". In reply, Captain Fergussone, "said he was his prisoner and he would not deliver him up to any person without an express order from the Duke of Newcastle or the Lords of the Admiralty". Other friends of the priest then attempted to deliver proper bedding and "other necessities" to the Furnace, but Captain Fergussone, "swore if they offered to put them on board he would sink them and their boat directly. The Captain soon afterwards sailed..."

As HMS Furnace sailed around the North of Scotland via Inverness towards London, each prisoner was to be given a daily ration of 1/2 lbs. of food, "brought in foul nasty buckets", and into which, according to survivors, Fergussone's crew occasionally used to urinate, "as an ill-natured diversion". Due to severe overcrowding, however, even this ration of food was often diluted with seawater. The dead and even emaciated prisoners who were still dying were taken out of the hold and thrown into the sea.

== Death and burial ==
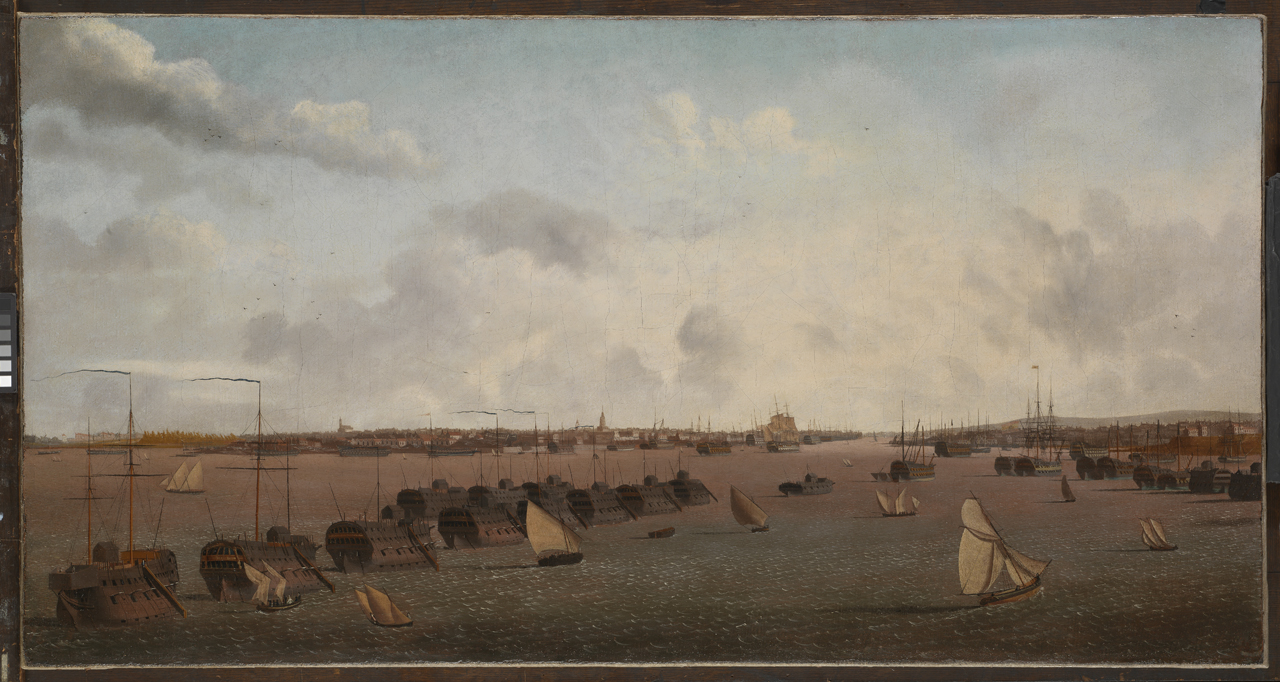
Portsmouth Harbour with Prison Hulks, painted by French corsair and survivor of eight years incarceration aboard Royal Navy prison hulks Ambroise Louis Garneray (1783-1857).

By the time HMS Furnace finally reached the Thames and anchored off the coast of Gravesend as a prison hulk for those too ill to be transferred elsewhere or transported to the British West Indies for sale to the sugar planters, Cameron was already near death. Historians John Watts and Maggie Craig have both alleged that Alexander Cameron was first removed from the Furnace, imprisoned at Inverness Gaol, and then transported to the River Thames aboard a different prison ship. His sister in law, Mrs. Jean Cameron of Dungallon, also alleges that Alexander Cameron remained aboard HMS. Furnace both during and after the voyage to the Thames.

Cameron died, after first receiving Holy Communion and the Last Rites, and with Farquarson by his side on 19 October 1746. Cameron's remains were taken ashore and buried in unconsecrated ground in the nearest graveyard to the ship: the Church of England cemetery attached to St George's Church, Gravesend, which also holds the grave of Pocahontas. Alexander Cameron is believed to rest in an unmarked singular or mass grave whose location in the churchyard cannot be precisely determined.

== Legacy ==
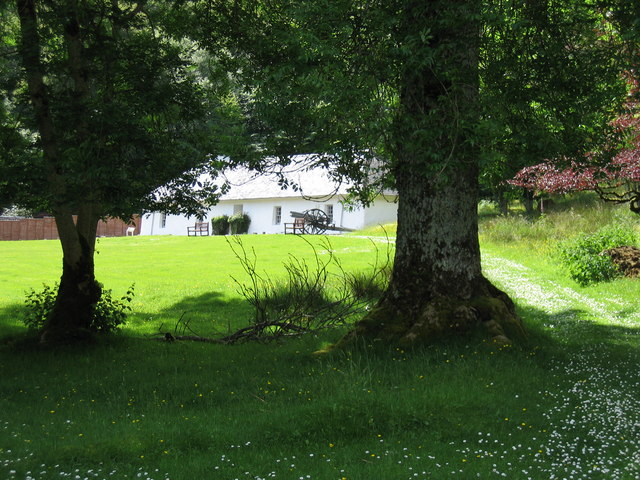
The Clan Cameron Museum at Achnacarry Castle in Lochaber.

Part of the tartan chasuble that Cameron wore during Mass on the eve of the Battle of Culloden was donated to the Roman Catholic Diocese of Argyll and the Isles following Catholic emancipation in 1829 by Angus John Campbell, 20th hereditary captain of Dunstaffnage Castle. It is preserved as a relic in the manse of St Columba's Cathedral in Oban, and has been on loan to the Clan Cameron Museum at Achnacarry Castle in Lochaber since 2011.

Cameron also appears in a 1927-1929 tapestry commissioned by John Crichton-Stuart, 4th Marquess of Bute entitled The Prayer for Victory, Prestonpans 1745 by William Skeoch Cummings. The tapestry depicts the Cameron Regiment of the Jacobite Army kneeling in prayer before the Battle of Prestonpans. Cameron is shown genuflecting in the left.

In 2011,Monsignor Thomas Wynne (1930 - 2020), a priest of the Roman Catholic Diocese of Argyll and the Isles long assigned to St. Margaret's Church in Roybridge (Scottish Gaelic: Drochaid Ruaidh), Lochaber, self-published a book-length biography of Cameron, "The Forgotten Cameron of the '45: The Life and Times of Alexander Cameron S.J.".

== General references ==
- Wynne, Thomas (2011). The Forgotten Cameron of the '45: The Life and Times of Alexander Cameron, S.J. Thomas Wynne. (Wynne 2011 in citations below).
- Forbes, Robert (1895). Paton, Henry (ed.). The Lyon in mourning : or, A collection of speeches, letters, journals etc. relative to the affairs of Prince Charles Edward Stuart. Edinburgh, Printed at the University press by T. and A. Constable for the Scottish history society.
  - Volume 1 (Forbes vol. 1 in citations below)
  - Volume 2 (Forbes vol. 2 in citations below)
  - Volume 3 (Forbes vol. 3 in citations below)
- Blundell, Frederick Odo (1909). The Catholic Highlands of Scotland: the Central Highlands. Vol. 1. Edinburgh: Sands. (Blundell 1909 in citations below).
- Blundell, Frederick Odo (1917). The Catholic Highlands of Scotland: the Western Highlands and Islands. Vol. 2. Edinburgh: Sands. (Blundell 1917 in citations below).
- Forbes-Leith, William (1909). Memoirs of Scottish Catholics during the XVIIth and XVIIIth centuries. London: Longmans, Green. (Forbes-Leith 1909 in citations below).
