= Lord Cameron =

Lord Cameron or Baron Cameron may refer to:

== Lord Cameron ==
=== Baron Cameron ===
- Neil Cameron, Baron Cameron of Balhousie (1920–1985), Chief of the Defence Staff
- David Cameron, Baron Cameron of Chipping Norton (born 1966), Conservative Prime Minister
- Ewen Cameron, Baron Cameron of Dillington (born 1949), crossbench peer
- Kenneth Cameron, Baron Cameron of Lochbroom (1931–2025), Lord Advocate
- Donald Cameron, Baron Cameron of Lochiel (born 1976), Scottish Conservative politician

=== Senator of the College of Justice ===
- John Cameron, Lord Abernethy (born 1938), Scottish judge
- John Cameron, Lord Cameron (1900–1996), Scottish judge
- John Cameron, Lord Coulsfield (1934–2016), Scottish judge

== Lords of Cameron ==
- Lord Fairfax of Cameron

== Other Lords named Cameron ==
- John Cameron, Lord Lochiel (1663–1747), Scottish Jacobite nobleman and Chief of Clan Cameron
- Lord Angus Cameron, a fictional character from the 1919 film The White Heather

== See also ==
- Cameron Cobbold, 1st Baron Cobbold (1904–1987), Lord Chamberlain
- Chiefs of Clan Cameron
- Cornelius Cameron, Lord Mayor of Nottingham
- Donald Angus Cameron of Lochiel (1946–2013), Lord Lieutenant of Inverness-shire and Chief of Clan Cameron
- Lady Cameron
