= Alan Cameron of Erracht =

Scottish British Army officer

Lieutenant-General Sir Alan Cameron of Erracht KCB
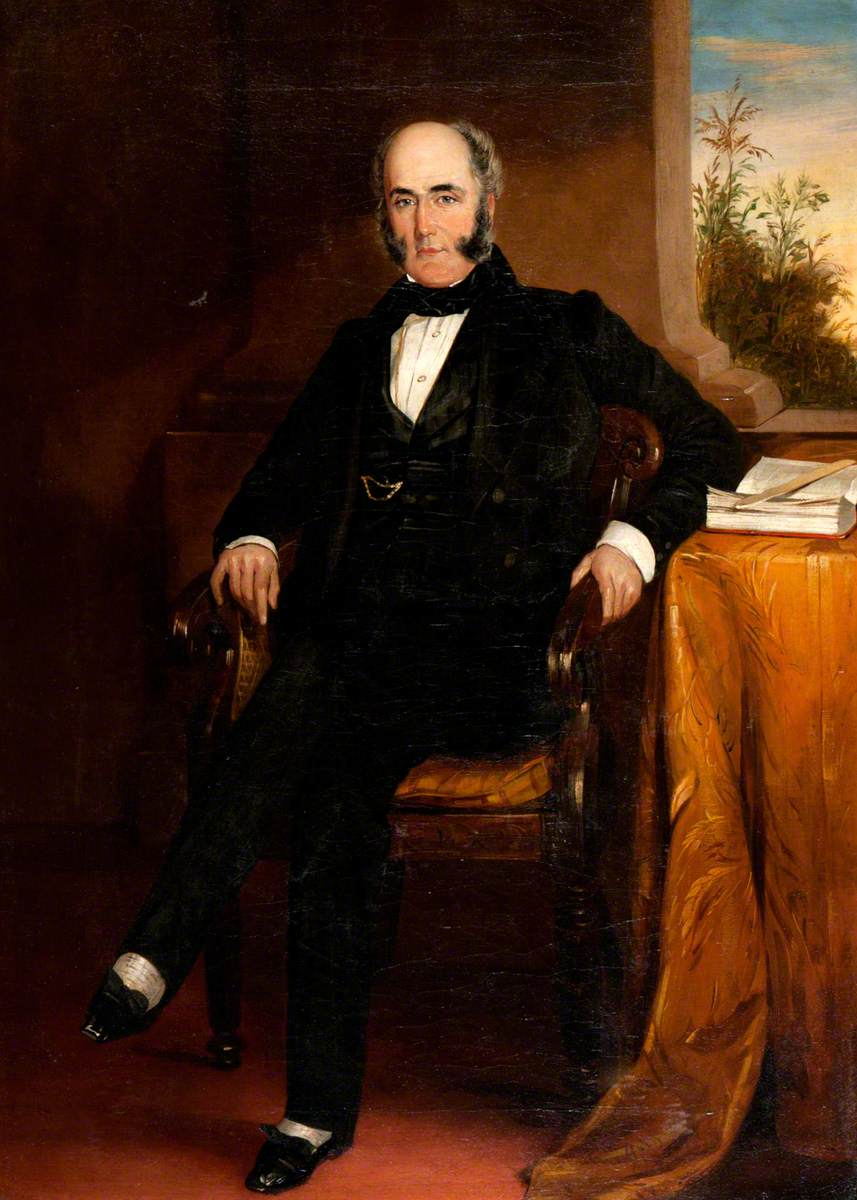
- Portrait of Cameron, c. 1820
- Born: 1753; Banavie, Scotland
- Died: 9 March 1828 (aged 74–75); Fulham, England
- Education: University of St Andrews
- Spouse: Ann Philips (m. 1779–1795)
- Military career
- Allegiance: United Kingdom
- Branch: British Army
- Service years: 1775–1828
- Rank: Lieutenant-General
- Nickname: Old Cia Mar Tha
- Unit: 79th Regiment of Foot
- Conflicts: American Revolutionary War (POW); French Revolutionary Wars; Flanders campaign; West Indies campaign; Anglo-Russian Invasion of Holland; Battle of Alkmaar (WIA); Ferrol Expedition; Egypt campaign; Battle of Alexandria; Napoleonic Wars; Copenhagen Expedition; Peninsular War; Second Battle of Porto; Battle of Talavera; Battle of Bussaco
- Awards: Army Gold Medal

Lieutenant-General Sir Alan Cameron of Erracht KCB (1753 – 9 March 1828) was a Scottish British Army officer who, at his own expense in 1793, raised the 79th Regiment of Foot (Cameron Highlanders).

== Background ==
Born near Banavie in Lochaber in 1753, Cameron of Erracht was the eldest son of Donald Cameron of Erracht and Marjorie, daughter of MacLean of Drimmin, who was killed at the Battle of Culloden. It was not until he was 4 years old that he first met his father. Aged 16, he killed someone in a duel and as a result was forced to join volunteers proceeding to North America.

== Military career ==
Described as being of "Herculean build" and bearing a "fiery but chivalrous disposition", Cameron enlisted in a Loyalist cavalry corps at the outbreak of the American Revolutionary War. However, he was captured by American Patriots in 1775 and held as a prisoner of war for two years in Philadelphia, Pennsylvania. Cameron injured himself in attempting to escape, only to be later released in exchange. He returned to Scotland in 1784.

After war was declared with revolutionary France in 1793, Cameron raised the 79th Regiment of Foot and was accepted as its colonel (although his army rank still appears to be no more than major at this point). Erracht was unusual in that every other Highland regiment was raised by Clan Chiefs, while he was merely chieftain of a cadet branch (albeit a senior branch) of the Cameron clan, led by Lochiel. In the 1790s a rift occurred with "the rogue" Lochiel over the borrowing and evictions of Cameron lands, including Erracht, leading to a period of enmity between the two. Nevertheless, he would acquire great influence and respect in the glens of Lochaber.

He commanded the regiment when it joined the forces of the Duke of York in the Flanders Campaign 1794, and during the retreat through Holland 1795. From 1795 to 1797 the regiment was in the West Indies and served at Martinique. Cameron was promoted lieutenant-colonel in 1796. Devastated by fever, the 79th was eventually withdrawn from the West Indies and rebuilt in Guernsey 1798. Cameron again served under York in the Anglo-Russian invasion of Holland in 1799. The 79th was in garrison in Houat in 1800, then joined Sir Ralph Abercromby's expedition to Egypt and Minorca in 1801. A second battalion was raised in 1804. Cameron was confirmed as colonel of 79th Foot on 1 January 1805. In 1807 he led his regiment in the expedition against Copenhagen under Cathcart.

Cameron joined the army in the Peninsular in late 1808, as a brigadier-general commanding the 2nd Brigade of Rowland Hill's 3rd Division in Portugal, collecting stragglers from Moore's army. Under Wellesley from 1809, his brigade saw action at Oporto 12 May, then became the 2nd Brigade of Sherbrooke's 1st Division, fighting at Talavera 28 July, and at Busaco 27 September 1810. He was promoted major general on 25 July 1810 and invalided home.

Cameron was noted for his outspoken eccentricity. When asked his opinion on the idea of replacing kilts with trews in the Highland regiments he responded famously and at length against it. When the 95th Rifles were added to make up his brigade in late 1808: "On hearing that our four companies were to be put under his command, this gallant but eccentric old chieftain declared, 'he did not want a parcel of riflemen, as he already had a thousand Highlanders, who would face the devil.' Had our corps been raised northward of the Tweed, it is more probable that our brigadier would have set a higher value on us; but we were moved to another brigade before he had an opportunity of judging of the merits or demerits of the Southerners in the field".

Cameron became a Knight of the Bath in 1815 and was promoted to lieutenant-general in 1819. He died in London in March 1828.

Military offices
Preceded by New post	Colonel of the 79th Regiment of Foot (Cameronian Volunteers); 1793–1828	Succeeded by Ronald Craufurd Ferguson
