= St George's Church, Gravesend =

Anglican church in Kent, United Kingdom

Coordinates: 51.44410°N 0.36850°E

Church at Gravesend Act 1730
- Act of Parliament
- Parliament of Great Britain
- Long title: An Act for re-building the Parish Church of Gravesend, in the County of Kent, as One of the Fifty New Churches directed to be built by Two Acts of Parliament, One made in the Ninth, and the other in the Tenth, Year of the Reign of Her late Majesty Queen Anne.
- Citation: 4 Geo. 2. c. 20
- Territorial extent: Great Britain

Dates
- Royal assent: 7 May 1731
- Commencement: 8 December 1720 (Note: Start of session.)
Other legislation
Relates to	New Churches in London and Westminster Act 1710; Churches in London and Westminster Act 1711

Status: Current legislation

Text of statute as originally enacted

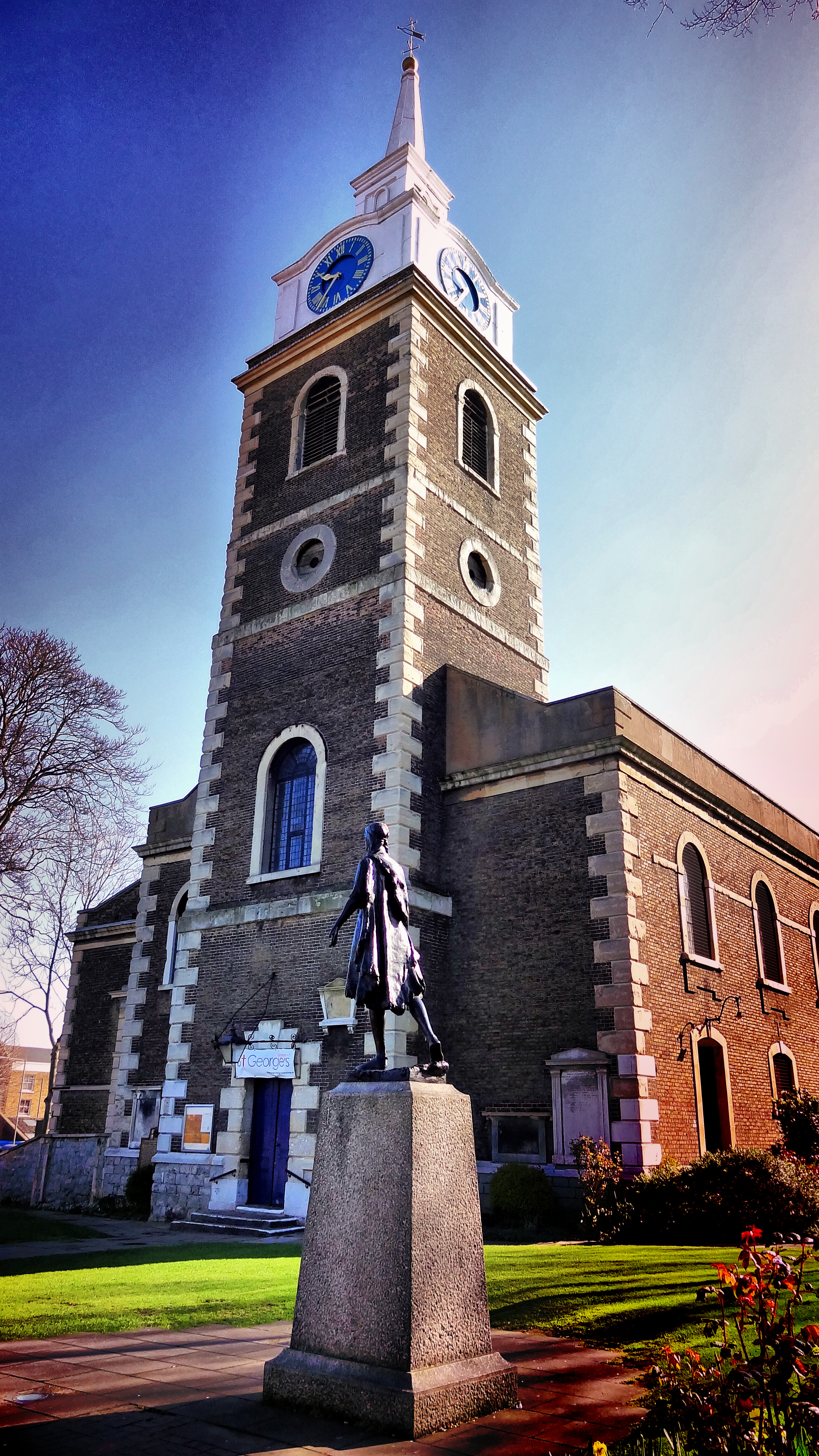
St George's church with the Pocahontas statue in the foreground

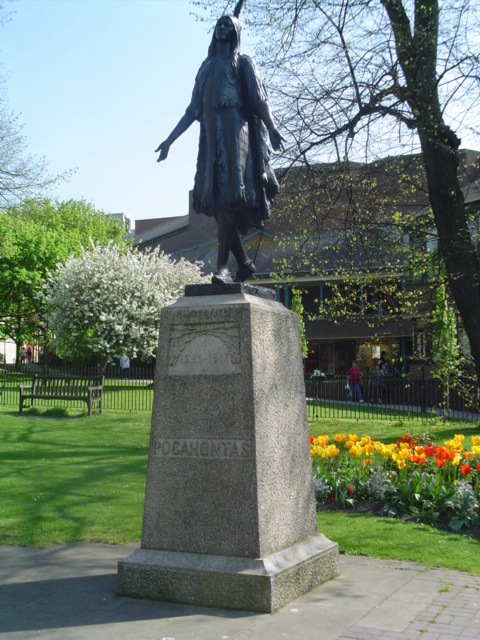
Statue of Pocahontas

St George's Church, Gravesend, is a Grade II*-listed Anglican church dedicated to Saint George the patriarch of England, which is situated near the foot of Gravesend High Street in the Borough of Gravesham. It serves as Gravesend's parish church and is located in the diocese of Rochester in Kent, England.

== Burials ==
Pocahontas, a Native American woman who was brought to England, died in Gravesend. Aged 20 or 21, she died on her way back to North America accompanied by her husband, English-born colonist John Rolfe, and their son, Thomas. She was buried under the chancel of St. George's Church on 21 March 1617. When the church was rebuilt in 1731, the exact spot was lost. William Ordway Partridge's bronze statue commemorates her.

After the Battle of Culloden in 1746, the many Jacobite Army POWs who died because of the inhumane conditions aboard the prison hulks anchored off Gravesend in the River Thames are believed to have been buried as "unknowns" in what was then the unconsecrated area of St. George's Cemetery. The most well known such burial is that of former non-combatant military chaplain and Roman Catholic Martyr Fr. Alexander Cameron, the younger brother of Donald Cameron of Lochiel.
