= Donald Cameron, 23rd Lochiel =

Scottish clan chief

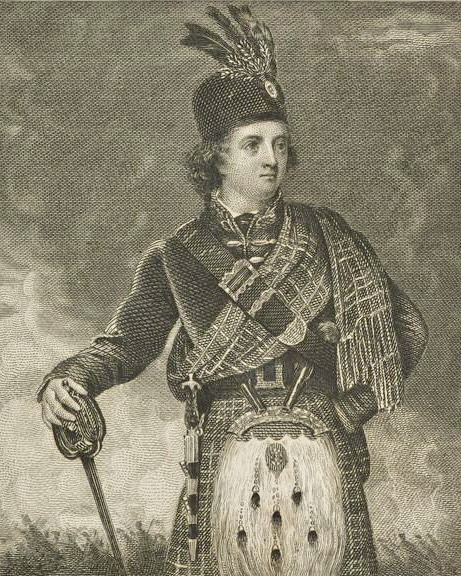
Cameron of Lochiel by William Home Lizars

Captain Donald Cameron of Lochiel, DL (25 September 1796 – 2 December 1858) was a Scottish soldier, distinguished in the Waterloo campaign, and the 23rd Chief of Clan Cameron.

== Biography ==
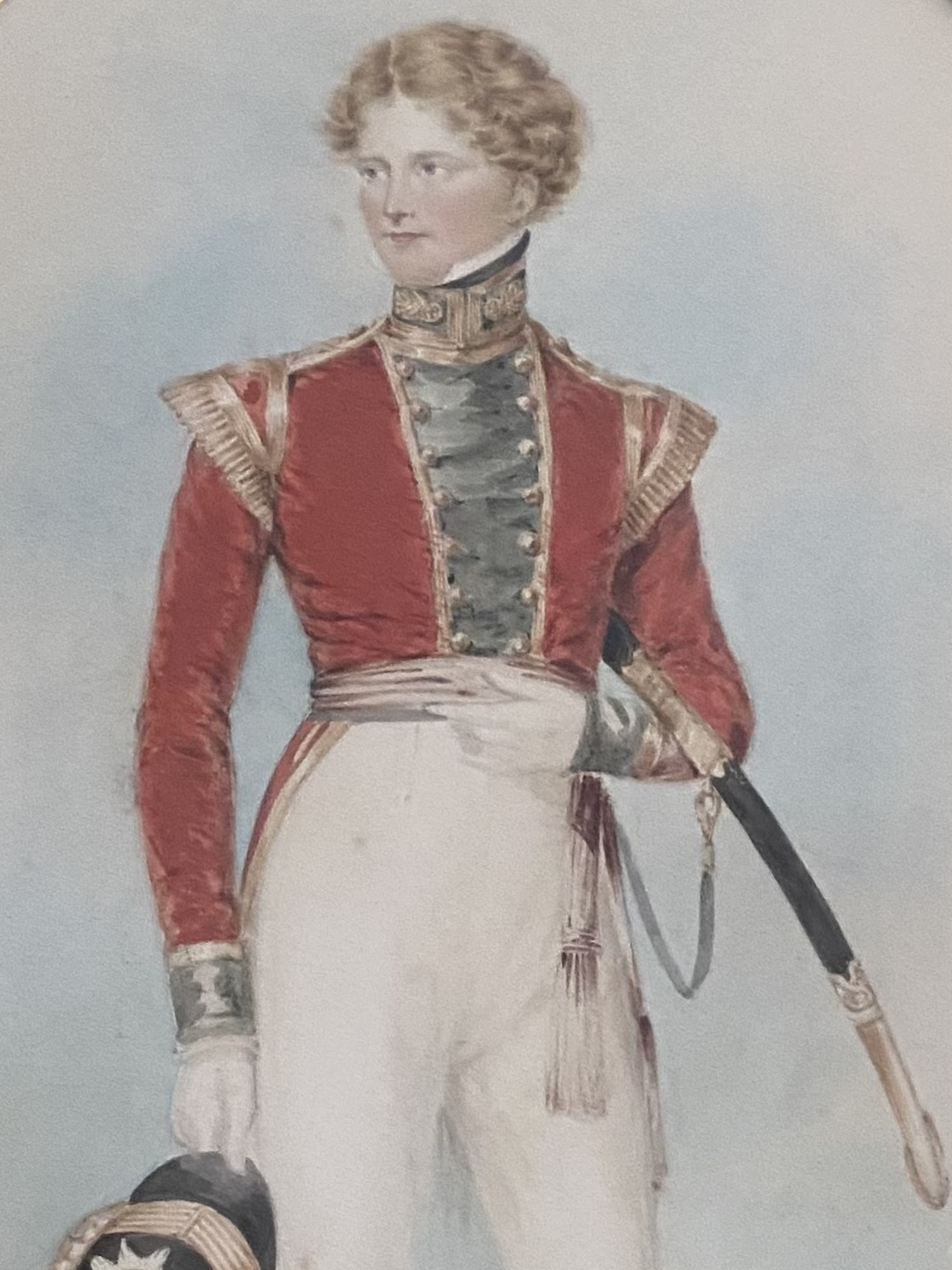
Miniature of Captain Cameron, of the Grenadier Guards

Donald Cameron was born on 25 September 1796 and baptised at Kilmallie, Lochaber. His father was Donald Cameron, 22nd Lochiel, who had the Cameron estates restored to him in 1784 and rebuilt Achnacarry Castle in the Scottish baronial style. His mother was Hon. Anne Abercromby (c. 1768–1844), eldest daughter of Lt.-Gen. Sir Ralph Abercromby and Mary Abercromby, 1st Baroness Abercromby (see Baron Abercromby). He was educated at Harrow.

In 1814, Cameron, younger of Lochiel, was commissioned as a Lieutenant in the Grenadier Guards. He was promoted to Captain in 1815, gaining the rank for distinguished service. He fought at the Battle of Waterloo on 18 June 1815, alongside his cousin John Cameron of Fassiefern, Colonel of the 92nd Regiment of Foot (Gordon Highlanders). He retired from the military service upon the death of his father in 1832. He held the office of Deputy lieutenant for Inverness-shire and Buckinghamshire and the position of 23rd Chief "Lochiel" of Clan Cameron.

== Family ==
On 31 July 1832, Lochiel married Lady Vere Catherine Louisa Hobart (1803–1888), the posthumous daughter of Hon. George Vere Hobart and his second wife Janet Maclean (a scion of the Macleans of Coll and Camerons of Glendessary), with whom he had the following children:

- Anne Louisa Cameron (1833–1864), died unmarried
- Donald Cameron, 24th Lochiel (1835–1905), who succeeded and married Lady Margaret Montagu Douglas Scott
- Julia Vere Cameron (1837–1921), married Maj.-Gen. Hugh Mackenzie
- George Hampden Cameron-Hampden (1840–1877), died unmarried
- Sibella Matilda Cameron (died 1890), married Rev. Henry Veitch of Eliock
- Albinia Mary Cameron (died 1861), died unmarried

== See also ==
- Chiefs of Clan Cameron
- Hampden House
