= Charles Cameron of Lochiel =

21st Chief of Clan Cameron

Arms of Cameron of Lochiel

Charles Cameron of Lochiel (c. 1747 – 31 August 1776) was a Scottish soldier and the 21st Lochiel of Clan Cameron. His father was Donald Cameron of Lochiel, known by the sobriquet Gentle Lochiel.

== Biography ==
Charles Cameron was born in Paris circa 1747, the son of Donald Cameron of Lochiel, 19th Lochiel, a prominent Jacobite chieftain who had been exiled following the 1745 rising. His godfather was Prince Charles Edward Stuart (Bonnie Prince Charlie). Having outlived his elder brothers, John Cameron, 20th Lochiel (died 1762) and James Cameron (died 1759), the latter having died fighting in the French and Indian War, Charles succeeded as the 21st Chief of Clan Cameron.

In 1767 while stationed at Gibraltar, Lochiel married Martha Marshall, the daughter of an English quartermaster. They had two sons; the eldest of whom, Donald Cameron, 22nd Lochiel (1769–1832), succeeded as chief, while Archibald Cameron was an East India Company merchant.

Lochiel served in the 78th Fraser Highlanders, having been allowed to return to Scotland, and was due to proceed to America in 1776 with his company to fight in the American Revolutionary War. However, upon arriving in Glasgow in August he died unexpectedly. The bells of the Tolbooth were rung in honour of the Gentle Lochiel.
