= Archibald Cameron of Lochiel =

Jacobite leader

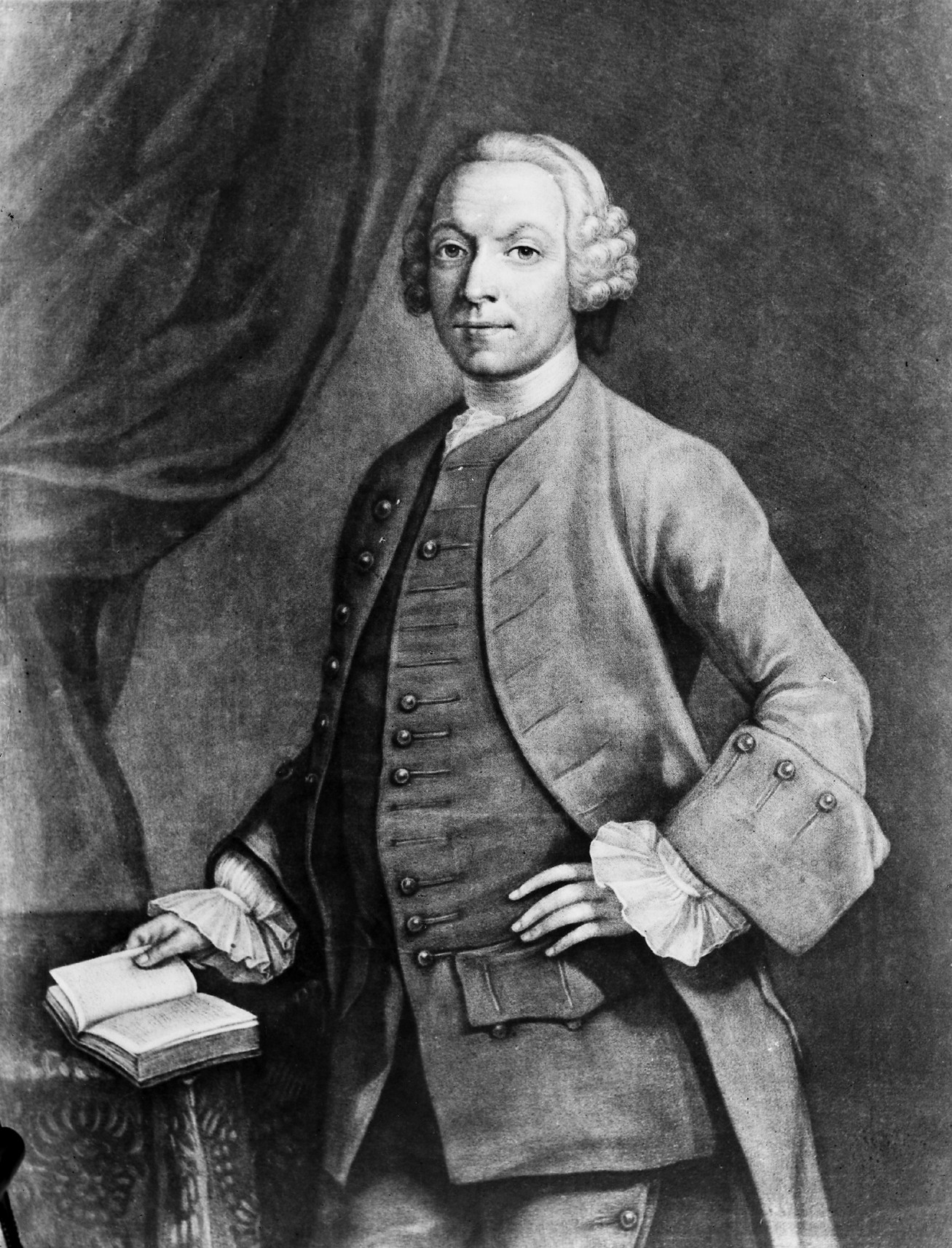
Mezzotint of Archibald Cameron

Archibald Cameron of Lochiel (1707 – 7 June 1753) was a Scottish physician, known for his involvement in the Jacobite rising of 1745, where he served as ADC to its leader, Charles Edward Stuart. Dr Cameron was the younger brother of landowner Donald Cameron of Lochiel, head of Clan Cameron and a key supporter of the rising, and of Roman Catholic priest Alexander Cameron.

Following the failure of the rising, Cameron escaped to France, where he was given a captaincy in the Royal-Ecossais regiment of Scots exiles. After secretly returning to Scotland in 1753, he was captured by the government and, at Tyburn, became the last Jacobite to be executed for high treason. He was eulogised in the Scottish Gaelic bardic poetry of the era and, in popular memory, he is sometimes referred to as Doctor Archie.

== Early life ==
Cameron arms

Archibald Cameron was born in 1707 at Achnacarry Castle, the sixth child (and third surviving son) of John Cameron, 18th chief of Clan Cameron, and Isobel, née Campbell.

His father, a committed Jacobite, participated in the failed 1715 Jacobite rising and, as a result, had become an exile, living first in Paris and then Boulogne. On the death of their grandfather Ewen Cameron of Lochiel in 1719 Archibald's elder brother Donald became acting clan chief and was accordingly styled as "Lochiel". Aside from Lochiel, Archibald's brothers included John Cameron of Fassiefern (1698–1785), Alexander Cameron (1701–1746), and Colony of Jamaica sugar planter Ewan Cameron.

Archibald initially attended the University of Glasgow to study law, before transferring to study medicine at the University of Edinburgh. He completed further studies at the Sorbonne in Paris and Leiden in the Netherlands. He subsequently returned to the Scottish Highlands, married within the clan to his Lochaber cousin, Jean Cameron of Dungallon, and fathered seven children.

== 1745 uprising ==
While Lochiel had been in contact with the exiled Stuart court, he had signed a declaration by senior Scots Jacobites urging Charles not to come to Scotland unless he brought at least 6,000 French troops; when Charles landed on Eriskay in July 1745 accompanied only by the Seven Men of Moidart, Lochiel initially refused to meet him. Archibald Cameron was sent to Loch nan Uamh to communicate the futility of the enterprise and persuade Charles to return to France.

Lochiel was nevertheless eventually persuaded to support a rising; his brother Fassiefern had earlier warned emotion would prevail over his judgement. This proved correct and Lochiel's decision to back Charles persuaded several others, including his cousin Ewen MacPherson of Cluny, who deserted from Loudon's Highlanders before Prestonpans. The process took over three weeks and Lochiel finally committed only when Charles gave him a personal guarantee for "the full value of his estate should the rising prove abortive," and Glengarry provided a written undertaking to raise the Macdonalds.

The ability of Lochiel and other clan chiefs to quickly mobilise large numbers of men derived from their wide-ranging powers over their tacksmen and tenants, including military service on demand. Those who refused were threatened with flogging or eviction, a process supervised by Archibald on his brother's behalf and which was allegedly a factor in his later betrayal by fellow Cameron clansmen when he returned to Scotland in March 1753. Archibald, who appears to have been given a commission as lieutenant colonel in his brother's regiment, first saw action in late August 1745, when he helped to lead an attack on Ruthven Barracks. A few sources depict him as a non-combatant who refused to offer more than his surgical skills during the rising, but some historians consider this very likely to be inaccurate since he was slightly wounded in action at the Battle of Falkirk in January 1746.

During the Battle of Culloden, Lochiel had his ankles broken by canister shot and Archibald was said to have been one of four men who carried him off the field, afterwards performing surgery on his brother's injuries.

== The Year of the Pillaging ==
Following defeat at Culloden, all three Cameron brothers became fugitives from government troops. After the burning of the family seat, Achnacarry House, the Cameron family hid at Badenoch; Robert Forbes later recorded that Cameron's wife and children "were behooved to take to the hills, no houses being left in the whole country about them. Mrs. Cameron said she never saw the Prince in his skulking, nor knew not where he was." In early July 1746, Archibald's elder brother Alexander was taken prisoner on the White Sands of Morar and died on 19 October 1746 after months of incarceration in unsanitary conditions aboard the prison hulk H.M.S. Furnace.

Despite government efforts to find Charles Stuart and other Jacobite fugitives, Archibald Cameron was sent to Loch Arkaig in September 1746 to escort Charles to the family's hiding place. The party then moved to Ben Alder, the seat of Lochiel's cousin Ewen MacPherson of Cluny, where word came that the French Royal Navy were waiting at Loch nan Uamh, and on this sixth attempt to find and rescue Charles ordered by the Comte de Maurepas, the French Minister of Marine, the whole party was finally evacuated to France on 19 September 1746.

== Betrayal and execution ==
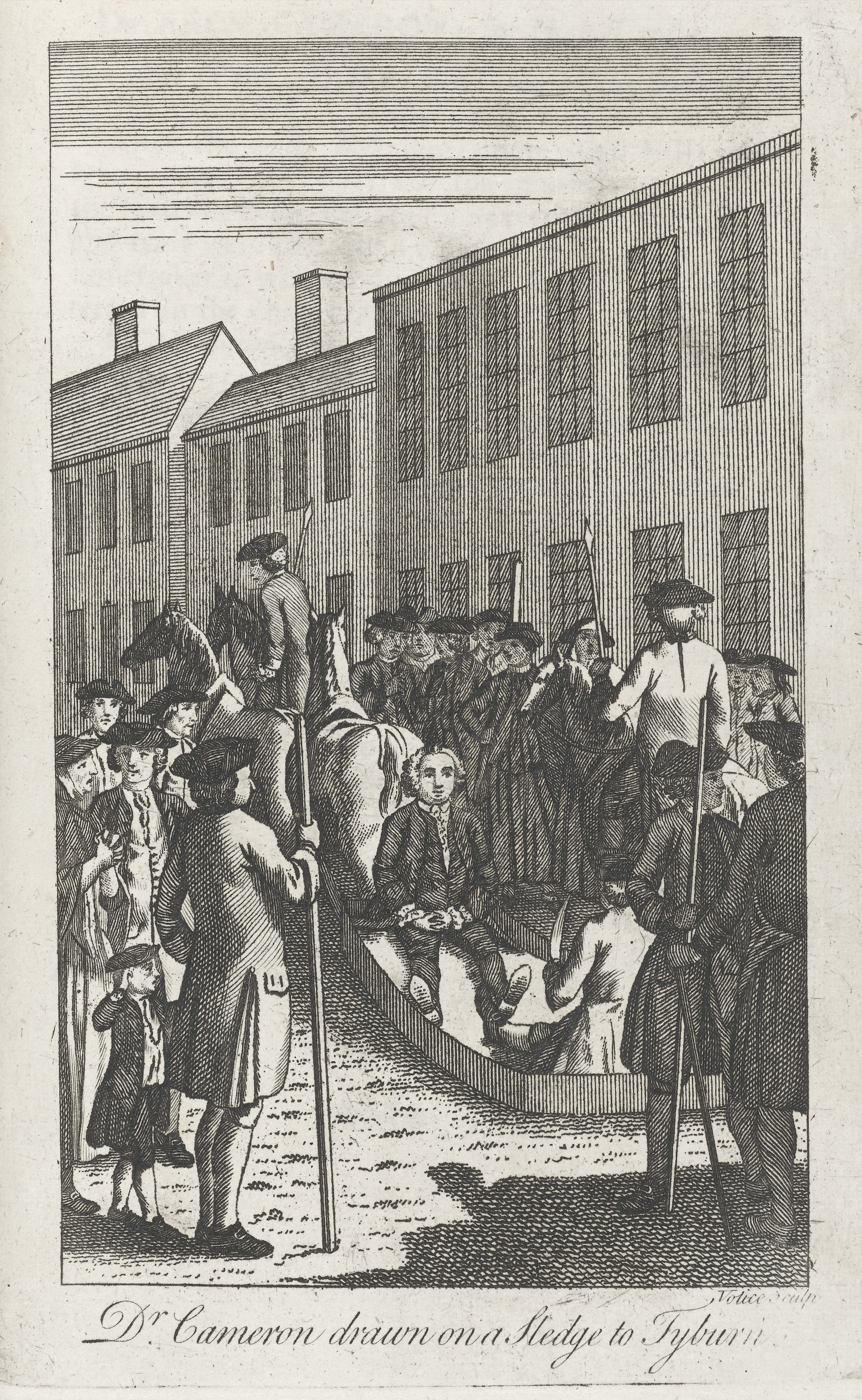
Anti-Jacobite broadside depicting Cameron being drawn on a sledge to Tyburn

In exile Cameron remained in Prince Charles's service, travelling with him to Madrid in 1748 and returning to Scotland privately in 1749. In 1753, he was sent back to Scotland once again to search for the missing Loch Arkaig treasure and to participate with Alexander Murray of Elibank in plans to abduct the royals from St James's Palace. Even though Prince Charles had refused to allow "the Elibank Plot" to turn into a decapitation strike of His Majesty's Government and expressly forbade the use of assassination against George II or any other senior members of the House of Hanover, while Dr Cameron was staying secretly at Brenachyle near Loch Katrine, his location was leaked to the government by Alastair Ruadh MacDonnell of Glengarry, the notorious "Pickle the spy", and members of Clan Cameron who by this time were sickened by his Jacobitism. For a long time, however, the source inside the Jacobite movement of Dr Cameron's betrayal was incorrectly believed to be Prince Charles' mistress, Clementina Walkinshaw, particularly as her sister was then a lady in waiting to the dowager Princess of Wales.

Archibald Cameron was arrested and, as he had already been attainted for high treason under the Attainder of Earl of Kellie and Others Act 1746 (19 Geo. 2, c. 26) for his part in the 1745 uprising, he was sentenced to execution without trial. He was imprisoned in Edinburgh Castle then taken to Tower Hill in London. His wife was pregnant with their eighth child at the time and was among those who begged in vain for a reprieve for the “gentle and humane” physician.

Over the four days before his execution, Dr. Cameron was spiritually counselled and prepared by James Falconar, a non-juring Scottish Episcopal clergyman resident in London, who had been held as a prisoner aboard the prison hulk HMS Furnace with the prisoner's late brother, Fr Alexander Cameron.

On 7 June 1753, Cameron was drawn on a sledge to Tyburn. He addressed the crowd before his death, "Sir, you see a fellow-subject just going to pay his last debt to his King and country. I the more cheerfully resign my life, as it is taken from me for doing my duty according to my conscience. I freely forgive all my enemies, and those who are instrumental in taking away my life. I thank God I die in charity with all mankind. As to my religion, I die a steadfast (tho' unworthy) member of that Church in which I have always lived, the Church of England, in whose communion I hope, thro' the merits of my blessed Saviour, for forgiveness of my sins, for which I am heartily sorry."

According to James Falconar, "Turning to the clergyman he said, 'I have now done with this world and am ready to leave it.' He joined heartily in the commendatory prayer, etc., then repeated some ejaculations out of the Psalms. After which he embraced the clergyman and took leave of him. As the clergyman was going down from the cart he had like to have missed the steps, which the Doctor observing, called out to him with a cheerful tone of voice, saying, 'Take care how you go. I think you don't know the way as well as I do.'"

Archibald Cameron was hanged for 20 minutes before being cut down and posthumously beheaded. James Falconer later wrote a detailed account of his death for non-juring bishop and historian Robert Forbes. Dr. Cameron's remains were buried in the Savoy Chapel, Westminster. He was the last Jacobite to receive the death penalty. In his final papers, written from prison, he still protested his undying loyalty to the House of Stuart and his non-juring Episcopalian principles.

Cameron was buried in the vaults of the Savoy Chapel, off the Strand in London. The Rev. John Wilkinson, who was thought to have Jacobite sympathies, was said to have paid the burial costs himself. There was previously a stained glass window to Cameron, but this was later destroyed. A brass plaque now records the event.

The clan's territory was being administered by Forfeited Estates Commission factor Mungo Campbell, whose perceived harshness was widely believed in Cameron country to have been at least part of what motivated Dr Cameron's involvement in the 1753 plot. In gratitude for his role in raising soldiers to fight for King George III during the American Revolution, the Lochiel estates were belatedly restored to Dr Archibald Cameron's grandnephew, Donald Cameron, 22nd Lochiel, under an Act of Amnesty in 1784. The 22nd Lochiel, however, went on to become quite notorious, both for financial extravagance and his role in the Highland Clearances in Clan Cameron country.

== Legacy ==
=== Assessment ===
Archibald Cameron is generally regarded as a benevolent figure; his betrayal and execution in 1753 was greatly lamented. According to James Browne in his work A History of the Highlands: "his fate was generally pitied". His benevolence is demonstrated by his having prevented the execution of prisoners after Prestonpans and for treating a wounded Hanoverian officer. It is not certain whether he ever took part in battle with some arguing that he probably did, while others insist he was a noncombatant and that his role was limited to being a physician. Furthermore, there was also perceived indignation surrounding the cruel method, and place of execution: Tyburn was the location for the executions of low-born criminals, whereas the nobility were traditionally executed at Tower Hill, where for example in 1747, Lord Lovat was beheaded.

There have been numerous proposals as to why Cameron was executed. Generally, it is thought that his overt attainder and execution served as a final warning to the Jacobite cause and any further attempts conceived. His own account given in his memoir is that it was "to cover the Cruelty of murdering me at [such a] Distance of Time from the passing of [the act of attainder]." According at least one 20th-century historian, the real reason for using an old bill of attainder as grounds to execute Dr Cameron without a formal trial was to protect the cover of Alastair Ruadh MacDonnell, the then-Tanist of Glengarry, as the highly damaging Hanoverian mole inside the Jacobite movement known as "Pickle the Spy".

Even so, Sir Walter Scott later commented that Dr. Cameron's execution, "threw much reproach upon the Government, and even upon the personal character of George II, as sullen, relentless, and unforgiving."

== In popular culture ==
- In 1753 John Cameron (Scottish Gaelic: An Taillear Mac Alasdair) of Dochanassie in Lochaber, composed (Scottish Gaelic: Òran d'on Doctair Chamshròn) "A Song to Doctor Cameron", an Aisling song in Gaelic in commemoration of Cameron's life and lamenting his absence from the clan's lands after his death. The Gaelic text of the poem and a parallel translation into English blank verse were included in John Lorne Campbell's groundbreaking volume Highland Songs of the Forty-Five.
- Cameron appears in D. K. Broster's novel The Flight of the Heron (1925), and is a leading character in its sequel The Gleam in the North (1927), which fictionalises the events leading up to his execution.

== Sources ==
- Gibson, John Sibbald (2004). "Cameron, Donald, of Lochiel". Oxford Dictionary of National Biography (Online ed.). Oxford University Press. doi:10.1093/ref:odnb/4438. (Subscription, Wikipedia Library access or UK public library membership required.)
- Gibson, John Sibbald (1994). Lochiel of the '45: the Jacobite Chief and the Prince. Edinburgh University Press. ISBN 978-0748605071.
- Kybett, Susan Maclean (1988). Bonnie Prince Charlie: A Biography. London: Unwin Hyman. ISBN 0044402139.
- Lenman, Bruce (1980). The Jacobite Risings in Britain 1689–1746. Methuen Publishing. ISBN 978-0413396501.
- Lord Elcho, David Wemyss (1907). A Short account of the affairs of Scotland in the years 1744, 1745, 1746. Edinburgh: David Douglas. OCLC 1033725714.
- Mackenzie, B. W. (1971). Dr. Archibald Cameron, Medical History. pp. 230–240.
- Riding, Jacqueline (2016). Jacobites: A New History of the 45 Rebellion. Bloomsbury. ISBN 978-1408819128.
- Scott, Sir Walter (1824). Redgauntlet.
- Stewart of Ardvorlich, John (1974). The Camerons: A History of Clan Cameron. Clan Cameron Association.
- Turner, Roger (2004). "Cameron, Archibald". Oxford Dictionary of National Biography (Online ed.). Oxford University Press. doi:10.1093/ref:odnb/4435. (Subscription, Wikipedia Library access or UK public library membership required.)
