= Donald Cameron, 22nd Lochiel =

Scottish landowner and clan chief (1769–1832)

Donald Cameron of Lochiel
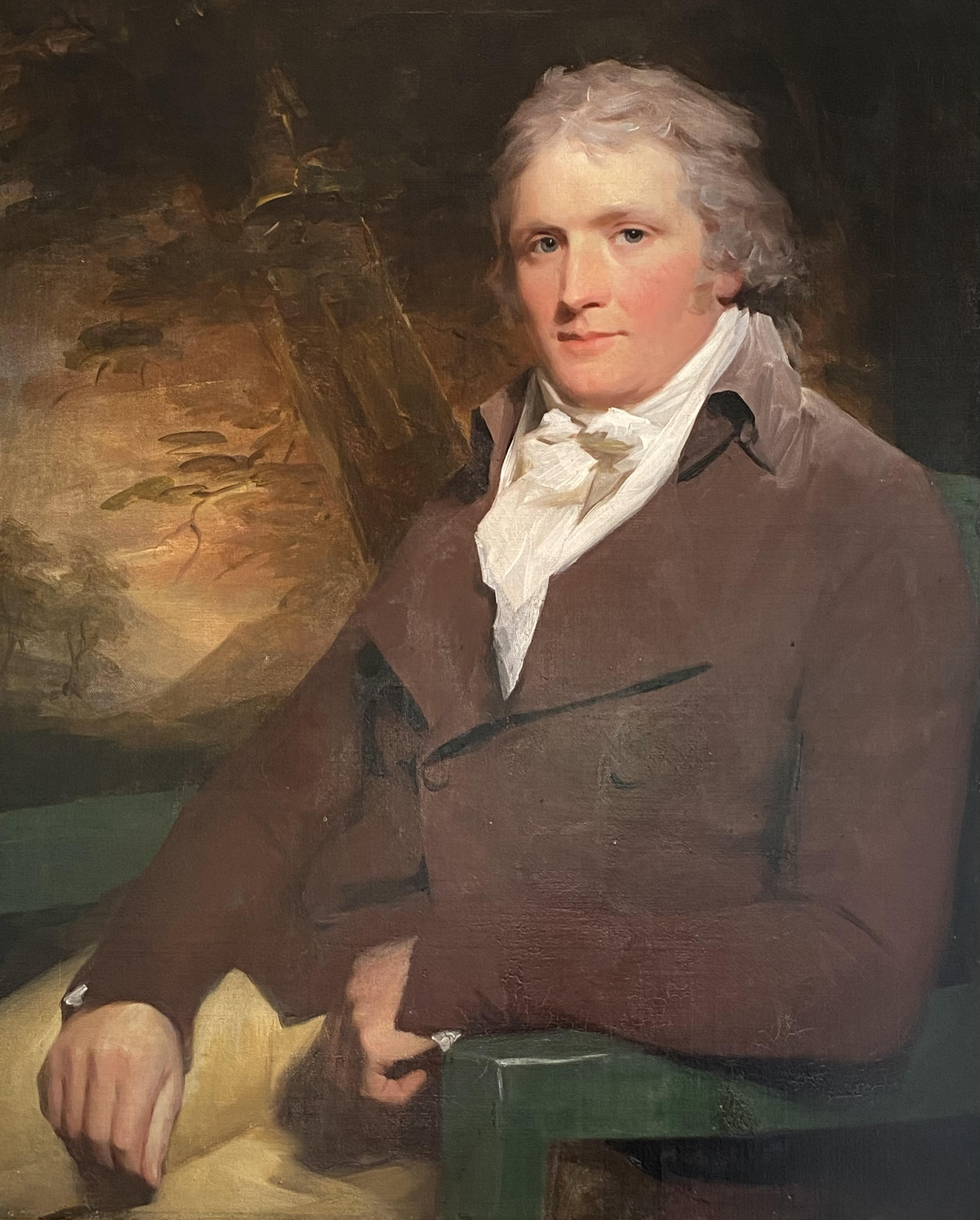
- Donald Cameron of Lochiel, 22nd Chief of Clan Cameron, by Henry Raeburn
- Born: October 22, 1769
- Died: September 14, 1832 (aged 62)
- Occupation: Chief of Clan Cameron
- Known for: His role in the Highland clearances

Donald Cameron of Lochiel (22 October 1769 – 14 September 1832) was a Scottish nobleman, landowner and the 22nd Chief of Clan Cameron. He is also remembered for his role in the Highland clearances.

== Biography ==
Born at Gibraltar, Donald Cameron was the eldest son of Charles Cameron, 21st Lochiel and Martha Marshall, daughter of Robert Marshall, quartermaster of the 30th Regiment of Foot. He spent his early years in London.

Following the Battle of Culloden, his grandfather The Gentle Lochiel (19th chief of the clan) went into exile and the Cameron lands were sequestrated by the government. Charles Cameron was allowed to return to Scotland, and lent his influence to the raising of the Lochiel men for the government service during the American War of Independence. In 1784, the estates of Cameron of Lochiel were restored under the general Act of Amnesty.

Lochiel travelled extensively on a Grand Tour of Europe and got into serious debt; and in order to raise money borrowed against some of the Cameron lands. In 1790, he visited Lochaber country for the first time. Shortly afterwards he disclosed to his guardians the deal he had done. They were most displeased. The deal was successfully challenged in court and declared null and void. As a result, the rogue Lochiel was judged unfit to manage the estate, which was handed over to a trust. In 1801, the trust began evicting tenants from the Cameron land. This was the beginning of the Cameron Clearances. Lochiel continued the evictions in 1819 when he regained control of the estate. Among those evicted was Sir Alan Cameron of Erracht, who raised the Queen's Own Cameron Highlanders. The families of Erracht and Lochiel were thus engaged in a minor feud for a time.

In 1802 Lochiel rebuilt Achnacarry Castle in the Scottish baronial style, designed by James Gillespie. He and his wife, The Hon. Anne Cameron of Lochiel, resided at Achnacarry until she eventually left him, being unhappy living in Lochaber. Estranged from his family, Lochiel spent the rest of his life in France, in residence at Toulouse where he died in 1832, aged 63.

== Family ==
In 1795, Lochiel married Hon. Anne Abercromby (c. 1768–1844), the eldest daughter of Lt.-Gen. Sir Ralph Abercromby and Mary Anne Abercromby, suo jure 1st Baroness Abercromby. They had four children:

- Donald Cameron, 23rd Lochiel (25 September 1796 – 2 December 1858), who succeeded and married Lady Vere Hobart
- Rev. Alexander Cameron (2 November 1806 – 1873), married Hon. Charlotte Rice, sister of the 5th Baron Dynevor, and had issue
- Mary Anne Cameron (1808 – 30 November 1850), married Rear Admiral Lord John Hay, son of the 7th Marquess of Tweeddale, without issue
- Matilda Cameron (1810–1894), died unmarried

== See also ==
- Chiefs of Clan Cameron
- Clan Cameron
