= Donald Cameron of Lochiel =

Scottish Jacobite and clan chief (c. 1695 – 1748)

- 19th Lochiel
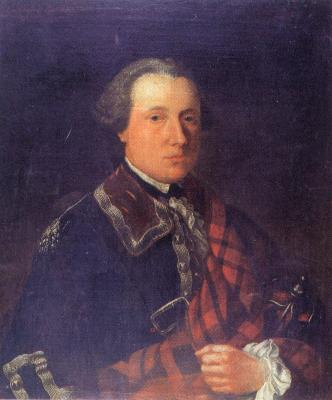
- 1762 painting suggested as based on 1748 sketch of Lochiel, now in Achnacarry House
- Tenure: c. 1719–1748
- Predecessor: John Cameron, 18th Lochiel
- Successor: John Cameron, 20th Lochiel
- Born: c. 1695; Achnacarry, Lochaber, Scotland
- Died: 26 October 1748 (aged 53); Bergues, France
- Wars and battles: 1745 Jacobite Rising; Prestonpans; Falkirk; Culloden
- Offices: Colonel, Cameron of Lochiel's Regiment 1745–1746; Colonel, Régiment d'Albanie 1747–1748; Order of Saint Michael
- Spouse: Anne Campbell
- Issue: John Cameron, 20th Lochiel (1732–1761); James Cameron (1736–1759); Charles Cameron, 21st Lochiel (1747–1776)
- Parents: John Cameron of Lochiel; Isobel Campbell

Donald Cameron of Lochiel (c. 1695 – 26 October 1748), popularly known as the Gentle Lochiel, was a Scottish Jacobite, soldier and hereditary chief of Clan Cameron, traditionally loyal to the exiled House of Stuart. His support for Charles Edward Stuart proved pivotal in the early stages of the 1745 Rising. Lochiel was among the Highlanders defeated at the Battle of Culloden, and thereafter went into hiding before eventually fleeing to France.

Born into a Non-juring Episcopalian and staunchly Jacobite family, his father was permanently exiled after the 1715 Rising and when his grandfather Sir Ewen Cameron of Lochiel died in 1719, Donald assumed his duties as Chief of Clan Cameron. The clan held a strategic importance out of proportion to numbers due to the compact nature of their lands and ability to act as a cohesive unit; in contrast, many of their rivals were scattered across different areas and riven by internal feuds. Despite considerable misgivings in launching the rebellion, Lochiel played an important role in the course of the rising, being among the most prominent of the Highland chiefs and commanding a regiment which was widely regarded as being the most elite and reliable component of the Jacobite army.

Defeated and wounded at Culloden, Lochiel was forced into hiding in company with Prince Charles and other senior Jacobites. Upon escaping to France in late 1746, he was appointed Colonel of the Régiment d'Albanie, the Scottish Guards of the French Royal Army, and made a member of the Order of Saint Michael by Louis XV. He was to command his regiment during the War of the Austrian Succession, but died at Bergues, French Flanders on 23 October 1748.

== Early life ==
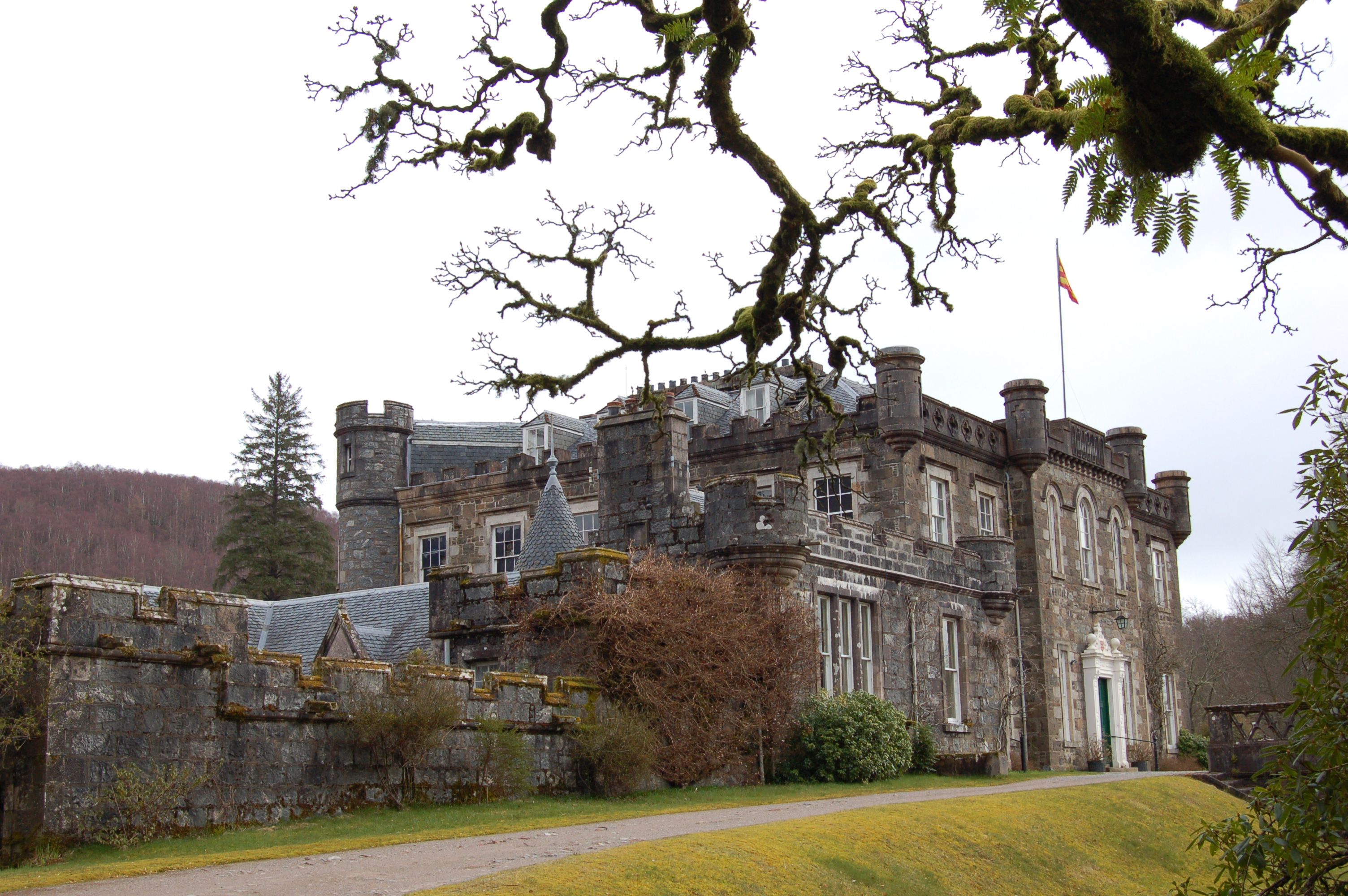
Achnacarry Castle

Arms of Cameron of Lochiel

Donald Cameron was born circa 1695, although some sources record 1700, (Note: 1695 is more accurate given that his brother John Cameron of Fassiefern's birth was recorded as 1698.) the eldest son of John Cameron of Lochiel (1663–1747), a committed Jacobite who participated in the 1708 attempt, the 1715 and 1719 Risings, and was made a Lord of Parliament in the Jacobite peerage. As a result, his father spent the rest of his life in exile and when his grandfather Sir Ewen Cameron died in 1719, Donald became acting clan chief and was thereafter known as Lochiel.

Lochiel's brothers included John Cameron, 1st of Fassiefern (1698–1785), Alexander Cameron (1701–1746) and Archibald Cameron (1707–1753). Alexander was a Jesuit priest, who was captured at the Battle of Culloden and died of disease and mistreatment awaiting trial; Archibald was the physician of Prince Charles and escaped with Lochiel in 1746, but was arrested when he returned to Scotland in 1753 and executed at Tyburn.

In 1729, Lochiel married Anne Campbell (1707–1761), who like his mother came from a Jacobite branch of the Campbell clan. Anne was the daughter of Sir James Campbell, 5th Baronet, a prominent Argyll laird and chieftain of the Campbells of Auchinbreck; her hand in marriage compelled Lochiel to install extensive gardens and extensions upon the property at Achnacarry. They had three sons and four daughters. He visited his exiled father in Paris and in his youth was undoubtedly instilled with Jacobitism by his father and others. In 1729, Lochiel became the main Jacobite agent in the Highlands for Prince James Francis Edward Stuart; who was termed "the Old Pretender" by Whig partisans, and "The King over the Water" by the Jacobites. Meanwhile, Murray of Broughton had the same role in the Lowlands.

== Career ==
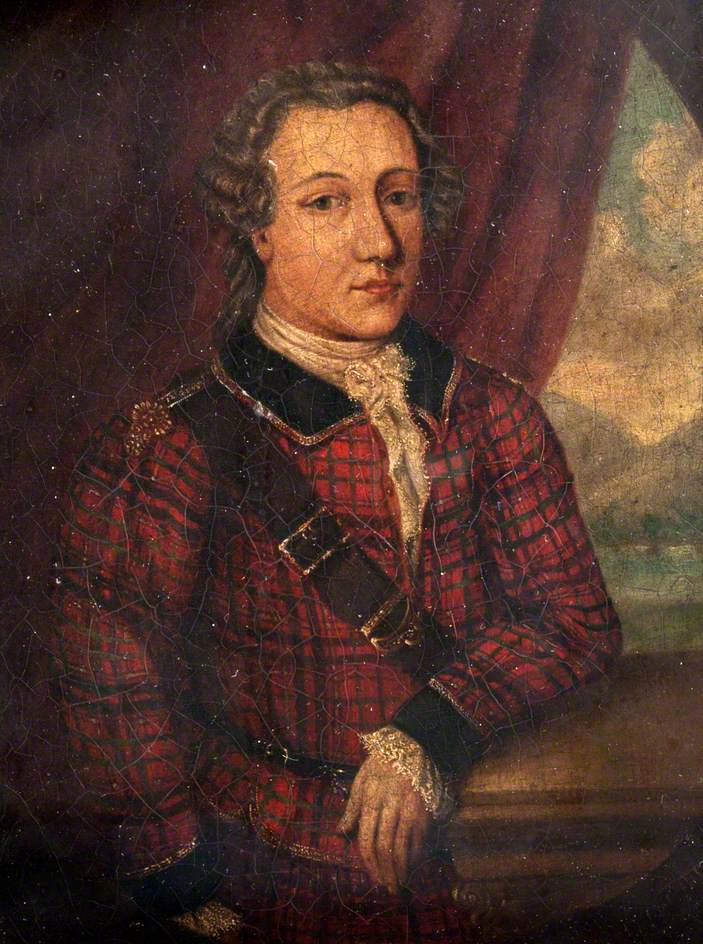
Portrait by George Chalmers, presently kept at the West Highland Museum

=== Pre-1745 ===
Lochiel and six other leading Jacobites, including his father-in-law Sir James Campbell, formed an association committing to a Stuart restoration, but only with French military backing.

=== The 1745 Rising ===
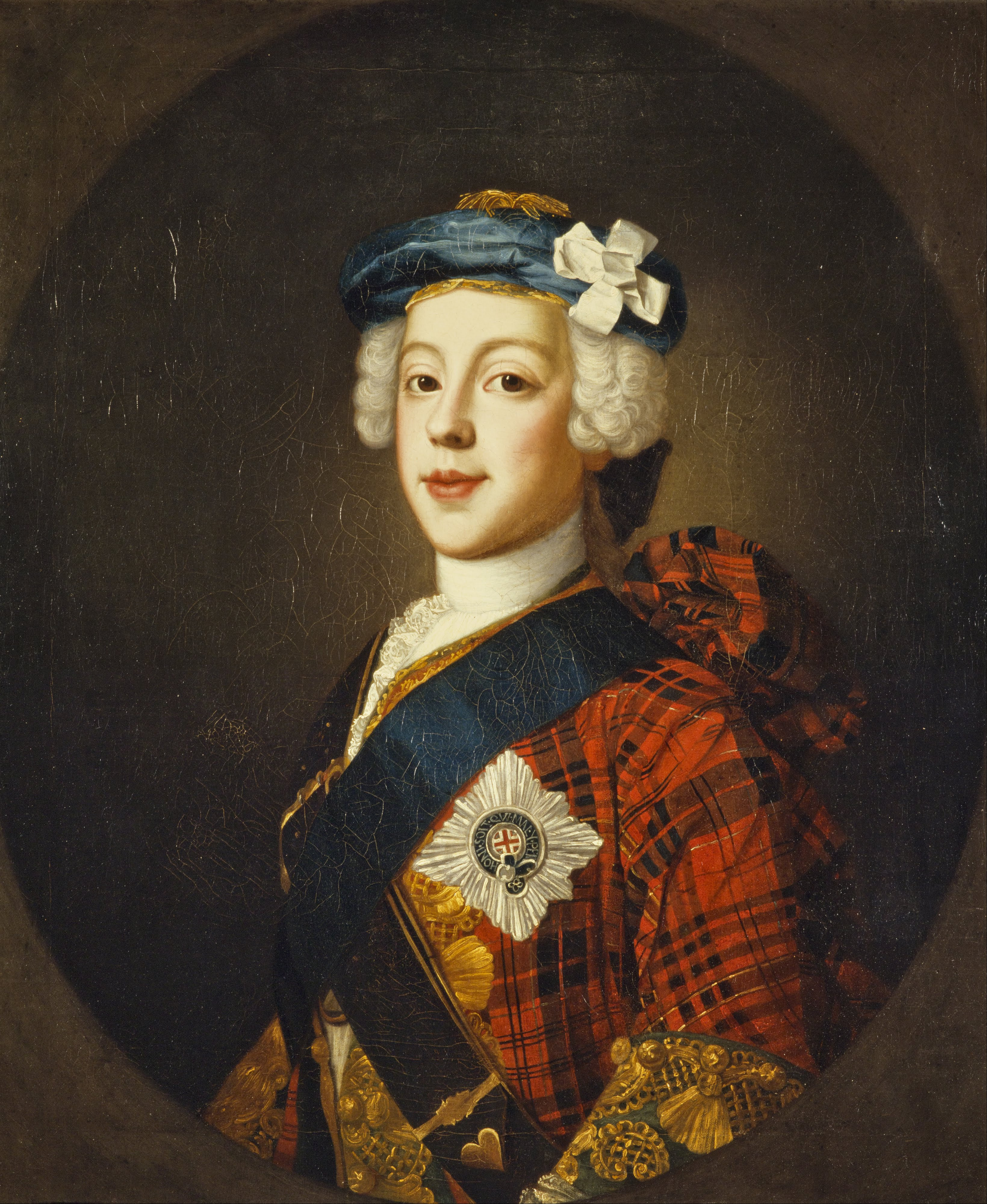
Prince Charles in Highland dress, painted ca 1737

After Murray shared this with the Jacobite Buck Club, Lochiel and others signed a declaration urging Charles not to do so, unless he brought 6,000 French troops, money and weapons. When Charles landed on Eriskay in July, Lochiel refused to meet him but was eventually persuaded, although his brother John Cameron of Fassefern warned emotion would prevail over his judgement. This proved correct and Lochiel's commitment persuaded others, including his cousin Ewen MacPherson of Cluny, who deserted from Loudon's Highlanders before Prestonpans. The process took over three weeks and Lochiel finally did so only when Charles gave him a personal guarantee for "the full value of his estate should the rising prove abortive," and Glengarry provided a written undertaking to raise the Macdonalds.

Lochiel's decision was not a surprise to John Cameron or Duncan Forbes, senior government legal officer in Scotland. This suggests it was largely emotional, although his own account claims he did so 'after fruitless attempts to persuade [Charles] to go back where he came from.' It is often claimed the government forced him into it by ordering his arrest but there is little evidence this was a factor; warrants for Lochiel, Glengarry, Clanranald and others were issued in late June, a month before Charles landed and not executed. The reluctance of the Jacobite chiefs to participate was well-known and preventive detention a commonly used means for providing sympathisers an excuse not to do so.

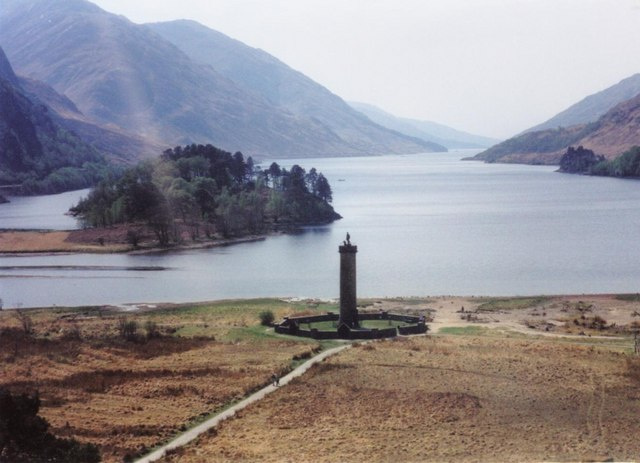
Promontory of Glenfinnan, whence the rebellion was launched on 19 August 1745

The ability of clan chiefs to quickly mobilise large numbers of men derived from 'regalian rights' giving them wide-ranging powers over their clansmen and Lochiel demanded that his clansmen take up arms. Those who would not were flogged or threatened with eviction, both of which were supervised by Dr. Archibald Cameron and which was allegedly a factor in his later betrayal by fellow Cameron clansmen when he returned to Scotland in March 1753.

The Rebellion was launched at Glenfinnan on 19 August; the initial Jacobite force consisted of 900 to 1,100 men, mostly Camerons and MacDonalds, including Lochiel's nephew, Donald MacDonald of Kinlochmoidart (1705–1746). While Lochiel had no military experience, he proved a competent regimental commander and the Camerons one of the more reliable Jacobite units. His initiative was credited for the bloodless capture of Edinburgh in September, while the Camerons also fought at Prestonpans, a battle lasting less than 15 minutes.

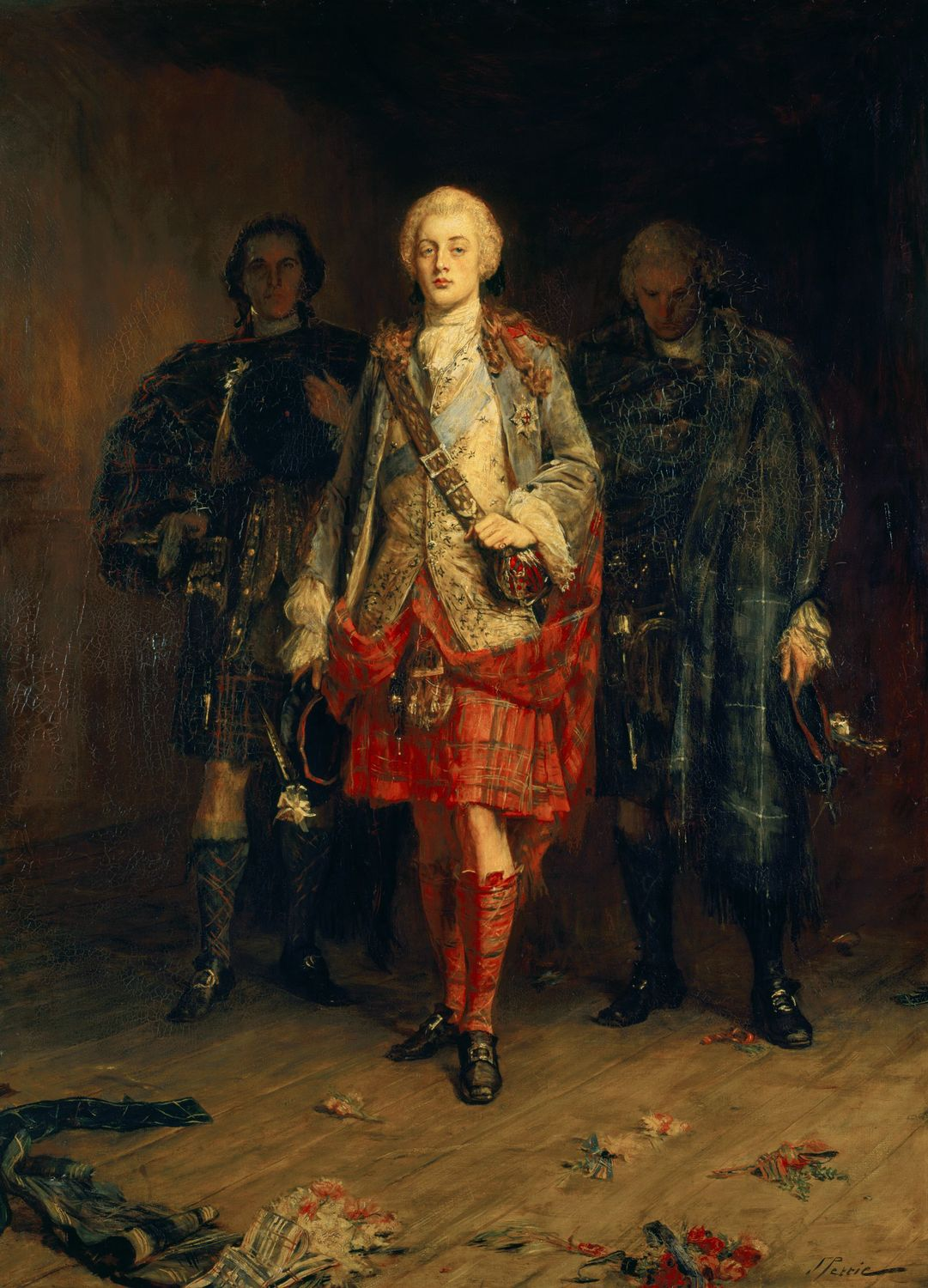
Bonnie Prince Charlie, flanked by Lochiel and Lord Pitsligo, enters the ballroom at Holyroodhouse, painted by John Pettie, c.1892

Lochiel's nickname 'Gentle' came from his insistence there be no reprisals against their opponents in Edinburgh, a sensible approach for anyone wishing to establish an independent Scotland. They had little interest in invading England and were unconvinced by Charles' personal qualities.

Strategy was determined by the War Council, dominated by the West Highland chiefs who provided the bulk of the Jacobite Army, including Lochiel, Keppoch, Young Clanranald, Glengarry and Stewart of Appin. They agreed to invade England on 31 October but only with great reluctance and only with the condition that Charles' claims to have received assurances of both English and French support were forthcoming. The failure of these to materialise led to a majority of the Council voting to retreat back to Scotland from Derby; but the real damage was the admission by Charles that he had been bluffing at Edinburgh. Lochiel remained silent out of deference to the Prince during the meeting but was among the overwhelming majority who approved the decision to retreat.

The army crossed back into Scotland, entering Hamilton on 23 December; an anonymous resident later described the Camerons, Macphersons and MacDonalds as 'an undisciplined, ungovernable army of Highland robbers, who took no notice of their commanders.' On 8 January, the Jacobites besieged Stirling and defeated an attempt by Henry Hawley to relieve the garrison at Falkirk on 17 January. Despite this, on 1 February they abandoned Stirling and retreated north to Inverness, while Lochiel took his regiment to invest Fort William, still held by government troops, at the southern end of the Great Glen. They abandoned the siege to rejoin the main army in time for the Battle of Culloden on 16 April; the Camerons suffered heavy losses attacking the government left, while Lochiel was severely wounded and carried off the field.

The defeat of the Jacobite Army ended the rising; Lochiel later alleged that the Duke of Cumberland offered him and his clansmen terms if they handed in their weapons and surrendered, but, knowing the Duke's duplicity, he rejected them. In late May, he, Lord George Murray, Murray of Broughton, John Roy Stewart and others met near Loch Morar to discuss options but there was little enthusiasm for continuing the fight. Lochiel, Archibald Cameron and Prince Charles were sheltered by Ewan MacPherson of Cluny until they were picked up by a French ship in September.

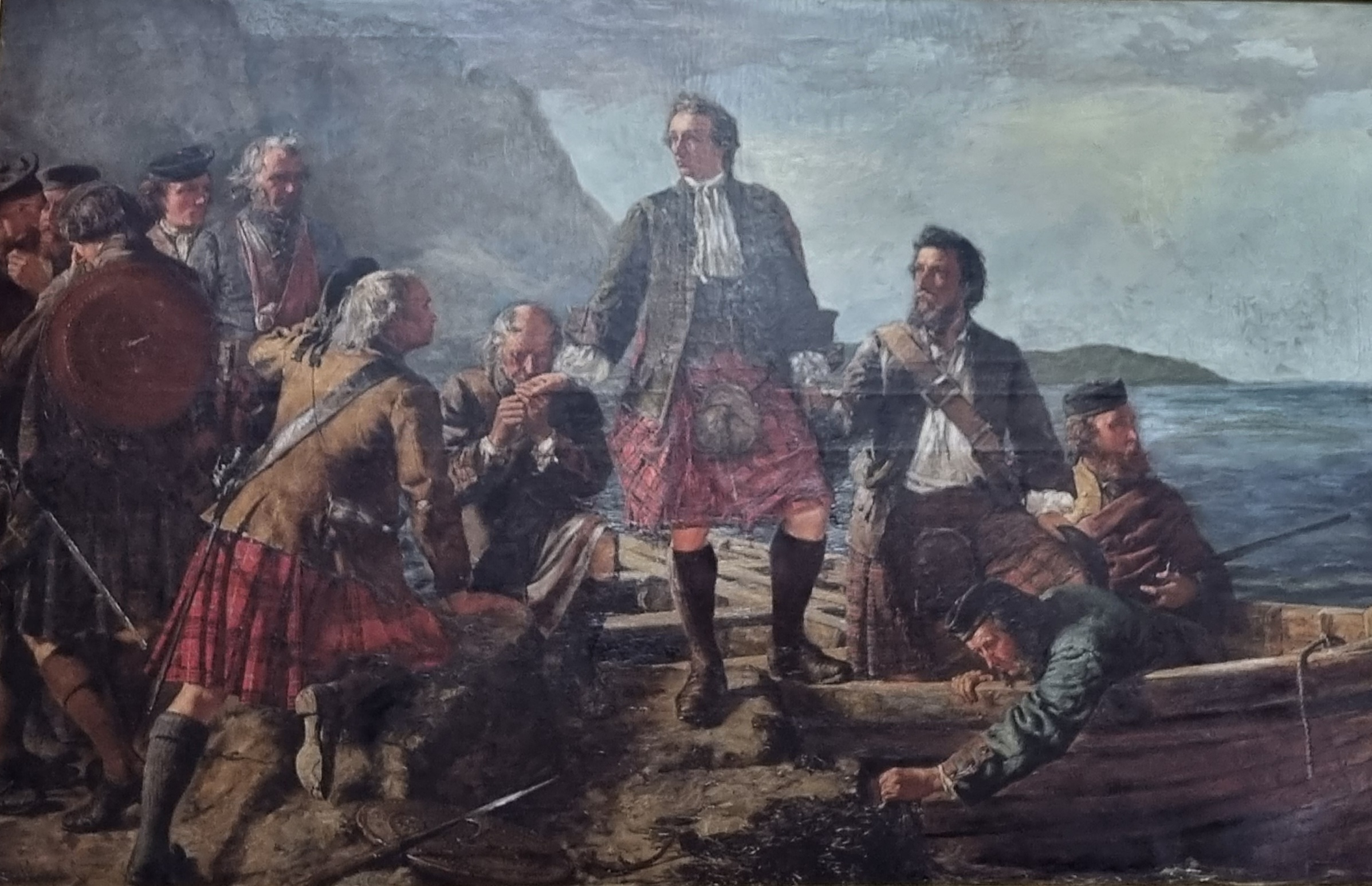
Lochaber No More – 'Bonnie Prince Charlie and Lochiel leaving Scotland', painting by John Blake MacDonald, 1863

== Later life ==
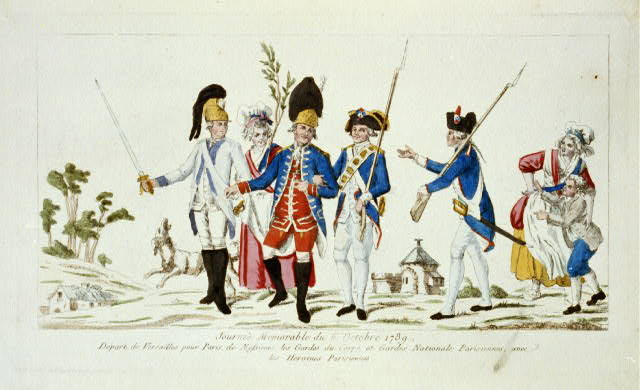
Garde Ecossaise (Scottish Guards)

=== Exile in France ===
Prior to 1743, few viewed the Stuarts as a useful tool and even those who did saw little value in restoring them to the British throne. (Note: Summarised in a British intelligence report of 1755; "...'tis not in the interest of France the House of Stuart shoud ever be restored, as it would only unite the three Kingdoms against Them; England would have no exterior [threat] to mind, and [...] prevent any of its Descendants (the Stuarts) attempting anything against the Libertys or Religion of the People.") By 1747, they had become an obstacle to peace negotiations and the French ignored appeals from Charles and Lochiel for another attempt. The unofficial French envoy in Scotland, d’Éguilles, described Lochiel as "virtuous, intelligent and influential" but was so critical of Charles he recommended France consider establishing a Scots Republic instead.

Lochiel was appointed colonel of the Régiment d'Albanie and commander of the Garde Écossaise by Louis XV; he was made a member of the Order of Saint Michael, and was also knighted by Charles. He succeeded his father, who died in Boulogne circa 1747, as Lord Lochiel in the Jacobite peerage (French: Seigneur de Lochiel), but being a title in the Jacobite peerage it was only recognised in continental Europe. Lochiel and his family took up residence at Fontainebleau, where he wrote Memoires d'un Ecossais, an account of his life, and the 1745 campaign from his own perspective, which was presented to King Louis. He never returned to Scotland.

=== Death ===
Lochiel died of a stroke on 26 October 1748 at Bergues. He was buried with the burial rites of the Scottish Episcopal Church in the Communal Cemetery of Bergues, where a monument commemorating him was later erected. He was succeeded as Chief by his son John Cameron, 20th of Lochiel, who was allowed home in 1759 but died in 1762; the Clan Cameron estates were ultimately restored in 1784 to Lochiel's grandson, Donald Cameron, 22nd of Lochiel, who remains notorious for both his financial extravagance and, even more so, for evicting his clansmen en masse during the Highland Clearances.

== Legacy ==
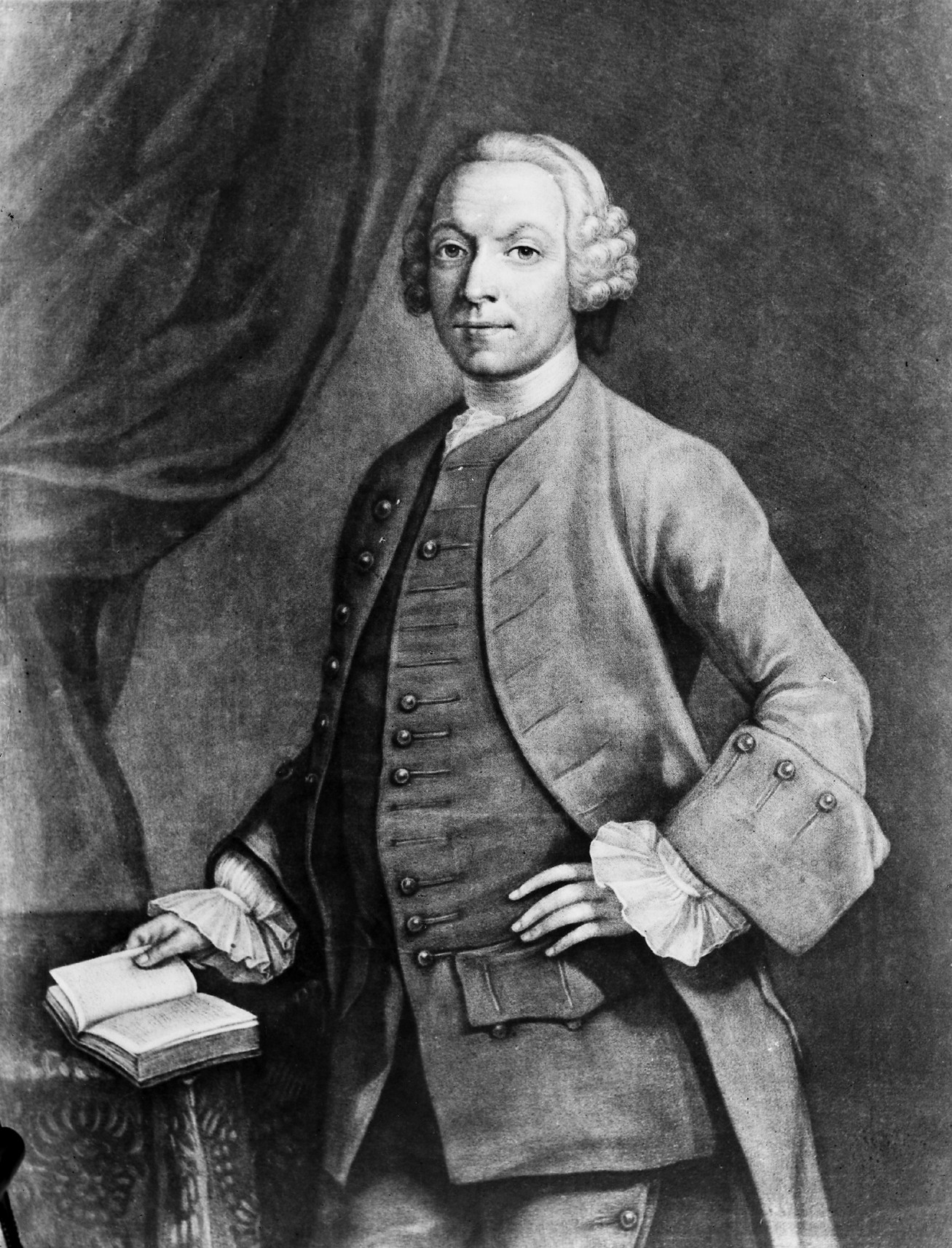
Archibald Cameron, Lochiel's brother, famously executed in June 1753

=== Eulogies ===
The December 1748 issue of the Scots Magazine lamented Lochiel's death in exile and recorded that "Good Lochiel was now a Whig in heaven". However, such an unctuous remark may be confidently dismissed as Lochiel was undoubtedly a Jacobite to the end – and in legacy. Numerous eulogies praising Lochiel were published in the years following his death; 19th-century literature is equally well disposed towards him, by the likes of Sir Walter Scott, Home, Campbell and Smibert, placing him a "Highland hero ... firmly in the Scottish pantheon".

=== 'Gentle Lochiel' ===
The nickname Gentle Lochiel has become commonly associated with Donald Cameron, 19th Lochiel, but originated after his death. The first use of the expression is recorded in Robert Chambers' popular History of the Rebellion in 1745 and 1746, which was first published between 1827 and 1828. Lochiel was considered by public perception of the 19th century as 'the most amicable and accomplished of the highland heroes ... whose humanity matched his courage and loyalty.' To this day, it is a tradition that whenever the present Clan Cameron Chief enters on an official visit to Glasgow, the bells of the Tolbooth are rung to commemorate his forebear, and specifically his action in preventing the city being sacked by Prince Charles's troops in 1746.

This everlasting public perception of Lochiel is curious given that he was instrumental in setting the rising into action by backing Charles at Glenfinnan in August 1745. Indeed, while acknowledged as a man of honour and principle, his tenure proved disastrous for his clan and relatives. The Camerons suffered heavy losses at Culloden, his nephew Donald was killed, his brother, Father Alexander Cameron, died after having been tortured while incarcerated in a prison hulk anchored in the River Thames in 1746. When Archibald Cameron of Lochiel returned in 1753 as part of the Elibank Plot, and to retrieve the 'Loch Arkaig treasure', he was allegedly betrayed by fellow members of Clan Cameron who were 'sickened by his Jacobitism', and later executed. Lochiel's biographer John Gibson quotes a local proverb about the unusually fair-haired Lochiel; "it will be a sad day for Lochaber when there is next a fair-haired Lochiel".

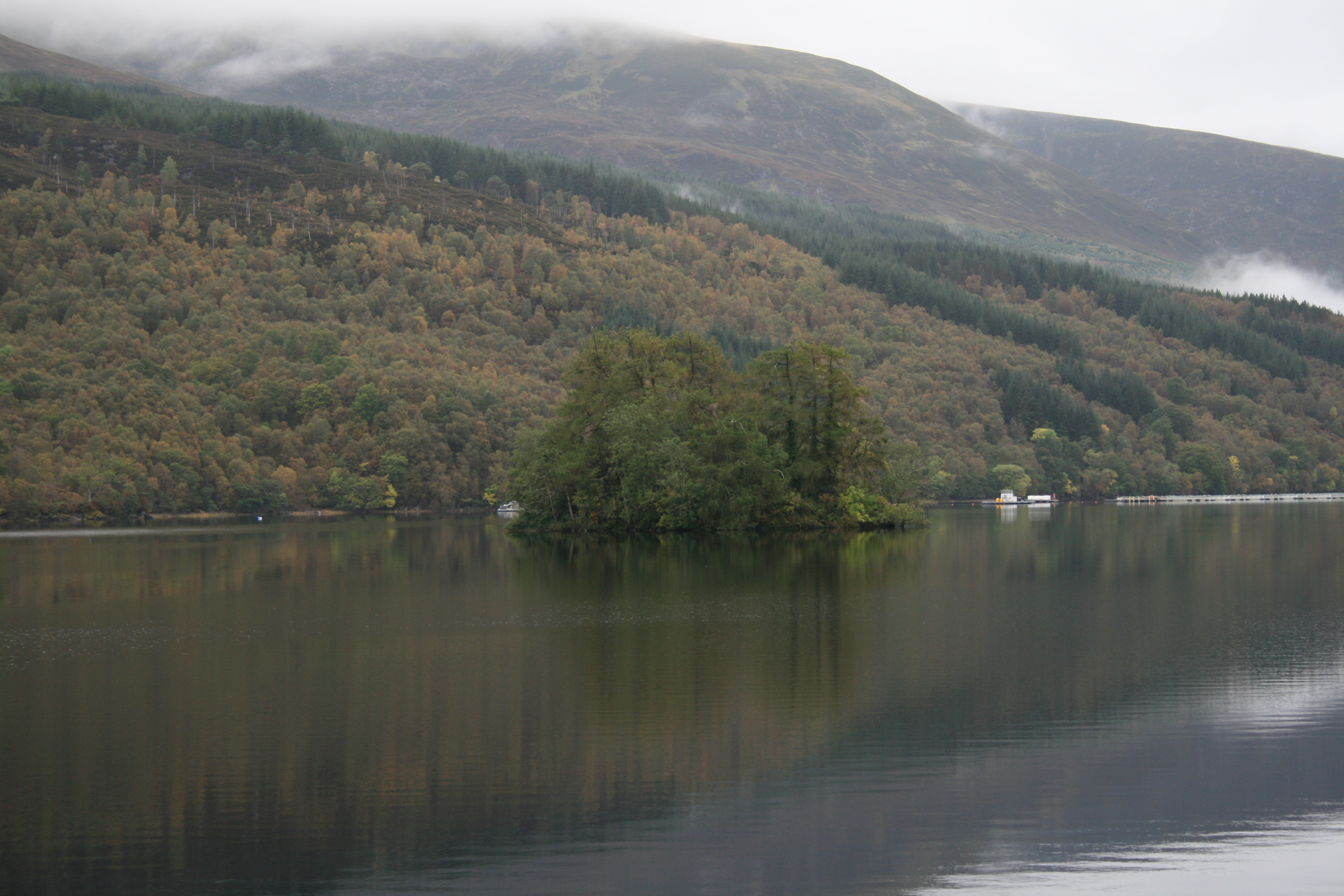
Eilean Loch Airceig was the traditional resting place of the Chiefs of Clan Cameron

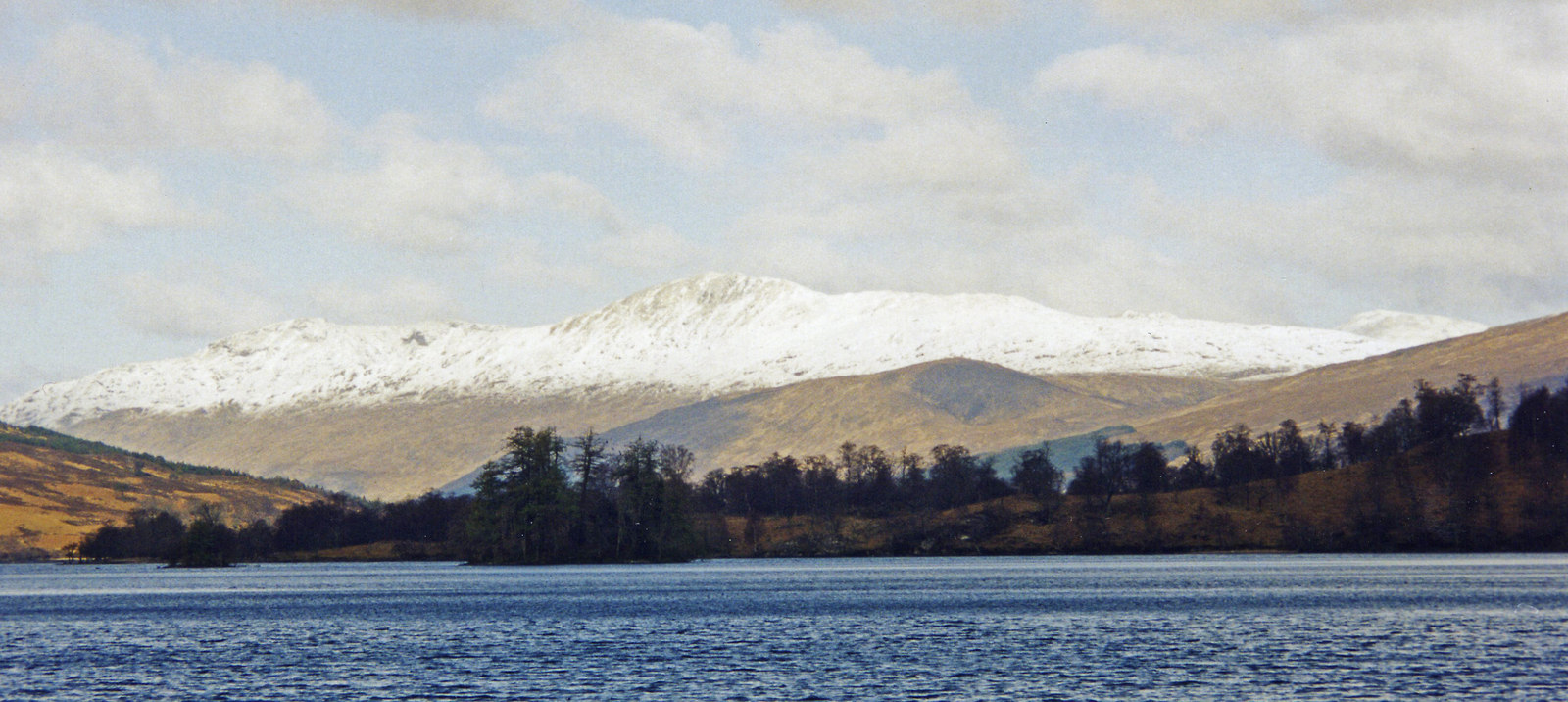
Loch Arkaig, Lochaber

== Family ==
Lochiel had married Anne Campbell (1707–c.1748), daughter of Sir James Campbell, 5th Baronet and Janet MacLeod, daughter of Iain Breac MacLeod, 18th Chief of Clan MacLeod (1637–1693). They had three sons and four daughters, as follows:

- John Cameron, 20th Lochiel (1732–1762), succeeded as Chief in 1748, aged 16; died without issue
- Capt. James Cameron (1736–1759), officer of the French service; died without issue
- Isobel Cameron (1738–?), married Chevalier Morres of the French service
- Janet Cameron (1738–?), died unmarried at the Carmelite convent in Paris
- Henrietta Cameron (1742–?), married Captain Portin of the French service
- Donalda Cameron (1744–?), died unmarried
- Charles Cameron, 21st Lochiel (1747–1776), succeeded as Chief in 1762

== In popular culture ==
- D. K. Broster's novel The Flight of the Heron (1925) features Lochiel as a main character and cousin of the fictional protagonist Ewen Cameron of Ardroy. It was also adapted into a six-part television series.
- Mary Maxwell Campbell's March of the Cameron Men (1908) alludes to Lochiel's march to Glenfinnan. It was famously adopted as pipe music by the Queen's Own Cameron Highlanders.
- Thomas Campbell's Lochiel's Warning (1814), a narrative-poem in which Lochiel is warned about the uprising by a seer; it is famous for its line 'Coming events cast their shadow before.'
- Sir Walter Scott's Tales of a Grandfather commemorates Lochiel on the subject of the '45

== Sources ==
- Blaikie, Walter Biggar (1916). Origins of the 'Forty-Five, and Other Papers Relating to That Rising. T. and A. Constable at the Edinburgh University Press for the Scottish History Society. OCLC 2974999.
- Black, Jeremy (1998). Britain As A Military Power, 1688–1815 (2016 ed.). Routledge. ISBN 978-1138987913.
- Gibson, John Sibbald (2004). "Cameron, Donald, of Lochiel". Oxford Dictionary of National Biography (Online ed.). Oxford University Press. doi:10.1093/ref:odnb/4438. (Subscription, Wikipedia Library access or UK public library membership required.)
- Gibson, John Sibbald (1994). Lochiel of the '45: the Jacobite Chief and the Prince. Edinburgh University Press. ISBN 978-0748605071.
- Harding, Richard (2013). The Emergence of Britain's Global Naval Supremacy: The War of 1739–1748. Boydell Press. ISBN 978-1843838234.
- Herman, Arthur (2003). The Scottish Enlightenment: The Scots' Invention of the Modern World. Fourth Estate. ISBN 978-1841152769.
- Hunter, James (2000). Last of the Free: A Millennial History of the Highlands and Islands of Scotland. Mainstream Publishing. ISBN 978-1840183764.
- Kybett, Susan Maclean (1988). Bonnie Prince Charlie: A Biography. London: Unwin Hyman. ISBN 0044402139.
- Lenman, Bruce (1980). The Jacobite Risings in Britain 1689–1746. Methuen Publishing. ISBN 978-0413396501.
- McCann, Jean E. (1963). The Organisation of the Jacobite Army (PhD thesis). Edinburgh University. hdl:1842/9381. OCLC 646764870.
- Mackillop, Andrew (1995). Military Recruiting in the Scottish Highlands 1739–1815: The Political, Social and Economic Context (PhD thesis). University of Glasgow. OCLC 59608677.
- Lord Elcho, David Wemyss (1907). A Short account of the affairs of Scotland in the years 1744, 1745, 1746. Edinburgh: David Douglas. OCLC 1033725714.
- McLynn, Frank (1980). "An Eighteenth-Century Scots Republic? An Unlikely Project from Absolutist France". The Scottish Historical Review. 59 (168): 177–182.
- Murray, John (1898). Bell, Robert Fitzroy (ed.). Memorials of John Murray of Broughton: Sometime Secretary to Prince Charles Edward, 1740–1747. T. and A. Constable at the Edinburgh University Press for the Scottish History Society. OCLC 879747289.
- Pittock, Murray (2004). "Charles Edward Stuart; styled Charles; known as the Young Pretender, Bonnie Prince Charlie". Oxford Dictionary of National Biography (online ed.). Oxford University Press. doi:10.1093/ref:odnb/5145. (Subscription, Wikipedia Library access or UK public library membership required.)
- Wynne, Thomas (1994). "The Conversion of Alexander Cameron". The Innes Review. 45 (2): 178–187. doi:10.3366/inr.1994.45.2.178.
- Riding, Jacqueline (2016). Jacobites: A New History of the 45 Rebellion. Bloomsbury. ISBN 978-1408819128.
- Stewart of Ardvorlich, John (1974). The Camerons: A History of Clan Cameron. Clan Cameron Association.
- Stewart, James A. Jr. (2001). "Highland Motives in the Jacobite Rising of 1745–46: 'Forcing Out,' Traditional Documentation and Gaelic Poetry". Proceedings of the Harvard Celtic Colloquium. 20/21: 141–173. ISBN 978-0674023833. JSTOR 41219594.
- Tomasson, Katherine; Buist, Francis (1978). Battles of the Forty-Five. HarperCollins Distribution Services. ISBN 978-0713407693.
- Zimmerman, Doron (2003). The Jacobite Movement in Scotland and in Exile, 1746-1759. Palgrave Macmillan. ISBN 978-1403912916.
