= John Cameron of Lochiel =

- 18th Lochiel
- Coat of arms
- Tenure: 1689–1719
- Predecessor: Sir Ewen Cameron, 17th Lochiel
- Successor: Donald Cameron, 19th Lochiel
- Born: c. 1663; Achnacarry, Lochaber, Scotland
- Died: c. 1747 (aged 83); Nieuport, French Flanders
- Spouse: Isobel Campbell
- Issue: Donald Cameron of Lochiel; John Cameron, 1st of Fassiefern; Fr. Alexander Cameron; Dr. Archibald Cameron

John Cameron of Lochiel (1663–1747) was a Scottish Jacobite and the 18th Lochiel of Clan Cameron. He was the father of several prominent Jacobite figures, including Donald Cameron of Lochiel, otherwise known as the Gentle Lochiel, who played an important role in the 1745 Jacobite Rising.

== Biography ==
John Cameron was the eldest son of Sir Ewen Cameron of Lochiel and his second wife, Isobel Maclean, daughter of Sir Lachlan Maclean, 1st Baronet. His famed father had been one of the first to join Glencairn's rising for King Charles II, by whose favour he was knighted in 1681. He fought with his father at the Battle of Killiecrankie in 1689.

As acting chief of the clan, Cameron joined the Earl of Mar's forces in the 1715 Rising. At the Battle of Sheriffmuir, he displayed inept military leadership which saw the Camerons routed. He was attainted and forced into exile in France, but nonetheless, on 27 January 1717, was made a Lord of Parliament in Jacobite peerage by the Old Pretender "James III and VIII".

During the 1719 Rising, Cameron fought at Glenshiel and following that defeat returned to exile permanently. Old Lochiel, as he came to be known, was granted a generous pension by King James. He lived lavishly in Paris, but later occupied cheaper residence in Boulogne alongside his cousin Sir Hector Maclean, also chief-in-exile of Clan Maclean. Old Lochiel died at Nieuport, French Flanders in 1747. Whether or not he took part in the 1745 Rising is uncertain; unlikely given that he would have been about 80 years old at the time.

Cameron had married Isobel Campbell, daughter of Sir Alexander Campbell, 6th of Lochnell and Margaret Stewart. His eldest son and successor was Donald Cameron of Lochiel (1695–1748), who played an important role in the Jacobite rising of 1745. His other sons were John Cameron, 1st of Fassiefern (1698–1785), Alexander Cameron (1701–1746), a Jacobite courtier and Catholic convert, and Archibald Cameron (1707–1753), Prince Charles's personal physician who was the last Jacobite to be executed for treason in 1753.
