= William Skeoch Cumming =

Scottish watercolorist (1864–1929)

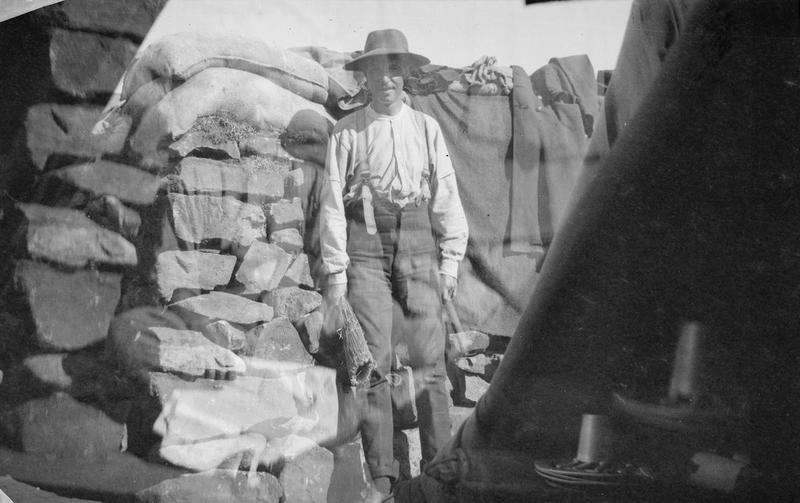
Cumming during the Second Boer War

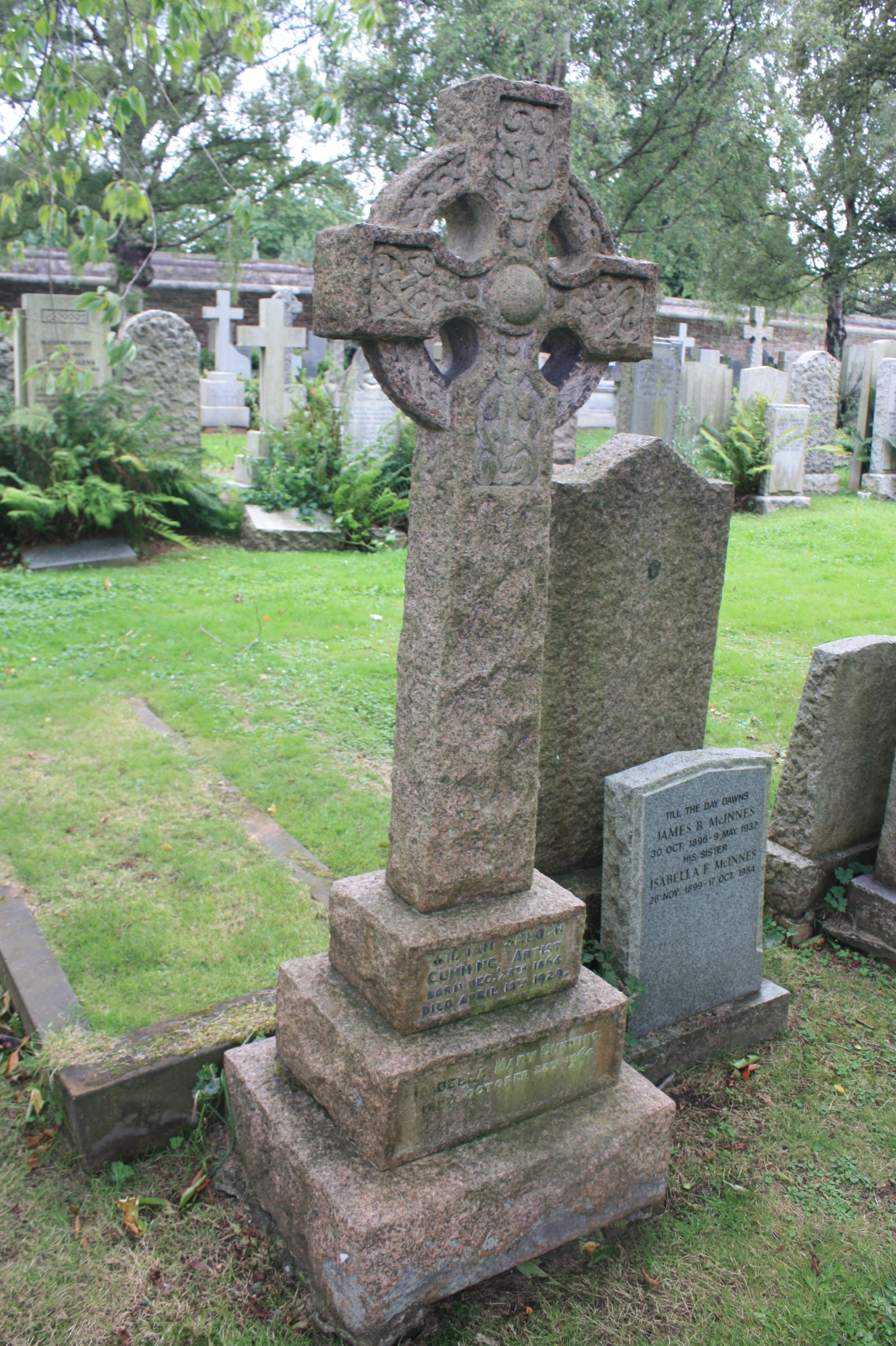
Grave of William Skeoch Cumming, Dean Cemetery

William Skeoch Cumming (28 December 1864 Edinburgh – 10 April 1929 Edinburgh), was a Scottish watercolourist, mainly of portraits, military subjects and Scottish Military History. Between 1912 and his death, he turned his hand to the designing and production of four large tapestries.

== Life ==
He was the fourth son of John Cumming (1824–1908), also an artist, and Jane Skeoch, who was a cousin of Horatio McCulloch. William enjoyed sketching exercises with his father before studies at the Edinburgh School of Art and the Royal Scottish Academy School, and began his art career at the Theatre Royal as a scene painter. His sketches on Scottish life appeared in the Black & White magazine of 1896.

He served with the 19th Company Imperial Yeomanry (previously the East Lothian and Berwickshire Imperial Yeomanry) in the Boer War, commanded by Sir James Percy Miller (1864–1906), whose equestrian portrait he painted. On 23 February 1900 his company and two others boarded the SS Carthaginian layng at anchor on the River Clyde, and arrived at Cape Town on 19 March 1900. From here they were sent to various camps before being dispatched to the front. His watercolour sketches recorded incidents during the campaign and his portraits depicted characters involved in the war. More than 300 of his photographs are to be found at the Imperial War Museum.

Cumming returned from South Africa having suffered no more than a bout of dysentery. Once home he joined the Scottish Horse

From all accounts Cumming was a cheerful person, enjoying his freedom and his music. He lodged with his elder sister and her family and only married Belle Sutton, another watercolourist, shortly before his death. His studio was at 28 Queen Street before he moved to 31 Buckingham Terrace.

He is buried in the 20th century extension to Dean Cemetery near its centre.
