= Chiefs of Clan Cameron =

Scottish clan chiefs

Coat of arms of the Lochiel, Chief of Clan Cameron, encircled with the ornament of a Knight of the Thistle

The following is a list of the Chiefs of Clan Cameron, the senior line of the ancient Cameron clan. The chief is seated at Achnacarry Castle and uniquely referred to as the Lochiel (Scottish Gaelic: Loch Iall).

== Traditional chiefs ==
The first ten chiefs of Clan Cameron cannot be authenticated by contemporary evidence and so are only traditional history.

No.	Name	Died	Details
VII	Sir John Cameron		Said to have led the clan at the Battle of Bannockburn in 1314.
VIII	John Ochtery Cameron		Said to have led the clan at the Battle of Halidon Hill in 1333.
IX	Allan MacOchtery Cameron		Son of VIII.
X	Ewen MacAllan Cameron		Son of IX; died without issue.

== Authenticated chiefs ==
Donald Dubh Cameron, traditionally XI chief of Clan Cameron (c. 1400–1460), is the first chief of Clan Cameron whose existence can be authenticated by contemporary evidence.

No.	Name	Died	Details
XI	Donald Dubh Cameron	1460	Son of IX. Fought at the Battle of Harlaw in 1411. All subsequent chiefs were known as Mac Dhomhnaill Dubh.
XII	Allan MacIldny Cameron	1480	Son of XI. Killed in battle in 1480 fighting the Mackintoshes.
XIII	Ewen Mor Cameron of Lochiel	1546	Son of XII. Famed for interactions with the witch Gormla of Moy, he was executed for treason in 1546.
XIV	Ewen Beag Cameron of Lochiel	1554	Grandson of XIII. Descendants of Beag's illegitimate son Dubh Taillear became the Taylor sept.
XV	Donald Dubh MacDonald Cameron of Lochiel	1565	Younger brother of XIV. Fought at the Battle of Corrichie in 1562 in support of Mary, Queen of Scots.
XVI	Allan Cameron of Lochiel	1647	Son of XV's younger brother.
XVII	Sir Ewen Cameron of Lochiel	1719	Grandson of XVI. Most famous chief in clan history, known as Ewen Dubh, said to have killed the last wolf in Scotland and led the Jacobites at the Battle of Killiecrankie in 1689.
XVIII	John Cameron, Lord Lochiel	1747	Son of XVII. Created Lord Lochiel in Jacobite peerage, died in exile in France.
XIX	Donald Cameron of Lochiel	1748	Son of XVIII. Known as the Gentle Lochiel, led the clan at the Battle of Culloden and escaped to France with Bonnie Prince Charlie. His brother Dr Archie Cameron was hanged, drawn and beheaded in 1753, the last Jacobite to be executed.
XX	John Cameron, 20th Lochiel	1762	Son of XIX.
XXI	Charles Cameron, 21st Lochiel	1776	Younger son of XIX.
XXII	Donald Cameron, 22nd Lochiel	1832	Son of XXI. In 1784 Cameron estates were restored; married Hon. Anne Abercromby, daughter of Sir Ralph Abercromby.
XXIII	Donald Cameron, 23rd Lochiel	1858	Son of XXII. Fought with distinction at the Battle of Waterloo; married Lady Vere Hobart, sister of the Earl of Buckinghamshire and a scion of the Camerons of Glendessary.
XXIV	Donald Cameron, 24th Lochiel	1905	Son of XXIII. Diplomat, MP and groom-in-waiting to Queen Victoria; married Lady Margaret Scott, daughter of Duke of Buccleuch.
XXV	Sir Donald Walter Cameron KT, 25th Lochiel	1951	Son of XXIV. Colonel of Queen's Own Cameron Highlanders, fought in the Second Boer War and World War I; married Lady Hermione Graham, daughter of Duke of Montrose.
XXVI	Sir Donald Hamish Cameron KT, 26th Lochiel	2004	Son of XXV. Fought in the Italian campaign of World War II with Lovat Scouts; married Margot Gathorne-Hardy, niece of the Earl of Cranbrook.
XXVII	Donald Angus Cameron, 27th Lochiel	2023	Son of XXVI. Former Lord Lieutenant of Inverness. Married Lady Cecil Kerr, daughter of the Marquess of Lothian, in 1974.
XXVIII	Donald Andrew John Cameron, Baron Cameron of Lochiel, 28th Lochiel		Son of XXVII. The current chief of Clan Cameron. A Scottish Conservative Party politician, who was a Member of the Scottish Parliament (MSP) for the Highlands and Islands region between 2016 and 2024, before being appointed to the House of Lords. Married to Sarah MacIay, niece of Lord MacIay.
