= Scottish war memorials =

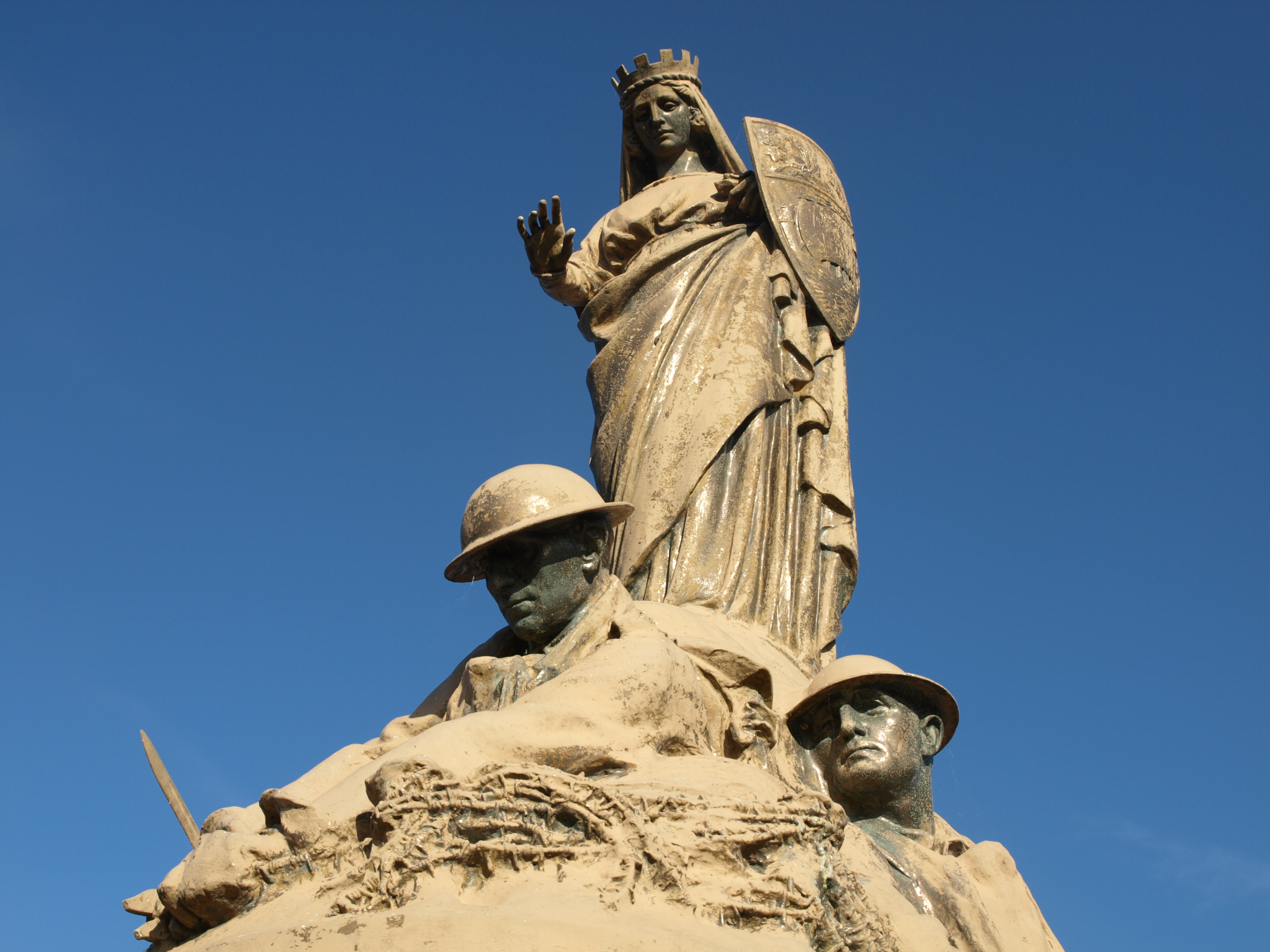
Alloa War Memorial in Clackmannanshire

Scottish war memorials are found in all communities in Scotland. They are found on most main streets and in many churches in Scotland. Many commemorate the sacrifice of the First World War, but there are others to wars before and since the First World War.

== History of Scottish war memorials ==
The history of Scotland has often been bloody, and the nation has historically embodied a strong martial tradition. Scots have fought in many battles and served in armed forces in many parts of the world. This service has been as part of Scots armies, as mercenaries, and in the British Armed Forces. The service of the martial Scots is commemorated with war memorials across Scotland and around the world.

Scottish war memorials commemorate the sacrifices made by Scottish combatants as early as 1263 through the more recent war in Iraq and conflict in Afghanistan. The earliest memorials recorded the battles fought against Viking and English invaders, and subsequent ones commemorated Scottish civil wars stemmming from religious intolerance or the succession of royalty. Most of these early memorials were not erected until the 19th century, sometimes hundreds of years after the actual battles had taken place, and generally did not list the individual names of those lost in these wars.

By the late 19th century after several small colonial wars, the infantry and cavalry regiments of Scotland began erecting memorials in churches and garrison towns in Scotland. These memorials began listing the names of those killed in combat, sometimes featuring only officers, but occasionally naming non-commissioned officers and other enlisted men.

The first recorded civic war memorial in Scotland naming local men who died overseas in combat is located in the churchyard at Balmaclellan, and was erected after the Crimean War. It was not until fifty years later after the Second Boer War that other such civic war memorials were erected in Scotland.

By 1914, a precedent had been set for local communities to erect war memorials when they had lost their sons in combat. By the time the First World War culminated in 1918, nearly every community in Scotland had erected a memorial to their own war dead. Around the same time, a proposal for a national war memorial led to the creation of the shrine at Edinburgh Castle, the Scottish National War Memorial. This memorial continues to memorialize Scots who have died in wars since 1914, and currently commemorates 206,779 men and women who have died serving in UK and Commonwealth Forces.

At the same time as the civic and national memorials were being erected, factories, banks, golf clubs, boys' clubs, schools, universities, churches, railways, police, post offices, and even a prison erected war memorials to those men and women who had gone to war.

Because of the size of military formations during the First World War, there were not only regimental memorials erected but brigade and divisional memorials as well.

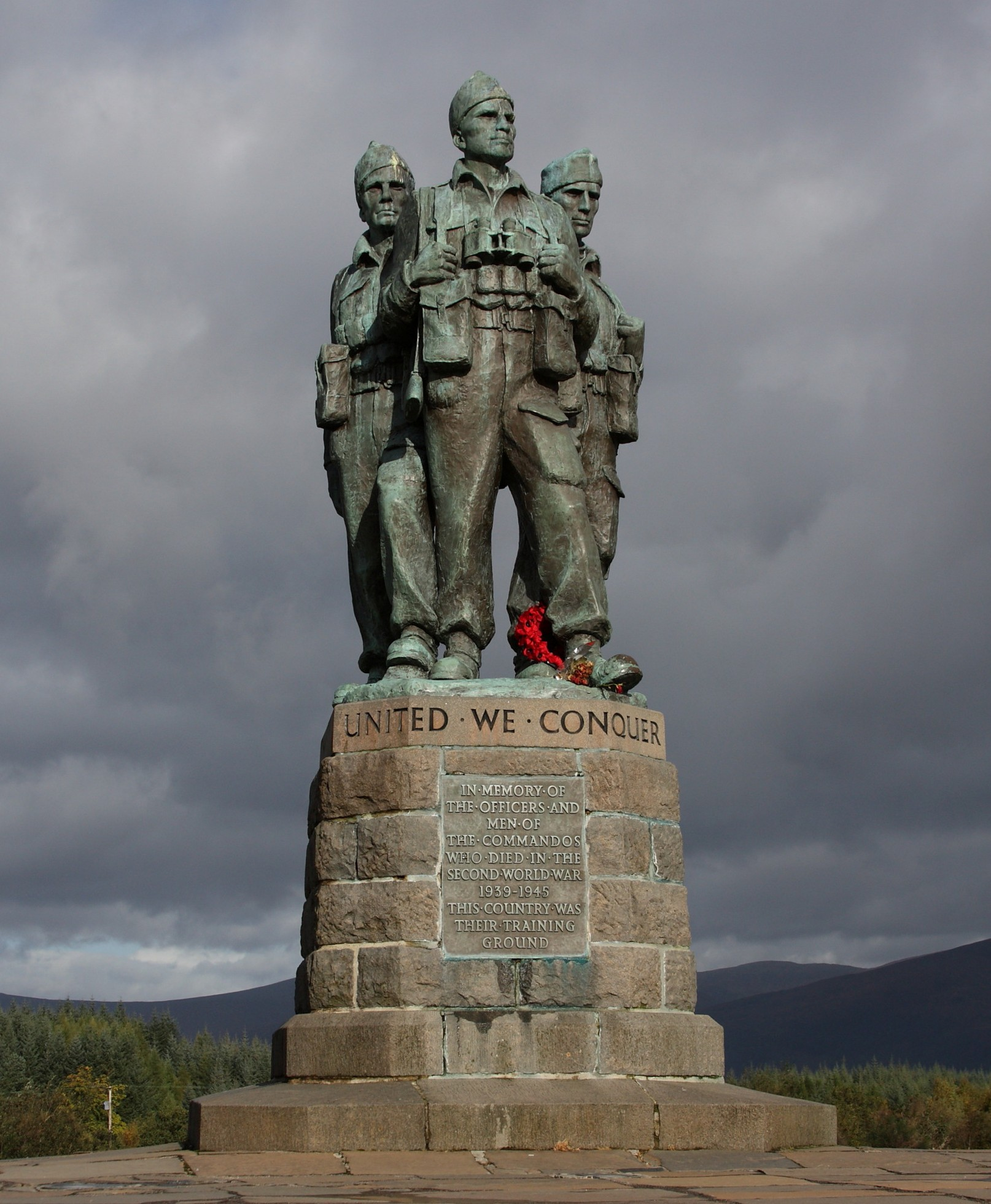
Commando Memorial in the Scottish Highlands was unveiled in 1952, dedicated to the World War II British Commandos that trained at Achnacarry Castle.

After the Second World War, many communities had the task of adding names to their existing war memorials. The village of Aberlady in East Lothian used the memorial they originally erected for the Boer War and reused for the First World War to list their Second World War dead. Other communities chose to erect new memorials for those lost during the Second World War instead of updating or adding to existing memorials.

Even today, communities are still erecting war memorials to men and women who died in the First and Second World Wars. Recent unveilings of Scottish war memorials include:

- The civic war memorials at Waterloo and Cowie.
- The Air Forces Memorial at Grangemouth.
- The Black Watch memorial at Balhousie Castle.
- "Buckhaven’s Secret" in Fife.
- 'Bamse' Memorial to the Norwegian Navy dog at Montrose.
- WW1 Nurses' Memorial at Central Library, Edinburgh, unveiled on 11 November 2015.
- French merchant ship SS Longwy crew memorial in Doune Cemetery, Girvan, commemorating the crew lost in a 1917 torpedoing, unveiled on 12 October 2024.

== Types of Scottish war memorials ==
There is no typical Scottish war memorial. Five of the most common types are: Celtic crosses, obelisks, cairns, mercat crosses, and statues. They may also take the form of plaques or tablets of bronze, brass, marble, granite or wood, as well as memorial gardens, fountains, rolls of honour, Crosses of Sacrifice, clock towers, lychgates, parks, halls, hospitals, bandstands, stained glass windows, altars, baptismal fonts, sporting cups, and medals.

Scottish artists and architects such as Sir Robert Lorimer, Alexander Carrick, Charles Pilkington Jackson, Thomas John Clapperton, and William Birnie Rhind have created some of these memorials.

After the First World War, there was a difference of opinion in some communities as to whether a memorial to a community's sacrifice should be a practical memorial which would benefit the living or a stone memorial to the dead. This led to some memorials being District Nurses, hospital beds, and holiday cottages for war widows and orphans. The formation of the National Health Service has resulted in the care of these memorials being taken out of local control, and many of these memorials subsequently no longer exist.

== Care for memorials ==
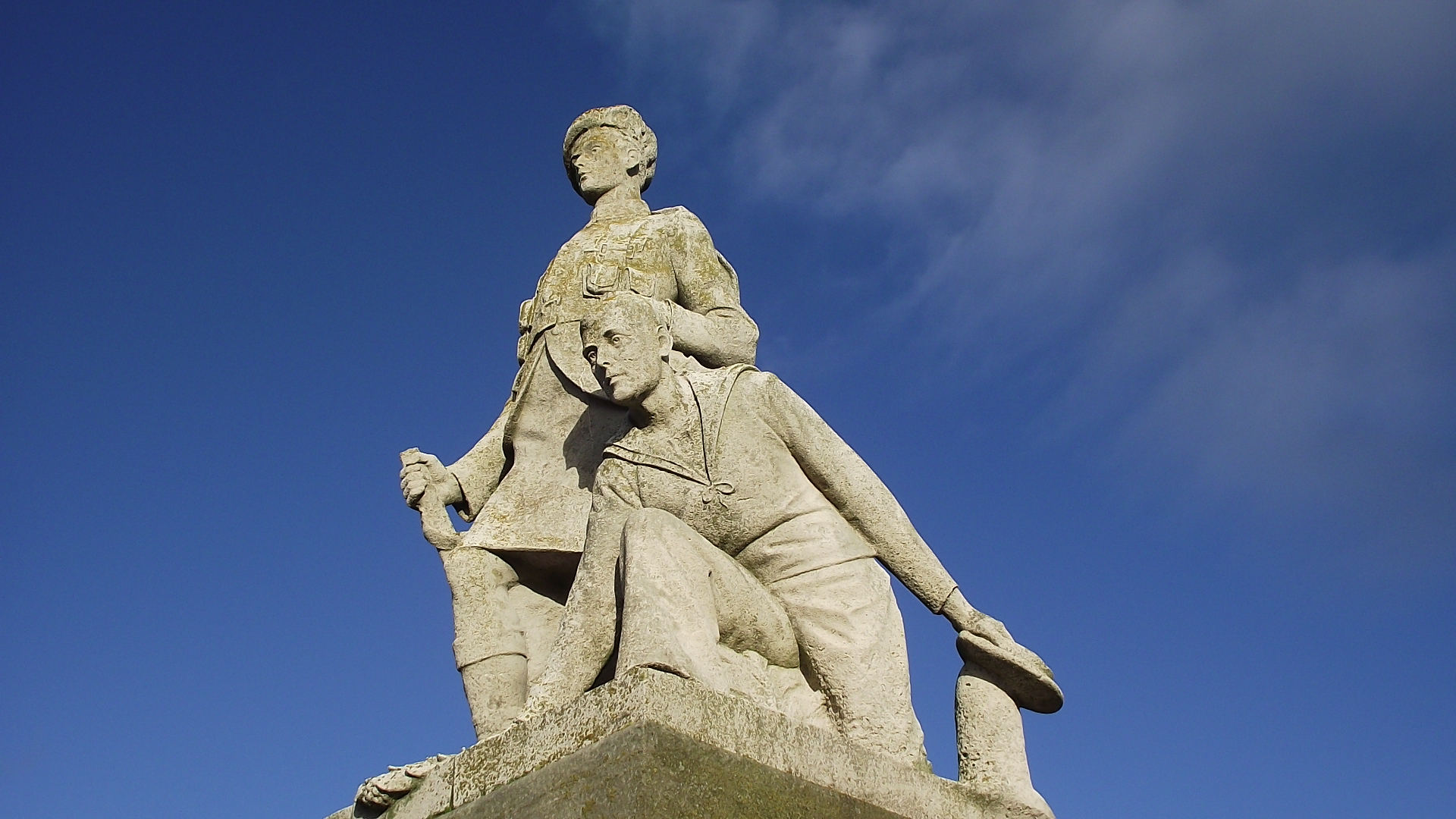
War memorial in Largs, North Ayrshire

After the memorials are erected and unveiled, the committee who raised them often passes them into the care of another organisation. In the case of civic memorials, they are passed on to the local Municipal Corporation or County Council who continues their maintenance (as Unitary Authorities) through the local community council. Oftentimes, the local branch of the Royal British Legion Scotland or other local volunteers help with the maintenance and upkeep of civic memorials. The Royal British Legion Scotland also runs an annual campaign called the "Best Kept War Memorial".

Non-civic memorials often remain in the care of churches, clubs, or private companies. When these organisations leave a building, refurbish it, or close, the future of war memorials in their care is not always assured.

Since the 1960s, church mergers and closures have sometimes meant that memorials integral to the buildings have been lost when the building was demolished. Sometimes, new memorials are created to replace old ones, such as at St George's Church in Edinburgh. In other cases, photographs of old memorials are all that remain when they are lost. Greenside Church in Edinburgh has photographs of the memorial windows of St James's, which were demolished along with the building in 1975. The roll of honour from St Mungo's Church is in private hands after it was left for salvage when the Lockhart Memorial Church in Edinburgh dissolved in 1984. Similarly, a roll of honour in Livingston was recovered from a rubbish skip after the Social Club it was in was refurbished in 2008 and the memorial was thrown away.

== Interest in Scottish war memorials ==
There are three organisations with a national interest in Scottish war memorials.

- UK National Inventory of War Memorials, also known as the UKNIWM, is based in the Imperial War Museum in London and records basic information regarding all of the UK's war memorials.
- War Memorials Trust was established to help local organisations with information on maintenance, conservation, listing, and cleaning of war memorials. In Scotland, it works with Historic Scotland in running a grants scheme for the conservation and repair of war memorials which includes restoring the legibility of inscriptions. However, routine maintenance is specifically excluded.
- The Scottish War Memorials Project was founded to record Scottish war memorials.

=== The Scottish War Memorials Project ===
This voluntary project, which began in December 2006, sought to photograph and record all of Scotland's war memorials and publish the records online for free. The Scottish War Memorials Project had over 4,900 war memorials recorded including nearly all the approximately 1,400 civic memorials in cities, towns, and villages across Scotland. The project was internet forum based and used photograph hosting websites. It had no running costs and was entirely voluntary.

== Examples of Scottish war memorials ==
Based on the UKNIWM's approximate total of 100,000 war memorials in the UK, there may be approximately 10,000 war memorials within Scotland. Below are non-exhaustive lists of some of these memorials.

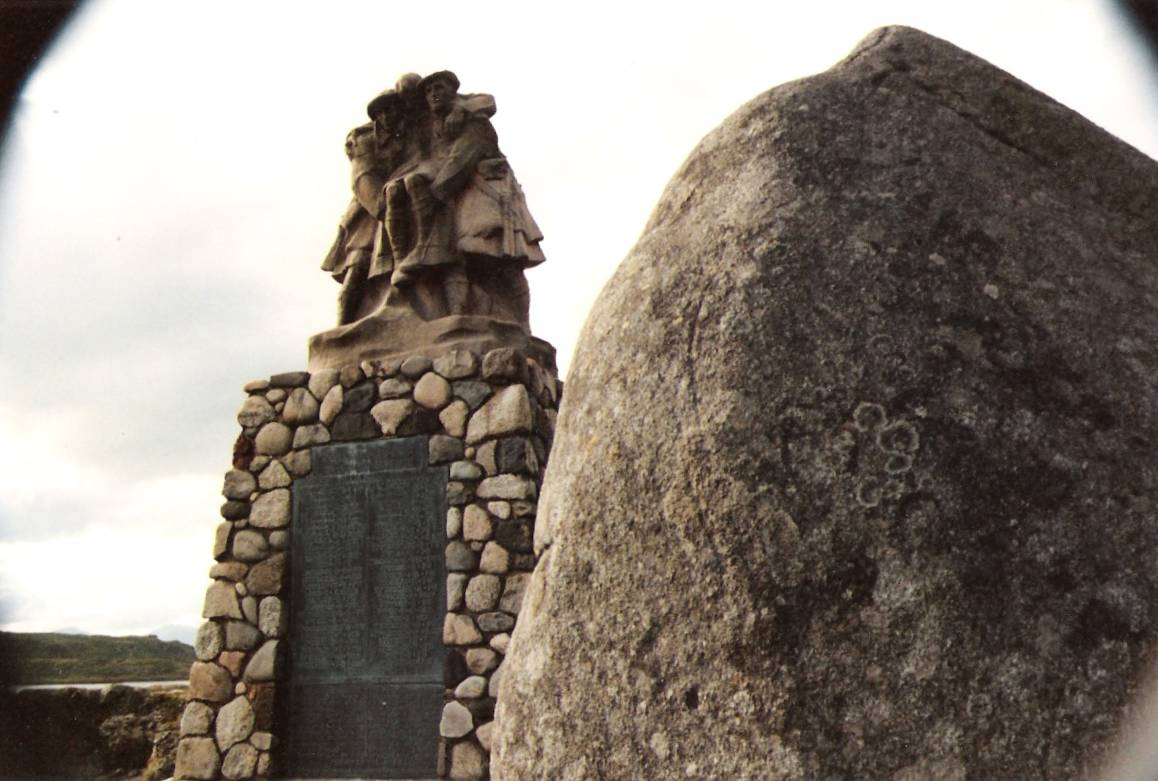
Oban War Memorial

=== Pre-First World War ===
- Battle of Drumclog Memorial
- Battle of Culloden Memorial
- Balmaclellan Crimean War Memorial

=== First World War ===
There are over 1,000 civic war memorials commemorating the First World War in Scotland, and hundreds more non-civic memorials.

- Alloa War Memorial
- Beith War Memorial
- Blairgowrie War Memorial
- Cameronians (Scottish Rifles) Memorial
- Crimond War Memorial
- City of Dundee War Memorial
- Kilmarnock War Memorial
- Kilwinning War Memorial
- Parish of Kildonan War Memorial
- Isle of Lewis War Memorial
- Maxwelltown War Memorial
- Oban War Memorial
- Scots American War Memorial
- Stewarton War Memorial
- War Memorial near Brabsterdoran
- Scottish National War Memorial, Edinburgh Castle. 148,270 names listed for 1914–1918

=== Spanish Civil War ===
- Edinburgh Spanish Civil War Memorial

=== Second World War ===
- Scottish National War Memorial, Edinburgh Castle. 57,726 names listed for 1939–1945
- Royal Scots Fusilier World War II Memorial
- Commando Memorial, Spean Bridge
- 5th Bn Seaforth Highlanders War Memorial
- XII Submarine Flotilla War Memorial

=== Post-Second World War to present ===
- Scottish National War Memorial, Edinburgh Castle. 783 names listed for wars since 1945.

== Scottish war memorials outside Scotland ==
War memorials to Scots and Scottish regiments may also be found outside Scotland.

- 51st (Highland) Division Monument (Beaumont-Hamel)
- The Liverpool Scottish memorial stone

=== Commonwealth War Graves Commission Memorials Commemorating Scots ===
The following memorials are examples of Commonwealth War Graves Commission memorials which list Scots war dead on their panels.

- Menin Gate – commemorating the defenders that died in the Ypres Salient, whose graves are unknown, in Ypres, Belgium.
- Malta Memorial – dedicated to Commonwealth aircrew who fought and lost their lives in the Mediterranean during the Second World War. Located in Valletta.
- Tower Hill Memorial – commemorating Merchant Seamen. Located in London.
- Chatham Naval Memorial – One of the three main Royal Navy memorials erected after the First World War.
- La Ferté-sous-Jouarre memorial – Located in France.

== See also ==
- Armed Forces Memorial
- Canadian war memorials
- Military history of Scotland
- Scottish National War Memorial
