= List of listed buildings in Kilmonivaig, Highland =

This is a list of listed buildings in the parish of Kilmonivaig in Highland, Scotland.

== List ==
Name	Location	Date Listed	Grid Ref. (Note: Sometimes known as OSGB36, the grid reference (where provided) is based on the British national grid reference system used by the Ordnance Survey. • "Guide to National Grid". Ordnance Survey. • "Get-a-map". Ordnance Survey.)	Geo-coordinates	Notes	LB Number (Note: Historic Environment Scotland assign a unique alphanumeric identifier to each designated site in Scotland, for listed buildings this always begins with "LB", for example "LB12345".)	Image
Suspension Foot-Bridge Over River Garry	Invergarry			57°04′04″N 4°48′17″W	Category B	6827	Upload another image
Suspension Footbridge Over River Garry By Hydro Dam	By Invergarry			57°04′33″N 4°50′40″W	Category C(S)	6828	Upload another image
Inverlochy Castle Hotel, Including Former Stables And Walled Garden	By Torlundy			56°50′43″N 5°03′05″W	Category B	6831	Upload another image See more images
Gate Lodge And Gate Piers, Inverlochy Castle	By Torlundy			56°50′37″N 5°02′59″W	Category C(S)	6832	Upload Photo
Great Glen Hydro Electric Scheme, Invergarry Power Station, Including Boundary Wall, Railings And Gates				57°04′19″N 4°46′27″W	Category B	6846	Upload Photo
Gairlochy, Mucomir Bridge Over River Lochy				56°54′36″N 4°59′06″W	Category A	6868	Upload Photo
Well Of The Seven Heads Monument (Tobar nan Ceann)	By Loch Oich			57°03′07″N 4°47′48″W	Category B	6825	Upload another image See more images
Invergarry, Roman Catholic Church Of St Finnan				57°04′02″N 4°47′24″W	Category B	6826	Upload Photo
Glengarry Castle Hotel North Lodge And Gate Piers	Invergarry			57°04′12″N 4°46′59″W	Category B	6848	Upload another image
Invergarry Tigh-Mhonaidh (Former Hospital)				57°04′14″N 4°48′35″W	Category B	6858	Upload Photo
Invergloy, Low Bridge Over Gloy River				56°56′06″N 4°55′11″W	Category B	6829	Upload Photo
Loch Laggan Hydro Electric Dam	Loch Laggan			56°53′22″N 4°40′23″W	Category B	6835	Upload another image See more images
Keppoch Barn	Roybridge			56°53′14″N 4°50′31″W	Category A	6837	Upload Photo
Glengarry Castle Hotel (Formerly Invergarry House) Stables And Sundial	Invergarry			57°04′08″N 4°46′41″W	Category B	6847	Upload another image See more images
Invergarry, Invergarry Church Of Scotland				57°04′10″N 4°47′55″W	Category B	6855	Upload Photo
Invergarry, School And Master's House				57°04′09″N 4°48′03″W	Category C(S)	6856	Upload Photo
Invergarry 1, 2, 3, 4, Old Ground Cottages				57°04′08″N 4°48′10″W	Category B	6857	Upload Photo
Caledonian Canal, Laggan Locks, Glenjade Cottage				57°01′35″N 4°49′33″W	Category C(S)	6866	Upload Photo
Glenlochy Distillery, Reception Office, Kiln And Adjoining Bonded Warehouse	Fort William			56°49′20″N 5°05′39″W	Category B	6869	Upload another image See more images
Leckroy Bridge Over Allt Dearg	Glen Roy			56°59′39″N 4°43′10″W	Category B	6870	Upload Photo
Invergarry, Old Mill By Post Office/Shop				57°04′13″N 4°48′39″W	Category C(S)	6860	Upload Photo
Caledonian Canal, Laggan Locks, Canal Cottage				57°01′34″N 4°49′34″W	Category C(S)	6865	Upload Photo
Spean Bridge Station And Signal Box	Spean Bridge			56°53′24″N 4°55′18″W	Category C(S)	51615	Upload another image See more images
High Bridge Over River Spean	By Spean Bridge			56°53′43″N 4°57′21″W	Category B	6841	Upload another image See more images
Invergarry, Nursery Cottages				57°04′14″N 4°47′22″W	Category B	6852	Upload Photo
Invergarry, Old School Cottages				57°04′10″N 4°47′49″W	Category C(S)	6854	Upload Photo
Invergarry, Post Office And Shop				57°04′13″N 4°48′40″W	Category C(S)	6859	Upload Photo
Invergloy, New Bridge, Carrying A82 Over River Gloy				56°56′56″N 4°55′13″W	Category B	6830	Upload Photo
Kilfinnan Burial Ground And Mcdonnell Mausoleum				57°01′14″N 4°50′14″W	Category C(S)	6833	Upload Photo
Letterfinlay	By Loch Lochy			56°58′53″N 4°52′37″W	Category B	6834	Upload another image
Drynachan, Invergarry	By Loch Oich			57°04′48″N 4°45′44″W	Category C(S)	6845	Upload another image
Invergarry, Invergarry Castle				57°03′56″N 4°46′51″W	Category B	6850	Upload Photo
Invergarry, Bridge Carrying A82 Over River Garry				57°04′10″N 4°47′34″W	Category B	6861	Upload Photo
Caledonian Canal, Gairlochy, Canal House				56°54′47″N 4°59′44″W	Category B	6863	Upload Photo
Caledonian Canal, Gairlochy, Canal Cottage				56°54′47″N 4°59′46″W	Category C(S)	6864	Upload Photo
Gairlochy Burial Ground				56°54′44″N 4°59′48″W	Category C(S)	6867	Upload Photo
Keppoch House	Roybridge			56°53′14″N 4°50′39″W	Category C(S)	6836	Upload Photo
Spean Bridge Over River Spean	Spean Bridge			56°53′33″N 4°55′14″W	Category B	6840	Upload Photo
Glengarry Castle Hotel, West Lodge And Gate Piers	Invergarry			57°03′52″N 4°47′02″W	Category B	6849	Upload another image
Cille Choirill, Roman Catholic Church Of St Cyril And Burial Ground, Achlauchrach	Glen Spean			56°53′29″N 4°46′51″W	Category B	6862	Upload another image See more images
Greenfield Farm, Cruck Framed Barn	By Loch Garry			57°03′38″N 4°58′04″W	Category C(S)	50834	Upload another image
Roman Catholic Church Of St Margaret	Roybridge			56°53′30″N 4°50′30″W	Category B	6838	Upload another image See more images
Presbytery To Roman Catholic Church Of St Margaret	Roybridge			56°53′31″N 4°50′28″W	Category C(S)	6839	Upload Photo
Commando Memorial	By Spean Bridge			56°53′53″N 4°56′39″W	Category A	6842	Upload another image See more images
By Torlundy Tomacharich Cottages (Former Almhouses)				56°51′28″N 5°02′55″W	Category C(S)	6843	Upload Photo
Turret Bridge Over River Turret	Glen Roy			56°59′15″N 4°44′10″W	Category B	6844	Upload another image
Invergarry Old Invergarry Bridge Over River Garry				57°04′13″N 4°47′00″W	Category C(S)	6851	Upload Photo
Invergarry, Inn On The Garry (Formerly Invergarry Hotel)				57°04′11″N 4°47′40″W	Category C(S)	6853	Upload Photo
Leitirfearn, Aberchalder	By Loch Oich			57°04′21″N 4°45′44″W	Category C(S)	48927	Upload another image See more images
Great Glen Hydro Electric Scheme, Quoich Dam And Intake Gatehouse Towers	Loch Quoich			57°04′17″N 5°11′04″W	Category B	51704	Upload another image See more images

== Key ==
The scheme for classifying buildings in Scotland is:

- Category A: "buildings of national or international importance, either architectural or historic; or fine, little-altered examples of some particular period, style or building type."
- Category B: "buildings of regional or more than local importance; or major examples of some particular period, style or building type, which may have been altered."
- Category C: "buildings of local importance; lesser examples of any period, style, or building type, as originally constructed or moderately altered; and simple traditional buildings which group well with other listed buildings."

In March 2016 there were 47,288 listed buildings in Scotland. Of these, 8% were Category A, and 50% were Category B, with the remaining 42% being Category C.

== See also ==
- List of listed buildings in Highland
