= Commando Memorial =

Monument in Lochaber, Scotland

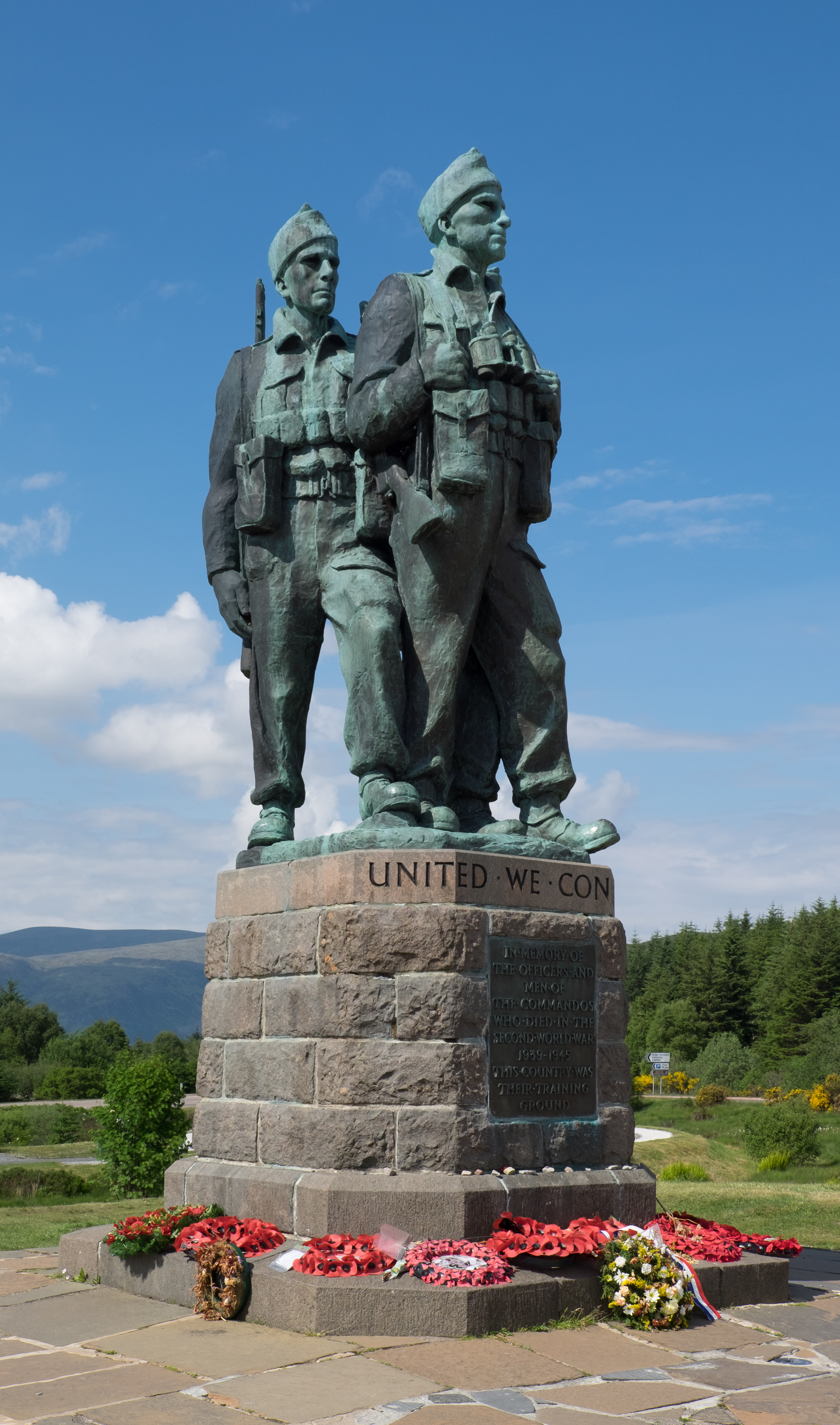
- The memorial in June 2016
- Interactive map of Commando Memorial
- Location: Lochaber, Scottish Highlands
- Coordinates: 56°53′52.42″N 4°56′38.51″W
- Designer: Scott Sutherland
- Type: statue
- Material: bronze sculpture
- Height: 17 ft (5.2 m)
- Beginning date: 1949
- Completion date: 1951
- Opening date: 1952
- Dedicated to: British Commandos

The Commando Memorial is a Category A listed monument in Lochaber, Scotland, dedicated to the men of the original British Commando Forces raised during World War II. Situated around a mile from Spean Bridge, it overlooks the training areas of the Commando Training Depot established in 1942 at Achnacarry Castle. Unveiled in 1952 by the Queen Elizabeth the Queen Mother, it is one of Scotland's best-known monuments, both as a war memorial and as a tourist attraction offering views of Ben Nevis and Aonach Mòr.

== History ==
In 1949, the sculptor Scott Sutherland won a competition open to all Scottish sculptors for the commission, The Commando Memorial. Sutherland's design won first prize of £200. The base of the bronze statue is inscribed with the date of 1951. The sculpture was cast by H.H. Martyn & Co. The memorial was officially unveiled by the Queen Mother on 27 September 1952. The monument was first designated as a listed structure on 5 October 1971, and was upgraded to a Category A listing on 15 August 1996. On 18 November 1993 a further plaque was added to mark the Freedom of Lochaber being given to the Commando Association. On 27 March 2010 a two-mile (three-kilometre) war memorial path was opened connecting the Commando Memorial to the former High Bridge built by General Wade, where the first shots were fired in the Jacobite Rising of 1745 in the Highbridge Skirmish.

== Description ==
The monument consists of a cast bronze sculpture of three Commandos in characteristic dress complete with cap comforter, webbing and rifle, standing atop a stone plinth looking south towards Ben Nevis. The soldier at the front is thought to depict Commando Jack Lewington who frequently attended Remembrance Services at the monument during his lifetime. One of the other two soldiers is Frank Nicholls (rank unknown); the other is Regimental Sergeant Major Sidney Hewlett. Originally serving with the Welsh Guards, he was hand picked to be one of the founding NCOs of the commandos, and was also held in high regard and noted several times by Eisenhower. The entire monument is 17 feet (5.2 metres) tall. The monument has been variously described as a huge, striking and iconic statue.

"United we conquer" is inscribed around the top of the stone plinth, while the original plaque on the stone plinth reads: "In memory of the officers and men of the commandos who died in the Second World War 1939–1945. This country was their training ground."

== Location ==
Spean Bridge is a small village around eight miles (thirteen kilometres) northeast of Fort William in the Scottish Highlands, and the memorial is located approximately 1 mile (1.5 kilometres) northwest of Spean Bridge, at the junction of the A82 road and the B8004 road. It is a prominent landmark visible from the A82, and the site itself offers views across the River Spean valley to the peaks of Ben Nevis and Aonach Mòr to the south.

The location was chosen because it is on the route from Spean Bridge railway station to the former Commando Training Centre at nearby Achnacarry Castle. Arriving prospective Commandos would disembark after a 14-hour journey, load their kit bags onto waiting trucks and then speed-march the seven miles (eleven kilometres) to the training centre in full kit with weapon, weighing a total of 36 pounds (16 kilograms). Anyone not completing it within 60 minutes was immediately RTU'd (returned to unit).

== Memorial ==
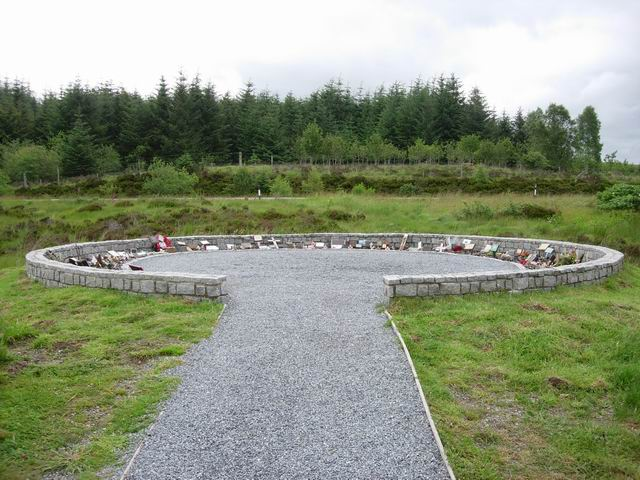
The Garden of Remembrance, 2007

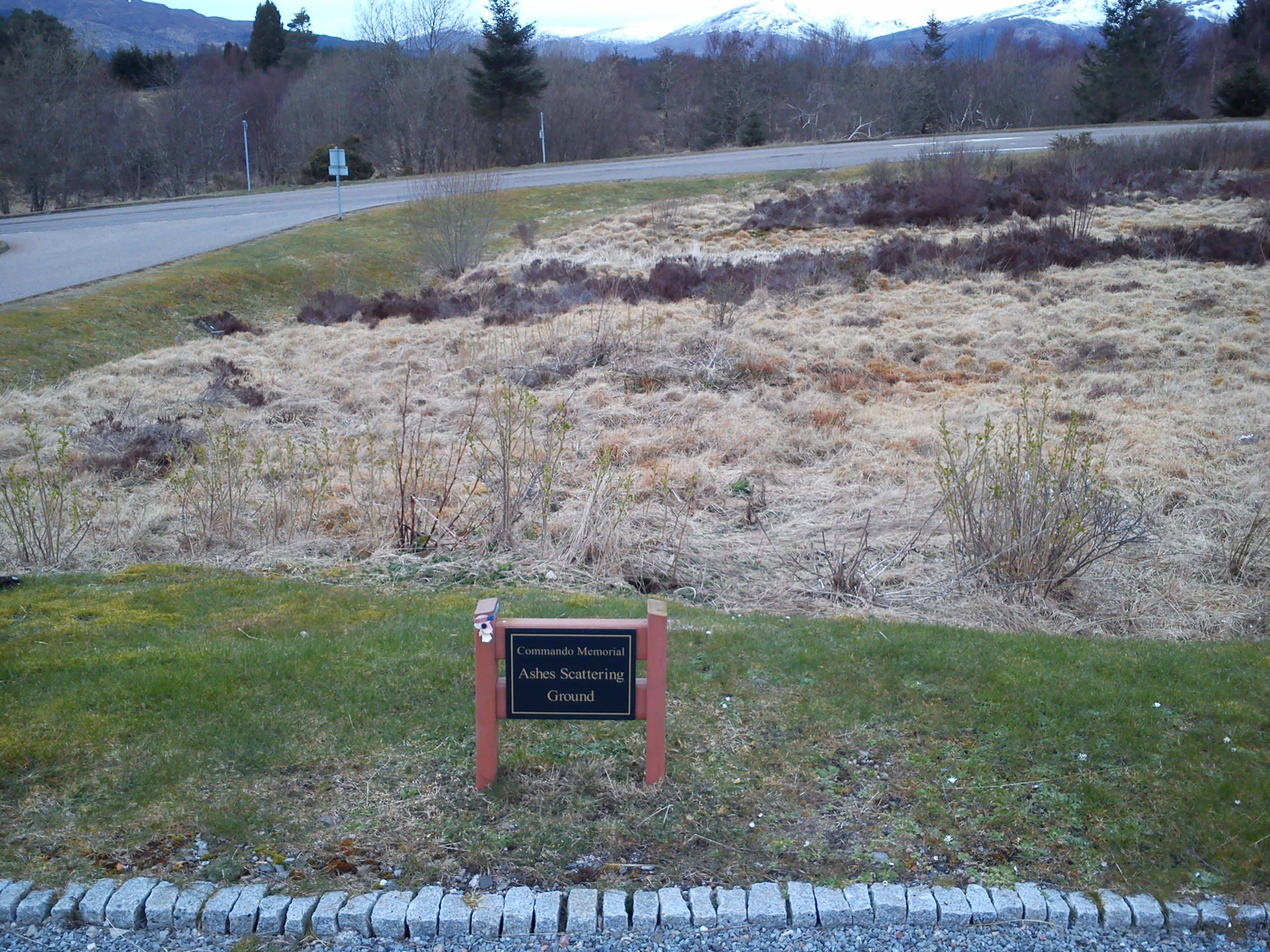
Ashes scattering area at the Commando Memorial, 2015

The monument stands as a memorial to the British Commandos who trained all around the Lochaber region which the monument overlooks, while they were based at the Achnacarry Commando Training Centre established in 1942. As such it is used as site for memorial services, including the 60th anniversary of D-Day, and Remembrance Day ceremonies.

A Garden of Remembrance, which was subsequently added to the site, is used by many surviving World War II Commandos as the designated final resting place for their ashes. It has also been used as a place where many families have scattered ashes and erected tributes to loved ones who belonged to contemporary Commando units and who have died in more recent conflicts such as the Falklands War or in Afghanistan and Iraq.

== Sculptor ==
Scott Sutherland (15 May 1910 – 10 October 1984) was a Scottish sculptor born in Wick, Highland and schooled at Gray's School of Art, the Edinburgh College of Art and the École des Beaux-Arts in Paris. After touring Europe and winning two out of the five open commissions offered for the 1938 Empire Exhibition, he served in the Army during World War II, working alongside commandos. After the war he took the post of Head of Sculpture at Duncan of Jordanstone College in 1947. Sutherland was elected ARSA (Associate of the Royal Scottish Academy) in 1950 and FRBS (Fellow of the Royal British Society of Sculptors) in 1961. In 1975 he retired, and died nine years later in hospital in Dundee.

== See also ==
- List of Category A listed buildings in Highland
- List of post-war Category A listed buildings in Scotland
- Scottish war memorials
