= Ewen Cameron of Lochiel =

Scottish highland chief and soldier

The Much Honoured Sir Ewen Cameron of Lochiel
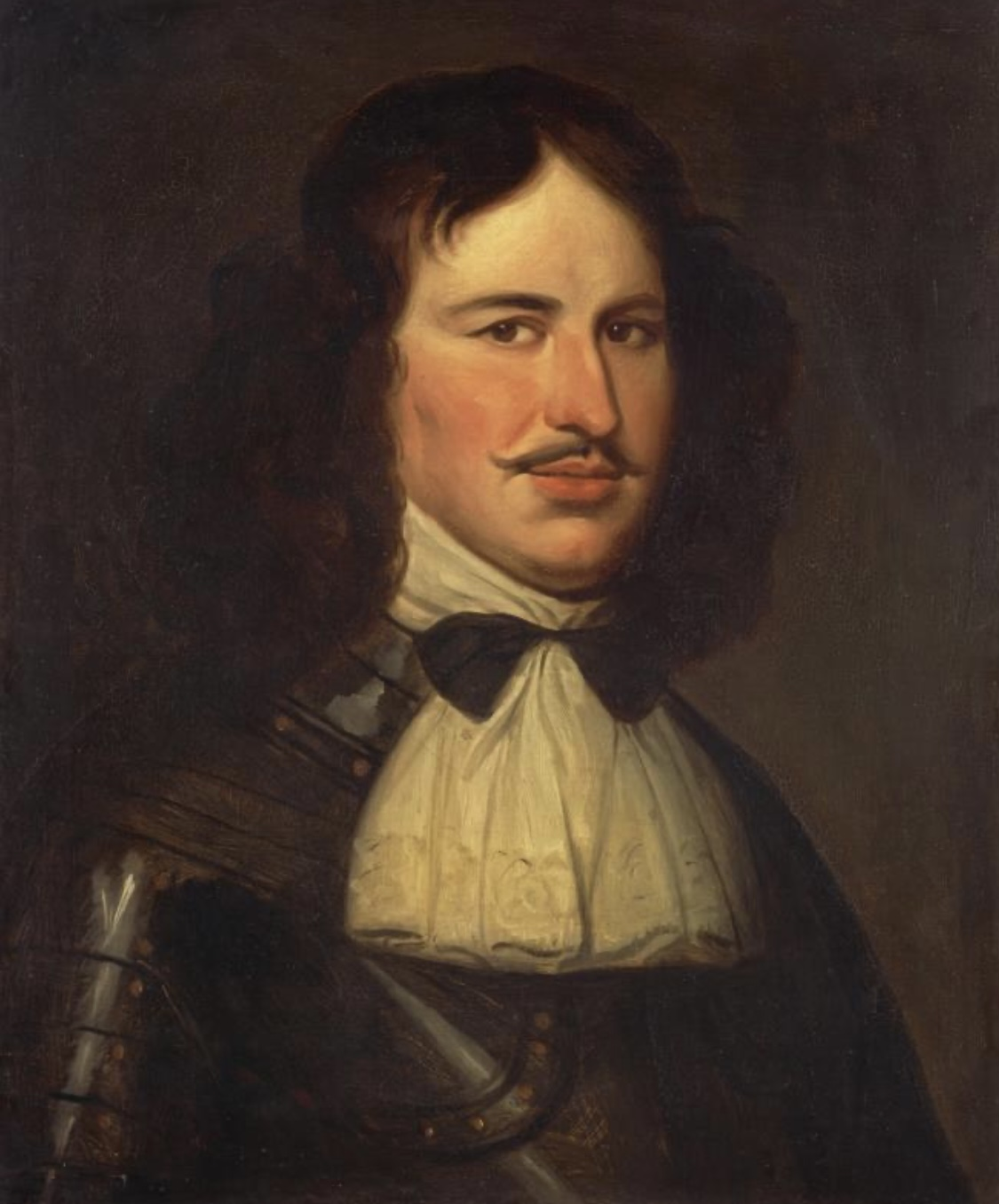
- Portrait of Cameron
- Born: February 1629; Kilchurn Castle, Argyll, Scotland
- Died: c. February 1719 (aged 90); Achnacarry Castle, Lochaber, Scotland
- Resting place: Loch Eil, Lochaber
- Other names: The Ulysses of the Highlands; Eòghann Dubh (Black Ewen)
- Occupations: Chief of Clan Cameron, laird, soldier
- Spouse(s): Mary Macdonald; Isobel Maclean; Jean Barclay
- Children: 16, including John Cameron of Lochiel
- Parent(s): John Cameron; Margaret Campbell

Sir Ewen Cameron of Lochiel (Scottish Gaelic: Eòghann Dubh Mac Dhòmhnaill Dubh; February 1629 – c. February 1719) was a Scottish soldier and the 17th chief of Clan Cameron. He fought during the Wars of the Three Kingdoms and was one of the principal Jacobite leaders during the 1689 Rising.

Lochiel is regarded as one of the most formidable Scottish clan chiefs of all time, with Lord Macaulay praising him as the "Ulysses of the Highlands". An incident demonstrating his strength and ferocity in single combat, when he bit out the throat of an enemy, is used by Sir Walter Scott in Lady of the Lake (canto v.).

== Early years ==
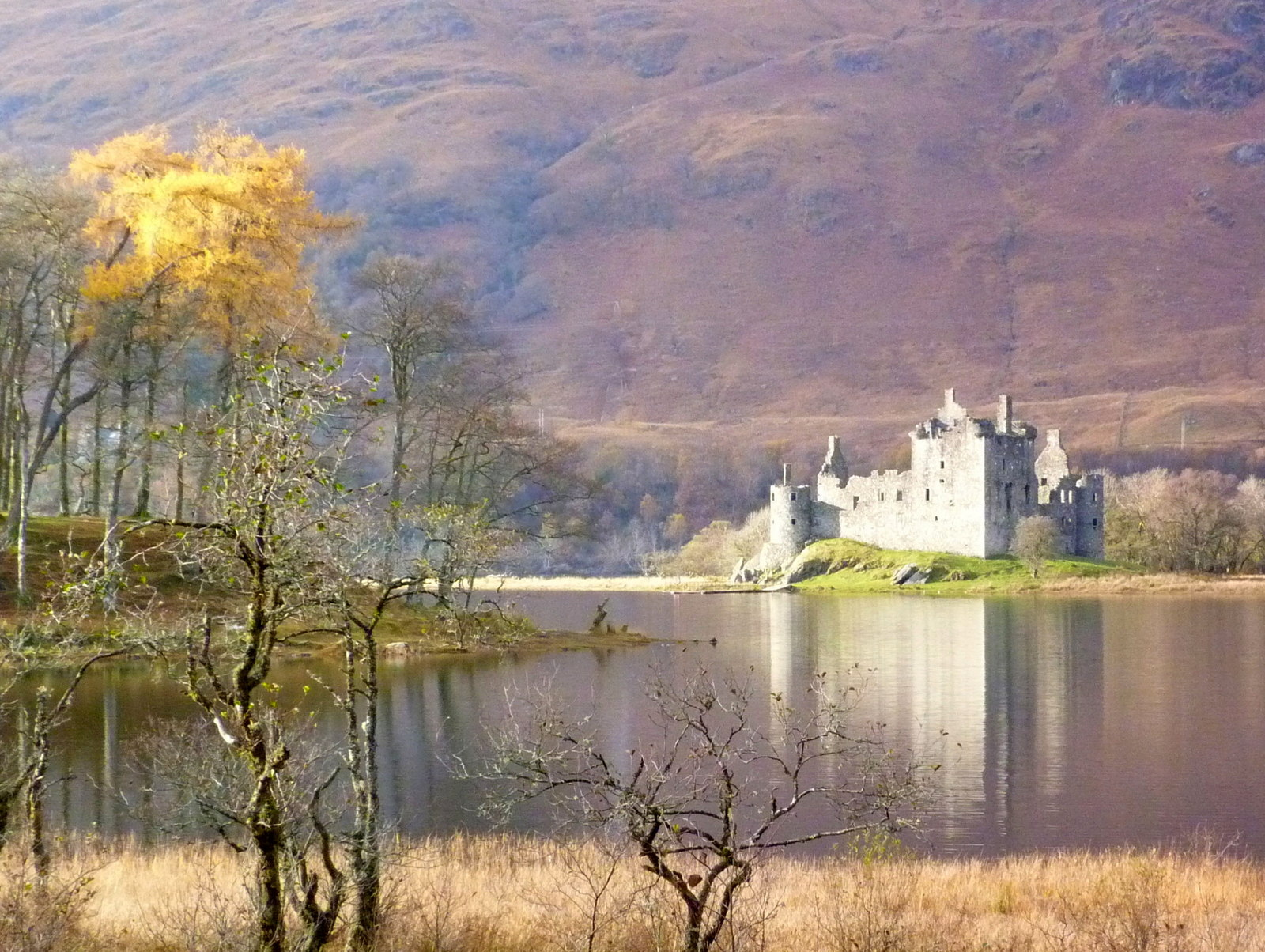
Kilchurn Castle, Argyll, seat of the Campbells of Glenorchy

Ewen Cameron of Lochiel was born in February 1629 at Kilchurn Castle, Loch Awe, the seat of his mother's family. He was the son of John Cameron (died 1635) and Margaret Campbell, daughter of Sir Robert Campbell, 3rd Baronet. He was the grandson of Allan Cameron of Lochiel, 16th Chief (c. 1567–1647), an elderly chief respected for many affrays.

His father having predeceased him, Ewen was initially fostered by his brethren, the MacMartins of Letterfinlay, but then spent much of his youth under the "guardianship" (as a hostage to keep the Camerons in check) of the Marquess of Argyll at Inveraray, by whose instruction he was tutored. He was said to have been excessively fond of hunting, duelling and fencing—less inclined towards his books—yet still bore great intelligence and cunning.

In 1647, he succeeded his grandfather as the chief of the Camerons, being one of the most important Highland clans.

== Appearance and character ==
Lord Lovat, who was at the court of Versailles, claimed that Lochiel bore a striking resemblance to Louis XIV, stating that "the resemblance was nearer than commonly that between two brothers; with this difference, that Sir Ewen was of a darker complexion, more brawny, and of a larger size". Lord Macaulay, although a Whig, wrote in praise of Lochiel, stating "Sir Ewen Cameron of Lochiel was in personal qualities unrivalled among the Celtic Princes. He was a gracious master, a trusty ally, a terrible enemy". He was described as the "Ulysses of the Highlands" by Macaulay in reference to enormous strength and size.

James Philip of Almerieclos, a standard-bearer in the 1689 rebellion, describes Lochiel's intimidating appearance and "Spanish countenance", with "flashing eyes and a moustache curled as the moon horns".

== Wars of the Three Kingdoms ==
=== Montrose ===
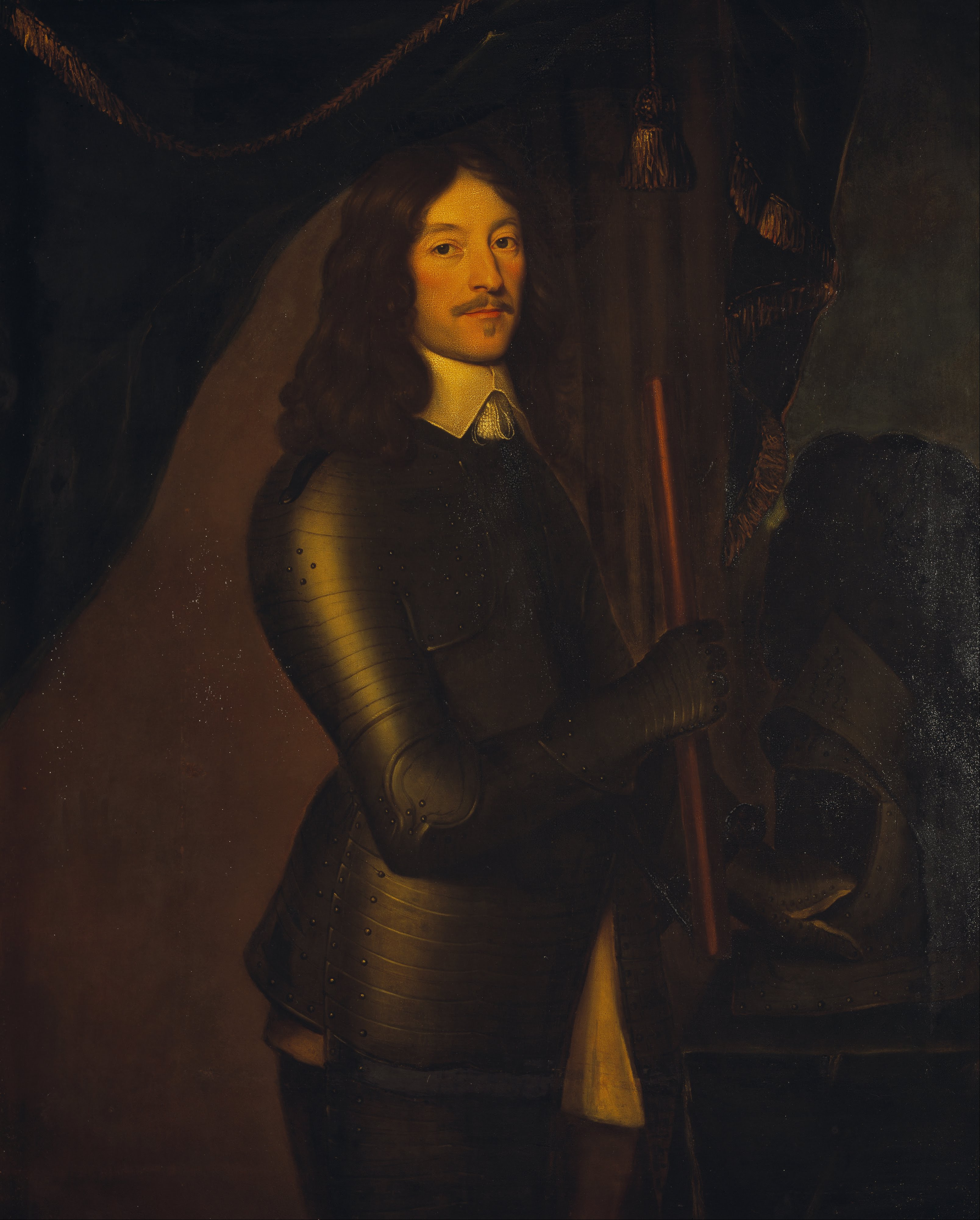
The Marquis of Montrose

The Camerons were always strong supporters of the House of Stuart. Ewen, Master of Lochiel witnessed the Battle of Inverlochy in 1645 during which his grandfather sent 300 highlanders to Montrose's aid, while he was forced to accompany Argyll. That same year, he also witnessed Philiphaugh, the disastrous Royalist defeat. It is said that he developed Royalist sympathies after a secret meeting with Sir Robert Spottiswood on the eve of his execution by the Covenanters. Furthermore, like many others, he was greatly inspired by James Graham, Marquis of Montrose.

When Allan Cameron of Lochiel died in 1647, Lochiel finally left the clutches of Argyll and returned to his homeland of Lochaber, whence he was received joyously by his clansfolk. However Macdonald of Keppoch and Macdonald of Glengarry, thinking they could manipulate the novice Cameron chief, refused to pay their annual tribute to Lochiel who, in response, marched several hundred of his clansmen and forced the rebellious Macdonalds of Lochaber into submission.

In April, 1650, Montrose was defeated at Carbisdale, betrayed, and shortly thereafter, hanged, drawn and quartered at Argyll's orders. Later that year, Lochiel received word from the exiled King Charles, requesting that he rally his men and join the Royalist army assembling at Stirling, whose defeat at Inverkeithing in 1651 led to Charles's fatal march to Worcester.

== Interregnum period ==
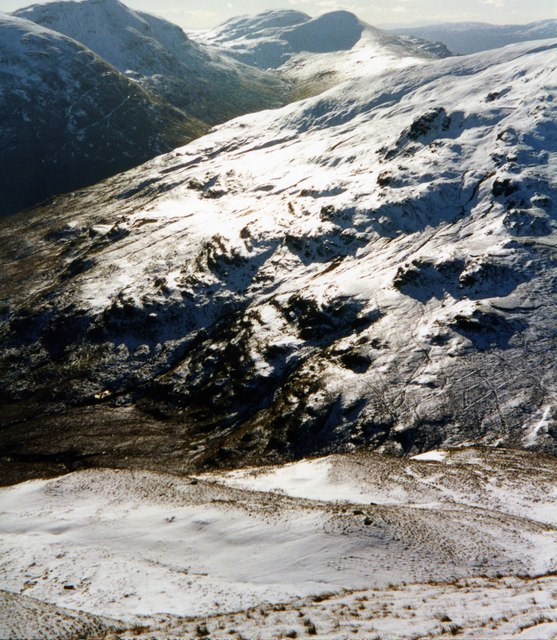
Tullich Hill where Lochiel bravely held the narrow and steep pass, inflicting heavy losses on Lilburne's forces

=== Glencairn's Rising ===
Lochiel was present at a meeting of Scottish nobles at Lochearn in August, 1653, in which they elected to rebel against the Protectorate and restore the exiled King Charles to the throne. As such, he joined the army of William Cunningham, 9th Earl of Glencairn in the Royalist rising of 1653 to 1654, bringing with him several hundred Cameron warriors.

At the Battle of Tullich on 10 February 1654, Lochiel was second-in-command to Glencairn and had the honour of commanding the outpost. He held the mountainous pass with his highlanders against the numerically superior forces of Robert Lilburne who was ultimately forced to retreat. He was personally commended by King Charles for his actions at Tullich, and hailed as the "deliverer of the Highland army".

=== Further resistance ===
Lochiel continued fighting with Glencairn until 1654, when the latter was arrested for duelling and replaced in command by John Middleton. Among those involved in affrays was Lochiel's future father-in-law David Barclay, an officer serving under Middleton. At the same time, George Monck became Governor of Scotland and kept the rebels hemmed in the Highlands. In a form of guerrilla warfare, Lochiel continued to resist for the next four years, becoming a paragon of Royalist resistance in the Highlands.

A famous fight between Lochiel and a roundhead occurred during this period. He had encountered a group of Monck's soldiers gathering firewood by Loch Eil, deep into Cameron territory, and a skirmish ensued. Lochiel became separated from his men and grappled with an English officer who threw him onto his back. Supposedly, Lochiel lunged at his victim's throat, biting down viciously and not letting go until he had torn out his windpipe for the 'sweetest bite ever he had.' He then proceeded to massacre a number of the garrison at Fort William and have their bodies mutilated and displayed as warning.

Previously based at Tor Castle, Lochiel built a new seat at Achnacarry in 1655 in order to keep his men further away from the government troops. It was only upon the death of Oliver Cromwell in 1658 that he did submit to general Monck and was received for his chivalrous conduct during the Civil War. Soon after, Lochiel accompanied Monck to London where the General called a meeting of Parliament to discuss the new status quo. After lengthy discussion and debate it was decided that the King would be invited back from exile and that the Royal House of Stuart would be restored to the throne after a Republican Interregnum period.

== Restoration period ==
=== Mackintosh feud ===
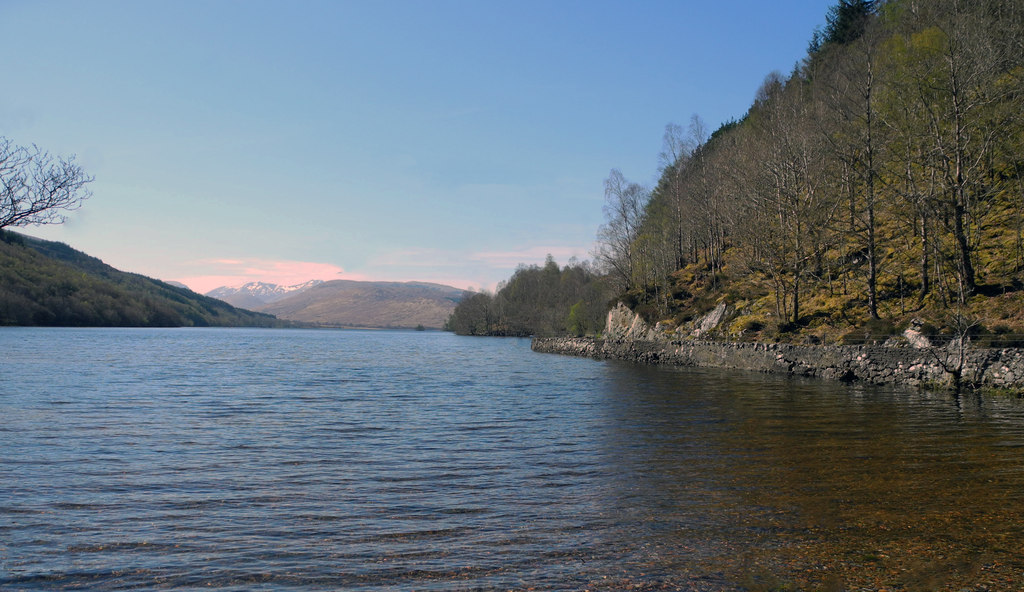
Loch Arkaig, Lochaber

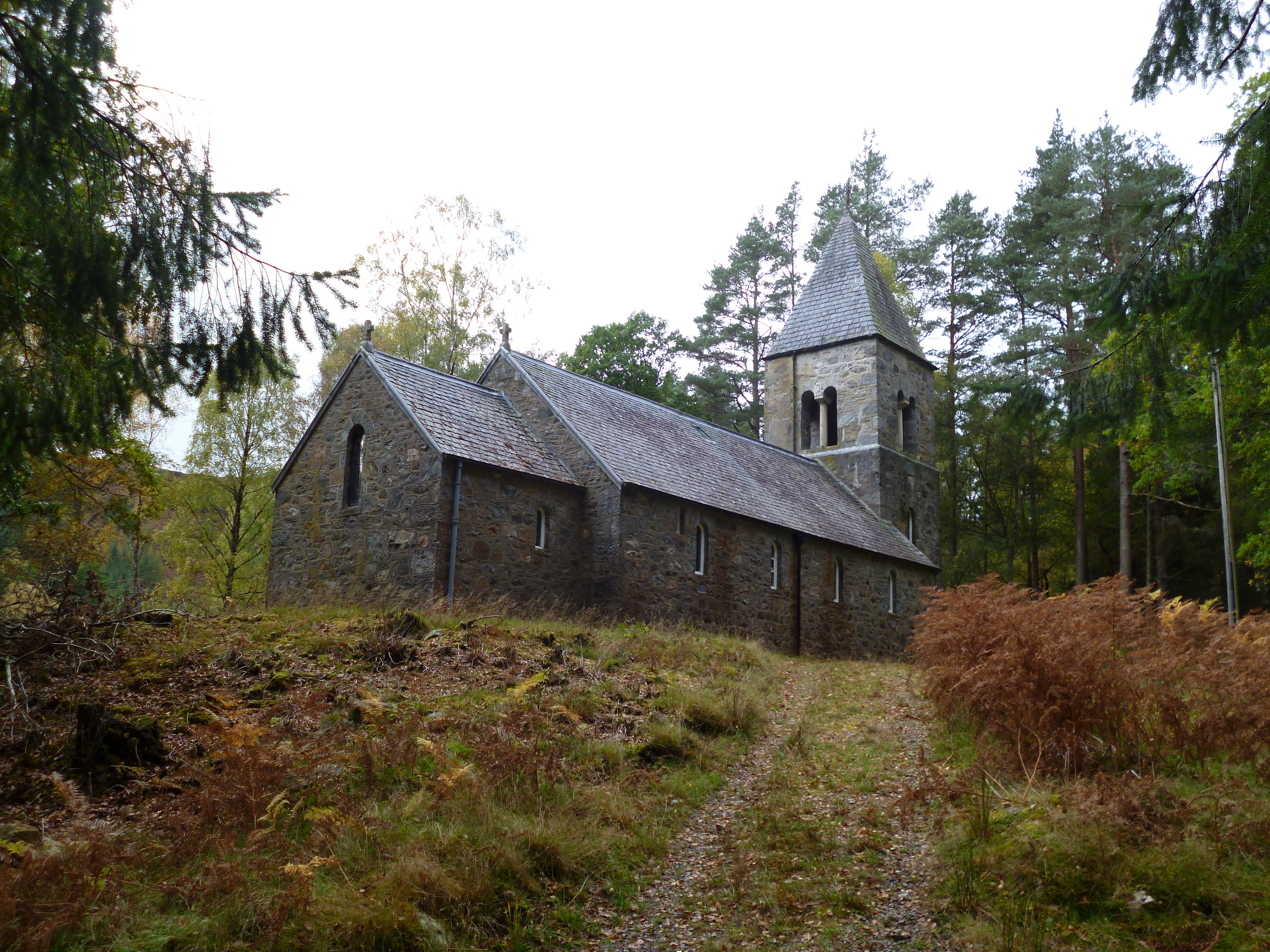
The old church at Achnacarry

Clan Cameron and Clan Mackintosh had been involved in a bitter, 360-year feud which began over the disputed lands of Loch Arkaig in Lochaber. On 20 September 1665, Lochiel ended this infamous feud with Clan Mackintosh after the stand-off at the Fords of Arkaig near Achnacarry. After this he was responsible for keeping the peace between his clansmen and their former enemies. However in 1668, whilst he was away at court in London, a feud broke out between Clan Donald and hostile elements of Clan Mackintosh, who headed the confederation of clans known as Clan Chattan. Lochiel’s clansmen contributed to the MacDonald victory against the Mackintosh’ at the Battle of Mulroy, often considered to be the last clan battle.

=== Last Scottish wolf ===
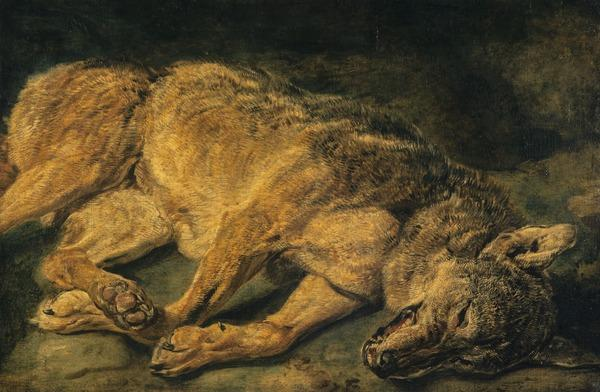
Portrait of the dead wolf by Jan Fyt

In 1680 while hunting in Killiecrankie, Perthshire (or in Lochaber according to other accounts) Lochiel was said to have killed the last wolf in Scotland.

=== At Achnacarry and Court ===
The famous exploits of Lochiel were recited by Gaelic bards at his newly-built house of Achnacarry. One such bard described Achnacarry as "the generous house of feasting, pillared hall of princes, where wine goes round freely in gleaming glasses, music resounding under its rafters."

In 1681, Lochiel was knighted by James, Duke of York (later James II and VII). According to Balhaldie, after complimenting him on the successful outcome of his feud with the Mackintosh, he asked for Lochiel's sword and attempted to draw it unsuccessfully; the Duke, after a second attempt gave it back to Lochiel and said "that his sword never used to be so uneasy to draw when the crown wanted his services". Lochiel unsheathed the sword and offered it to the Duke, who thereupon knighted him.

== Jacobite period ==
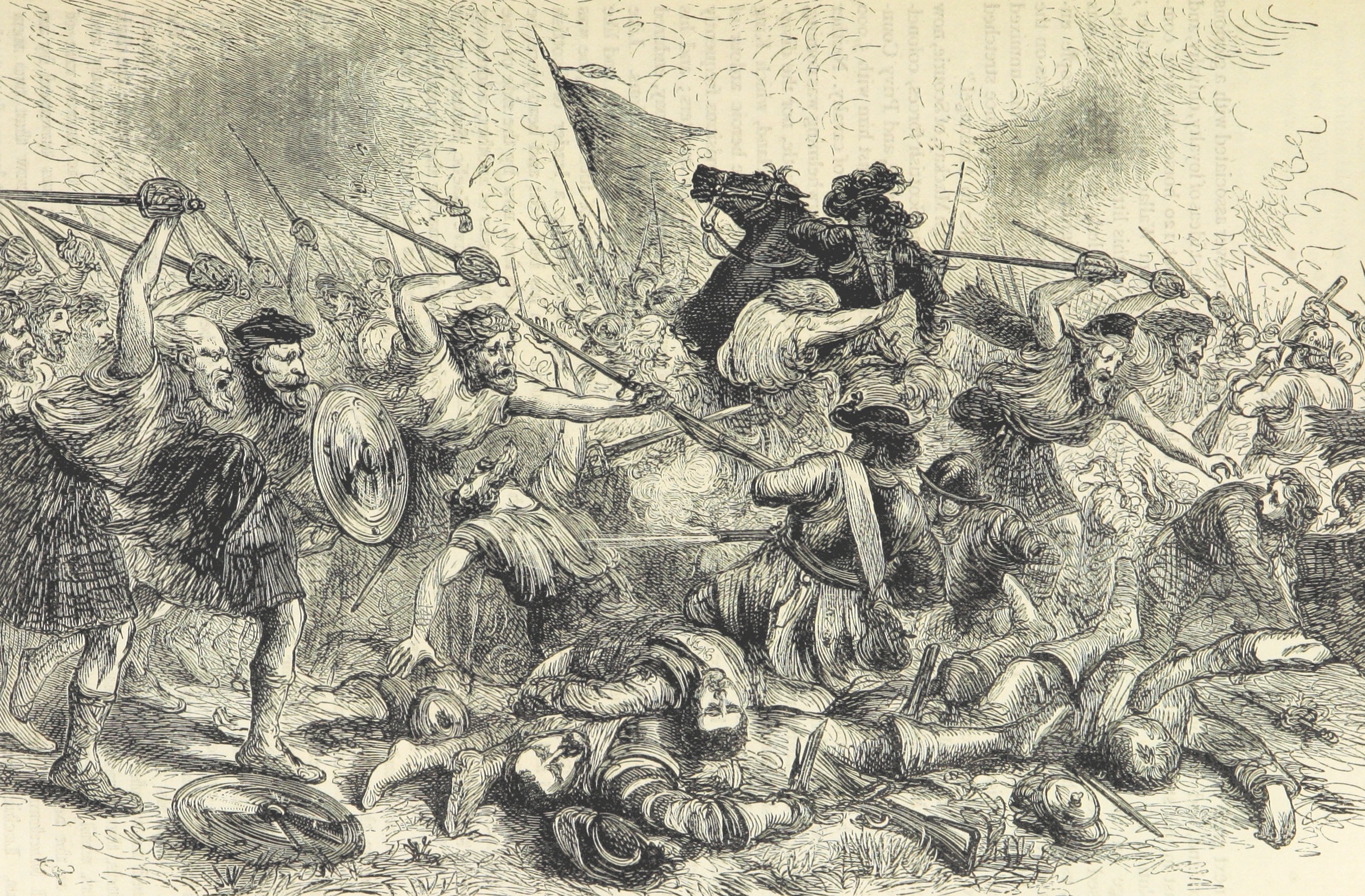
The Battle of Killiecrankie, which Cameron fought in

The Glorious Revolution was a disaster for Lochiel and Clan Cameron, whose support had always been for the Stuart monarchy. In 1688, the Stuart King James VII and II was overthrown by William of Orange (In 1714, the Stuarts were then replaced by the Hanoverians). Lochiel, as a fervent Stuart loyalist, became one of the principal commanders in the Jacobite rising of 1689, having managed to rally a confederation of Highland clans loyal to that cause.

Commanding his force of highlanders, Lochiel fought with John Graham of Claverhouse, Viscount Dundee (better known as "Bonnie Dundee") at the Battle of Killiecrankie – a stunning victory marred by Claverhouse’s death. The Jacobite rebellion collapsed soon after as a result of Claverhouse's death, arguments among the remaining leaders and the inept military leadership of Alexander Cannon. By this time Sir Ewen, nearly sixty years old, had started to give his son John Cameron, Master of Lochiel greater responsibilities as he was unable to participate physically in military action. John Cameron led the clan for the remainder of the 1689 rebellion, and later also for the 1715 and 1719 risings.

In 1717, John Cameron was made Lord Lochiel in the Jacobite peerage by Prince James in recognition of Cameron loyalty to the Jacobite cause.

== Death ==
Sir Ewen died of natural causes in 1719 at the age of ninety. He was buried with great ceremony at an ancient burial ground on the shores of Loch Eil. It was reported that thousands of Highlanders and thirteen pipers gathered to his funeral.

== Family ==
Sir Ewen married three times and had sixteen children. He married firstly Mary Macdonald, daughter of Sir Donald Macdonald, 1st Baronet, in a traditional Gaelic wedding ceremony of great splendour; she was said to have been very beautiful, but died in 1657 without issue. His second wife was Isobel Maclean, daughter of Sir Lachlan Maclean, 1st Baronet, and they had seven children before her death c. 1675. His final wife was Jean Barclay, daughter of David Barclay, who he married at Edinburgh on 2 January 1685.

Issue with Isobel Maclean:

- John Cameron of Lochiel (1663–1747), succeeded as chief and was the father of Donald Cameron of Lochiel otherwise known as the Gentle Lochiel, who played an important role in the 1745 Jacobite rising
- Major Donald Cameron of Clunes (died 1719), officer of the Dutch service who fought against his father at Killiecrankie
- Allan Cameron (died 1730), a Jacobite agent and courtier, married Isobel Fraser, daughter of Lord Lovat, and died in Rome
- Margaret Cameron, married Alexander MacGregor Drummond of Balhaldie, ephemeral chief of Clan Gregor
- Anne Cameron, married Allan Maclean, 10th of Ardgour
- Catherine Cameron, married William Macdonald, son of Macdonald of Sleat
- Janet Cameron, married John Grant, 6th of Glenmoriston

Issue with Jean Barclay:

- James Cameron, died young
- Ludovick Cameron of Torcastle (died 1753), Jacobite officer who fought alongside his nephew during the 1745 rising
- Christian Cameron, married Allan Cameron, 3rd of Glendessary, mother of famed Jean Cameron of Glendessary
- Jean Cameron, married Lachlan Macpherson, Chief of Clan Macpherson, and father of Cluny MacPherson
- Isobel Cameron, married Archibald Cameron, 1st of Dungallon
- Lucia Cameron, married Patrick Campbell, 4th of Barcaldine
- Ket Cameron, married to John Campbell of Achalader
- Una Cameron, married her cousin Robert Barclay of Ury (1732–1797)
- Marjory Cameron, married Allan Roy MacDonald, 7th of Morar

One of his notable descendants is David Cameron, former British prime minister.

== In literature ==
- In the final stanza of the Child Ballad The Bonnie House of Airlie Ewen Cameron and Charles I vow to avenge the 1640 attack by Archibald Campbell, on Airlie Castle and the family of fellow Royalist leader James Ogilvy, 1st Earl of Airlie.
- The Lady of the Lake (canto v.), by Sir Walter Scott models the legendary fight of Lochiel and the roundhead for the fight scene between Roderick Dhu and FitzJames.
- Tales of a Grandfather, by Sir Walter Scott reproduced the apparent senility of Lochiel, who according to Thomas Pennant, "outlived himself, becoming a second child and even rocked in a cradle", juxtaposing this state with the great warrior of his youth.
- The Grameid, an epic poem in Latin on the Claverhouse campaign of 1689 features Lochiel, written by James Philip of Almerieclos.
- The Jacobite Trilogy, a series of historical novels by D.K. Broster which focuses on the Cameron role in the 1745 rising.

== Bibliography ==
- Drummond, John (1842). Memoirs of Sir Ewen Cameron of Locheill. Edinburgh: Bannatyne Club.
- Furgol, Edward M. "Cameron, Sir Ewen, of Lochiel (1629–1719)". Oxford Dictionary of National Biography (online ed.). Oxford University Press. doi:10.1093/ref:odnb/4440. (Subscription, Wikipedia Library access or UK public library membership required.)
- Henderson, Thomas Finlayson (1886). "Cameron, Ewen" . In Stephen, Leslie (ed.). Dictionary of National Biography. Vol. 8. London: Smith, Elder & Co.
- Macaulay, Thomas Babington (1856). The History of England from Accession of James II. Harper & Brothers.
- MacKenzie, Alexander (2008). "The History of the Camerons". The Celtic Magazine. Vol. 9, no. 97. ISBN 978-0-559-79382-0. Modern reprint of November 1883 article with a detailed account of Sir Ewen's life from 1654 to 1665.
- Stewart of Ardvorlich, John (1974). The Camerons: A History of Clan Cameron. Edinburgh: Clan Cameron Association. ISBN 978-0950555102.
