= Allan Cameron of Lochiel =

Allan Cameron of Lochiel (c. 1567–1647) was a Scottish clan chief and soldier. He fought at the Battle of Glenlivet in 1594. During the Scottish Civil War, he fought with the Marquis of Montrose and led his clan at the Battle of Inverlochy in 1645, aged nigh on 80. He was the 16th Chief of Clan Cameron.

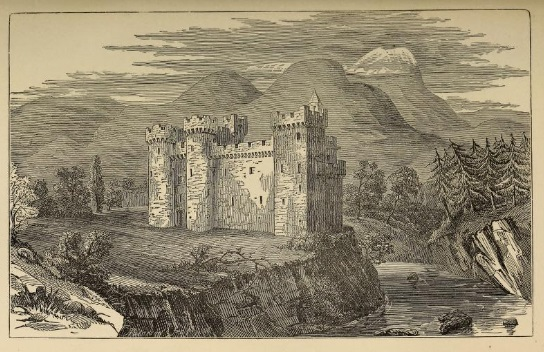
Torcastle, Lochaber; according to legend, this was the ancient seat of Banquo

Allan Cameron was the only son of John Cameron, son of Donald Cameron, son of Ewen Mor Cameron of Lochiel, XIII Chief. His father was murdered in 1569, and so he was raised by an aunt.

He married the daughter of Stewart of Appin. His eldest son John Cameron, Master of Lochiel died in 1635, imprisoned at Edinburgh. His second son Donald was the first laird of Glendessary, and thus progenitor of the Glendessary branch of Clan Cameron.

Lochiel was succeeded by his grandson Sir Ewen Cameron of Lochiel (1629–1729), who greatly increased the clan's fortunes and was a strong supporter of the Stuart monarchs.

== See also ==
- Chiefs of Clan Cameron
