= Spean Bridge =

Village in Kilmonivaig, Lochaber, Scotland

Coordinates: 56.895695°N 4.9151340°W

Spean Bridge: Scottish Gaelic: Drochaid an Aonachain
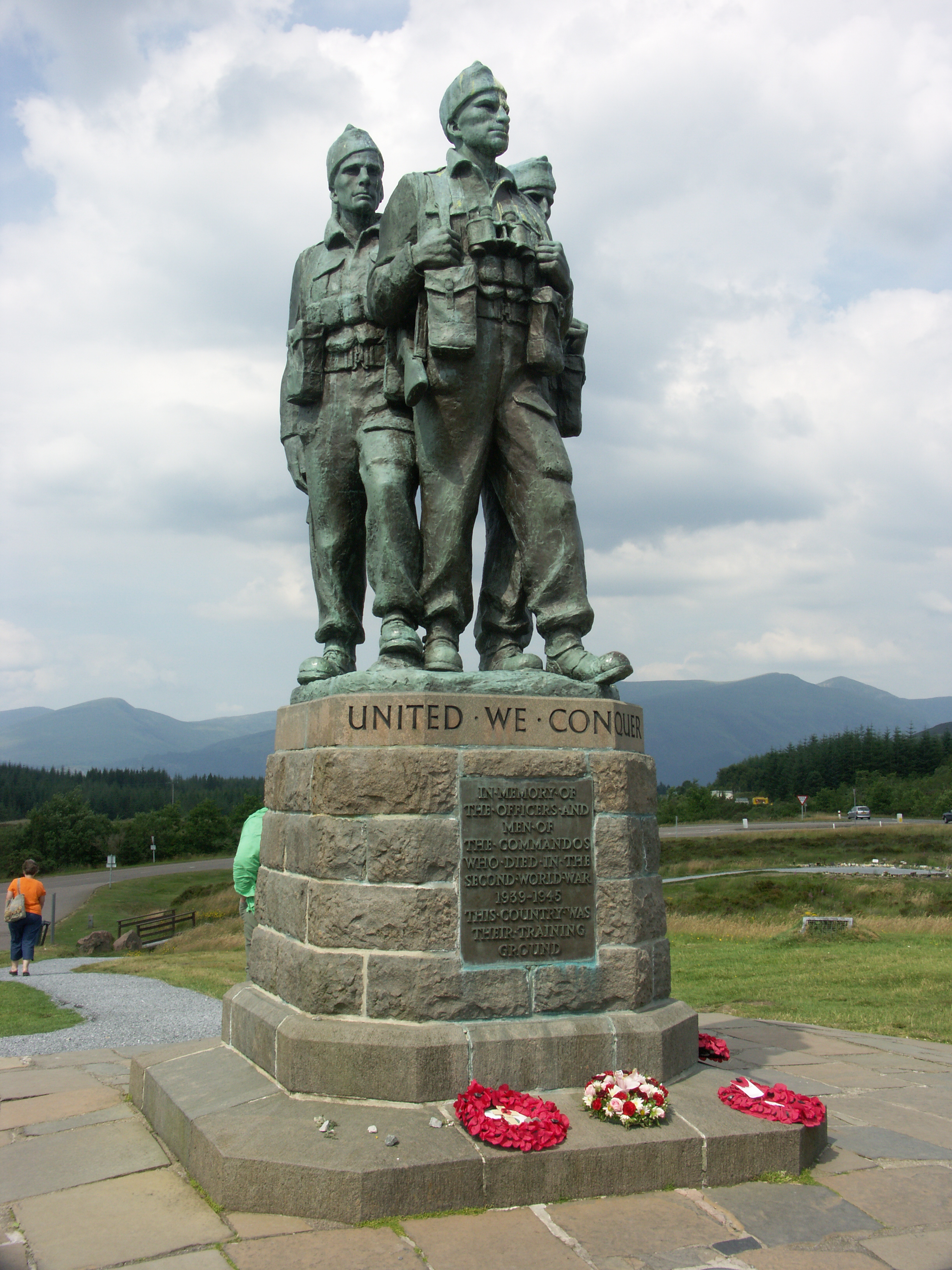
- Commando Memorial

- Location within the Highland council area
- Population: 550 (2020)
- OS grid reference: NN 22541 82045
  - Edinburgh: 93 mi (150 km)
  - London: 419 mi (674 km)
- Council area: Highland
- Country: Scotland
- Sovereign state: United Kingdom
- Post town: SPEAN BRIDGE
- Postcode district: PH34
- Dialling code: 01397
- UK Parliament: Ross, Skye and Lochaber
- Scottish Parliament: Skye, Lochaber and Badenoch

Spean Bridge (Scottish Gaelic: Drochaid an Aonachain) is a village in the parish of Kilmonivaig, in Lochaber in the Highland region of Scotland.

The village takes its name from the Highbridge over the River Spean on General Wade's military road between Fort William and Fort Augustus, and not from Thomas Telford's bridge of 1819 which carries the A82 over the river at the heart of the village.

The Highbridge Skirmish on 16 August 1745 was the first engagement of the Jacobite Rising of 1745.

The Commando Memorial, dedicated to the men of the original British Commandos raised during Second World War, is located approximately 1 mile (1.6 km) north-west of Spean Bridge, at the junction of the A82 and the B8004. It overlooks the training areas of the Commando Basic Training Centre established in March 1942 at Achnacarry Castle.

== Transport ==
Lying in the Great Glen, Spean Bridge has road links north towards Inverness and south to Fort William, provided by the A82, and the A86 heads east to join the A9 at Kingussie. The village is served also served by Spean Bridge railway station providing links to Glasgow, London, and Mallaig. Between 1903 and 1933 it offered a branch line service to Fort Augustus.

== Sport ==
Lochaber Camanachd is the shinty club based in the village of Spean Bridge.
