= Battle of Tullich =

Part of Glencairn's Rising (1654)

Coordinates: 57.0597°N 3.0454°W

- Part of Glencairn's rising
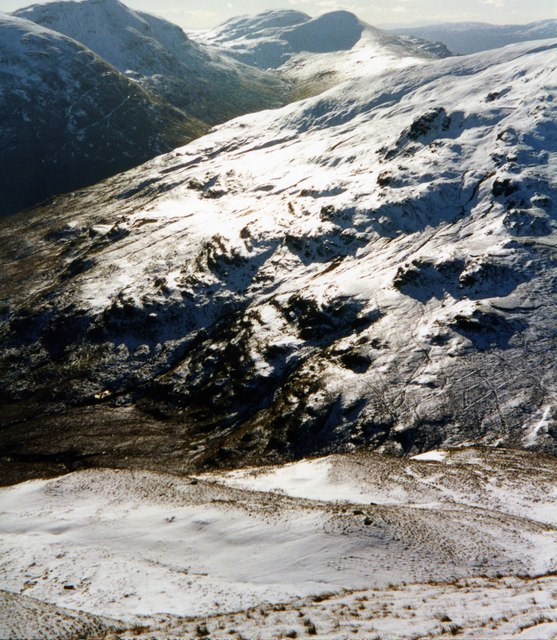
- Tullich Hill
Date	10 February 1654
Location	Tullich, Scotland
Result	Indecisive

Belligerents
The Protectorate	Royalists

Commanders and leaders
Robert Lilburne	Earl of Glencairn; Cameron of Lochiel

Strength
2,000–3,000 men	700 men

Casualties and losses
Heavy	Unknown
- Scotland

The Battle of Tullich, also known as the Battle of the Pass near Tullich, occurred on 10 February 1654 in Tullich, Scotland during Glencairn's rising. A Royalist force led by Ewen Cameron of Lochiel, under command of Glencairn, repulsed an attack by the numerically superior Commonwealth forces of Robert Lilburne.

== Prelude ==
After the English Commonwealth defeated King Charles II of England and his Scottish allies at the Battle of Worcester in September 1651, the Parliament of England moved to bring Scotland into the Commonwealth. In Scotland, there was significant resistance to being governed by the Commonwealth, particularly in the Highlands where there remained considerable support for the exiled King.

In early 1653, King Charles made William Cunningham, 9th Earl of Glencairn the temporary commander of Royalist forces in Scotland until Major-General John Middleton could arrive from the Dutch Republic. As the commander of the Scottish Royalists, Glencairn worked to build support among clan leaders in the Scottish Highlands and organized a guerrilla campaign against the Commonwealth.

== Battle ==
Supporting Glencairn in the campaign against the Commonwealth was Ewen Cameron of Lochiel, the Scottish Highland chief of the Clan Cameron. At that time, Glencairn was in the Eastern Highlands campaigning against Commonwealth occupational troops. Ewen and his clansmen were encamped at Tullich protecting Glencairn’s army against a surprise attack by Commonwealth forces.

During this time, a Commonwealth army commanded by General Robert Lilburne was in pursuit of Glencairn and found their way to Tullich. When the Commonwealth troops approached, Ewen sent a warning to Glencairn and prepared to defend the pass. The fighting started shortly thereafter and the Cameron clansmen stopped the Commonwealth advance, fending off several attacks. As the battle continued, Lilburne's troops also attempted to flank the Royalists but failed.

After many hours of fighting and having inflicted heavy losses on the Commonwealth troops, Ewen was ordered to retreat, leaving the pass open. The Commonwealth army, however, were depleted and unable to continue their offensive in the harsh terrain. As the Commonwealth troops fell back and attempted to return to Inverness, the Royalists went on the offensive, taking advantage of the situation to pursue and harass them for several miles.

== Aftermath ==
Ewen returned in triumph to report back to Glencairn and was hailed as "The Deliverer of the Highland Army." Later, Ewen received a letter of praise for his courage in battle from Charles II. Ian Mitchell's book On the Trail of Queen Victoria in the Highland is dedicated "to the Unknown Soldiers of Cromwell's Republic who fell in the Battle of Tullich near Ballater in 1654, overcoming bands of Royalist bandits under Locheil. Will we see their like again?"
