= Nathalan =

Saint Nathalan or Nachlan (died 678), was a Christian priest, and later bishop, who was active in the district now known as Aberdeenshire, in Scotland. He is recognised as a saint in the Catholic and Eastern Orthodox Churches.

== Life ==
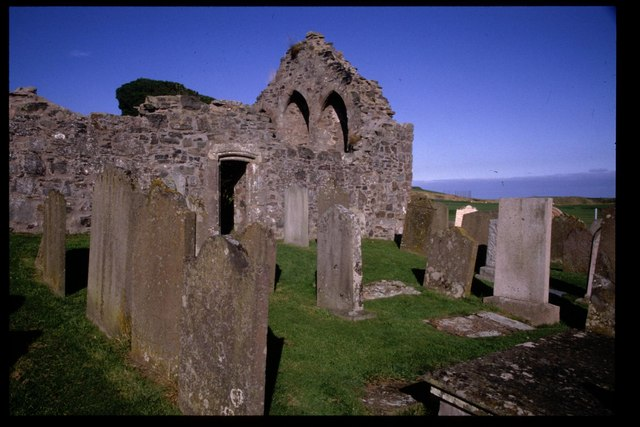
Cowie Kirk, originally dedicated to St Nathalan

Nathalan was born in the village of Tullich, for which he was eventually appointed bishop. The 16th-century Aberdeen Breviary portrays Nathalan as a rich nobleman who decided to cultivate the earth and devote himself to God as a hermit.

The earliest church in Tullich was founded by Nathalan in the 7th century. He also built churches at Bothelim and Colle. He was a nobleman who possessed a large estate, which he cultivated; he distributed his harvest generously to the poor.

Nathalan is reputed to have built the first small chapel on the windswept clifftop at Cowie, Aberdeenshire, sometime during the 7th century.

== Legend ==
According to legend one very rainy summer the saint, in a moment's weakness, cursed the rain which was hindering the harvest. In penitence for his great sin in cursing God's creation, Nathalan padlocked his right arm to his right leg, tossed the key into the River Dee and set off to walk to Rome to seek forgiveness. Upon reaching Rome he sat down to supper. However, when he cut open the fish laid before him he found the very key that he had thrown into the Dee many months previously. A pool in the river nearby is still known as "the key pool" for this reason.

== Legacy ==
St Nathalan Roman Catholic Church, Ballater is named for him. One of the stained glass windows in the baptistery of the Church of St James the Great in Stonehaven honours St Nathalan.

Ballater's Masonic Lodge, founded in May 1815, is named "The Lodge of St Nathalan of Tullich-in-Mar" and is number 259 on the roll of the Grand Lodge of Scotland.

Nathalan is one of the saints depicted in the Millennium Murals at St Mary's Cathedral, Aberdeen.

== See also ==
- Chapel of St Mary and St Nathalan at Cowie
