= Tullich =

Coordinates: 57°3′50″N 3°0′21″W

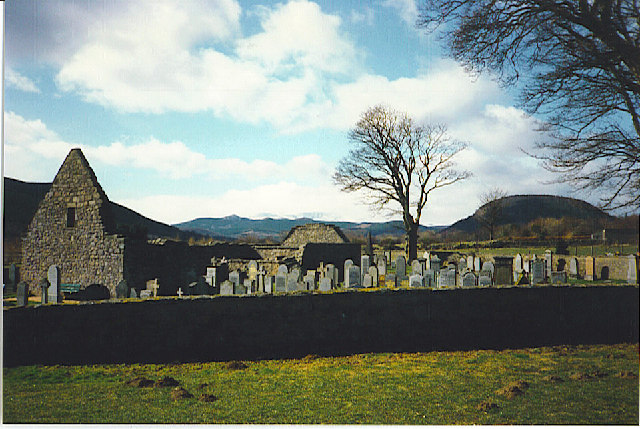
Tullich Kirk in 1994

Tullich (/ˈtʌlɪx/, Scottish Gaelic: An Tulach) is a village in Aberdeenshire, Scotland. It is known as the birthplace of St. Nathalan and also as the site of some noted Pictish stones.

The church is the site of a ruined church, built in around 1400. It has been suggested that the medieval church was constructed on the same site as a 7th-century chapel established by Nathalan.

== See also ==
- Battle of Tullich (1654)
