= Tor Castle =

Castle in Highland, Scotland, UK

Coordinates: 56.8609°N 5.0651°W

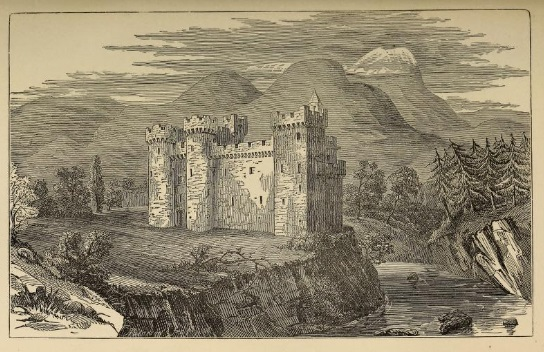
Engraving of Tor Castle, as found in Invernessiana: Contributions toward A History of the Town and Parish of Inverness, from 1160 to 1599 by Charles Fraser-Mackintosh, published in 1875

Tor Castle is a ruined castle, about 3 miles (5 kilometres) north east of Fort William, Highland, Scotland, west of the River Lochy and east of the Caledonian Canal, near Torlundy.

== History ==
An Iron Age fort previously occupied the site. According to tradition, the fort once belonged to Banquo, the Thane of Lochaber, who features in the play Macbeth. The Ordnance Survey Name Books of Kilmallie in 1872 makes an interesting comment of the site:

"The old Castle of Tor-Castle is by the natives of the place Tigh Bhanco i.e. ‘Banquo’s house’. There is a walk by the Lochyside to the North of Tor Castle known as Sràid Bhanco, i.e. ‘Banquo’s Walk’; and the small green field close by the Castle is called Dail a’ Chait i.e. ‘The field of the Cats’ where Banquo is said to have gone through a mode of ‘Divination’ by means of placing a cat on an iron spit & torturing the Taing of the Cats’ – a powerful spirit, who came forward, and on condition of getting his subject released revealed the future to the questioner."

The site was erroneously styled ‘Togarma’ by Sir Walter Scott in a note to the Lady of the Lake. The correct designation is Tigh-ghairm nan Cat; i.e. ‘The House of Invocation of the Cats.

There has been a castle at the site since at least the eleventh century. Donald B. MacCulloch (1939) writes in his book, Romantic Lochaber, that Tor Castle was built on top of an earlier site in the 11th century by Gillicattan Mor, early chief of Clan Chattan. By 1291 a splendid match was arranged for Angus Mackintosh, chief of the Clan Mackintosh, when he married Eva, the only daughter of Dougal Dal, 6th chief of the Clan Chattan, which brought Angus the lands of Glen Loy and Loch Arkaig. Angus and Eva lived on the lands of Clan Chattan at Tor Castle but they later withdrew to Rothiemurchus. The reason for the withdrawal was apparently a dispute with Aonghus Óg of Islay, chief of Clan Donald, who was Angus's maternal uncle.

MacCulloch (1939) then writes that the lands around Tor Castle were given by John, the 1st Lord of the Isles, to Alastair Carrach (1380–1440), progenitor of the Keppoch branch of the Macdonalds, who built an early keep. Alastair Carrach later was given Lordship of the Isles and the Camerons, as his vassals at the time, did not object to Alastair residing there. During the Battle of Inverlochy, Alastair gathered forces and launched an attack with Donald Balloch against King James I forces.

This battle also changed the allegiances of Clan Cameron and Clan Chattan, who were now loyal to the King instead of the Lord of the Isles. The castle was then seized by Clan Cameron, who built a massive tower house and courtyard. The Camerons initially used the castle as a refuge from attacks by the Clan MacDonald of Keppoch. A feud therefore arose as Clan Cameron considered the lands and castle abandoned by Clan Mackintosh/Chattan. By 1528, the old Clan Chattan lands at Lochaber were legally ceded to the Camerons, in a land charter by King James V. Ewen Mor Cameron of Lochiel, 13th chief of Clan Cameron rebuilt the castle in 1530. By 1665, Scotland's Privy Council ordered the chiefs of Cameron and Mackintosh to appear before them and finally resolve the dispute and make both of them bound by its decision. The Council ordered Cameron to pay Mackintosh 72,000 merks. Mackintosh did not appear satisfied with this outcome and was arrested and bound to keep the peace. As soon as he was released, he called on the Chattan Confederation to launch an expedition into Lochaber. See Stand-off at the Fords of Arkaig. After the stand off, the Cameron Chief crossed the river to meet his former enemy at the House of Clunes and to sign a contract for the formal sale of Loch Arkaig and Glen Loy, with Cameron and six friends paying in three instalments over two years. The Camerons considered it something of a Pyrrhic victory, as the pursuit of their claim to Glen Loy and Arkaig over the years had cost them lands worth four times as much. Cameron had problems raising the money, and was offered a loan by the Earl of Atholl in an attempt to curb the power of the Earl of Argyll, but Argyll offered a similar loan at lower interest. However, there were strings attached, Cameron had to pay £100 Scots in feu-duty and to acknowledge Argyll as superior of the lands. The Camerons were still paying rent to Argyll's factor in 1749. Tor Castle remained the seat of Clan Cameron until a new residence at Achnacarry was built after 1665. Tor Castle appears finally abandoned after the Jacobite rising of 1745.

== Structure ==
The castle consists of a very ruinous tower house.

The Royal Commission on the Ancient and Historical Monuments of Scotland (RCAHMS) site record of 1961 describes the site as "Tor Castle, a tower house in a rather poor condition, measuring internally 8.2 m by 4.9m, with walls standing to a maximum height of 4.0m and averaging 2.2m in thickness. It is constructed of mortared random rubble and shows some evidence of repair or rebuilding. On the north side of the tower are two fragments of old walling, probably the remains of a former barmkin, and the old scrapings and platforms of the earlier Tor Castle can still be traced. A deep ditch, now water filled, isolates the site from the remainder of the ridge on which it stands.” A archeology survey of 2015 describes the site as "Tor Castle (SM5471), survives predominantly as two prominent standing walls and a number of smaller sections of built wall, some of which are now turf covered."

== Legal Status ==
Tor Castle is listed with National Record of the Historic Environment as 23706 and registered as a Scheduled Monument (SM5471)
