= Highbridge Skirmish =

1745 skirmish

Coordinates: 56°53′41″N 4°57′25″W

- Part of the Jacobite rising of 1745
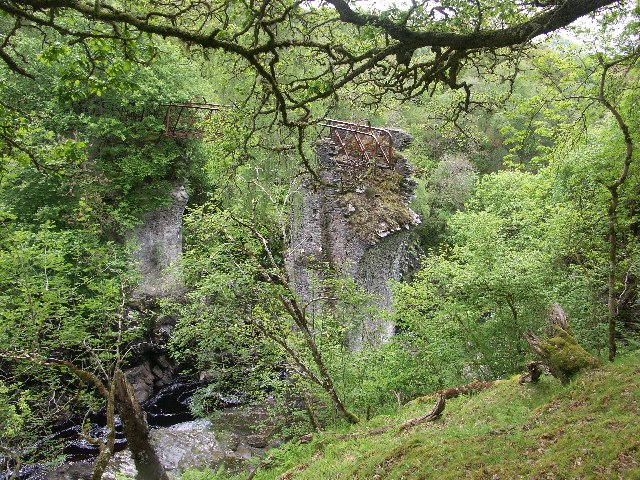
- The ruined remains of the bridge
Date	16 August 1745
Location	Highbridge, Scotland, Great Britain
Result	Jacobite victory

Belligerents
Jacobites	Great Britain

Commanders and leaders
Donald MacDonald	Captain Scott (surrendered)

Strength
13	85

Casualties and losses
None	2 killed 83 captured

The Highbridge Skirmish was the first engagement of the Jacobite rising of 1745 between government troops and Jacobites loyal to Prince Charles Edward Stuart. It took place at Highbridge, Lochaber, on the River Spean on 16 August 1745, and marked the commencement of hostilities between the two sides.

== Background ==
Shortly after Prince Charles had landed he met up firstly with the Donald Cameron of Lochiel and the Chief of the Clan MacDonald of Clan Ranald. As the Jacobites were amassing their forces the Governor of Fort Augustus despatched two companies of the Second Battalion of the Royal Scots regiment under the command of a Captain (later General) Scott. They were to reinforce the government garrison at Fort William. The government troops, some 85 men strong, marched along the road which had been built by the government to link the two forts directly. They met no resistance until they reached High Bridge over the River Spean. The bridge itself had been completed by General Wade less than ten years previously, as part of a network of military roads designed to facilitate troop movements across the Highlands.

== Commencement of hostilities ==
On the Bridge, Major Donald MacDonald of Tir nan dris with a mere 11 men and 1 piper, all of the Clan MacDonald of Keppoch, stood armed with swords and muskets, ready to meet the approaching enemy. It is said that by using the now demolished High Bridge Inn as cover, leaping and skipping about, moving from place to place, and extending their plaids between one another to give themselves a formidable appearance, the Jacobites deceived Captain Scott into thinking they were of a larger number. Captain Scott halted his men and sent forward a sergeant and servant to negotiate but both were taken prisoner. Scott then ordered his men to retreat and they began marching back the way they came. As they did so, they were fired on from both sides of the road. Captain Scott's men returned fire but he and his men were forced to change direction and move off the road.

Before this fire had been opened, bands of Jacobites were proceeding in the direction of the bridge to assist in the attack. Captain Scott continued his march rapidly along the side of Loch Lochy, and when he reached the east end, he observed some Jacobites on a hill at the west end of Loch Oich, where they had assembled apparently for the purpose of intercepting him on his retreat. Disliking the appearance of this body, which stood in the direct way of his retreat, Scott resolved to throw himself for protection into Invergarry Castle, the seat of the Clan MacDonell of Glengarry, and accordingly crossed the isthmus between the two lochs. This movement, however, only rendered his situation more embarrassing, as he had not marched far when he perceived another body of Jacobites, the Macdonells of Glengarry, coming down the opposite hill to attack him. In this dilemma he formed his men into a hollow square, and proceeded on his march. Meanwhile, MacDonald of Keppoch's men, headed by the chief, hastened the pursuit.

The Royal Scots eventually found themselves completely surrounded on all sides by the Clan MacDonald of Keppoch and the Clan MacDonnell of Glengarry. MacDonald of Keppoch advanced alone to Scott's party, required them to surrender, and offered them quarters; but assured them, that, in case of resistance, they would be cut to pieces. Fatigued with a long march, and surrounded on all sides by increasing bodies of Jacobites, Captain Scott, who had been wounded, and with two of his men killed, accepted the terms offered, and surrendered. Soon after Donald Cameron of Lochiel arrived and took charge of the prisoners, whom he carried to his own house at Achnacarry. It is said that the Jacobites did not lose a man.

== Aftermath ==
Later that day, Tir nan dris presented Captain Scott's captured grey gelding to Prince Charles at the raising of his standard at Glenfinnan. This incident marked the commencement of the 1745 Jacobite uprising against the Hanoverian crown.

The High Bridge itself was superseded by a later bridge in 1819, and collapsed in 1913.

== See also ==
- Jacobitism
- Highbridge, Scotland
