= Stand-off at the Fords of Arkaig =

Week long stalemate

Coordinates: 56°57′5″N 5°0′5″W

Stand-off at the Ford of Arkaig
- Part of the Scottish clan wars
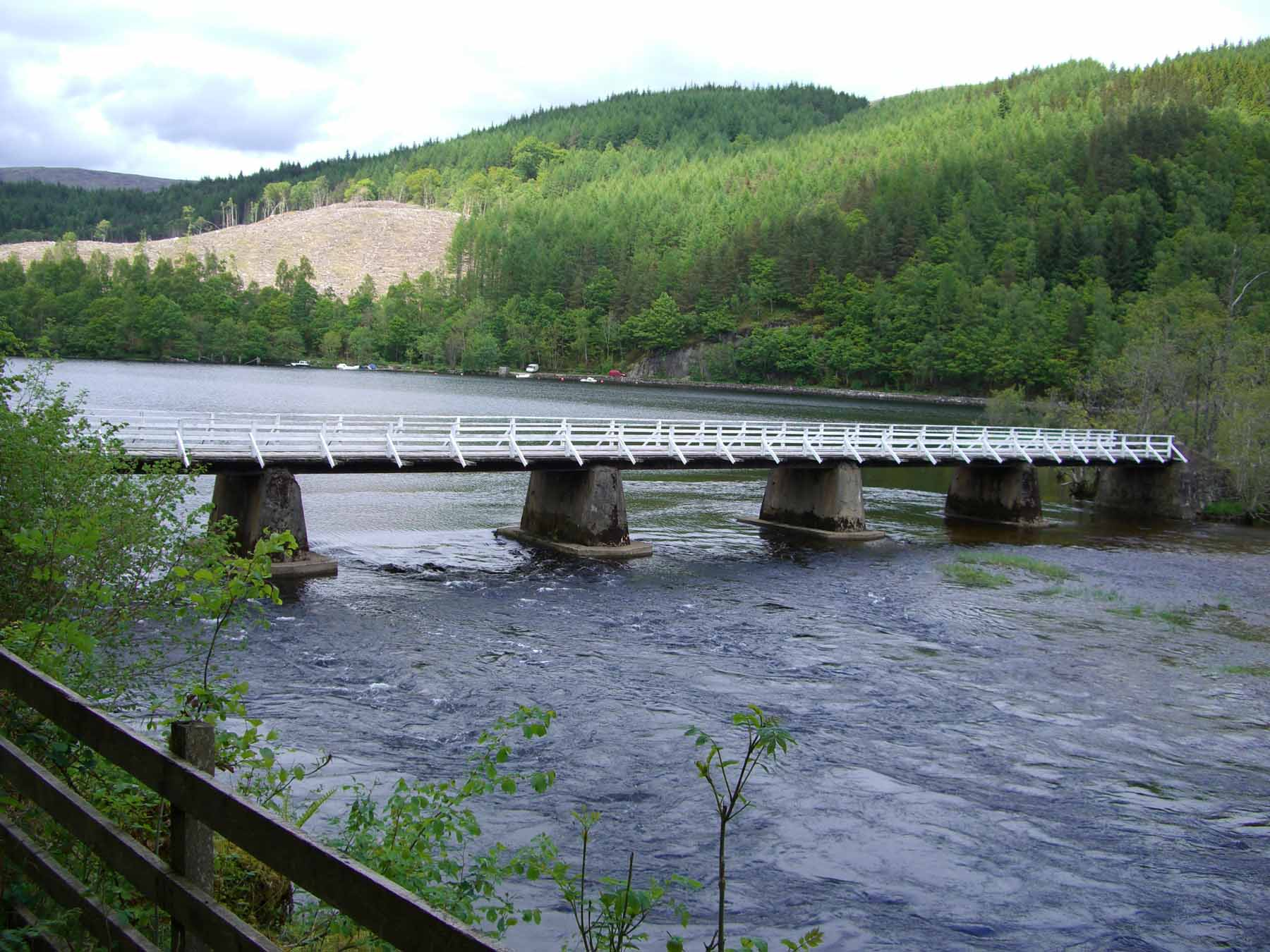
- Mackintosh marched on the north bank past the outflow of Loch Arkaig into the River Arkaig. There was no bridge then.
Date	13–20 September 1665
Location	Achnacarry, Scotland grid reference NN171884
Result	No battle (Cameron's halt Mackintosh advance)

Belligerents
Chattan Confederation	Clan Cameron

Commanders and leaders
Lachlan Mackintosh	Ewen Cameron

Strength
1,500	1,200

Casualties and losses
None	None

The Stand-off at the Ford of Arkaig occurred in September 1665 at Achnacarry, about 10 miles (16 km) northeast of Fort William, Scotland. The Chattan Confederation led by the Clan Mackintosh assembled an army to challenge Clan Cameron in a 360-year-old dispute over the lands around Loch Arkaig. After a week of stalemate, the long-running feud was ended by a deal in which the Camerons bought the land from the Mackintoshes.

== Background ==
=== 14th century ===
The Camerons and Mackintoshes had disputed the ownership of lands around Loch Arkaig and in Glen Loy to the south since the beginning of the 14th century. According to Mackintosh tradition, before 1291 the land had belonged to Dougal Dall MacGilleCattan, chief of the ancient Clan Chattan. In that year, his daughter Eva married Angus Mackintosh, 6th chief of Clan Mackintosh, uniting the two clans in the Chattan Confederation. Angus and Eva lived in Glen Loy for a few years before Angus had to flee from the Lord of Islay, into exile in Badenoch. The Camerons then occupied the lands, provoking about 360 years of feuding over the area. The clans fought their first battle, the Battle of Drumlui, in either 1330 or 1337. William Mackintosh, the son of Angus and Eva, had his right to the lands confirmed by charters from John of Islay, Lord of the Isles in 1337 and from King David II in February 1359. These charters and the marriage formed the basis of the Mackintosh claim on the lands, even though they were occupied by the Camerons for many years.

=== 1660s ===
Lachlan Mackintosh of Torcastle became chief of Clan Mackintosh in 1660, and immediately pursued his clan's ancient claim to the land. In 1661 he obtained a decree from Parliament assigning the lands to him, whilst Ewen Cameron of Lochiel was at Court pushing his claims to Ardnamurchan and the area around Loch Sunnart on the West Coast. In a letter dated 7 June 1661 the Lord Chancellor of Scotland, Lord Glencairn, wrote from London to the "Lord President and Lords of Session" in Edinburgh telling them to freeze Mackintosh's action until they heard again from the King, as he had a scheme to resolve the problem and reward Cameron for his loyalty (Glencairn and Cameron had played large parts in the Royalist rising of 1651 to 1654). No more was heard from the Court, so in July 1662 Mackintosh obtained a Decree of Removal against the Camerons in the area. Cameron sought an audience with the King, pointing out that the Camerons would not leave their ancient lands peaceably. The King was unwilling to interfere directly in the affairs of Parliament, so a letter was written on his behalf to the Earl of Middleton, another veteran of the uprising and now Lord High Commissioner to the Parliament of Scotland. This letter, dated 30 May 1662, urged Middleton to find a peaceful resolution. Meanwhile, a warrant had been issued for Cameron's arrest, but he persuaded the Privy Council to defer it for a few weeks, allowing him to return home to Lochaber.

Later that summer Mackintosh petitioned for a Commission of fire and sword against Cameron, unsuccessfully at first but in 1663 he had the whole of Clan Cameron declared outlaws. The commission against Cameron authorised various noblemen to implement it, but when approached by Mackintosh, they all told him to accept the financial compensation that had already been offered to him by Cameron. So Mackintosh decided to take matters into his own hands and having failed to induce his neighbours to join him, resorted to bribery to get them on his side. Meanwhile, in January 1665, the Duke of Rothes, Lord Chancellor of Scotland, ordered the Commission of Fire and Sword into abeyance until the Privy Council had decided what to do.

Both Cameron and Mackintosh appeared before the Privy Council and agreed to be bound by its decision. Initially the Council told them to agree a sum of compensation between themselves, but when this proved impossible, the Council ordered Cameron to pay Mackintosh 72,000 merks (about £3600 in English money of the time). Mackintosh tried to leave Edinburgh in secret, but was arrested and bound to keep the peace. However, as soon as he got home, he called on the Chattan Confederation to launch an expedition into Lochaber. Some of his friends tried to dissuade him, but Mackintosh ignored them and led 1500 men to the south end of Loch Lochy. Cameron assembled a force from his own clan joined by MacGregor men, a clan that had served Glencairn in 1653-4, and a small party of MacIans of Glencoe. They numbered 300 bowmen, plus 900 men armed with guns, broadswords and targe shields. They then marched for Cameron's home at Achnacarry, which is in a strategic position on the south bank of the River Arkaig, on the isthmus between Loch Arkaig and Loch Lochy.

== Stand-off ==
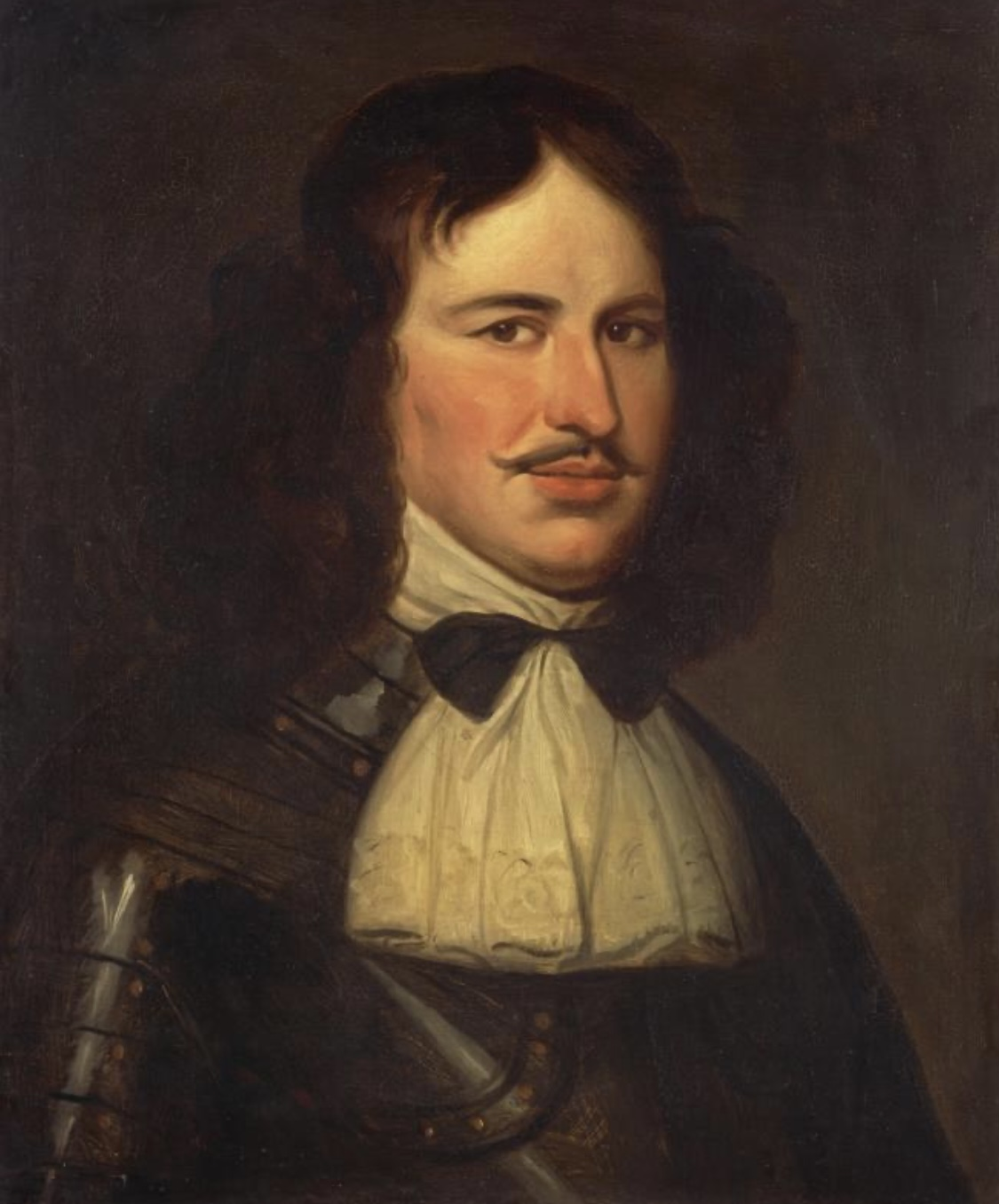
Ewen Cameron of Lochiel: the famed portrait now kept at Achnacarry House

On 16 September 1665, Mackintosh marched through the wood of Glastermore to Clunes before taking up position in what is now known as Caig Parks north of the River Arkaig. Cameron's men withdrew across the river to Achnacarry, securing the only ford on the river. For two days the armies faced each other across the river. Having no boats, Mackintosh started to move his force up the side of Loch Arkaig, getting as far as Achnasaul. Cameron entrenched 50 men at the ford, and then moved the rest of his force west to face Mackintosh across the loch.

Meanwhile, the Earl of Argyll had sent 300 Campbells under John Campbell of Glen Orchy, later Earl of Breadalbane, with orders to end the dispute with force if necessary. He started negotiations with Mackintosh, who retreated east a little, setting camp opposite the island of Eilean Loch Airceig, but no agreement was found that day. On the 19th, a settlement was agreed by friends of the two parties, but Mackintosh refused to accept the terms, even when his men refused to fight for him. Mackintosh and his army marched back to Clunes. On the morning of the third day, he agreed to a deal in which he sold the land to the Camerons for 72,500 merks, and his friends paid the extra money he wanted themselves.

Meanwhile, Campbell had encountered a party of men under Cameron of Erracht, whom Cameron had sent across the loch by boat the night before. Cameron had started on a 18 miles (29 km) march with the rest of his men to the western end of Loch Arkaig and back down the north bank, to surprise the Mackintosh army from the west. En route Cameron met Campbell, who told him of Mackintosh's agreement. Cameron wanted to continue his march until Campbell threatened to join his men with the Mackintosh army and set all the forces of the Earl of Argyll against the Camerons.

== Aftermath ==
On the 20 September 1665, Cameron crossed the river to meet with his former enemy at the House of Clunes and to sign a contract for the sale of Loch Arkaig and Glen Loy, with Cameron and six friends paying in three instalments over two years. Along with 24 of their leading clansmen, the two chiefs saluted each other, drank together, and exchanged swords to mark the end of the feud. That afternoon Mackintosh marched in good order north from Clunes to Laggan.

Tradition had it that in more than three centuries, "a Mackintosh and a Cameron had never even spoken together", which of course ignored alliances such as that at the Battle of Inverlochy (1431). The Camerons considered it something of a Pyrrhic victory, as the pursuit of their claim to Arkaig and Glen Loy over the years had cost them lands worth four times as much. Cameron had problems raising the money, and was offered a loan by the Earl of Atholl in an attempt to curb the power of Argyll, but Argyll offered a similar loan at lower interest. However, there were strings attached, Cameron had to pay £100 Scots in feu-duty and to acknowledge Argyll as superior of the lands. The Camerons were still paying rent to Argyll's factor in 1749.

== See also ==
- Achnacarry Castle - the Cameron home, built ten years before the Stand-off
- Battle of Drumlui - the first battle between the clans

== Bibliography ==
- Mackenzie, Alexander (1883), "The History of the Camerons", The Celtic Magazine, vol. IX, BiblioBazaar 2008 reprint, pp. 147–156, ISBN 978-0-559-79382-0
- Mackintosh-Shaw, Alexander (1880), Historical Memoirs of the House and Clan of Mackintosh and of the Clan Chattan, R. Clay, sons, and Taylor
