= Achnacarry =

Hamlet, private estate, and a castle in Lochaber, Scotland

Coordinates: 56.945171°N 4.998183°W

Achnacarry: Scottish Gaelic: Achadh na Cairidh
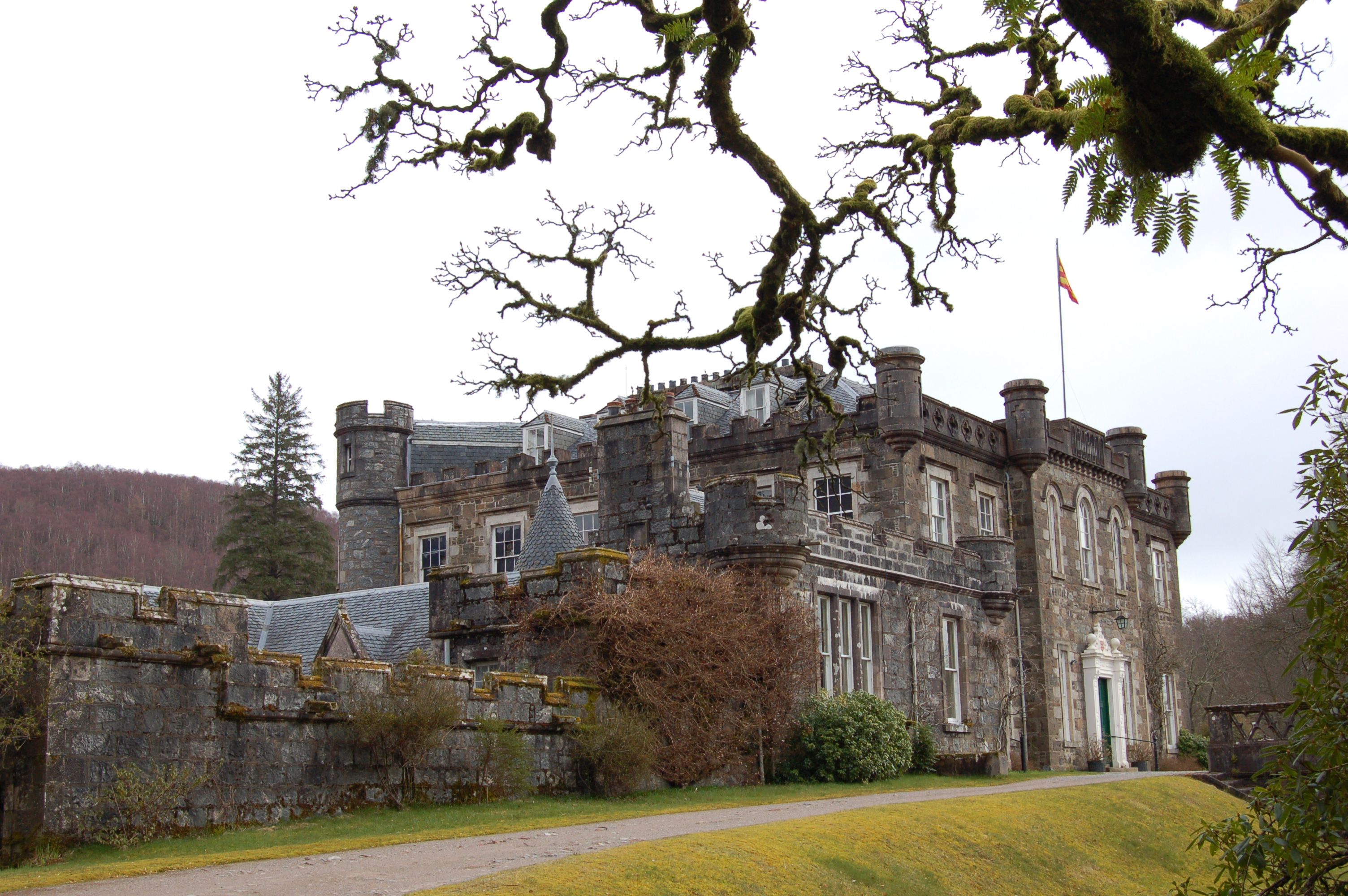
- Achnacarry Castle

- Location within the Lochaber area
- OS grid reference: NN176877
- Council area: Highland
- Country: Scotland
- Sovereign state: United Kingdom
- Post town: SPEAN BRIDGE
- Postcode district: PH34
- Police: Scotland
- Fire: Scottish
- Ambulance: Scottish
- UK Parliament: Inverness, Skye and West Ross-shire
- Scottish Parliament: Skye, Lochaber and Badenoch

Achnacarry (Scottish Gaelic: Achadh na Cairidh) is a hamlet, private estate, and a castle in the Lochaber region of the Highlands, Scotland. It occupies a strategic position on an isthmus between Loch Lochy to the east, and Loch Arkaig to the west.

Achnacarry has a long association with Clan Cameron: Sir Ewen Cameron of Lochiel built the original castle in 1655. This was destroyed by government troops led by the Duke of Cumberland after the Battle of Culloden. However, "New Achnacarry" was built near the same site in Scottish Baronial style in 1802. In the Second World War, it housed the Commando Basic Training Centre and the area retains close ties to British Commandos, the United States Army Rangers and similar units from other allied nations. In 1928 the Achnacarry Agreement was signed, an early attempt to set petroleum production quotas.

== Geography ==
Achnacarry is not far from the village of Spean Bridge and about 15 miles (24 km) north of the town of Fort William. It was described by Queen Victoria as follows:

"As you approach Achnacarry, which lies rather low, but is surrounded by very fine trees, the luxuriance of the tangled woods, surmounted by rugged hills, becomes finer and finer till you come to Loch Arkaig, a little over half a mile [800 meters] from the house. This is a very lovely loch, reminding one of Loch Katrine, especially where there is a little pier, from which we embarked on board a very small but nice screw steamer which belongs to Cameron of Lochiel."

— Royal Visit to Achnacarry, from the Journal of Queen Victoria, Friday, 12 September 1873

Between Achnacarry Castle and Loch Arkaig is a path of interwoven trees known as The Dark Mile, or Mìle Dorcha in Gaelic.

== History ==
=== Original castle ===
Ewen "Eoghainn MacAilein" Cameron, XIII Chief of Clan Cameron, enlarged the highly disputed Tor Castle (said to have been on Clan Mackintosh lands) in the early 16th century. Tor Castle would remain the seat of the Camerons of Lochiel until demolished by his great-great-great-grandson, Sir Ewen "Dubh" Cameron, XVII Chief.

Sir Ewen Cameron wanted a "more convenient" house, which was further removed from the Clan Mackintosh, Clan Campbell, and Oliver Cromwell's garrison at Inverlochy Castle. Around 1655, he built Achnacarry Castle in a strategic position on the isthmus between Loch Lochy and Loch Arkaig. One of the few remaining descriptions relates that Lochiel's seat was: "...a large house, all built of fir planks, the handsomest of that kind in Britain." Around 1663, Sir Ewen's bard described the home in song as: "The generous house of feasting...Pillared hall of princes...Where wine goes round freely in gleaming glasses...Music resounding under its rafters." Others portrayed "old" Achnacarry as a "man's home", with the feel and look of a grand hunting lodge amidst the West Highlands.

In 1665, the Stand-off at the Fords of Arkaig took place near Achnacarry, after which the Camerons finally ended their 360-year feud with the Chattan Confederation led by the Clan Mackintosh.

With Sir Ewen's death in the early 18th century, his son John Cameron became Clan Chief, soon after which his son, Donald would assume Achnacarry when Lord Lochiel (as his father was known) fled into exile in Flanders after the first Jacobite Uprising.

From Donald Cameron ("The Gentle Lochiel") XIX Chief we find the best description of the grounds of Achnacarry. In his marriage contract, a requirement was placed in which Lochiel had to build his wife: "...a house...to the value of 100 pounds sterling at least, with gardens, office houses [privies], lands, other conveniencys." Donald was planting a long line of beech trees near the banks of the River Arkaig when word of "Bonnie Prince Charlie's" landing arrived in 1745; it would be the last landscaping done at Achnacarry Castle for years to come.

With the Jacobite army's defeat at the Battle of Culloden the clans retreated into the Scottish Highlands, with Donald taking the lead in regrouping them. After this last attempt at resistance failed, he and his men took to the mountains. On 28 May 1746, Donald watched as men from Bligh's Regiment under the command of Lt-Col Edward Cornwallis and an Independent Company of Munros, commanded by George Munro, 1st of Culcairn, burned Achnacarry to the ground. Many valued relics and personal possessions were relocated beforehand, but the great fir-planked "Old" Achnacarry was left in ashes.

=== Current Achnacarry Castle ===
In 1802, Achnacarry, which had spent the last fifty or so years in ruin, was rebuilt under Donald Cameron, XXII Chief of Clan Cameron as a Scottish baronial style home, although this "New Achnacarry" is still referred to as a castle. His wife Anne née Abercromby engaged James Gillespie as architect.

In 1928, Achnacarry served as the meeting place for global petroleum producers in an effort to set production quotas. A document known as the Achnacarry Agreement or "As-Is" Agreement was signed on 17 September 1928.

==== Second World War ====
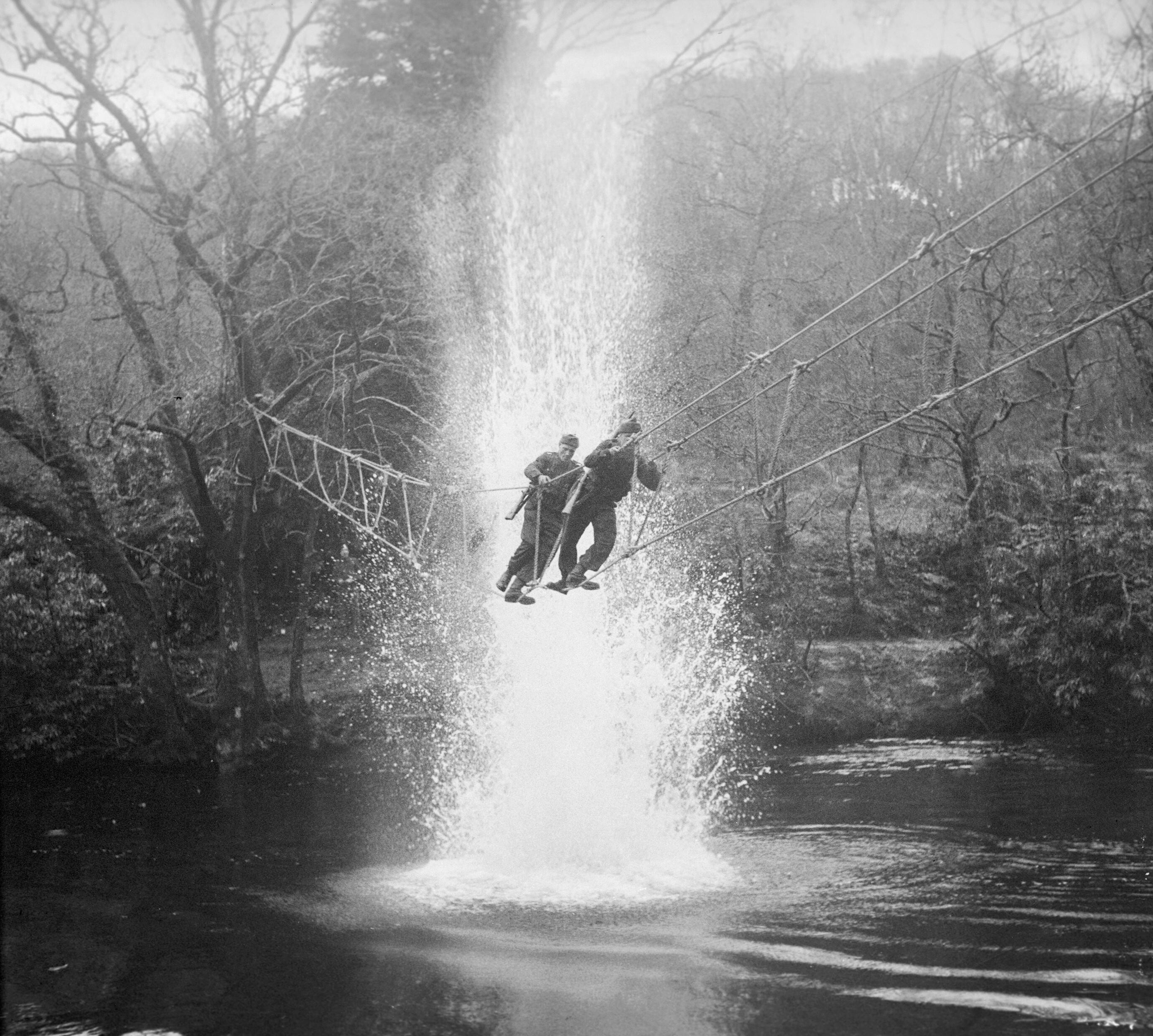
Commandos cross a river on a "toggle bridge" under simulated artillery fire (January 1943).

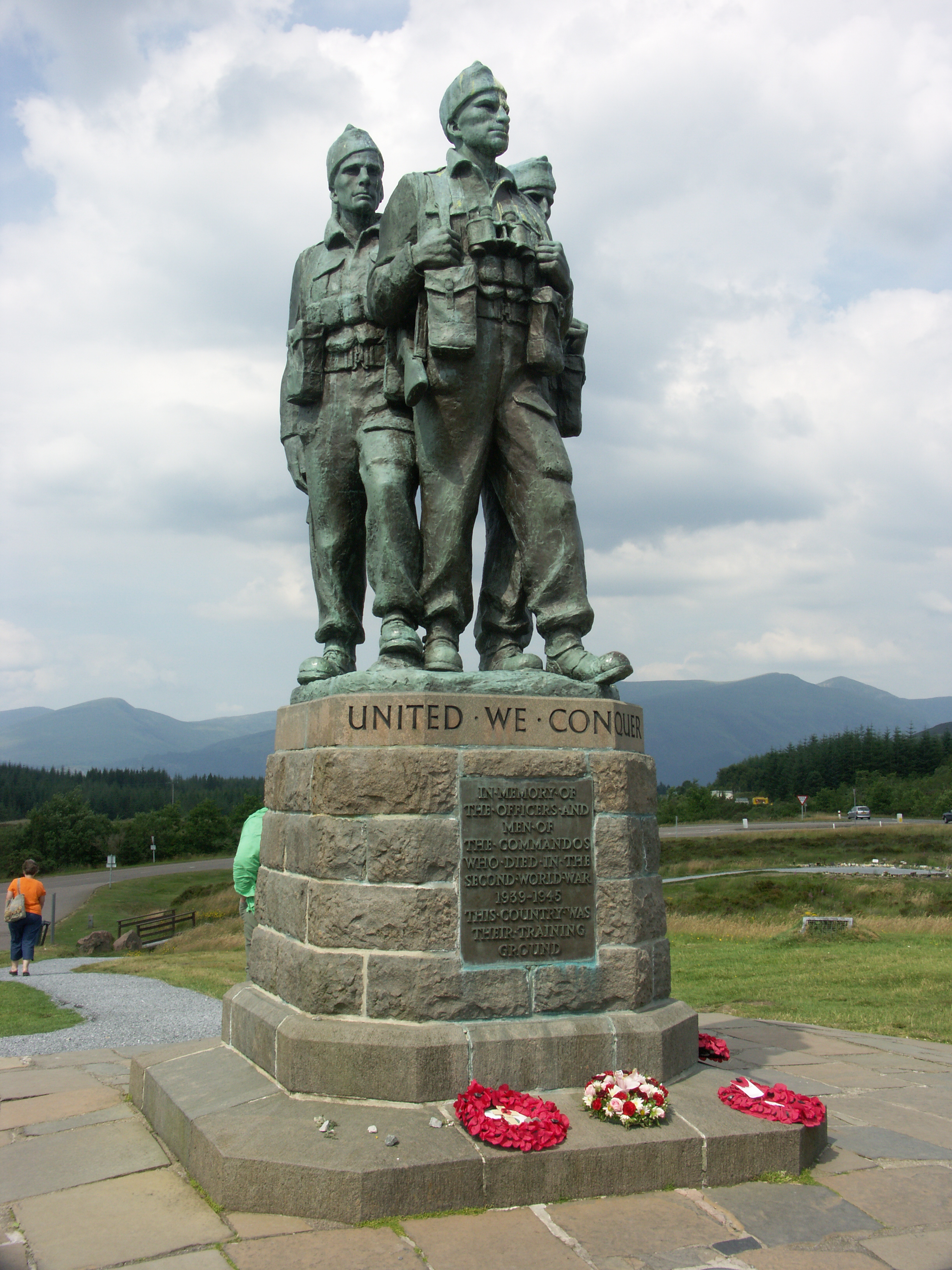
Commando Memorial.

The current building and the surrounding estate gained fame as the Commando Training Depot for the Allied Forces from March 1942 to 1945.

British Commandos, United States Army Rangers, and commandos from France, the Netherlands, Norway, Czechoslovakia, Poland, and Belgium trained there. Each training course culminated in an "opposed landing" exercise around the area of nearby Bunarkaig on Loch Lochy. As live ammunition was used, some casualties resulted from the training exercises at Achnacarry. Some 25,000 commandos completed training at the centre during the four years it was in use.

The castle also suffered some damage due to fire. Several military associations still sponsor a Commando march either annually or from time to time. Generally, it is a timed 7 mi (11 km) march, in full battle gear, backpack, and combat boots, from Spean Bridge (site of the striking Commando Memorial) to Achnacarry.

==== Post Second World War ====
In August 2001, Achnacarry served as the site of the International Gathering of Clan Cameron, commemorating the 50th anniversary of Colonel Sir Donald Hamish Cameron of Lochiel, K.T., XXVI Chief of Clan Cameron. It also hosted the International Gathering of Clan Cameron in the summer of 2009.

Although the castle itself is in private hands and is not open to the public, the commando memorial can be visited.

== Clan Cameron Museum ==
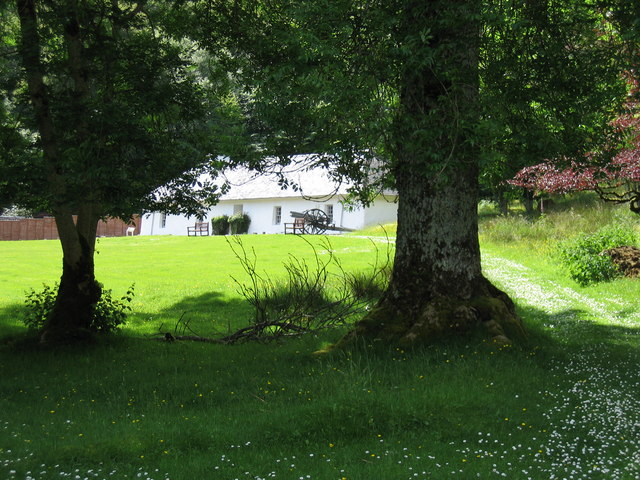
The Clan Cameron Museum at Achnacarry

A Clan Cameron Museum is about 1/4 mi (400 m) from the castle. The current Chief of Clan Cameron, traditionally known simply as "Lochiel", Donald Cameron of Lochiel, continues to live in Achnacarry. Displays in the museum include the clan's legends, chiefs, slogans, history, clan lands in Lochaber, and notable clansmen. Other exhibits include artefacts associated with the castle and estate's history, with the Queen's Own Cameron Highlanders, and with "Bonnie Prince Charlie".

== See also ==
- Chiefs of Clan Cameron
- Rutherford House, home of the first Premier of Alberta, Alexander Cameron Rutherford, from 1911 to 1941, which was originally called Achnacarry in honour of his family roots.
- Anglo-American Petroleum Agreement – a 1944 attempt to control petroleum production
