= Highbridge, Scotland =

Ruined bridge in Lochaber, Scotland

Highbridge
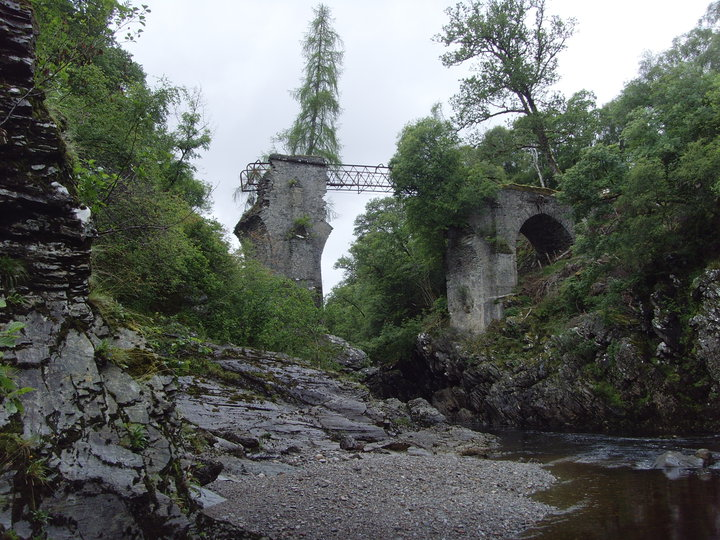
- The ruins of the bridge
- Coordinates: 56°53′41″N 4°57′25″W

History
- Designer: George Wade
- Built: 1736
- Collapsed: 1913

Listed Building – Category B
- Official name: By Spean Bridge, High Bridge Over River Spean
- Designated: 4 October 1971
- Reference no.: LB6841

Location
- Interactive map of Highbridge

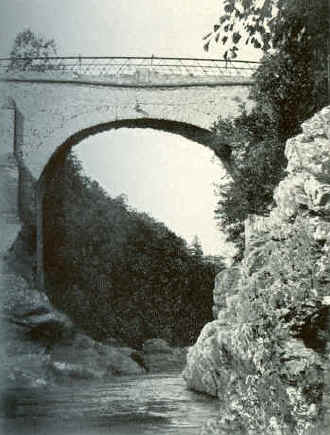
The bridge as it was in 1899

Highbridge is located on the River Spean, 2 kilometres (1.2 mi) downstream from the village of Spean Bridge in the Scottish Highlands. The village takes its name from this bridge.

The bridge was originally built by General Wade in 1736 (at a cost of £1,087) as the crossing of the River Spean on his Inverness to Fort William military road. This bridge was superseded in 1819 by a new bridge further upstream, designed by Thomas Telford. Highbridge was last repaired in 1893, but partially collapsed in 1913, and only the piers now remain. The remains are protected as a category B listed building.

It was the site of the first action of the Jacobite rising of 1745, the Highbridge Skirmish, when a small number of Keppoch MacDonalds fooled a company of troops led by Captain Scott into thinking the bridge was heavily defended. The government troops retreated and were pursued to Loch Oich, where they surrendered.

== See also ==
- List of bridges in Scotland
