= Scuttler (disambiguation) =

Scuttler or Scuttlers may refer to:

- Scuttlers, criminals in street gangs in 19th-century Manchester
- In scuttling of ships, those responsible
- In The Crack in Space by Philip K. Dick, a transport device
- In The Elder Scrolls Online, a non-sentient reptile
- Scuttlers (play), a 2015 play by Rona Munro

== See also ==
- Scuttle (disambiguation)
