= Bengal tiger (disambiguation) =

The Bengal tiger (Panthera tigris tigris) is a tiger subspecies.

Bengal tiger may also refer to:

== Film and television ==
- Bengal Tiger (1936 film), an American English-language film
- Bengal Tiger (2015 film), an Indian Telugu-language film
- The Bengal Tiger (Minder episode), an episode of the TV series Minder

== People ==
- Amichand Rajbansi (1942–2011), South African politician, nicknamed "The Bengal Tiger"
- Sourav Ganguly, Indian cricketer, nicknamed "Bengal Tiger"

== Other uses ==
- Canna 'Bengal Tiger', a cultivar of the canna plant
- Bengal Tiger or Bengal Tiger at the Baghdad Zoo, a stage production
- Scuttlers, members of youth gangs of late-Victorian England
- Tiger II, a German WW2 heavy tank nicknamed Königstiger (Bengal tiger)

== See also ==
- Bengal Tigers (disambiguation)
