= Regimental tartan =

Tartan pattern used by a military unit

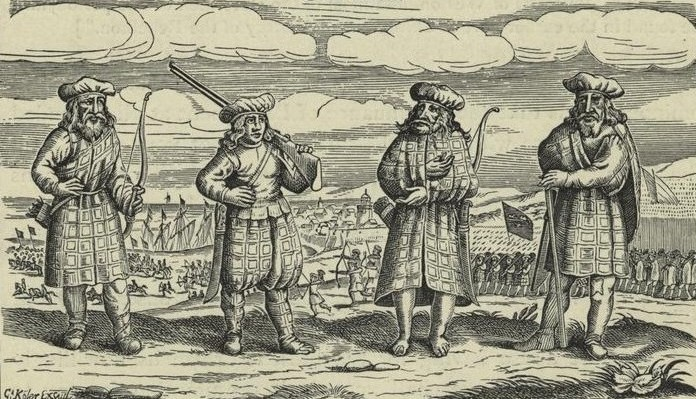
The earliest image of Scottish soldiers wearing tartan (belted plaids and trews); 1631 German engraving by Georg Köler. (Note: The Highlanders depicted were mistakenly described as Irish: "Irrländer oder Irren". The baggy trews seem to be an attempt at imitating a foreign fashion in native material.)

Regimental tartans are tartan patterns used in military uniforms, possibly originally by some militias of Scottish clans, certainly later by some of the Independent Highland Companies (IHCs) raised by the British government, then by the Highland regiments and many Lowland regiments of the British Army, and eventually by some military units in other countries. The earliest evidence suggesting militia uniform tartans dates to 1691, and the first certain uniform tartan was that of the Royal Company of Archers in 1713. The IHCs raised 1725–29 by the British government appear to have had one or more uniform tartans, though some later ones did not.

The first true Highland regiment of the British Army was the 42nd Regiment of Foot (Black Watch) formed by amalgamation of the IHCs in 1739, and had its own consistent uniform tartan (known as Black Watch, 42nd, or Government tartan) by 1749 or 1757 at the latest. Some later Highland units also wore this tartan, while others developed minor variations on it, usually by adding bright-coloured over-checks (thin lines). Some few regiments developed their own tartans not based on Black Watch, including the 75th, 79th, Fraser Fencibles, and Loyal Clan Donnachie Volunteers. Some units developed special tartans for bandsmen and grenadiers.

Regimental tartans, along with regional or "district" ones, led to the development of clan tartans in the late 18th to mid-19th century. After clan tartans were introduced, the flow of influence reversed, and many regiments adopted clan tartans into their uniforms in the 19th century. Since the 2006 amalgamation of the surviving Scottish regiments as battalions into the Royal Regiment of Scotland, only 10 tartans are now used for British units.

== Pre-regiment military use ==
Clans had for a long time independently raised militias to fight in their periodic internecine conflicts. Starting in 1603, the British government itself mustered irregular militia units in the Highlands, known as the Independent Highland Companies, to police and keep the peace in the region, also engaged in more prosaic duties like road-building and acting as guides for regular army units. In 1627, an Alexander MacNaughtan raised a tartan-dressed body of Highland archers to serve under the Earl of Morton for Charles I of England. The earliest image of Scottish soldiers in tartan is a 1631 copperplate engraving by Georg Köler (1600–1638); it features Highland mercenaries of the Thirty Years' War landing in the Baltic port of Stettin in 1630 or 1631, thought to be "Mackay's Regiment", the (non-governmental) militia of Donald Mackay, Lord Reay, who joined the forces of Gustavus Adolphus of Sweden. The men are depicted in varying dress, including belted plaid, shoulder plaid, and tartan trews with tartan hose; the tartan is illustrated rather crudely, and there is no way to know whether it was intended to represent a uniform. More independent companies were raised by the government in 1667; there is no surviving information on the tartans they wore.

In the 1691 Jacobite poem The Grameid, James Philip of Almerieclose described Highland troops at the 1689 Battle of Killiecrankie being distinguishable by a number of factors, including colours of hose, of coats, and of tartans. While it is not always clear when he was referring to the miliamen and when he was more specifically describing the bedecked lords who led them, and he did not use the term "regimental tartan", "clan tartan", or anything similar, he did in places appear to be describing uniforms, (Note: Philip was writing in Latin. Various later books have provided English renditions. Some key phrases: "Glengarry's men were in scarlet hose and plaids crossed with a purple stripe. Lochiel was in a coat of three colours; the plaid worn by MacNeil of Barra rivaled the rainbow." Another describes Glengarry's men as "three hundred ... each of whom a tartan garb covers, woven ... in triple stripe." Then it turns to individuals again: "the flowing plaid of yellow stripe covers the shoulders of both" Maclean of Duart and brother Alexander.) and D. W. Stewart (1893) interprets them as such. So does Scarlett (1990), who argues that it was both a matter of economy to produce a large quantity of the same cloth and a matter of commander pride to have troops in a uniform livery. Aside from the clan militias, however, a 1709 account by the Board of General Officers describes the independent companies as wearing Highland dress indistinguishable from that of civilians ("the better [to] discover any designs or machinations against the Government, or the country"), not uniforms.

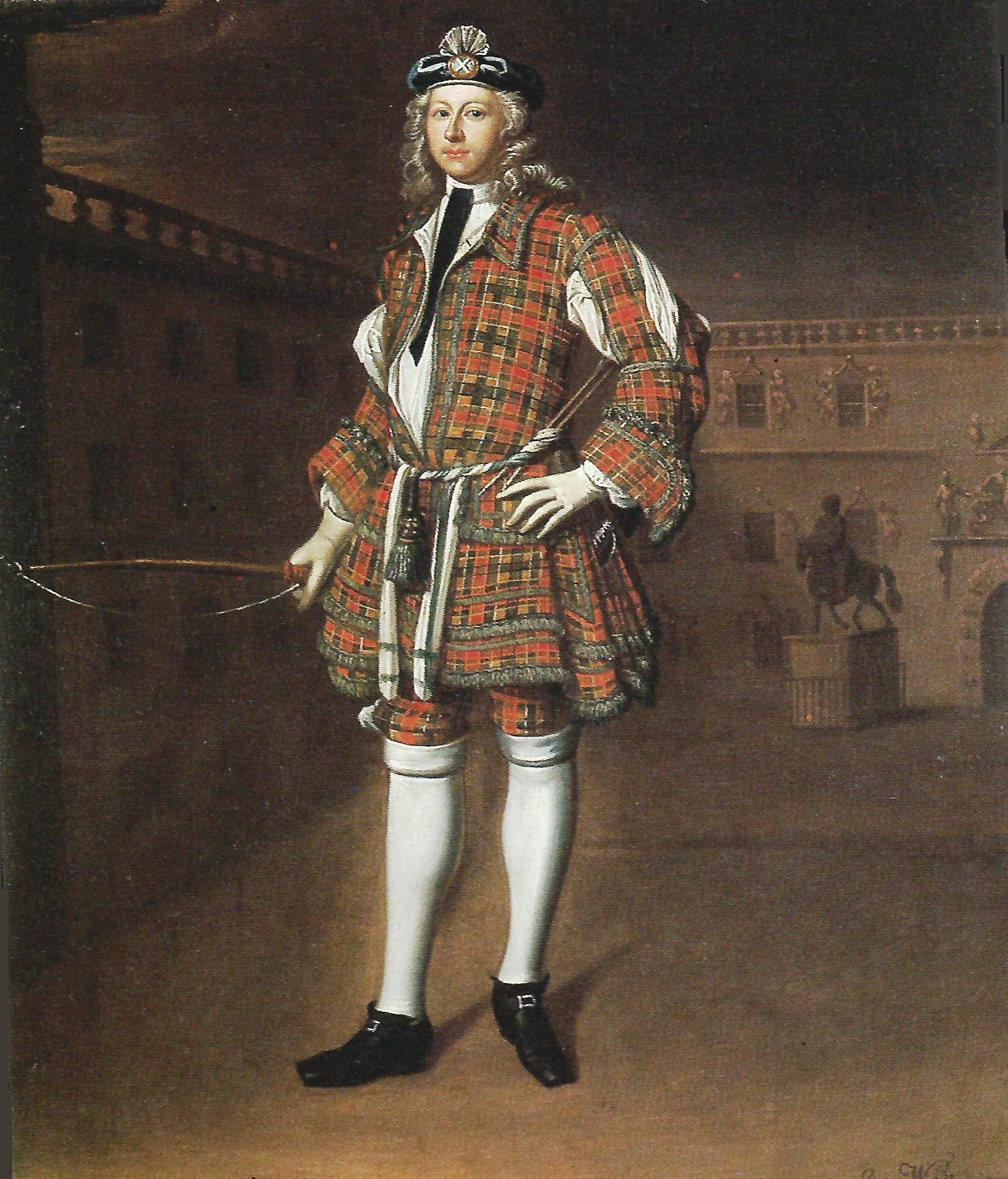
Royal Company of Archers uniform as worn by Archibald Grant of Monymusk, painted 1715 by Richard Waitt

In 1713, the Royal Company of Archers (first formed in 1676 as a private archery club, and later neither an independent company nor an army regiment, but a ceremonial company serving as royal bodyguards under a royal charter of 1704), became the first unit in service to the British crown who adopted a tartan as a part of their formal uniform. Their original red tartan, used for a dress-like tunic, coat, and matching short trews, was once unknown and subject to speculation; (Note: Competing claims that it was royal Stewart, Ogilvie, or Drummond of Strathallan sett have all proven incorrect.) It was quite complex, and period paintings (at least three, including one of the future George III) that attempt to illustrate it do not match. But from a few surviving examples of the uniform, in 2012 it was analysed in detail, in several variants (the original, a c. 1750 change that made it even more complex, and an 1850 simplified copy that was used to make a Victorian-era reconstruction of the outfit). The pattern appears to have influenced both the later Drummond of Strathallan and Ogilvie clan tartans. (In 1789, the company switched to new kit in Black Watch tartan, and ceased using tartan c. 1860–70.)

The chief of Clan Grant ordered in 1703 and again in 1704 that his "fencible" men, some 600 or so, obtain coats, trews, and hose of red and green tartan (described vaguely, and left to the men to furnish for themselves). Despite some writers interpreting the material as simply green and red, not necessarily of the exact same pattern in detail, MacKay (1924) provides some evidence of Grant militia wearing a consistent tartan by 1715, quoting a pamphlet (which other writers seem not to have examined) that wrote of Brigadier Grant's men as "orderly, ... well armed and clothed, in one livery of tartan".

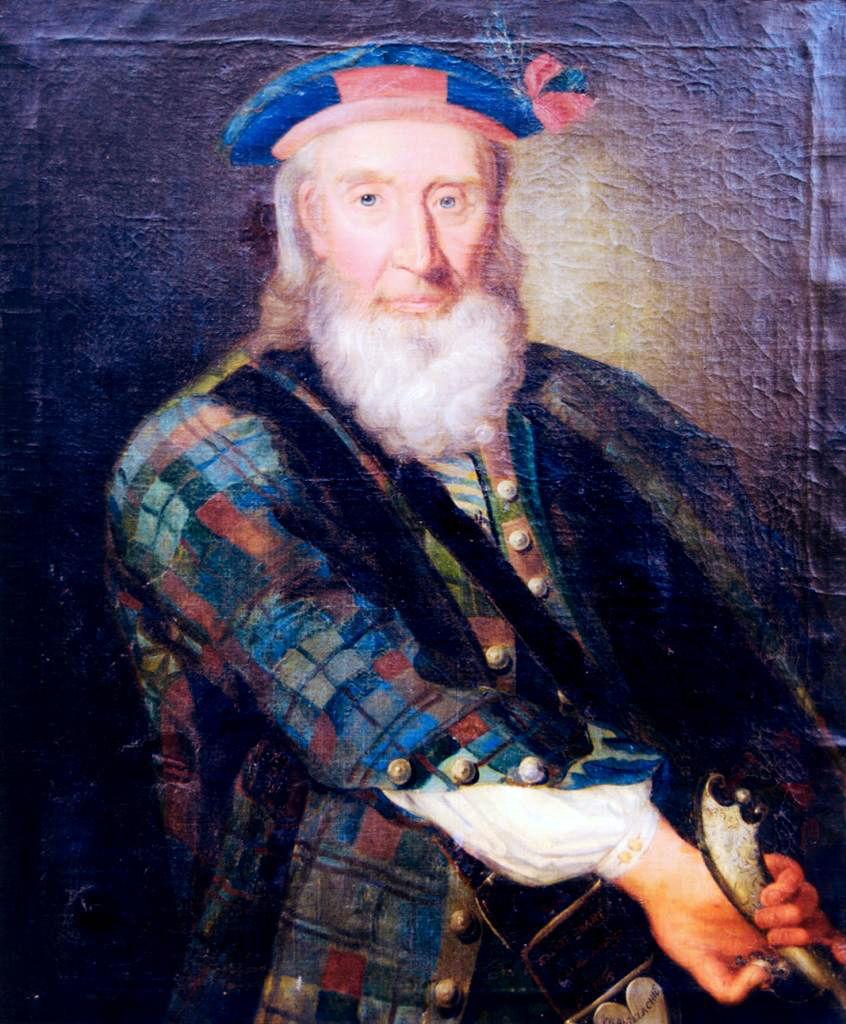
Robert Grant of Lurg, c. 1769 (Rossdhu House version), in tartan that may be that of the Independent Highland Companies

The Independent Highland Companies came and went, but were re-raised 1725–29, from clans loyal to the British government, (Note: Telfer Dunbar (1979) says the correct year is 1725 and that 1729 was an error introduced by Stewart of Garth (1822) and copied by later authors.) "and numbers of young men of respectable family flocked to their ranks". Evidence suggests that at least some of these reconstituted militia forces wore uniform tartans, to avoid association with a particular location or clan. (One of their main duties was enforcing the Disarming Act 1715 by dispossessing clansmen of their weaponry.) The tartans possibly initially varied slightly among units under different commanding officers, but were of blue, black, and green, presumably with differencing over-checks (thin lines added to the design). (Note: A legend, repeated in Mackay (1924) among others, has it that each unit "wore the [clan] tartan of its commander", but this evidence-free assertion can be traced directly to David Stewart of Garth (1822), the first and leading proponent of "ancient clan tartans" without proof. The grain of truth is that it is known of later regiments that they wore tartans chosen by their commanders, from a narrow range of options on a blue-black-and-green base.) They were all normalised to one tartan by no later than 1733 (a pattern which probably does not survive to the present day). (Note: Alternatively, it has been proposed that it was actually what later became the Black Watch tartan. Another idea is that it is revealed in portraits of Robert Grant of Lurg.) A 1725 order of Maj.-Gen. George Wade reads: "That the Offrs commanding Companies take care to provide a Plaid Cloathing & Bonnet in the Highland Dress for Non Commission Offcs & Soldiers belonging to their companies, the Plaid of the Company to be as near as they can of the same sort & Colour." (Note: This has sometimes been misquoted as "... the same sort or colour", making it seem more vague than it was.) This was followed by correspondence in 1733 making it clear that all the units were using the same tartan cloth, confirmed further in payment accounts for the cloth.

A fairly complicated argument has been made that the c. 1769 portrait of an elderly Robert Grant of Lurg (d. 1771) features him dressed in the military garb of his youth and that it shows the tartan of the independent companies. The portrait exists in four versions, three of which show a tartan similar to Black Watch, but with a broad reddish-brown band (the fourth replaced the tartan with a completely different red-and-black one).

Additional loyalist independent companies or clan militias were raised in 1745, to fight against rebel clans during the Jacobite rising of that year, and continued to 1747; they did not wear a uniform tartan, but did wear a uniform badge in the form of a black Hanoverian cockade with red or yellow saltire on the bonnet.

Between c. 1739 and the end of the Napoleonic Wars in 1815, over 100 battalions of line, fencible, militia, and volunteer regiments were to be raised in or predominantly in the Highlands, a substantial proportion of them in Highland dress; of these units, only some had distinct uniform tartans, and of those, only a small number were recorded to the present day.

== Early regiments ==
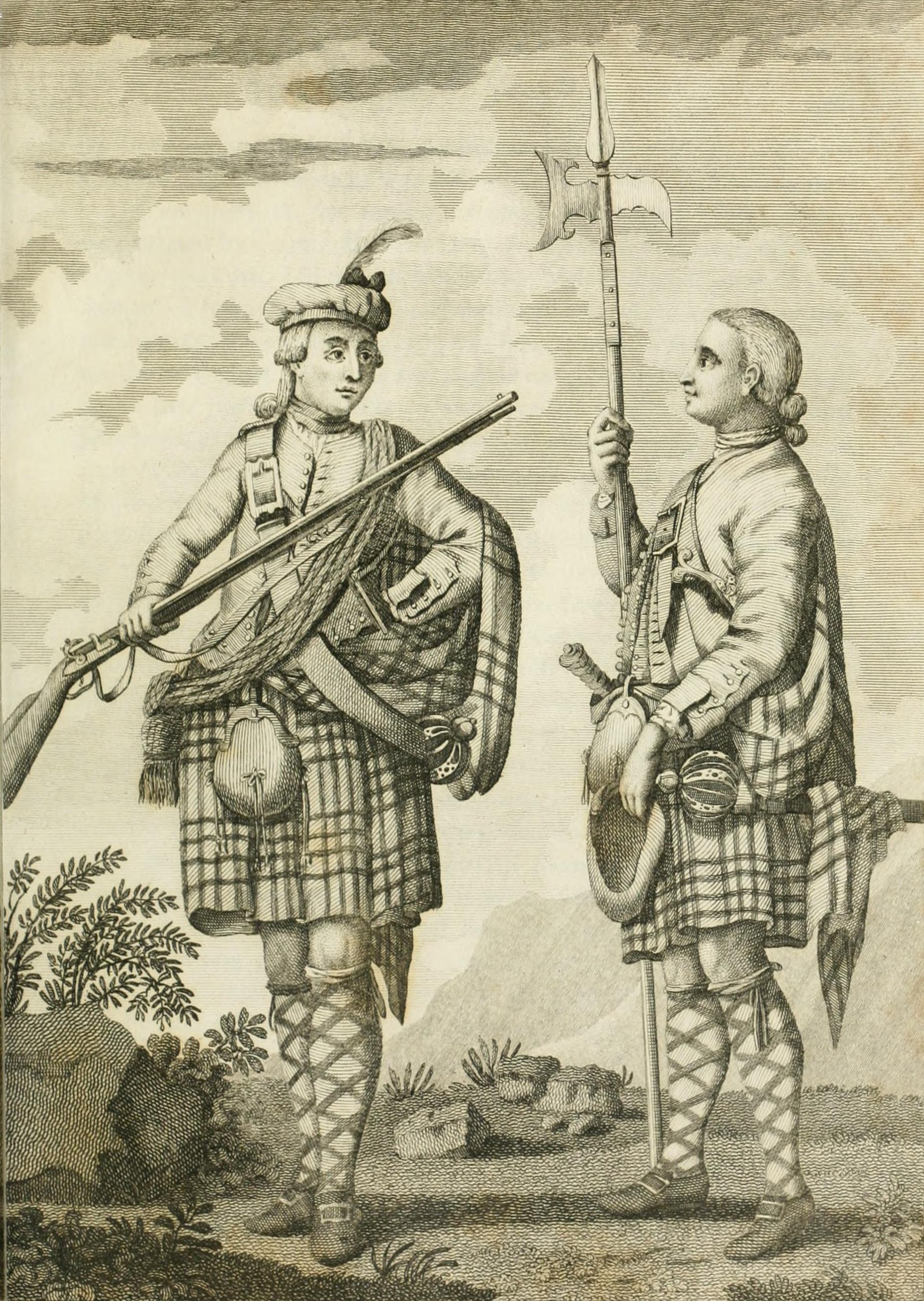
Soldiers from a Highland regiment c. 1740 wearing tartan belted plaids (great kilts).

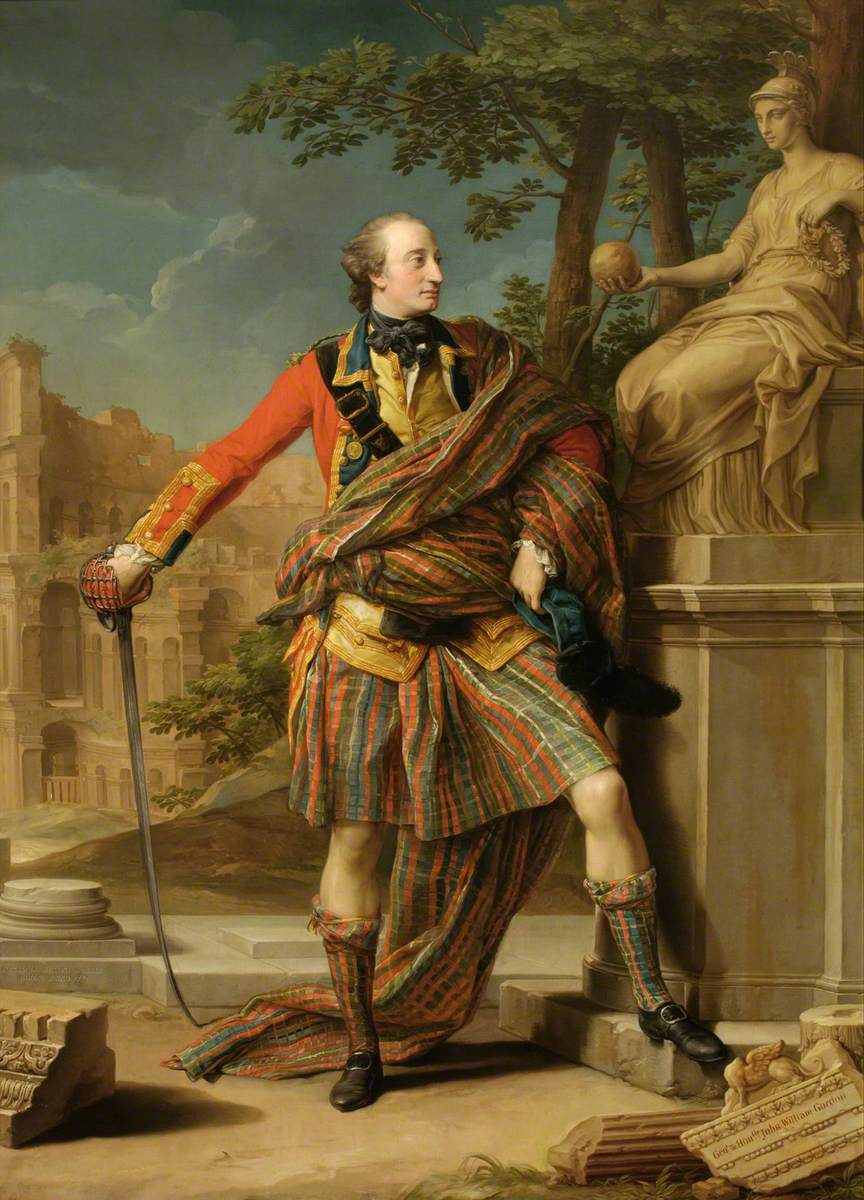
Gen. William Gordon, commander of the Queen's Own Royal Regiment of Highlanders (1760–63), in an unusual tartan with a striped appearance, which may or may not have been used by the regiment. (Portrait of William Gordon by Pompeo Batoni, 1766.)

The six original and four additional Independent Highland Companies were amalgamated in 1739 to become the Earl of Crawford's Highland Regiment, 43rd (later 42nd) Regiment of Foot, informally called the Black Watch (a name which became official in 1881, but may have dated to the independent company period). It was the first proper governmental Highland regiment, part of the British Army, and they wore the belted plaid ("great kilt") for dress, and (since at least as early as 1759) (Note: Possibly before 1740, according to Groves (1893), but it is not 100% certain that Groves did not begin chronologically, then diverge into general-information provision about uniforms, then resume the chronology at 1740.) the tailored small kilt for undress uniform.

For the former garment, (Note: Some writers have gotten this backwards; e.g., Smith (2020), who does not cite his own sources.) they used a distinctive tartan, which was designed for the unit. (Note: There are numerous hypotheses about the exact origins of the design, but none of them have a clear factual basis and are simply competing legends. They are summarized in Scarlett (1990). An alternative proposal, favoured by Telfer Dunbar (1979), is that the Black Watch tartan is actually identical to the Independent Highland Company tartan, and that the regiment did not after all receive a newly designed tartan. This seems at odds, however, with the tartan being referred to as the "42nd tartan".) It was originally called the "42nd tartan", so it probably was not adopted until the unit was renumbered the 42nd in 1749, and possibly not created until as late as 1757. It seems likely that the tartan was based on those used by the independent units earlier, but with double black "tram line" over-checks added. A simple line-art illustration of 1742 shows the 42nd's belted plaid worn, quite unusually, with the tartan set diagonally ("on the bias") to form diamonds instead of squares; while this could have been artistic license, there is another drawing from 1742 that shows the same, but a third illustration from c. 1743 shows it worn with stripes horizontal and vertical.

The Black Watch pattern was used by various other regiments, and it has been estimated that to clothe them all, some 30–40 miles (48–64 km) of the tartan had to be woven before 1750 alone. It became the basis of various later regimental (and eventually clan) tartans. (Note: Mackay (1924) claims, following his consistent but poorly evidenced thesis that the clan tartans are ancient ("there can be no doubt that each clan wore its own tartan", etc.), that Black Watch was derived by removing thin over-check lines from tartans of Campbells of Breadalbane, Cawdor, and Loudoun; and that over-checks were later re-added to distinguish one regiment from another. This does not agree with modern scholarship, nor even with accounts published by Clan Campbell. The Breadalbane tartan is known to date to a regiment, 1793–1802; Cawdor was one of Wilsons' numbered variations on Black Watch, then was known as "Argyll" or "Argylle" from 1798, and not named Campbell of Cawdor until 1850; Loudoun dates to 1906 or in a variant form to Clans Originaux ca. 1880.) It remains popular in general-public use under the names "Black Watch", "Government", and several others, but today officially called "Government No. 1" by the military.

The sett of the 42nd Regiment's original small-kilt tartan is not entirely certain, but it is believed to have had a red over-check added over the blue, the green, or probably both; it is sometimes called "the Atholl sett". (Note: Not to be confused with the sett of the Atholl Highlanders.) The best candidate for it appears in a Wilsons of Bannockburn record of 1785 (and was still in their Key Pattern Book in 1819 as "42nd Coarse Kilt with Red"); there is no surviving evidence to place it earlier, despite claims that it dates to c. 1750. It was used for the 42nd's small kilts until the belted plaid was abandoned c. 1814, after which the unit used their regular belted-plaid Black Watch tartan for the small kilt. Grenadiers of the regiment used this red-striped version also in their belted plaid. It survives in a uniforms illustration by David Morier c. 1751–1760, though the details are difficult to make out. (Note: Telfer Dunbar (1979) suggests another portrait shows it, one of John Campbell, Earl of Loudoun, by Allan Ramsay in 1747, with Telfer Dunbar describing it as "a green, blue, and black tartan with a red overstripe", but this is an error, as the tartan is undeniably a scarlet red ground with dark over-stripes. It is unclear what painting Telfer Dunbar actually had in mind.)

Loudoun's Highlanders (64th regiment) were raised in 1745. They used a tartan which had checks of blue and green with thick black borders around the blue, like Black Watch, featuring over-checks of red (on blue) and yellow (on green), and lacking the two black "tram lines" of Black Watch. This general colour scheme of blue, green, and black appears to have been imposed across the regiments from on high; "Lord Loudoun tried hard to get a red tartan for his men almost until the time when the regiment was disbanded but he never succeeded." Loudoun's 1747 portrait by Allan Ramsay shows him in the red Tullibardine tartan, which is of a similar style to other red tartans in portraits of the era. (Note: Telfer Dunbar (1979), working from a 1755 black-and-white engraving by J. Faber based on the painting, supposed that it illustrated the Loudoun's Highlanders regimental tartan, but this idea does not agree with Scarlett (1990)'s information that the unit never got a red tartan. Similarly, Allan Ramsay painted David Ogilvy, 6th Earl of Airlie, in 1745, and a 1914 work claimed it was a portrait in uniform, but later writers disagree and believe it to be his civilian attire, as the original Orderly Book of Lord Ogilvy's Regiment (1745–46) mentions no uniform tartan for this Jacobite unit.)

Largely at the instigation of William Pitt the Elder, Earl of Chatham, new regiments – nine line and two fencible – were raised for the Seven Years' War (1756–1763), then disbanded after; little seems to have been recorded of what they were wearing. The short-lived Queen's Own Royal Regiment of Highlanders (105th Regiment of Foot), was formed for three years from more of the independent companies in 1760 by William Gordon. A heavily classicism-inspired portrait of Gordon in regimental uniform appears to show a now-rare type of tartan with markedly differing warp and weft, forming more of a striped than checked appearance, if the painting illustrates it accurately. But there is no evidence that the specific tartan itself was integral to the uniform (and it would have required a lot of expensive red dye). (Note: It is similar in colour-scheme to the pattern recorded in more typical matching-warp-and-weft form as Gordon red in 1819, and also known as old Huntly. It actually looks even more similar to another "Gordon red" variant, but that one appears not to have been recorded until James Mackinlay's collection of the 1930s–1950s, and thus might be based on the painting.)

== Late 18th century diversification ==
Other Highland regiments were raised later for service in India, America, and the Napoleonic Wars, a formative middle period in the history of the regiments. For many Scottish lairds, raising a regiment in service to the king was, after the Jacobite uprisings, a way of rehabilitating the family name, assuring new-found loyalty to the British (now Hanoverian) crown, and currying royal favour (even regaining forfeited estates). Exempt from the Dress Act 1746 (which banned the male wearing of Highland dress in the Scottish Highlands), men in these regiments of the empire were given Highland dress as a sort of safe, subsumed, post-Union Scottish nationalism.

Founded c. 1765, the weaver William Wilson & Son of Bannockburn (Wilsons for short) by c. 1770 and onward throughout the 19th century had a near-monopoly on tartan weaving for the regiments (and came to dominate tartan weaving in general). They produced different grades of regimental cloth for officers, sergeants, and enlisted.

Regiments in this era frequently changed designations (sometimes to confusingly similar names) and were amalgamated into other units; the names used below are their early ones. Regimental uniforms, including tartans, were left – within the general Black Watch-based colour scheme – to their commanders; a colonel's personal preference and reputation were definite factors, making for aesthetic as well as practical choices. The belted plaid was abandoned by the regiments in favour of the small kilt, around 1814.

Two of these mid-period regiments first used Black Watch, then in 1787 adopted a variant of it with thin over-checks of red (on half the blue spans) and white (on green). These were MacLeod's Highlanders (73rd, later 71st, Regiment of Foot, raised 1777–78), and the original Seaforth Highland Regiment (78th, later 72nd, raised 1778). (Note: Not to be confused with the second Seaforth's Highlanders, also raised as the 78th, in 1793. The original Seaforth's Highlanders were amalgamated with other units under the Childers Reforms to become the 1881 Seaforth Highlanders.) According to Telfer Dunbar (1979) and the Scottish Register of Tartans, the pattern actually goes back to an even earlier unit, the 78th (Highlanders) also known as the Ross-shire Buffs, raised 1793, before they amalgamated into Seaforth's Highlanders. Regardless, the tartan was called "Mackenzie–MacLeod" after commanding officers of the two units, and eventually became the Clan Mackenzie tartan, though it remains used as an official British military tartan, designated "Government No. 5A". A slight variation, with yellow in place of white, became one of the Clan MacLeod tartans. Wilsons' patterns books of c. 1790s also record another tartan for MacLeod's 71st; as it is based on the drummers' plaid sett of the 42nd, it was probably the drummers' plaid of the 71st (and possibly also of the associated Seaforth's and Ross-shire units, though there is no way to be certain with the surviving source material).

Raised in 1787, the 74th (Highland) Regiment of Foot (Note: Not to be confused with the earlier 74th Regiment of (Highland) Foot, raised 1777.) used another variant of the Black Watch tartan with a black-guarded white over-check, on the green. Also in 1787, the 75th (Highland) Regiment, later 75th (Stirlingshire), raised by Col. Robert Abercromby of Airthrey, probably used a more distinct tartan, not based on Black Watch, of purple and black on a green ground, with thin white (on green) and thinner black (on purple) over-checks; it was later called "No. 64 or Abercromby" by Wilsons, and though it did not become adopted as an Abercromby/Abercrombie clan tartan, variants of it became two unrelated clan patterns. (Note: "No. 64" existed in various minor variations like "No. 2/64 or Abercrombie with Yellow", which had yellow instead of white); "No. 120", with red instead of black overcheck on purple; "Graham of Montrose" with blue instead of purple (though there are two other tartans by that name); and "Campbell of Breadalbane" with blue and yellow instead of purple and white.)

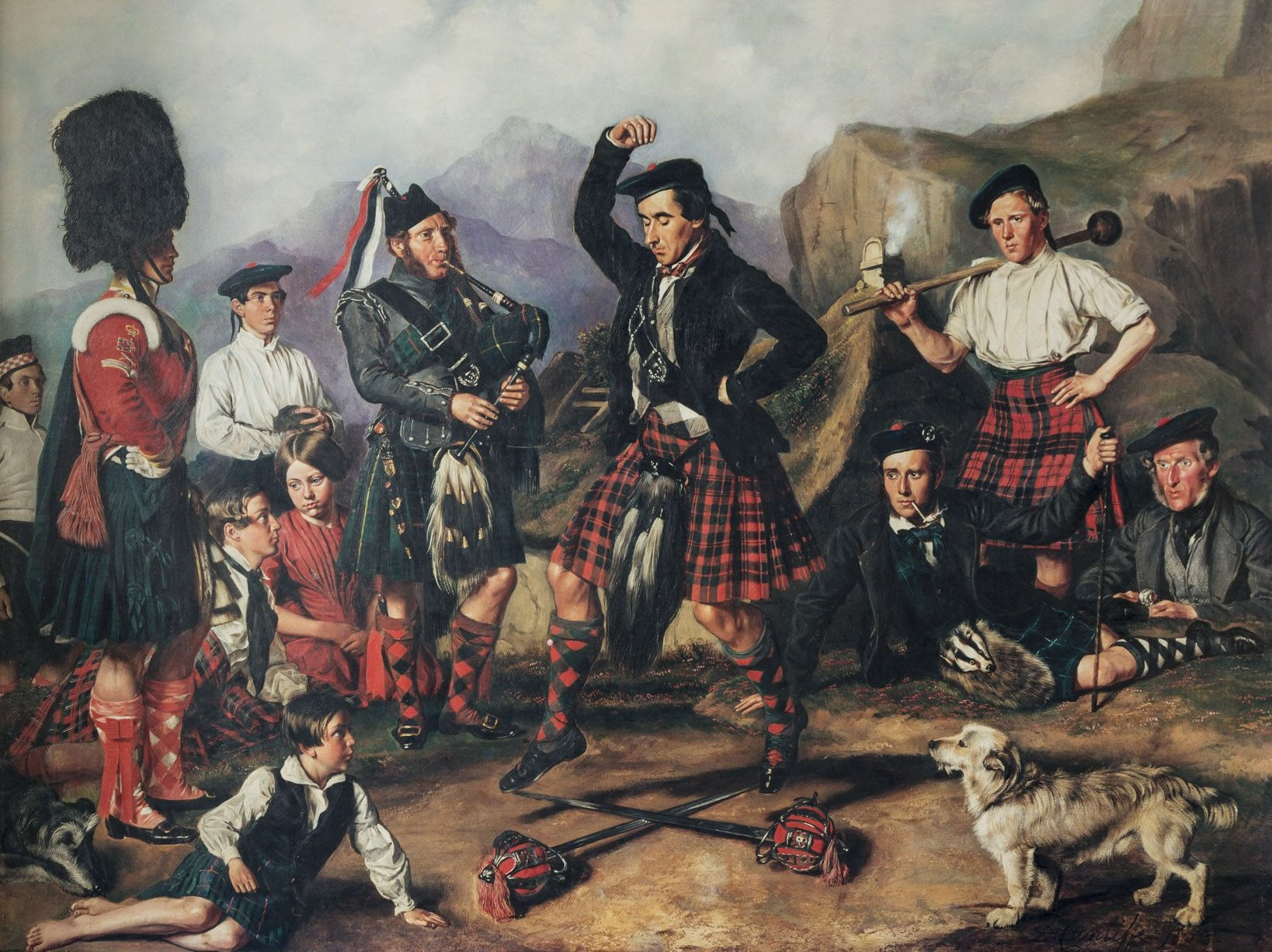
The Sword Dance by David Cunliffe, 1853, depicting men of the 42nd and 93rd. The dancer in the centre wears the 42nd's red band tartan.

The Gordon Highlanders (100th, later 92nd) also wore an altered Black Watch, this time with a thin yellow over-check (on green, and with no black guard lines around the yellow). In a rare show of competition to Wilsons, the pattern was designed in 1793 and supplied by weaver William Forsyth of Huntly, Aberdeen. The troops were not actually raised until 1794. A kilt of this regiment still survives in remarkable condition. This pattern (sometimes with black guard lines added on either side of the yellow over-check) became the main tartan of Clan Gordon. Something identical or nearly identical to the original pattern (perhaps with the yellow over-check in a different width) was also used by the 8th (Rothesay and Caithness) Fencibles.

Also in 1793, the Cameronian Volunteers (79th Regiment, later Queen's Own Cameron Highlanders) used a comparatively distinct tartan, later (by c. 1830) the family tartan of Cameron of Erracht (a minor branch of Clan Cameron), typically with a more vibrant blue. It is structurally much like Black Watch, but without black over-checks and with a number of yellow and red over-checks. It bears similarities to the MacDonald and main Cameron tartans, and has been said to have been designed by unit leader Alan Cameron of Erracht's mother or grandmother (a MacLean) or by Alan himself, perhaps from a tartan in use in the Clan Donald area. (Note: This is based largely on an 1898 account that claims that the "clan" tartans of Cameron and MacDonald were blended by Alan Cameron's mother, but there is no evidence of either clan having adopted a clan tartan as early as 1793.)

The Fraser Fencibles were raised 1794–95 by James Fraser of Belladrum, son of Chief Archibald Campbell Fraser of Lovat. The unit disbanded, under John Simon Frederick Fraser, in 1802. They used a tartan with a red ground and green and blue bands, unrelated to the Black Watch style.

The Sutherland Highlanders (93rd) raised 1799, and later the Argyll and Sutherland Highlanders (Princess Louise's) formed 1881 by amalgamation of the 93rd with the Argyllshire Highlanders (91st), may have worn a lightened version of Black Watch, with azure or Balmoral blue in place of the original dark blue; recorded 1797 by Wilsons (originally as a 42nd/Black Watch pattern-book variant); this is the view of Scarlett (1990) and Bain (1953). However, Eslea MacDonald (2012) indicates that in Wilsons' pattern books, the Sutherland and 42nd regiments were assigned the same tartan, suggesting that the pale version was not a special weave for the 93rd, but that it was simply the colour of Black Watch as made at that particular point in time by the weaver, and was used by all the Black Watch-wearing units, 93rd included. Regardless, the pattern has been worn as a Sutherland district tartan and (in light or dark palette) as one of the Clan Sutherland setts (sometimes in further modified form). it is also still militarily used as sett "Government No. 1A", with a somewhat lightened green. The original tartan of the 91st is uncertain.

Some of this unit-specific tartan variation continued into the beginning of the 19th century. E.g., the Loyal Clan Donnachie Volunteers, a unit of irregulars raised in 1803, had its own uniform tartan, which was later adopted as the hunting Robertson/Donnachie/Duncan tartan. While clearly influenced by Black Watch, it is something of a distortion of its usual proportions.

Some regiments also developed separate tartans for their pipers and drummers, and these could depart from the typical black-blue-green style. The band or musicians' tartan of the 42nd was the Black Watch pattern with black replaced by red. (Note: Stewart of Garth (1822) misreported this red tartan as the royal Stewart, a claim that has sometimes reappeared in later writers, another "tartan legend".) It was recorded in the 1819 Key Pattern Book of Wilsons of Bannockburn, and it featured clearly (on the central, dancing figure) in an 1853 painting by David Cunliffe. (Note: The Cunliffe painting also shows various other tartans, including the red Ross in the background.) This tartan was in use by the 42nd from at least as early as 1780 through to c. 1865, and featured in several other regimental portraits. The pattern was also used by bandsmen of the 93rd for a time, from the 1830s, judging from period portraits. Both units' musicians switched to Black Watch in 1865. The 42nd's drummers may have also used a distinct tartan for their plaids; there is a 1795 Wilsons entry for this tartan (Black Watch with black over-checks removed, and yellow ones added over green, and red ones, some doubled, across blue and black), but it is unclear whether the unit actually ever used it.

Wilsons sometimes used purple in place of blue for officers' tartan cloth, and the exact shades of blue and green used varied over time, despite the company's consistency efforts. By the turn of the 18th and 19th centuries, women in Scotland were especially "desirous to dress in the uniform plaids of their husbands", in particularly fine-quality cloth, according to records of Wilsons. After the Highland regiments proved themselves fearless and effective in various military campaigns, the glory associated with them did much to keep alive, initially among the gentry and later the general public, an interest in tartan and kilts, which might have otherwise slipped into obscurity due to the Dress Act's prohibition.

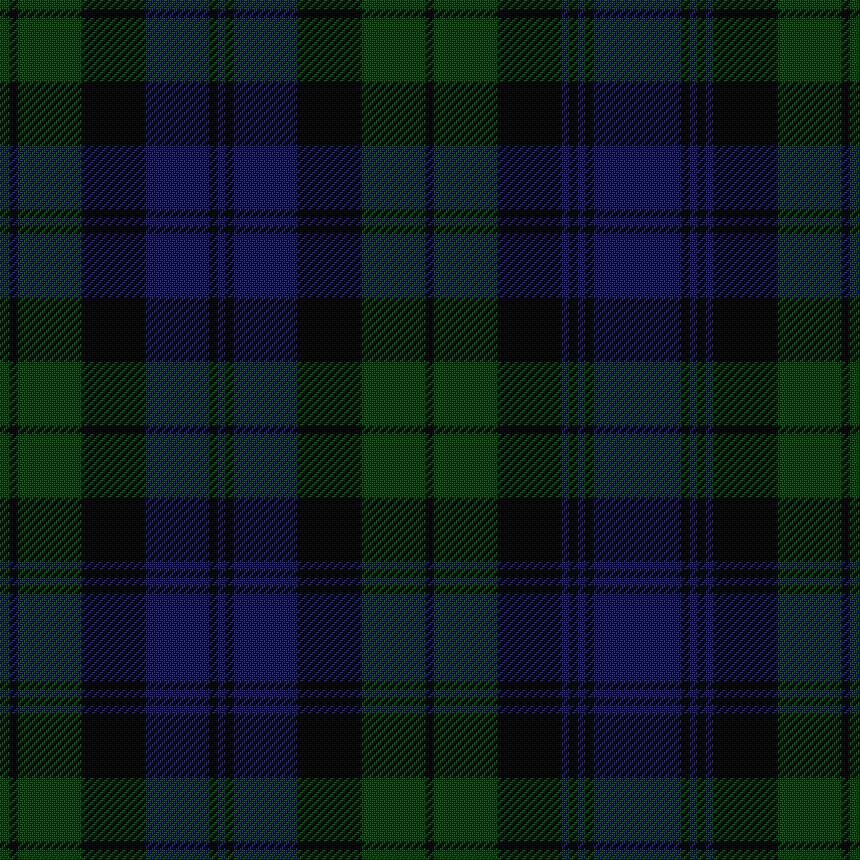
42nd Black Watch (Earl of Crawford's) and other regiments; also used as "Government No. 1" for some later units, and (among other tartans) by clans Campbell, Grant, and Munro

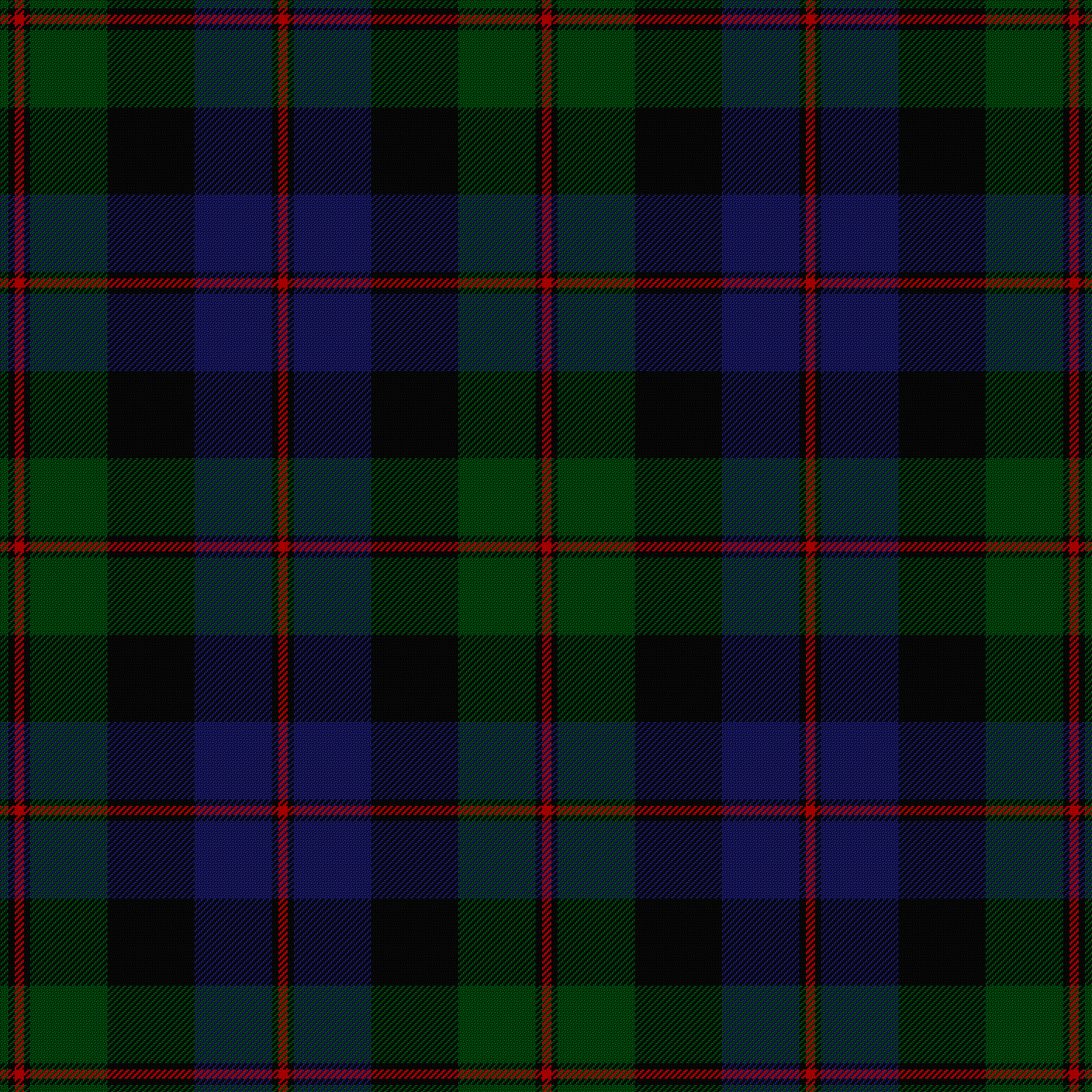
Probably the original 42nd Black Watch small-kilt sett, dropped in favour of Black Watch tartan when the belted plaid was abandoned

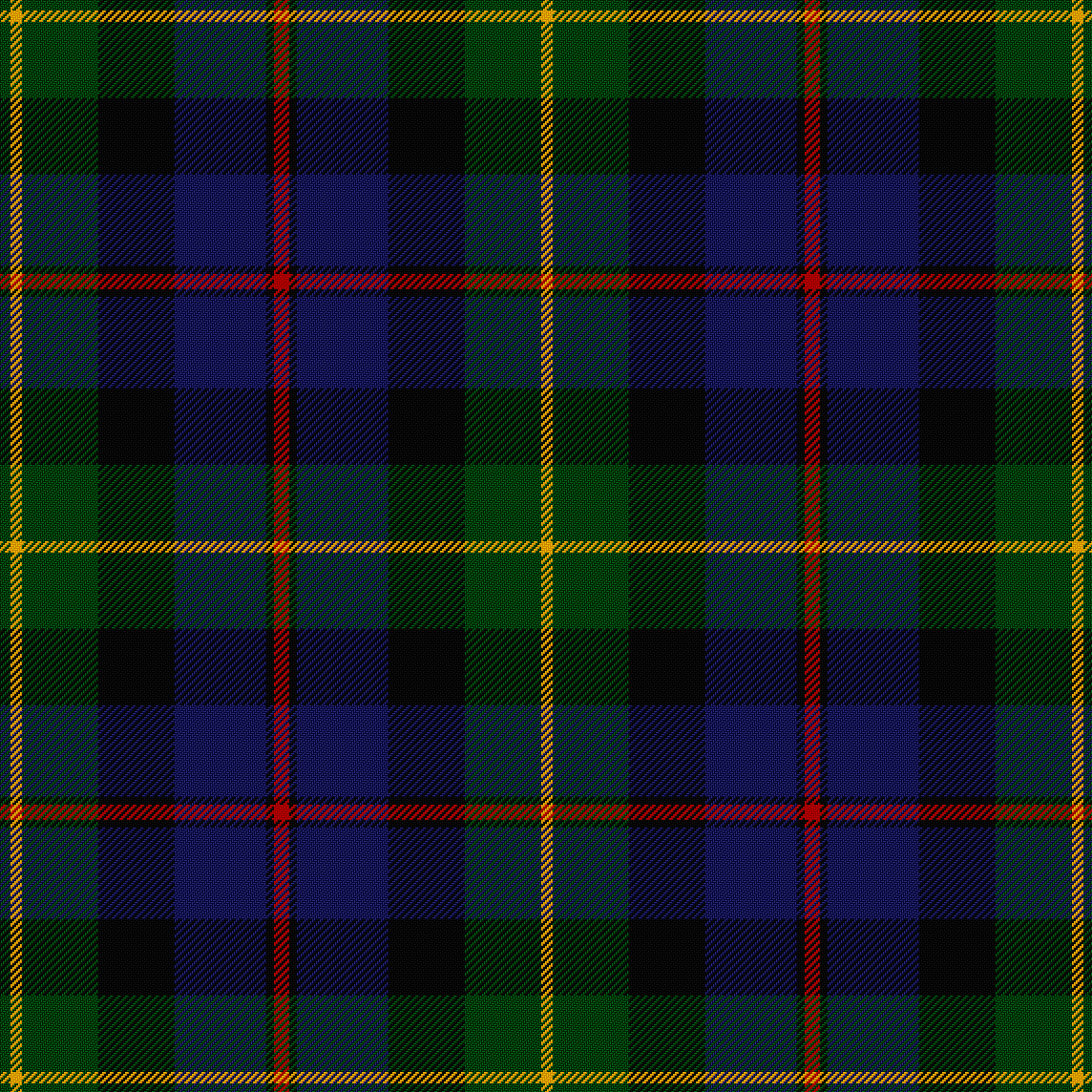
64th (Loudoun's Highlanders)

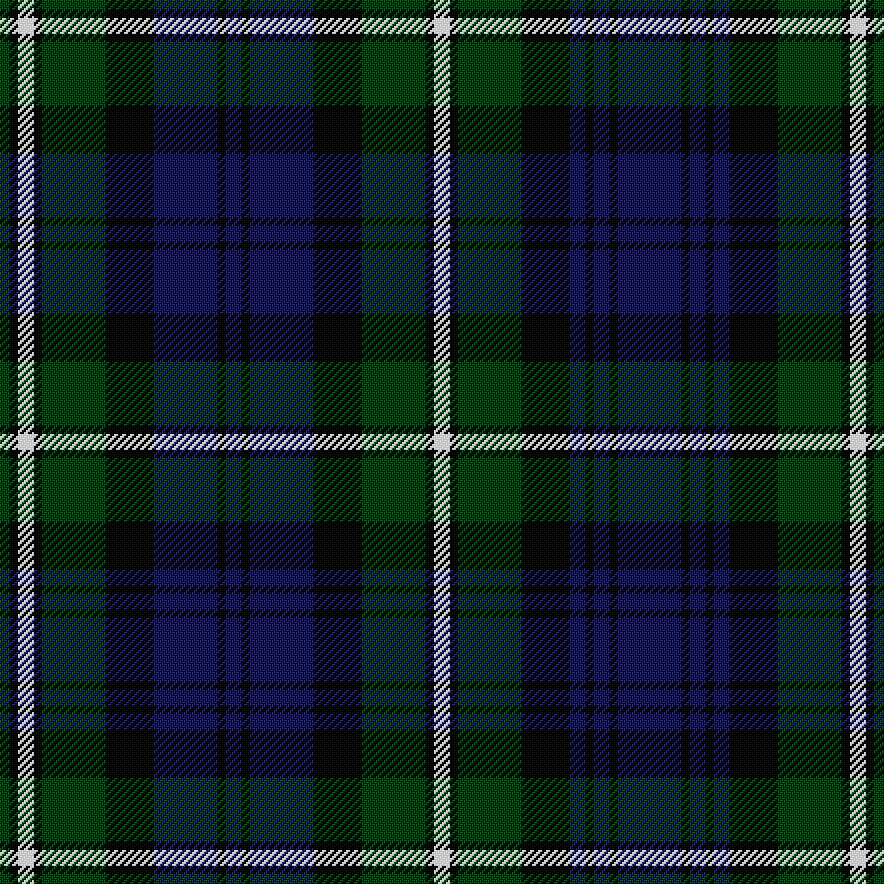
74th (Highland) Regiment

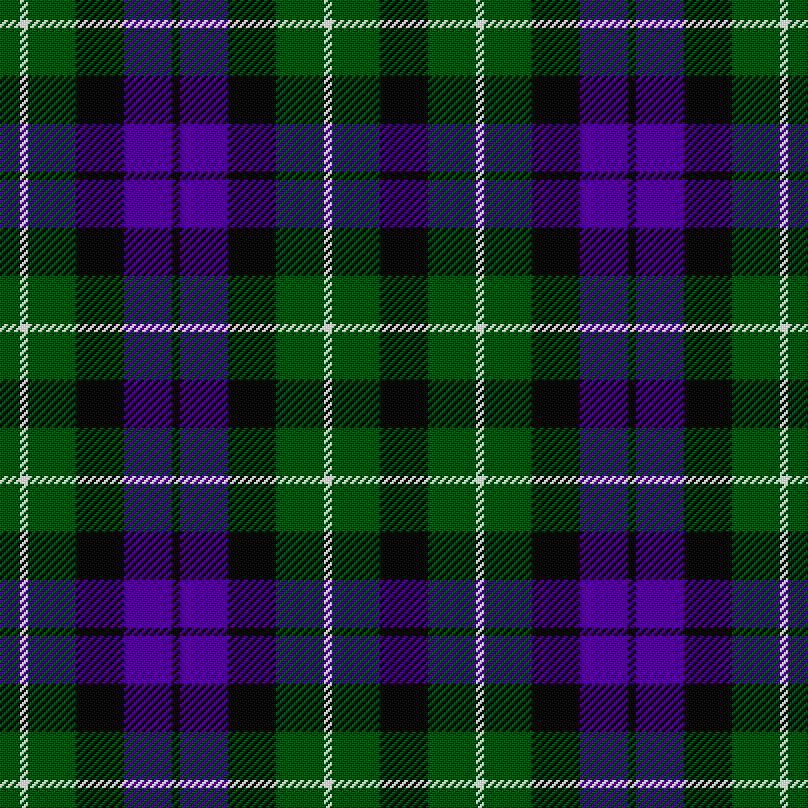
Probable tartan of 75th Highland or Stirlingshire Regiment, also known as Wilsons' pattern "No. 64 or Abercromby"

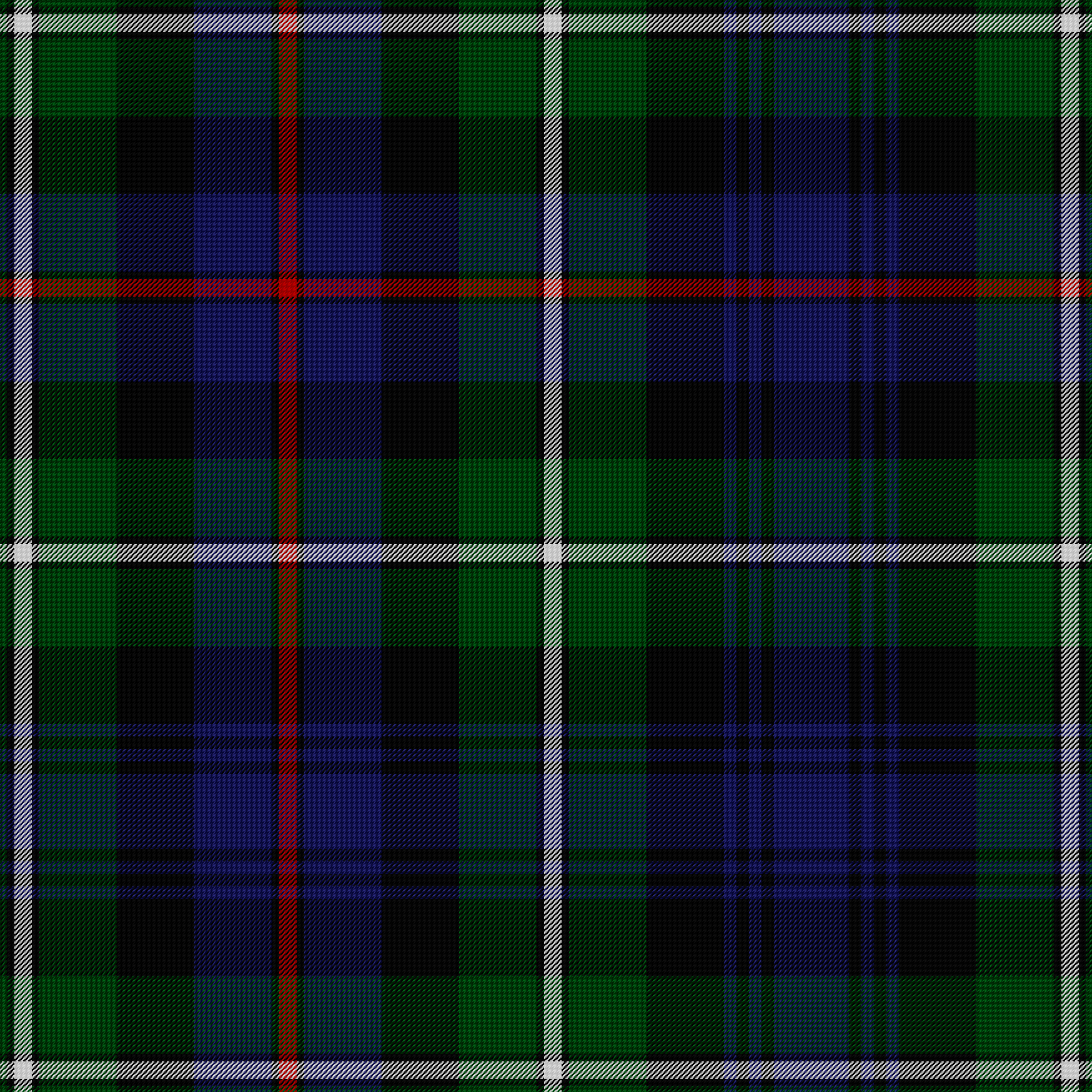
71st MacLeod's Highlanders, 72nd Seaforth Highland, and 78th Highlanders Ross-shire Buffs; became the clan tartan of Mackenzie, and used as "Government No. 5A" for some later units

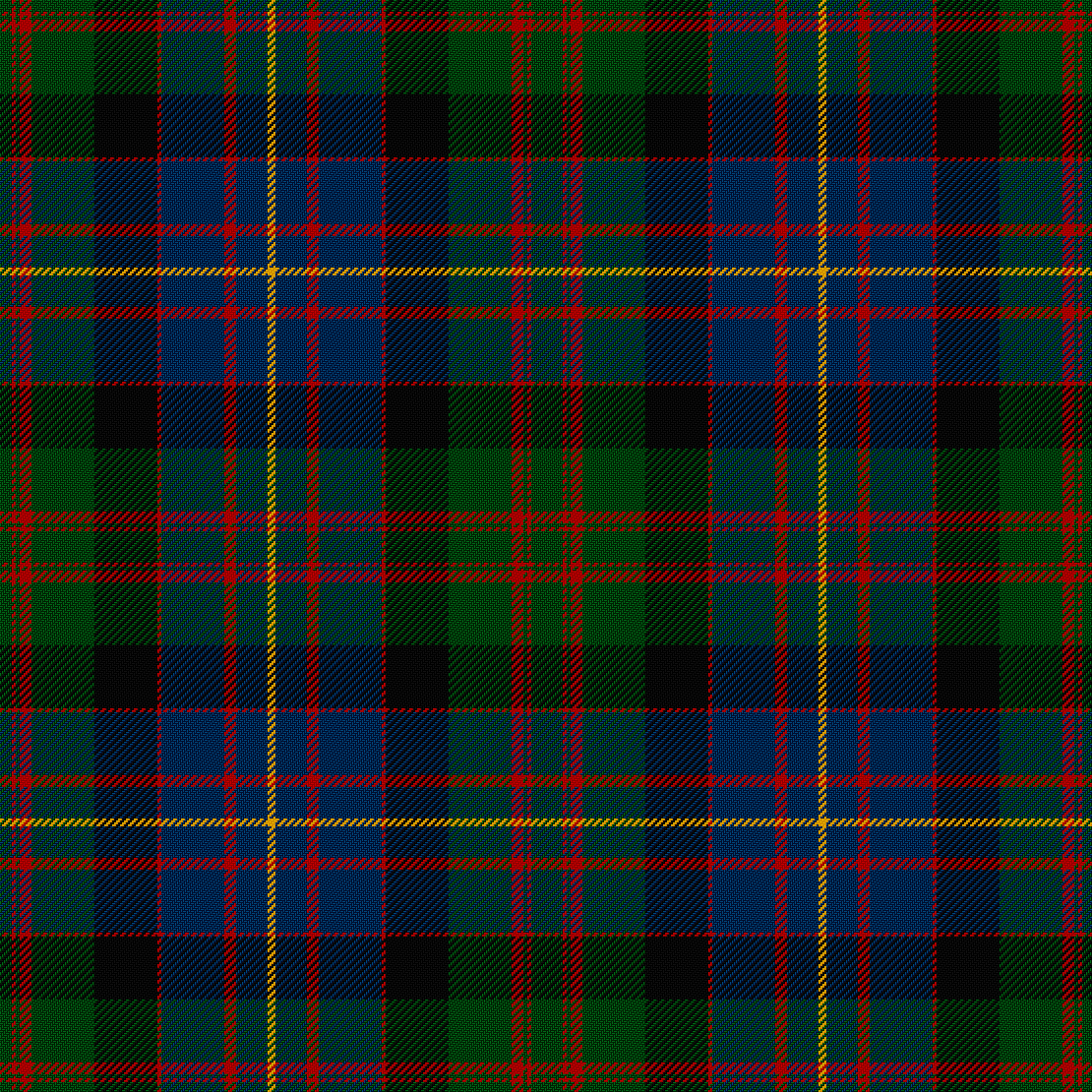
79th Cameronian Volunteers, later Queen's Own Cameron Highlanders; now also the tartan of the Cameron of Erracht branch of Clan Cameron

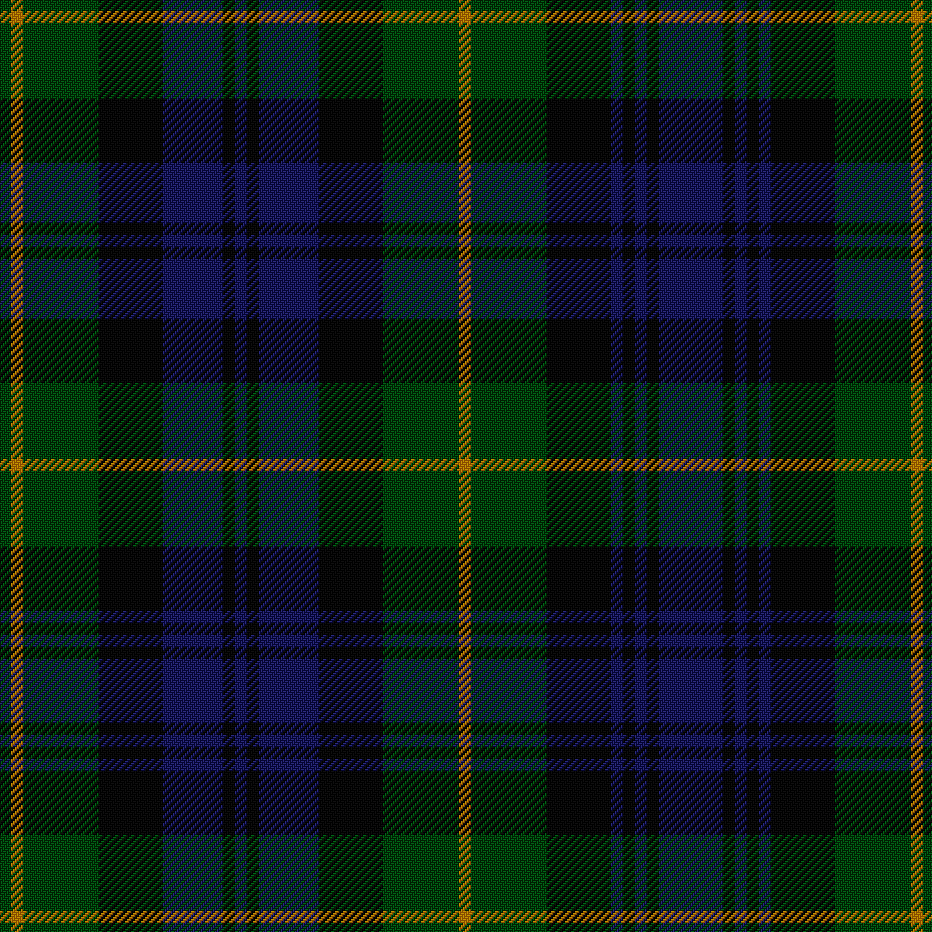
92nd Gordon Highlanders; became the main tartan of Clan Gordon (sometimes with black guard lines); also apparently used by 8th (Rothesay and Caithness) Fencibles

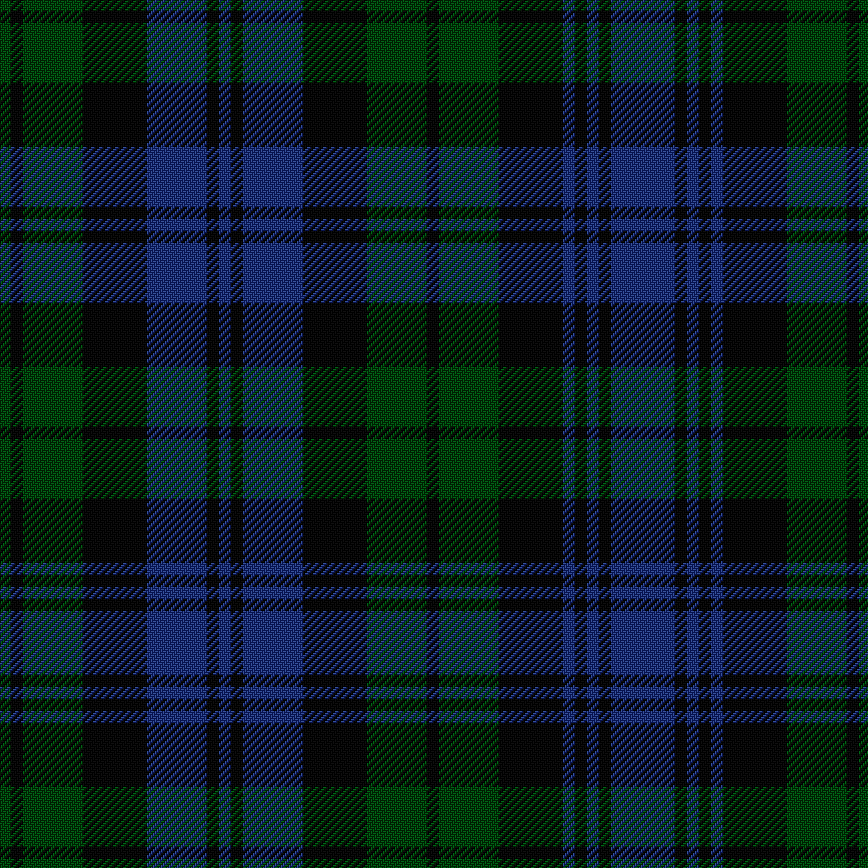
Possible lighter variant of Black Watch for 93rd Sutherland Highlanders, later Argyll & Sutherland Highlanders (Princess Louise's); also used as a Sutherland district and Clan Sutherland tartan; a variant later became "Government No. 1A"

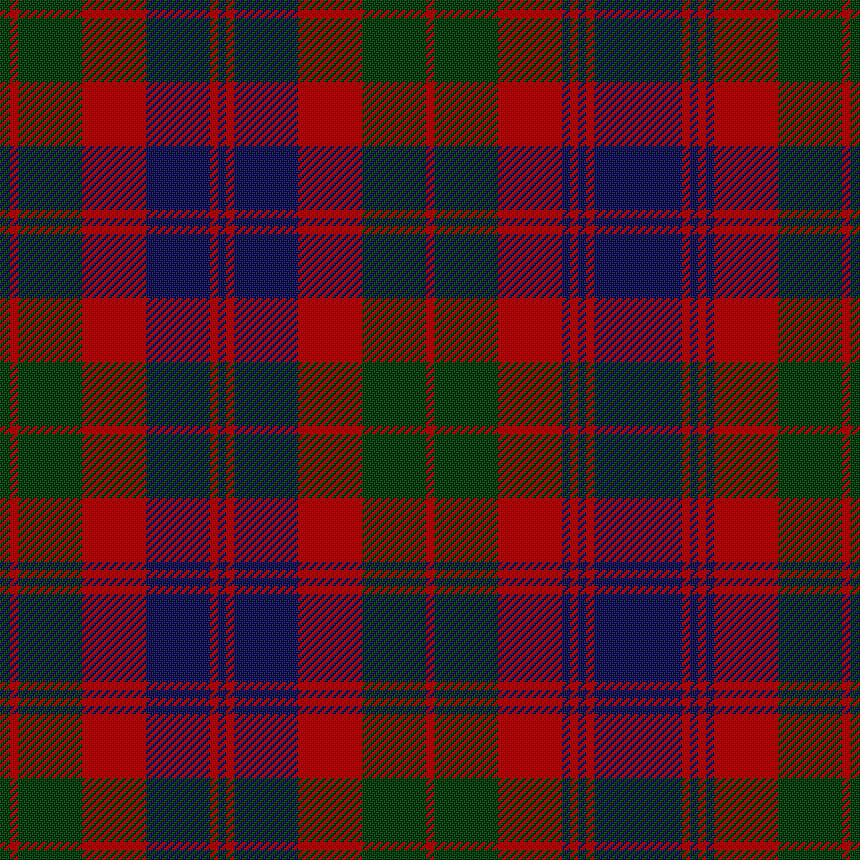
Band tartan of 42nd Black Watch and 93rd Sutherland Highlanders

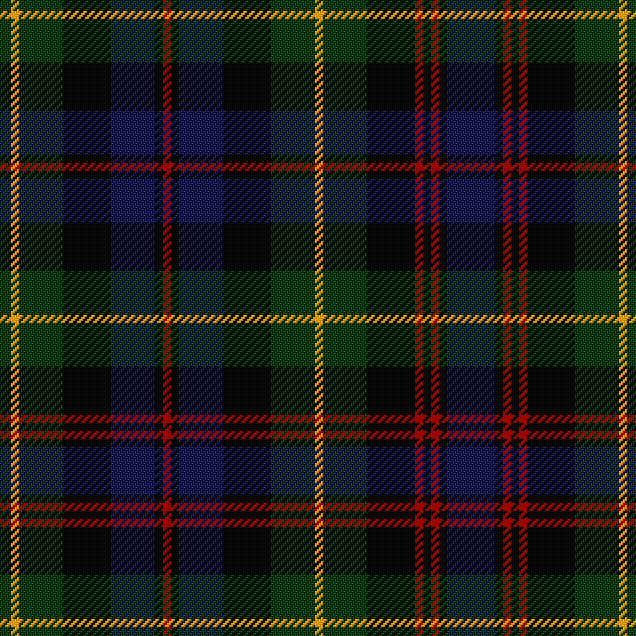
42nd Black Watch drummers' plaid sett; may not have actually been deployed

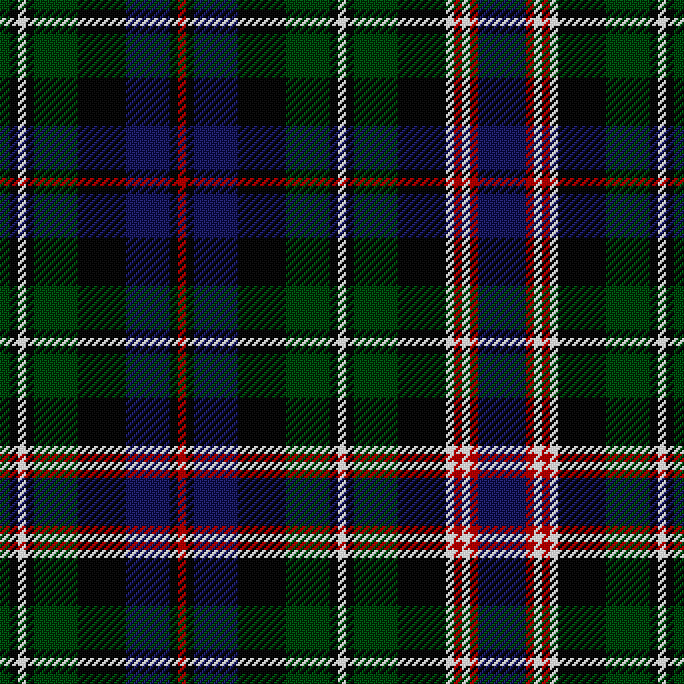
Probable 71st MacLeod's drummers' plaid sett; may not have actually been deployed

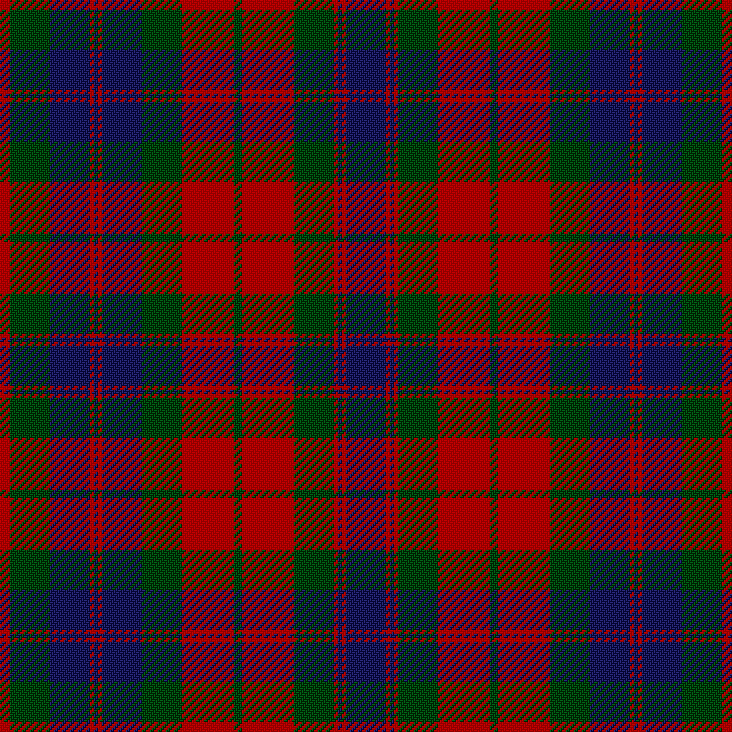
Fraser Fencibles; also used as a general Fraser clan tartan

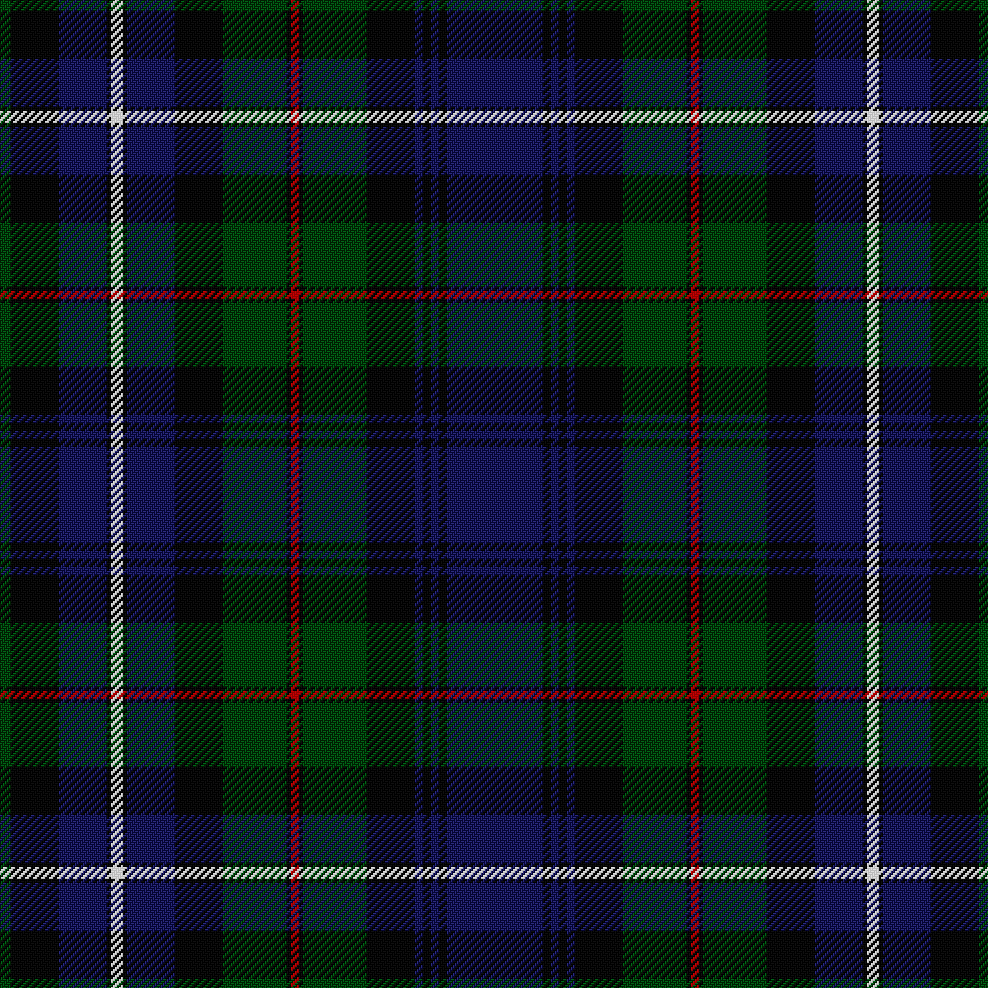
Loyal Clan Donnachie Volunteers; later the hunting tartan of Clan Robertson/Donnachaidh/Duncan

== Influence on clan tartans ==
Tartan scholars generally agree that a confluence of regimental tartans and regional or "district" tartans inspired the adoption of clan tartans in the early 19th century (some few possibly dating to the late 18th). Some regimental tartans were directly adopted by clans, including Cameron of Erracht, Gordon, Mackenzie, and Roberson/Donnachie/Duncan (in a few cases more than one clan at a time adopted the same regimental tartan, e.g. Black watch is also known as old Campbell, hunting Grant, and hunting Munro, and a brighter version is hunting Sutherland), while many other clan tartans were based on Black Watch tartan with some differences added, including Forbes, Lamont, hunting MacRae, and Urquhart.

== Later use ==
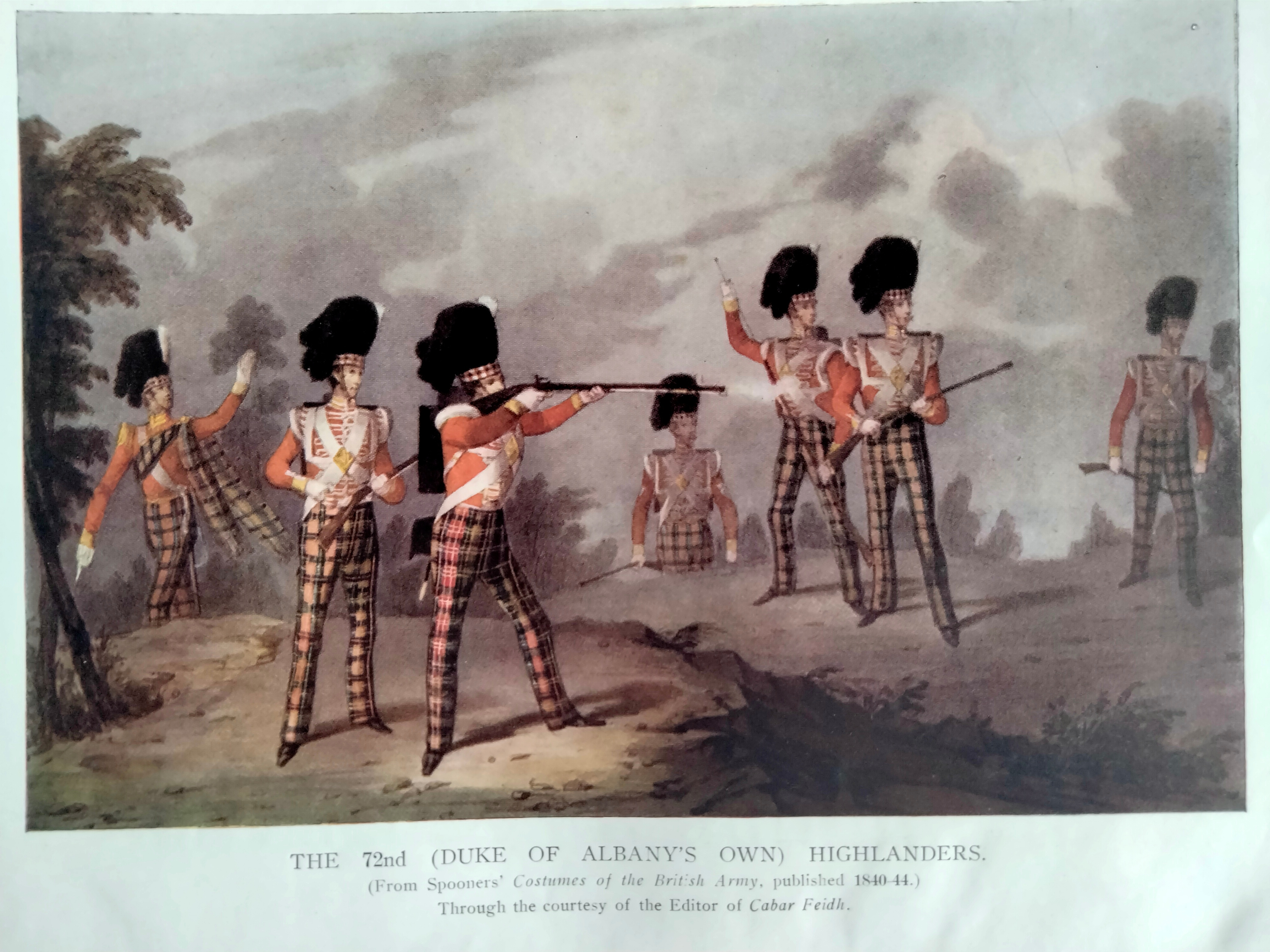
72nd Duke of Albany's Own Highlanders during a trews-wearing period, c. 1844, in the tartan named for Prince Charles Edward Stuart

After the "clan tartanry" rush of the early to mid-19th century, various of the later Highland regiments adopted some of the recently minted clan tartans for their uniforms (reversing the original regimental-into-clan-tartan flow). Some of these adoptions remain in regimental use today, including tartans of clans Douglas, Erskine (red), Leslie, Rose (hunting), Stewart (royal and hunting), and Sutherland. (Note: The main Sutherland tartan, another variant of Black Watch, with over-check of red and two white stripes, first appears in surviving records in 1829. It is unclear whether it was originally used for a while by the 93rd (Sutherland Highlanders) Regiment of Foot (raised 1799), ancestral to the later units that have used this tartan to the present day.)

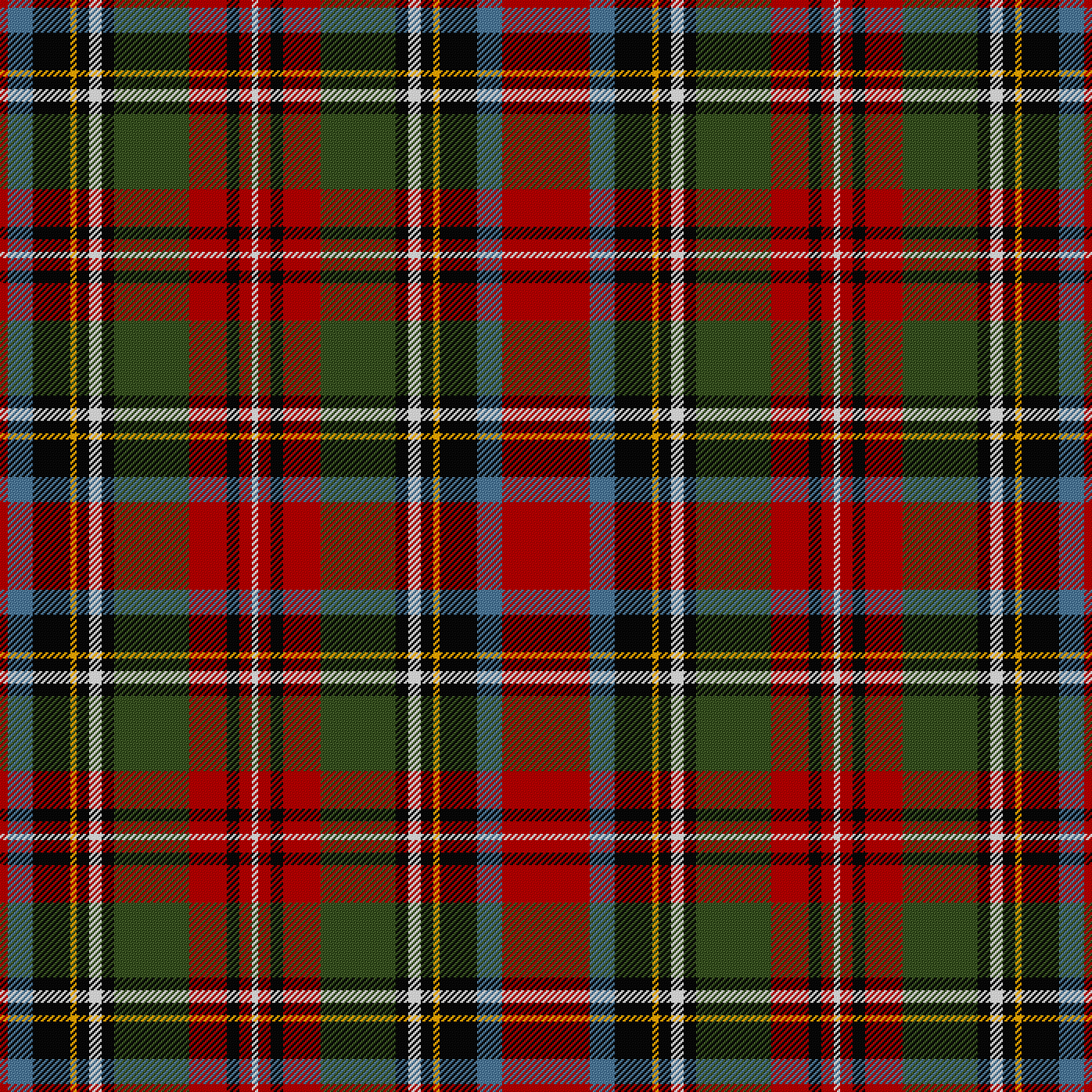
The Prince Charles Edward Stuart tartan, as used for the 72nd's trews

During a trews-wearing period of 1823–1881, the Duke of Albany's Own Highlanders (formerly Seaforth's; 78th, later 72nd) wore a tartan called Prince Charles Edward Stuart; it is essentially the same as royal Stewart but with a reduced red area, using lighter blue and green in regimental attire as shown in a period painting. Clan and fashion use today have the same palette as royal Stewart. Identified in surviving cloth samples from the mid-18th century (before the regiment), it is one of the oldest setts in continuous production. (Note: The "Prince Charles Edward Stuart" pattern was also sometimes called "small Stewart", easily confused with "smallest Prince Charles", a Wilsons pattern that has an even more reduced red area.) Records from Wilsons (a century later) seemed to indicate they believed (or wanted customers to believe) it had actually originated with the Prince, though there is no further way to verify the idea. W. & A. Smith (1850) claimed it outright, however, saying that W. F. Skene possessed a coat from "the Young Pretender" that proved it; later examination determined the coat to be from the 19th century.

The Lowland regiments (dating in some form to 1633 and never before dressed in Highland garb but in a variant of regular army uniform) were outfitted in tartan trews in 1881. This both linked them with and distinguished them from the tartan-kilted Highland regiments. (Note: Some confusion still resulted. E.g., the "Highland Light Infantry" of 1881–1959 were actually a trews-dressed Lowland unit. All the Highland regiments were "de-kilted" for a period after 1809, in an effort to recruit from beyond the Highlands. And the Royal Highland Regiment had worn trews for a period around the 1820s; later, the Rothesay and Caithness Fencibles (1794–1802) did likewise, as did the Duke of Albany's Own Highlanders. Various Highland units also wore trousers for particular campaigns.) Typically the "Government" (Black Watch) tartan was used, though some units later diversified, e.g. the King's Own Scottish Borderers adopted Leslie tartan in 1881, and the Cameronians (Scottish Rifles) used Douglas from 1891. Several Highland regiments were again assigned new tartans that were clan tartans rather than unit-specific ones; e.g. the Royal Scots adopted the hunting Stewart tartan in 1901.

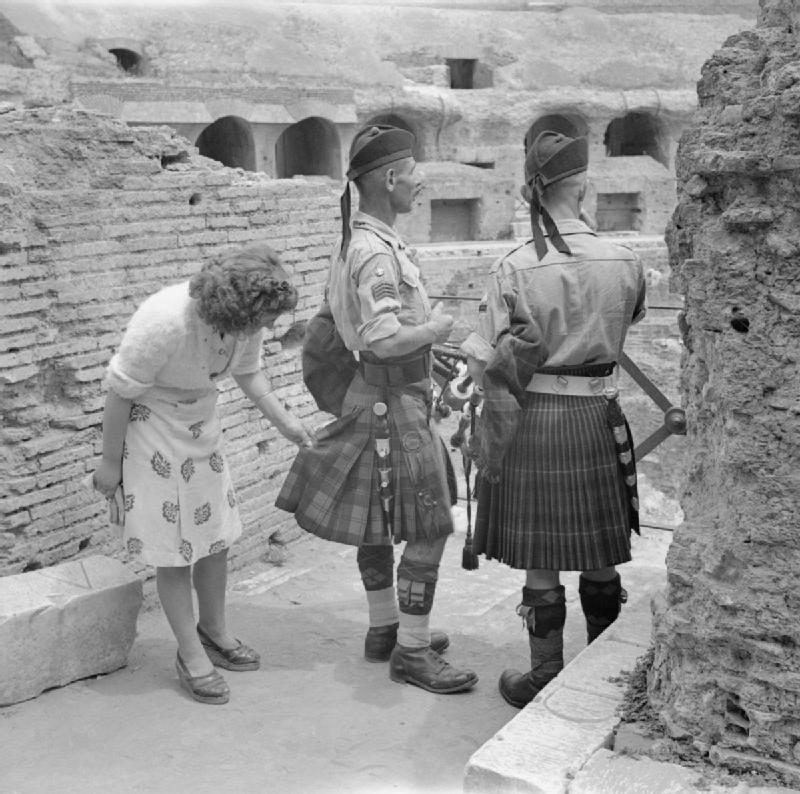
An Italian woman inspects the kilts of two pipe majors in Rome, 1944, toward the end of kilts as undress uniform in Highland regiments

There has been some confusion regarding tartans called "Universal", "Childers", and "Childers Universal". Black Watch was for a while dubbed Universal by the War Office after the Childers Reforms of 1881; the plan was to impose it on all the Scottish regiments, an idea later abandoned after outcry. A tartan called Childers was worn by the 8th Gurkha Rifles and 1st Battalion, 1st Gurkha Rifles; it was dark green with red stripes, and said variously to have been based on Black Watch, Sutherland, or Mackintosh. The Childers Universal sett is something completely different, designed in 1907 for "a distinguished regiment of the Indian Army"; it is a variant of Mackintosh, featuring a black ground with two different green checks: one the shade "of beech leaves", and the Mackintosh blue replaced by "ash leaf green". (Note: The confusion is largely due to discrepancies between different editions of Frank Adam's The Clans, Septs and Regiments of the Scottish Highlands. Even the Scottish Register of Tartans has them mixed up, showing Childers Universal mis-recorded as "Childers (Gurkha Rifles)" and with incorrect text that refers to a green-and-blue variant instead of the green-and-green version correctly shown.)

In all, there are at least 38 documented tartans that have at one time or another been associated with regiments, though many of them also with clans. (Note: The commercial tartan weaver D. C. Dalgliesh provides a list of those that they supply, and it includes a mix of obscure tartans from defunct regiments, ones still used today for surviving regiments, tartans of overseas units that were "Highland" only in name, some that are now only associated with clans, and a number that are/were reserved for military pipe-band use and were not used in regular dress or undress uniforms. The exact history of all these tartans is unclear. E.g., Murray of Atholl tartan (yet another Black Watch variant, with a red over-check on green and on half the blue) is used by the reconstituted Atholl Highlanders today, and was recorded by the Highland Society of London as a clan tartan in 1816–22; but it may or may not have first been established for the original unit, Atholl's or Murray's Highlanders (77th Regiment of Foot), which was raised in 1777.)

Today, about a dozen tartans are officially used (and half a dozen more unofficially) between all of the surviving historical Scottish regiments, which have largely been amalgamated since 2006 as battalions into the Royal Regiment of Scotland, part of the Scottish, Welsh and Irish Division, though a few remain separate. (This is down from around 20 patterns before 2006.) There are some additional setts used by the British Army Reserves. These tartans are only worn in dress and pipe-band uniforms, after the practical uniform changes introduced in the early part of World War II, which did away with tartan kilts and trews in undress uniforms. Some military units in other countries also have their own tartans.

In 2006, the British Ministry of Defence sparked controversy when it allowed foreign woollen mills to bid for the government contracts to provide the tartans used by the Scottish troops (newly amalgamated as battalions into the Royal Regiment of Scotland), and lowered the formerly very high standards for the cloth. Borders MSP Jeremy Purvis claimed that quality and consistency would necessarily suffer.
