= Scuttlers (play) =

Play written by Rona Munro

Scuttlers is a stage production created by Rona Munro that depicts the 19th-century rivalry between street gangs in Manchester, England. While not strictly based on the exploits of real criminals, the drama is takes directly inspiration from the real-life criminal groups generically known as the 'scuttlers'. Set in 1895, the piece's plot follows the torn loyalties between members of the 'Bengal Street Tigers', who face a violent rivalry with the 'Prussia Street' gang as well as personal conflicts within their own group.

The play made its debut at the Royal Exchange Theatre on 5 February 2015. Wils Wilson, previously known for pieces such as Gastronauts and Praxis Makes Perfect, directed the production. The cast included performers Catriona Ennis, Chloe Harris, David Judge, Anna Krippa, and Rona Morison among others.

The production has received mixed to positive reviews from critics such as Lyn Gardner of The Guardian, who remarked that it featured "mills, thrills and soul", and Ian Shuttleworth of the Financial Times, who stated that it "fits in as many different vectors of relationship as a Shakespearean history play". Shuttleworth commented that he felt the audience does not "feel the seduction or the inevitability of the gang lifestyle", particularly its "unavoidable heavy cost". Yet he appreciated the "mechanistic, industrial power" of the stagecraft's depiction of Manchester city life.

Gardner additionally wrote:

Played out on Fly Davis's terrific design, which conjures the imprisoning daily grind of factory life, Wils Wilson's murky staging never makes 19th-century poverty look pretty. When it rains, the puddles are tinged with rusty blood. Even in their sleep these exhausted workers are endlessly doomed to repeat the physical actions of the mills where they toil. No wonder they long to make their mark outside on the streets where even the faceless nobody of the mill, just a cog in the industrial process, can become a somebody if they prove themselves tough enough to be in a gang.

== See also ==
- Crime in the United Kingdom
- Works by Rona Munro
