= Rona Munro =

Scottish writer (born 1959)

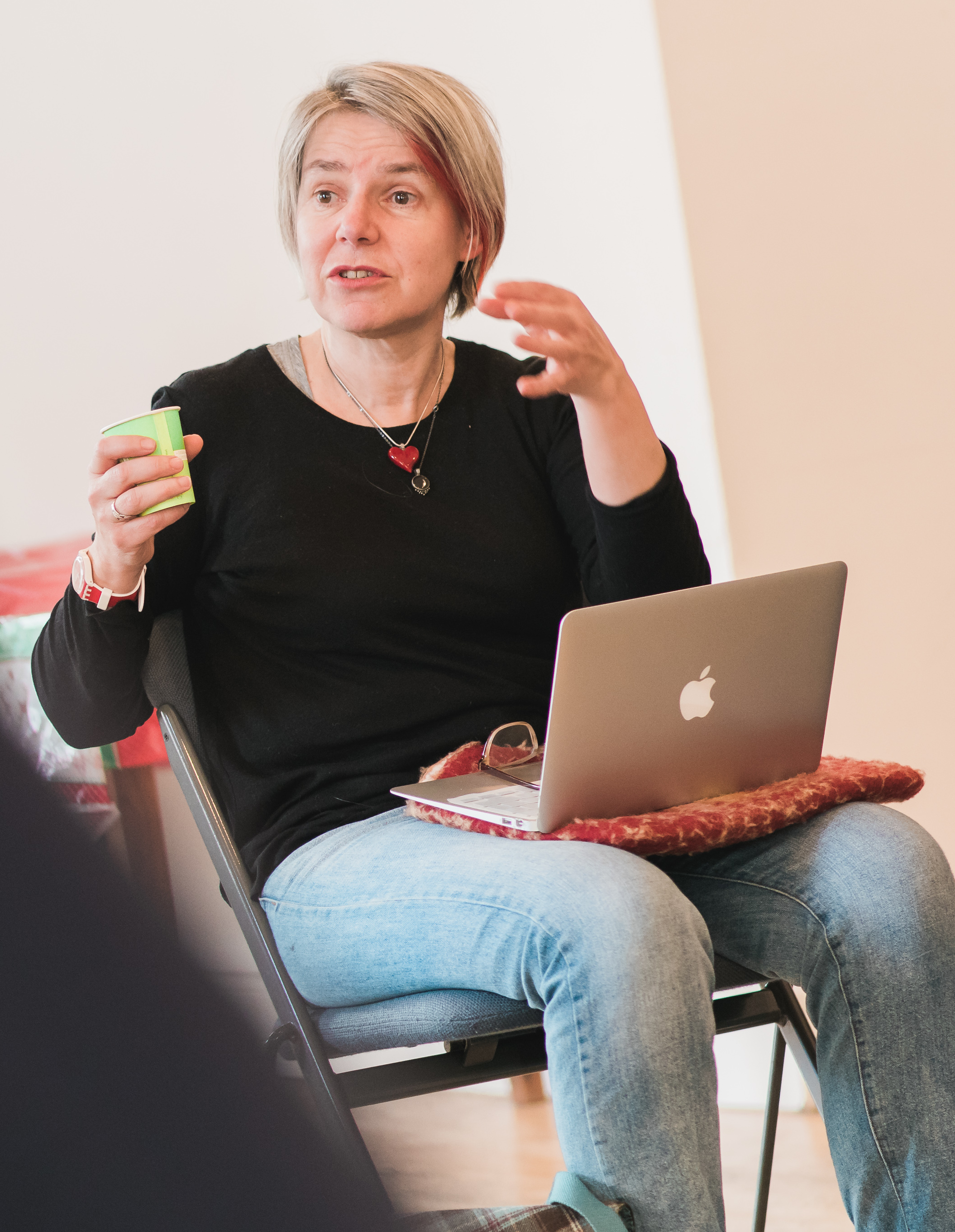
- Munro teaching at Playwrights' Studio Scotland in 2016
- Born: 7 September 1959 (age 67); Aberdeen, Scotland
- Occupations: Writer, playwright

Rona Munro (born 7 September 1959) is a Scottish writer for theatre, radio, television, and films. Her film work includes Ken Loach's Ladybird, Ladybird (1994), Oranges and Sunshine (2010) for Jim Loach, and Aimée & Jaguar (1999), co-authored by German director Max Färberböck.

== Early life ==
Munro went to school in Stonehaven and studied at the University of Edinburgh, where she wrote plays for the Television Society. After graduating in 1980, she was involved in the staging of the series of Women Live festivals at the Netherbow Theatre in Edinburgh.

== Career ==
Munro's first commissioned play was Fugue in 1983. This was followed in 1990 by Bold Girls, set during the Troubles in Northern Ireland, and Iron, first produced at the Traverse Theatre in Edinburgh in 2002 and staged many times worldwide. Her The Biggest Party in the World was staged by Craigmillar Youth Theatre in 1986.

In 1985, Munro was appointed writer-in-residence with the English theatre company Paines Plough, and her next four plays, Dust and Dreams (1986), The Way to Go Home (1987), Winners (1987) and Off the Road (1988) were produced in England. Her Saturday at the Commodore, commissioned by 7:84 for its Long Story Short series, was staged at Sabhal Mòr Ostaig, on Skye, in February 1989.

Munro's early television work included Survival (1989), the last serial of the original Doctor Who, and she returned to the show in 2017, writing "The Eaters of Light" for the tenth series of the revived version. This made her the only writer who has worked in both eras of Doctor Who. She later novelised both stories for the original and revived range of Target Books, respectively. She also wrote episodes of the BBC hospital drama series Casualty, and a BBC film, Rehab, directed by Antonia Bird.

Munro's history cycle The James Plays, James I, James II, and James III, were first performed by the National Theatre of Scotland in summer 2014 in a co-production with Edinburgh International Festival and the National Theatre. The plays were staged again in early 2016. She followed this up with James IV - The Queen of the Fight in 2022, which concentrated on the presence of two black women at his court. Other theatre work includes plays for the Traverse Theatre (Your Turn To Clean The Stair, Strawberries in January translation), Manchester Royal Exchange (Mary Barton, Scuttlers), Plymouth Drum Theatre and Paines Plough (Long Time Dead), and the Royal Shakespeare Company (The Indian Boy, The Astronaut's Chair). The James Plays were performed in the United States for the first time at Hillcrest High School in Midvale, Utah in early 2024.

Munro has also contributed eleven dramas to Radio 4's Stanley Baxter Playhouse: First Impressions, Wheeling Them In, The King's Kilt, Pasta Alfreddo at Cafe Alessandro, The Man in the Garden, The Porter's Story, The German Pilot, The Spider, The Showman, Meg's Tale, and The Flying Scotsman.

In 2006 the Lyric Theatre, Hammersmith presented Munro's adaptation of Richard Adams' classic book Watership Down.

Rona Munro currently lives and works in Scotland. Her play The Last Witch was performed at the 2009 Edinburgh Festival, directed by Dominic Hill, and in 2011 by Dumbarton People's Theatre. Pitlochry Festival Theatre's production, presented in association with Firebrand Theatre Company and directed by Richard Baron, toured Scotland in 2018. Also in 2018, a production of her adaptation of My Name Is Lucy Barton starring Laura Linney opened in London.

Her James V: Katherine, a drama about Katherine Hamilton, sister of the Protestant martyr Patrick Hamilton, with Catriona Faint in the title role, was toured in 2024.

== Personal life ==
Munro is the second cousin (once removed) of Scottish author Angus MacVicar.

== Awards ==
- Giles Cooper Award for Dirt Under The Carpet, 1988
- Susan Smith Blackburn Prize, 1991
- Evening Standard Award, NOOK Award for Best Play for The James Plays, 2014
- Writers' Guild of Great Britain Award, Best Play for The James Plays, 2014

== Works ==
=== Plays ===
- The Bang and the Whimper, 1982
- The Salesman, 1982
- Fugue, 1983
- Bus, 1984
- Touchwood, 1984
- Ghost Story, 1985
- Piper's Cave, 1985
- Watching Waiters, 1985
- Biggest Party in the World, 1986
- Dust And Dreams, 1986
- The Way To Go Home, 1987
- Winners, 1987
- Off The Road, 1988
- Long Story Short, 1989
- Saturday at the Commodore, 1989
- Bold Girls, 1990
- Scotland Matters, 1992
- Your Turn To Clean The Stair, 1992
- Haunted, 1999
- Federico García Lorca (1999). The House of Bernarda Alba [Rona Munro]. Nick Hern Books. ISBN 978-1-85459-459-4.
- Snake, 1999
- Iron. Nick Hern Books. 2002. ISBN 978-1-85459-703-8.
- Stick Granny on the Roofrack, 2002
- Gilt, 2003
- Catch A Falling Star!, 2004
- Women on the Verge of a T Junction, 2004
- Indian Boy, 2006
- Long Time Dead, 2006
- The Maiden Stone, 2006
- Mary Barton, 2006
- Strawberries in January, (translation) 2006
- Watership Down, 2006
- Dirt Under The Carpet, 2007
- The Last Witch, 2009
- Little Eagles, 2011
- The Astronaut's Chair, 2012
- Donny's Brain, 2012
- The James Plays, 2014
  - James I: The Key Will Keep the Lock
  - James II: Day of the Innocents
  - James III: The True Mirror
- Scuttlers, 2015
- Rebus: Long Shadows, 2018
- My Name Is Lucy Barton, 2018
- Mary Shelley's Frankenstein, 2019
- James IV: Queen of the Fight, based on the life of the courtier Ellen More, 2022
- Mary, based on the life of Mary Stuart, 2022
- James V: Katherine, 2024

=== Screen ===
- Doctor Who, "Survival" (1989)
- Casualty, Say It with Flowers (1990)
- Ladybird, Ladybird (1994)
- Aimée & Jaguar (1999)
- Oranges and Sunshine (2010)
- Doctor Who, "The Eaters of Light" (2017)
