= Scuttle =

Scuttle may refer to:

- Scuttling, the deliberate sinking of one's own ship
- Scuttle or sidescuttle, a synonym for a porthole, a circular window in a ship.
- Coal scuttle, a bucket-like container for coal
- Shaving scuttle, a teapot-like container for hot water
- Scuttle (The Little Mermaid), a fictional character
- Scuttle (software), web-based collaborative bookmarking software
- Scuttle, the bulkhead in a vehicle between the engine and the driver and passengers
- Scuttle shake, a phenomenon experienced in some convertible cars
- Scuttle (Disney), a character in Disney's Mickey Mouse comics
- Scuttle (horse)

== See also ==
- Scuttler (disambiguation)
- Scuttlebutt
