= Gormshuil Mhòr na Maighe =

16th-century Scottish witch

- Born: Isle of Skye or Lochaber, Scotland
- Era: 16th century
- Known for: Supernatural powers, often called a "witch"

Gormshuil Mhòr na Maighe (also called Gormla of Moy; fl. 16th century) was a powerful Gaelic Scottish woman, reputed to be a witch, from the Lochaber Highlands of Scotland. She is often referred to as the Great Gormula. Associated with many stories, she is best known for her interactions with Ewen Mor Cameron of Lochiel, 13th chief of Clan Cameron, and for the mysterious sinking of a Spanish galleon of the Spanish Armada off the Isle of Mull, which she is held responsible for.

== Legendary background ==
Born a Cameron of Moy, she married a MacKinnon originally from the Isle of Skye but was later widowed. Gormshuil, which means 'the blue-eyed one' in Gaelic, was known for her supernatural powers and striking beauty. Fishermen and hunters in Lochaber would often seek her blessing. There are many stories about Gormshuil, also called Gormla, a Gaelic name that was often used to describe witches.

The most quoted story about Gormshuil tells of the warning she gave to her Clan Chief, Ewen Cameron of Lochiel who was passing by on his way to confront the Earl of Atholl about a border dispute between Lochaber and Perthshire. At first, he ignored Gormshuil but she told him to return home to get his men. He should take them with him and keep them hidden and if he needed them he was to turn his coat inside out. Lochiel took her advice and although Atholl too had men lying in wait, he was able to defeat them. The interaction between Lochiel and Atholl went as follows: "We shall set the border here", said Lochiel. Lord Atholl said: "Back, back, back a good piece yet", said he. Lochiel said he would not go back. Atholl said to him: "Back – I implore you go back." "I will not go back", said Lochiel. Lord Atholl, outraged, lifted his hand and men came along a slope. Lochiel asked: "What is that?" Lord Atholl replied: "The Atholl wethers coming to graze the Lochaber grass." At this Lochiel took his coat off and turned it, and his warriors came charging from along the slope. Lord Atholl asked: "What is that!" Lochiel replied: "The hounds of Lochaber coming to eat the flesh of the Atholl wethers."

This dispute between Lochiel and Atholl led to the Cameron clan's motto 'Sons of the hounds, come hither and get flesh!' It is also said that this came from the tune Lochiel's piper was playing at the time, Thigibh an seo, chlanna nan con, is gheibh sibh feoil, ('Come hither, children of the hounds, and you'll get flesh'). Afterwards, although Cameron thanked Gormshuil on his way home, she replied that "Despite your words of kindness you will hang my son some day."

Many years later, Gormshuil's only son was charged with murder. However, on her way to see Ewen at Tor Castle to beg for her son's life, Gormshuil drowned. She was said to have fallen into a flooded burn after spotting a salmon; it is believed that this salmon was in fact the Devil luring her to death. Adding to the tragedy, Ewen indeed had her son executed without knowing he was Gormshuil's. However, there were many different interpretations of her death.

== See also ==
- Circe
- Janet Horne – another Scottish woman only known by a generic name for a witch
- Witchcraft
