= Bengal Tigers =

Bengal tigers (Panthera tigris tigris) are a subspecies of the tiger family.

Bengal tigers may also refer to:

- Bengal Tigers (band), an Australian heavy metal band
- Royal Leicestershire Regiment, a line infantry regiment of the British Army
- Bengal Tigers, a cricket team in the Indian Celebrity Cricket League
- Bengal Tigers, a cricket team in the T10 League

== See also ==
- Bengal tiger (disambiguation)
- Cincinnati Bengals—American football team of the NFL
