= Raids of Urquhart =

- Part of Clan Cameron and Clan Grant feud
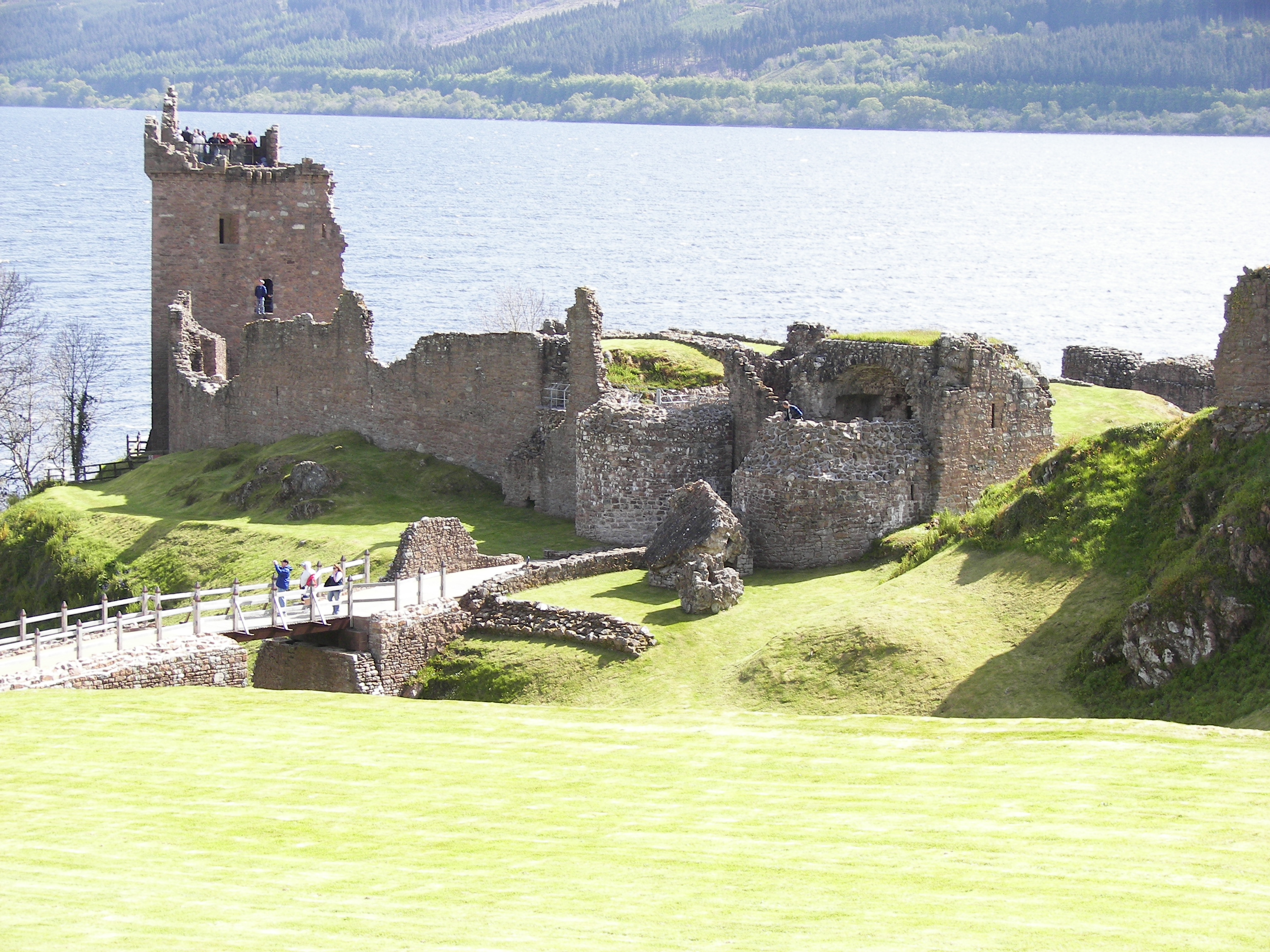
- Ruins of Urquhart Castle
Date	October 1544 and April 1545
Location	Urquhart Castle, Glen Urquhart and Glenmoriston, Scottish Highlands
Result	Clan Cameron victory

Belligerents
Clan Cameron; Clan MacDonell of Glengarry	Clan Grant

Commanders and leaders
Ewen Cameron of Lochiel	

The Raids of Urquhart were two raids carried out in the vicinity of Urquhart Castle in the Scottish Highlands in October 1544 and April 1545 where a large amount of cattle, horses, harvest, furniture and military equipment were stolen from the Clan Grant, a Highland Scottish clan, by the Clan Cameron and Clan MacDonell of Glengarry, both also Scottish Highland clans.

== Background ==
The raids took place in the aftermath of the Battle of the Shirts which itself took place in July 1544 where the Clan Cameron and Clan Macdonald of Clanranald had defeated the Clan Fraser of Lovat who had been supported by the Clan Grant and the Clan Mackintosh.

== The raids ==
Ewen Cameron of Lochiel, chief of Clan Cameron, and MacDonald of Glengarry made expeditions to the Grant's lands of Glenmoriston and Glen Urquhart where the Grants held Urquhart Castle. Among the goods taken were two hundred bolls of oats, with fodder; one hundred bolls of bere; one hundred cows; one hundred calves; forty young cows; ten one year-old stirks; eight horses and four mares; four young horses; one hundred and forty ewes; sixty gimmers and dinmonts; one hundred lambs.

From Urquhart Castle, were stolen; twelve beds, with bolsters, blankets and sheets; five posts; six pans; one basket and one chest which contained three hundred pounds in money; two brewing cauldrons; twenty pieces of artillery; ten stands of harness; and several other items of considerable value including doors; bedsteads, chairs and boats. According to Mackenzie, the large number of goods taken shows that the people of Glen Urquhart were "very well-to-do in those days".

== Aftermath ==
Summonses were issued under the royal signet dated 3 August 1546 against Cameron of Lochiel and his coadjutors. According to Mackenzie, the raids probably helped secure the conviction and execution of Ewen Cameron of Lochiel in 1547. However, the principal charge against him was his part taken in the Battle of the Shirts, and of having supported the Earl of Lennox.
