= Ewen Mor Cameron of Lochiel =

Ewen Mór Cameron of Lochiel (died 1547) was the 13th Chief of Clan Cameron in Lochaber.

== Biography ==
Ewen MacAllan Cameron was the son of Allan Cameron of Lochiel, 12th Chief (died 1480) and his wife Marion MacDonald, daughter of MacDonald of Keppoch.

In 1494, Lochiel submitted to James IV and was in "great favour" with the King. At court the following year, on 24 October 1495, he procured a conformation of the charters of Cameron lands in Lochaber and Ross. He led the clan at the Battle of Flodden in 1513, only just managing to escape with a small band of his warriors back to Lochaber after the defeat. The feud between Clan Cameron and Clan Mackintosh was particularly violent during this period.

A border dispute between the Cameron territories in Lochaber and the Earl of Atholl's lands in Perthshire led to a famous incident. Lochiel had set out for the rendezvous where he would meet the Earl of Atholl and come to terms. However, on his way to Lord Atholl he met the witch Gormshuil Mhòr na Maighe (Gormla of Moy). Gormshuil was famed in the West Highlands for her supernatural powers. She informed him that he must not go to Lord Atholl because she had foreseen his treachery. Lochiel took her advice and went back to gather his best warriors, have them hidden and if needed, he was to turn his coat inside out. Though Lord Atholl too had men lying in wait to ambush, Lochiel was able to defeat them. This led to the Clan Cameron war cry: Chlanna nan con thigibh a' so 's gheibh sibh feòil ("sons of the hounds, come hither and get flesh!").

In 1547, Lochiel was executed by the Earl of Huntly for high treason for his part in the Battle of the Shirts, the Raids of Urquhart and being implicated in Lennox's revolt in 1546. He was succeeded in the chiefdom by his grandson.

== Family ==
Ewen Mor married the daughter of Celestine MacDonald of Lochalsh, in turn son of Alexander of Islay, Lord of the Isles. With his first wife he had one son, Donald, who predeceased his father, but had two sons himself: Ewen Beag, 14th Chief and Donald Dubh, 15th Chief, from whence the Lochiel branch continued. He married, secondly, Marjory Mackintosh, daughter of the chief of Clan Mackintosh (as part of a peace treaty), and their son was the progenitor of the Cameron of Erracht branch of Clan Cameron. He also had several illegitimate children, including Allan and a daughter, Evere.

== See also ==
- Chiefs of Clan Cameron
- Gormshuil Mhòr na Maighe
