= St Michael's Flags and Angel Meadow Park =

Park in Manchester

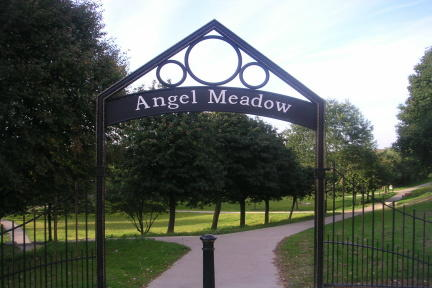
- Interactive map of St Michael's Flags and Angel Meadow Park
- Type: Municipal park
- Location: Manchester, England
- Coordinates: 53°29′21″N 2°14′8″W
- Area: 7.4 acres (3.0 ha)
- Created: 2004
- Operator: Manchester City Council
- Website: Friends of Angel Meadow

St Michael's Flags and Angel Meadow Park is a public park in Manchester, England, to the immediate northeast of the city centre, on a slope between the River Irk and Rochdale Road. It occupies an area of 7.4 acres (3 ha), and was once an affluent suburb, until the 19th-century Industrial Revolution altered the social standing of the area and introduced poverty and disease. Regeneration of the park in the 2000s has created a gateway into the Irk Valley.

== History ==
St Michael and All Angels' church was built in 1788 by Humphrey Owen to seat just over a thousand people. Its foundation stone was laid on 20 May 1788 and it was consecrated on 23 July 1789. Almost twenty years later in 1808, a letter appeared in the Manchester Guardian declaring "Why one of the ugliest churches in Manchester situated in one of the most crowded and notorious parts of the City, should have so long enjoyed the pleasant sounding name 'St Michael's, Angel Meadow' is beyond understanding".

The land adjacent to the church became the largest cemetery in Manchester, used for the interment of those who had no family place of burial or were too poor to afford a proper funeral. The population density of Angel Meadow in the mid-19th century was in excess of 350 per acre, and as social and living conditions worsened some resorted to digging up the cemetery and selling its soil as fertilizer to nearby farmers. The situation became so bad that the Burial Act 1855 (18 & 19 Vict. c. 128) was passed to cover up graveyards with flagstones, hence the name St Michael's Flags. It has been estimated that 40,000 people were buried here.

In 1844, the Oldham Road terminus of the Manchester–Leeds Railway was abandoned and the line extended through Collyhurst to a new link station at Hunts Bank – the first Victoria Station. A railway viaduct traversed Angel Meadow, whilst the obnoxious smells from the Irk and Irwell and the Gould street gas works darkened the landscape.

The mixture was ladled further by aromas from the tannery, the dyeworks, the iron foundry, the brewery, the tripe works and rotting vegetation from the Smithfield market, all added together with the neighborhood’s fried fish and bad sanitation smells, one would agree that the cauldron of Angel Meadow was indeed a potent brew.

— James Stanhope-Brown, Angels from the Meadow

Ragged schools, such as Charter Street and Sharp Street, and other institutes for abandoned, destitute and neglected children, flourished in the area:

Each winter, thousands of poor, helpless children are provided with food, clogs and clothing; and every Sunday morning during the season, hundreds of destitute men and women are served with breakfast; and we try, by God’s help and the bestowal of a word of comfort and cheer, to arouse in them a feeling of hope which may lead them to a higher and noble life.

— Ellen Casey, Christmas Appeal 1901 by Thomas Johnson

Alexis de Tocqueville, a French political thinker and historian, best known for his Democracy in America (two volumes: 1835 and 1840) and The Old Regime and the Revolution (1856), explored the effects of the rising inequalities in social conditions on the individual and the state in western societies; he visited Manchester in 1835, describing it in his work of the same year Journeys to England And Ireland.

Friedrich Engels was born in 1820 as the son of a successful German industrialist. As a young man his father sent him to England to help manage his cotton factory in Salford. Engels was shocked by the poverty in the city and began writing an account that was published as the Condition of the Working Classes in England (1844). His account, of what he labeled the "Irish town", includes a graphic description of the pauper burial ground at St. Michael's Flags. Engels later collaborated with Karl Marx, which resulted in the Communist Manifesto.

The Flags became known for hosting prostitutes, street entertainers, Cock fights and bare knuckle brawls, with gathered crowds gambling on the competitions, in the second half of the 19th century. Territorial gangs, of adolescent Scuttlers, fought for the control of the neighbouring streets, while numerous pawn shops and marine stores fenced items pickpocketed or robbed by the street gangs, and beer shops offered an illicit potato derived spirit, known as poteen.

St Michael's Church, graveyard, and surrounding streets regularly featured in the paintings of L. S. Lowry.

St Michael's Church closed in 1930 and the site was sold on condition that the church building was demolished. Demolition was carried out in 1935. In 1940 Angel Meadow was subject to German bombing.

== Regeneration ==
Friends of Angel Meadow (FOAM) was formed in 2004 to campaign for the regeneration of the park and to research the history of the area. Over £200,000 was raised through grants and match funding, which was spent re-landscaping the park, installing street furniture including seating and bins, erecting four solar-powered street lights, an arched entrance way and planting wildflowers.

A Local Heritage Grant of £24,000 paid for six history boards and the publication of an information booklet.

In the spring of 2006, the park hosted the BBC and Manchester Leisure's Springwatch Festival of Nature. Since 2006 it has attained Green Flag Award status, the national award for green spaces in England and Wales.

On 1 May 2010, the park was used as a location by artist Spencer Tunick for his installation Everyday People, part of The Lowry's 10th Anniversary celebration.

Oxford Archaeology carried out excavations around the park in 2009, 2012 and 2019, revealing the basements of homes and business in the area from the 1800s.

The Royal Geographical Society Discovering Britain series of walks: Slums, Squalor and Salvation guides people around the park and wider neighbourhood.

In August 2012, BBC television broadcast scenes of the area as part of Michael Wood's The Great British Story: A People's History (Episode 8 Industry & Empire).

A second phase of funding for the park has been secured and work should be completed by early summer 2014. This work will include repairing the Aspin Lane wall and opening up the steps into the park, often referred to as the Lowry Steps (as L S Lowry depicted them in several of his works).

The Co-operative Group is also funding a significant programme of work in 2015 to rebuild the front entrance and improve the whole park overall. This is being funded from the grant given to The Co-operative from the European Regional Development Fund to create the NOMA district of Manchester city centre.
