= Janet Horne =

British alleged witch

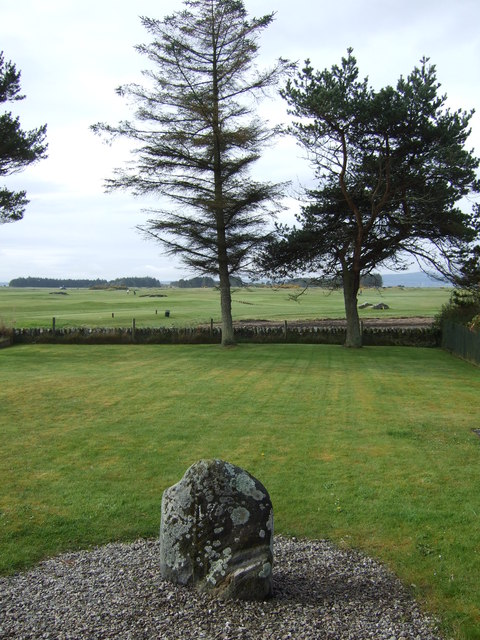
- The Witch's Stone in Dornoch, marking the spot of her execution
- Died: June 1727; Dornoch, Scotland
- Cause of death: Burned alive
- Monuments: The Witch's Stone in Littletown, Dornoch.
- Known for: Last person to be executed legally for witchcraft in the British Isles

Janet Horne (died 1727) was the last person to be executed legally for witchcraft in the British Isles.

Horne and her daughter were arrested in Dornoch in Sutherland and imprisoned on the accusations of her neighbours. Horne was showing signs of senility, and her daughter had a deformity of her hands and feet. The neighbours accused Horne of having used her daughter as a pony to ride to the Devil, where she had her shod by him. The trial was conducted very quickly; the sheriff, Captain David Ross, had judged both guilty and sentenced them to be burned at the stake. The daughter managed to escape, but Janet was stripped, smeared with tar, paraded through the town on a barrel and burned alive. Nine years after her death the witchcraft acts were repealed in Scotland.

Janet (or Jenny) Horne was also a generic name for witches in the north of Scotland at the time and this makes it difficult to determine what the real name of this woman may have been. Contemporary writers may have called her 'Janet Horne' simply because her real name was unknown or because the name was reported as 'Janet Horne' and they were unaware that this was a generic name. Some sources give the date of the Dornoch execution as June 1722.

== Legacy ==
The Witch's Stone in Littletown, Dornoch, marks the alleged spot of Horne's execution.

She is the subject of the play The Last Witch by Rona Munro, which premiered at the 2009 Edinburgh International Festival and was part of the 2018 summer season at Pitlochry Festival Theatre.

In 2023 there was an exhibition of thirteen figures, Witches in Words, not Deeds, created by Carolyn Sutton. Horne was one of the figures exhibited at Edinburgh's Central Library.

The 2023 novel The Last Witch of Scotland by Philip Paris is inspired by the story of Janet Horne. The novel is described as a "gripping and moving story which runs along fast and persuasively". It is the recipient of the 2024 Waterstones Book of the Year award in the Scottish section.

== See also ==
- Bideford witch trial – last confirmed executions for witchcraft in England
- Gormshuil Mhòr na Maighe – another Scottish woman only known by a generic name for a witch
