= Cameron of Erracht =

Minor noble Scottish family

The Camerons of Erracht were a minor noble Scottish family and a branch of the Clan Cameron, a Highland Scottish clan. In Scottish Gaelic they are known as the Sliochd Eòghain mhic Eòghain (the children of Ewen, son of Ewen).

== History ==
=== Origins ===
The progenitor of the family of Cameron of Erracht was Ewen Cameron (fl. 16th century), son of Ewen Mor Cameron, XIII of Lochiel, chief of Clan Cameron by his second wife Marjory Mackintosh, grand-daughter of Malcolm Beg Mackintosh, X of Mackintosh. Ewen's son was John Dow M'Ewen V'Ewen Cameron, 2nd of Erracht who was executed in around 1585 for the murder of Donald Dubh Cameron, XV Chief of Clan Cameron, in 1569. John Bodach M'Iain V'Ewen Cameron, 3rd of Erracht was also executed on the orders of Cameron of Lochiel in 1613.

=== Jacobite risings ===
Donald Cameron, 7th of Erracht was born shortly before the Jacobite rising of 1715. Thirty years later during the Jacobite rising of 1745 he joined Cameron of Lochiel and was second in command at the historic Glenfinnan gathering.

After the Jacobite defeat at the Battle of Culloden, Cameron of Erracht was a homeless warrior in the mountains for three years. He had three children, the eldest of whom was Sir Alan Cameron of Erracht K.C.B.

=== Sir Alan Cameron of Erracht ===
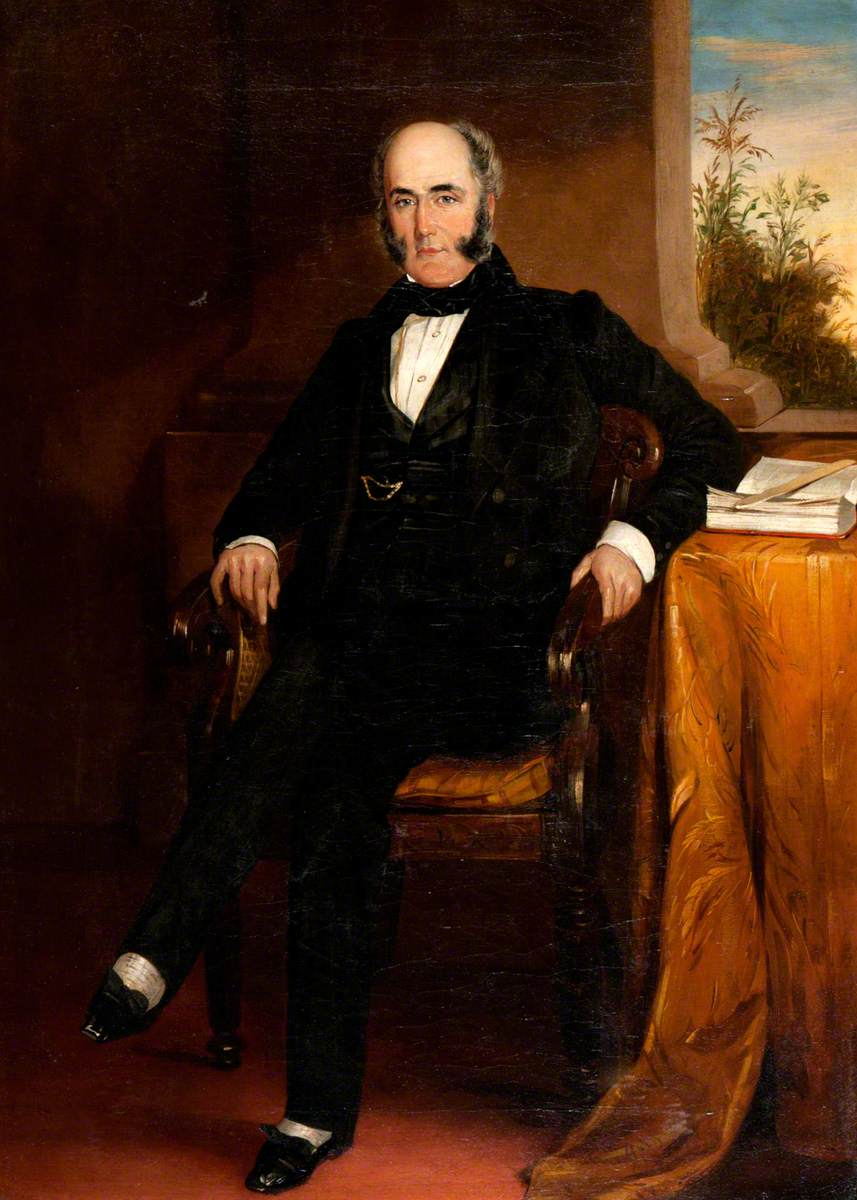
Alan Cameron of Erracht, founder of the regiment

Sir Alan Cameron of Erracht raised the 79th or Cameron Highlanders in 1793. He was appointed Lieutenant-Colonel Commandant and led the regiment through the severe campaigns in Flanders from 1794 to 1795. In 1797 the regiment was broken up and two hundred and ten men joined the Black Watch regiment. In 1798 Cameron of Erracht raised a second 79th regiment that was seven hundred and eighty strong and after taking part in many engagements he died in 1828 in Fulham.

=== Captain Ludovick Cameron ===
Captain Ludovick Duncombe-Jewell Cameron (born Richard Jewell; 1866–1947) was a writer and Cornish-language enthusiast who lived in Kent. In 1904 he assumed the surname Cameron when he married his second wife, Janet Sarah Bruce, daughter of Gen. Robert Bruce of Glendouglie. Although he claimed to be the chieftain of Cameron of Erracht, he died without having been able to establish his claim.

== Tartan ==
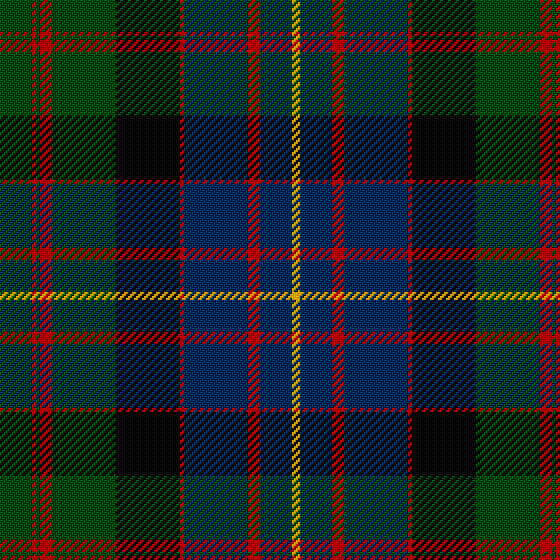
Cameron of Erract tartan, originally designed for the 79th Cameron Highlanders raised by Alan Cameron of Erracht in 1793

The Cameron of Erracht tartan was specially designed by Mrs Cameron of Erracht and is thought to have been based on an old Lochaber sett which itself had actually been based on old MacDonald overlordship.

== See also ==
- Clan Cameron
- Chiefs of Clan Cameron
