= Scuttlers =

Members of neighbourhood-based youth gangs formed in Manchester, England

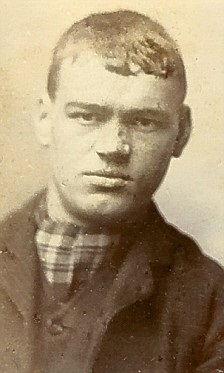
Scuttler arrested in 1890

Scuttlers were members of neighbourhood-based youth gangs (known as scuttling gangs) formed in working class areas of Manchester, Salford, and the surrounding townships during the late 19th century. It is possible to draw parallels with the London street gangs at the same time period, whose behaviour was labelled hooliganism. The social commentator Alexander Devine attributed the gang culture to lack of parental control, lack of discipline in schools, "base literature" and the monotony of life in Manchester's slums.

Gangs were formed throughout the slums of central Manchester, in the townships of Bradford, Gorton and Openshaw to the east and in Salford, to the west of the city. Gang conflicts erupted in Manchester in the early 1870s and went on sporadically for 30 years, declining in frequency and severity by the late 1890s.

== Dress ==
Scuttlers distinguished themselves from other young men in working-class neighbourhoods by their distinctive clothing. They generally wore a uniform of brass-tipped pointed clogs, bell-bottomed trousers, cut like a sailor's ("bells" that measured fourteen inches round the knee and twenty-one inches round the foot) and "flashy" silk scarves. Their hair was cut short at the back and sides, but they grew long fringes, known as "donkey fringes", that were longer on the left side and plastered down on the forehead over the left eye. Peaked caps were also worn tilted to the left to display the fringe. The scuttlers' girlfriends also had a distinctive style of dress consisting of clogs, shawl, and a vertically striped skirt.

== Clashes ==
A scuttler is a lad, usually between the ages of 14 and 18, or even 19, and scuttling consists of the fighting of two opposed bands of youths, who are armed with various weapons.

— Alexander Devine, Scuttlers and Scuttling: Their Prevention and Cure. (Manchester, 1890)

Scuttling gangs were territorial fighting gangs, as reflected in their names; the Bengal Tigers came from the cluster of streets and courts off Bengal Street in Ancoats, the Meadow Lads from Angel Meadow. Most gangs took their names from a local thoroughfare, such as Holland Street, Miles Platting, Grey Mare Lane, Bradford, or Hope Street, Salford. Gang members fought with a variety of weapons, but they all carried knives and wore heavy buckled belts, often decorated with pictures such as serpents, scorpions, hearts pierced with arrows or women's names. The thick leather belts were their most prized possessions and were wrapped tightly around the wrist at the onset of a "scuttle", so that the buckle could be used to strike at opponents. The use of knives and belts was designed to maim and disfigure rather than to kill.

Some of the clashes between rival gangs involved large numbers; the Gorton Reporter described one such instance in May 1879 as involving more than 500 people. Scuttling reached a peak in 1890–91; it was said that by 1890 more youths were held in Strangeways Prison for scuttling than for any other offence.

== Demise ==
By the turn of the century the gangs had all but died out owing to some of the worst slums having been cleared, the setting up of Working Lads' Clubs (such as Salford Lads' Club) to engage the working youths in more peaceful activities, the spread of street football and the advent of the cinema.

One initiative to provide an alternative to gang warfare resulted in the formation of St Marks (West Gorton) Football Club, which later became Manchester City FC. In 1997 the Manchester historian Gary James highlighted that scuttling was the number one unifying activity of young men, and that the creation of St Mark's Football Club was a very serious attempt at diverting the young men of West Gorton into more worthwhile activities. Anna Connell, perceived by many as the founder of St Mark's FC, also helped create men's meetings, a library, and other society improving facilities and clubs.

== See also ==
- History of Manchester
- Peaky Blinders
- Teddy boys
