= Donald Cameron =

Donald Cameron may refer to:

== Scottish Clan Cameron ==
- Donald Dubh Cameron (fl. 1411), first authentic chief of Clan Cameron
- Donald Cameron of Lochiel (c. 1695 or 1700–1748), 19th Chief, and his descendants:
  - Donald Cameron, 22nd Lochiel (1769–1832), 22nd Chief
  - Donald Cameron, 23rd Lochiel (1796–1859), 23rd Chief
  - Donald Cameron of Lochiel (1835–1905), Scottish Conservative politician
  - Donald Walter Cameron of Lochiel (1876–1951), 25th Chief
  - Donald Hamish Cameron of Lochiel (1910–2004), 26th Chief
  - Donald Angus Cameron of Lochiel (1946–2023), 27th Chief
  - Donald Cameron, Baron Cameron of Lochiel (born 1976), 28th Chief, Conservative member of the Scottish Parliament and life peer
- Taillear Dubh na Tuaighe (c. 1550–?), Donald Cameron, illegitimate son of 13th chief; descendants are members of Taylor sept

== Australian politicians ==
- Donald Cameron (Tasmanian politician) (1814–1890), Tasmanian MLC 1868–86, father of Donald Norman Cameron
- Donald Alastair Cameron (1900–1974), Liberal Party of Australia MHR for Oxley, Queensland, 1949–1961
- Donald Charles Cameron (politician) (1879–1960), Nationalist Party of Australia MHR for Brisbane, Queensland, 1919–1931, United Australia Party MHR for Lilley, Queensland, 1934–1937
- Donald Keith Cameron (1887–1967), Nationalist Party of Australia Tasmanian MHA for Wilmot, Tasmania, 1934–1937, son of Donald Norman Cameron
- Don Cameron (Queensland Labor politician) (Donald James Cameron, 1917–1964), Australian Labor Party MHR for Lilley, Queensland, 1961–1963
- Donald Milner Cameron (born 1940), Liberal Party of Australia MHR for Griffith, Queensland, 1966–1977, for Fadden, Queensland, 1977–1983, for Moreton, Queensland, 1983–1990
- Don Cameron (South Australian politician) (Donald Newton Cameron, 1914–1998), Australian Labor Party Senator for South Australia, 1969–1978
- Don Cameron (Victorian politician) (Donald James Cameron, 1878–1962), Australian Labor Party Senator for Victoria, 1938–1962
- Norman Cameron (politician) (Donald Norman Cameron, 1851–1931), Free Trade Party MHR for Tasmania 1901–1903, for Wilmot, Tasmania, 1904–1906

== Canadian politicians ==
- Donald Cameron Sr. (1869–1936), member of the Alberta Legislative Assembly, 1921–1935
- Donald Cameron (Alberta politician) (1901–1989), senator from Alberta and the son of Donald Cameron Sr.
- Donald Cameron (Prince Edward Island politician) (c. 1836–after 1882), member of the Legislative Assembly
- Donald Mackenzie Cameron (1843–1920), Scottish-born merchant, journalist and political figure in Ontario, Canada
- Donald Niel Cameron (1917–2014), member of parliament from British Columbia
- Donald Cameron (Nova Scotia premier) (1946–2021), premier of Nova Scotia
- Don Cameron (Saskatchewan politician), Green Party of Canada candidate from Saskatchewan

== Other politicians ==
- J. Donald Cameron (1833–1918), United States senator from Pennsylvania
- Donald Charles Cameron (colonial administrator) (1872–1948), governor of Nigeria and Tanganyika
- Donald Cameron (mayor) (1877–1962), mayor of Dunedin, New Zealand

== Entertainment ==
- Angus Cameron (publisher) (Donald Angus Cameron, 1908–2002), American book editor and publisher
- Donald Clough Cameron (1905–1954), American novelist and comic book writer
- D. J. Cameron (Donald John Cameron, 1933–2016), New Zealand journalist and sportswriter
- Silver Donald Cameron (1937–2020), Canadian author and educator
- Robin Bryans (1928–2005), Belfast-born writer also known as Donald Cameron
- Donald Cameron (EastEnders), a character in British soap opera EastEnders

== Sports ==
- Donald Cameron (cricketer) (1908–1990), New Zealand cricketer
- Donald Cameron (rugby union, born 1887) (1887–1947), rugby player from New Zealand
- Donald Cameron (rugby union, born 1927) (1927–2003), rugby union player from Scotland
- Don Cameron (footballer) (born 1931), Australian footballer for Melbourne
- Gregory Duncan Cameron, known as Don, racehorse trainer
- Donald Cameron (water polo) (born 1954), Australian water polo player

== Other ==
- Donald Cameron (architect) (1894–1972), Scottish architect
- Donald Ewen Cameron (1901–1967), Scottish-American psychiatrist
- Donald Cameron (VC) (1916–1961), Victoria Cross recipient in 1943
- Donald Cameron (bishop) (born 1926), in the Anglican Diocese of Sydney
- Don Cameron (balloonist) (born 1939), British balloon manufacturer
- Donald Cameron, the captain of Air Canada Flight 797

== See also ==
- Cameron (surname)
