= David Cameron (disambiguation) =

David Cameron (born 1966) is a British politician who served as Prime Minister of the United Kingdom from 2010 to 2016.

David Cameron may also refer to:

== Sports ==
=== Football ===
- David Cameron (Australian footballer) (born 1964), Australian rules footballer
- David Cameron (footballer, born 1895) (1895–1953), Scottish footballer
- David Cameron (footballer, born 1902), Scottish footballer
- David Cameron (footballer, born 1936) (1936–2006), Scottish footballer
- Dave Cameron (footballer) (born 1975), Welsh footballer and manager

=== Other sports ===
- Dave Cameron (ice hockey) (born 1958), Canadian ice hockey player
- David Cameron (darts player) (born 1969), Canadian darts player
- Dave Cameron (administrator) (born 1971), West Indies Cricket Board president, 2013–present
- David Cameron (rower) (born 1974), Australian rower
- Dave Cameron (baseball analyst) (born 1980), sports journalist

== Legal ==
- David Cameron (jurist) (1804–1872), first Chief Justice of the Crown Colony of Vancouver Island

== Art and entertainment ==
- David Young Cameron (1865–1945), Scottish painter and etcher
- David Cameron (Australian actor), Australian actor
- David Cameron (Queer as Folk), a character on Queer as Folk

== See also ==
Donald Cameron
