= Donald Cameron, Baron Cameron of Lochiel =

Scottish politician (born 1976)

The Right Honourable The Lord Cameron of Lochiel
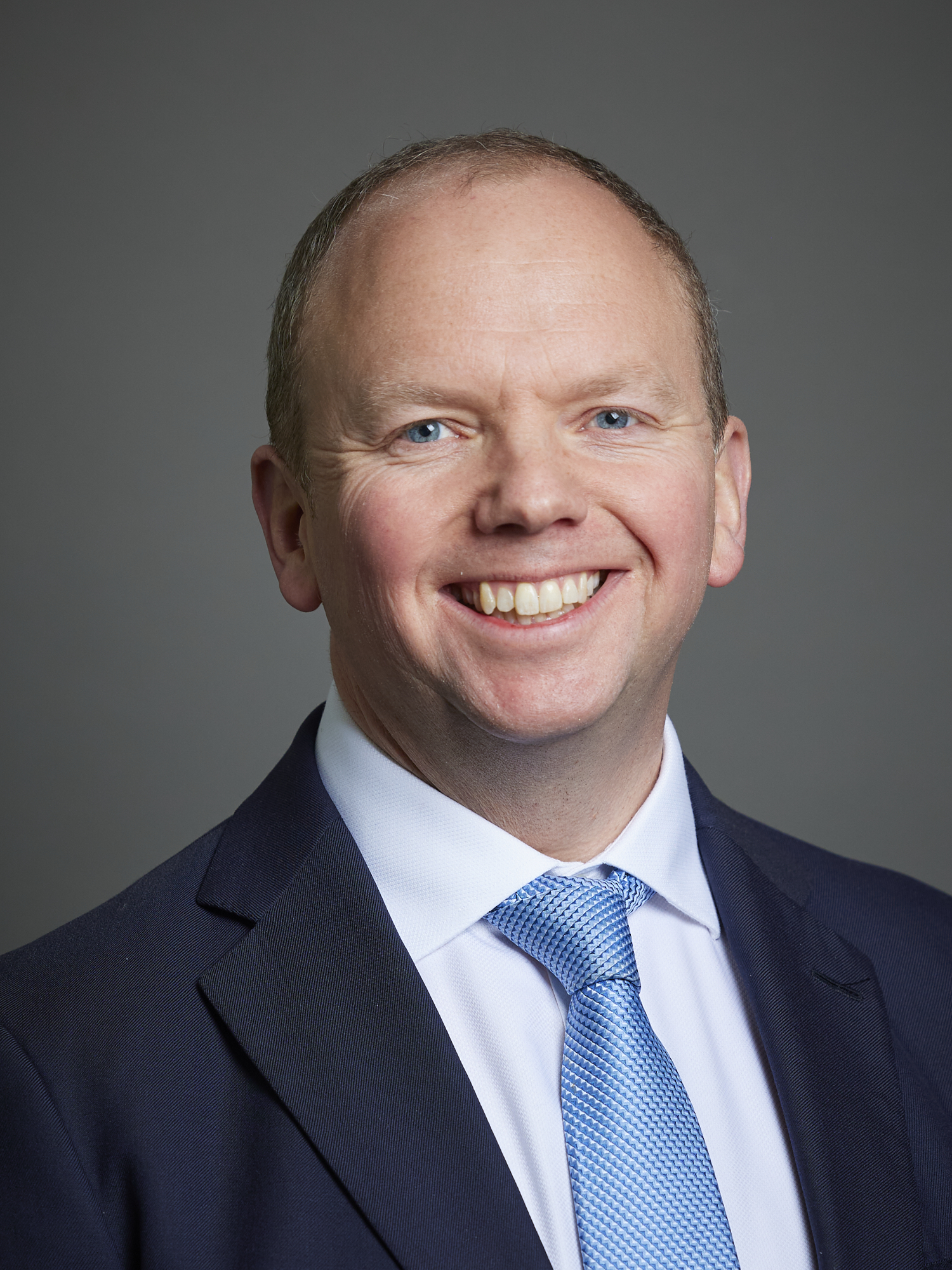
- Official portrait, 2024

Parliamentary Under-Secretary of State for Scotland
- In office 9 February 2024 – 5 July 2024 Serving with John Lamont
- Prime Minister: Rishi Sunak
- Preceded by: The Lord Offord of Garvel
- Succeeded by: Kirsty McNeill

Member of the House of Lords
- Lord Temporal
- Life peerage 4 March 2024

Member of the Scottish Parliament for Highlands and Islands (1 of 7 Regional MSPs)
- In office 5 May 2016 – 9 February 2024
- Succeeded by: Tim Eagle

Scottish Conservative portfolios
- 2017–2018: Shadow Cabinet Secretary for Environment, Climate Change and Land Reform
- 2018–2020: Shadow Cabinet Secretary for the Rural Economy
- Feb–Aug 2020: Shadow Cabinet Secretary for Finance
- 2020–2021: Shadow Cabinet Secretary for Health and Sport
- 2021–2024: Shadow Cabinet Secretary for the Constitution, External Affairs and Culture

Personal details
- Born: Donald Andrew John Cameron of Lochiel; 26 November 1976 (age 49) London, United Kingdom
- Party: Scottish Conservatives
- Spouse: Sarah Maclay (m. 2009)
- Children: 5
- Parent: Donald Angus Cameron of Lochiel (father)
- Education: Oriel College, Oxford; City Law School
- Occupation: Lawyer
- Website: Official website

Donald Andrew John Cameron of Lochiel, Baron Cameron of Lochiel (born 26 November 1976), is a Scottish Conservative politician who served as Parliamentary Under-Secretary of State for Scotland from February to July 2024. He was elected a Member of the Scottish Parliament for the electoral region of the Highlands and Islands in 2016, serving the Conservative Shadow Cabinet in various roles before his elevation to the House of Lords in 2024.

Cameron succeeded his father as the 28th Chief of Clan Cameron, in 2023.

== Early life and education ==
Born in 1976 at St Mary's Hospital, London, to Donald Angus Cameron of Lochiel, later 27th Lochiel, and Lady Cecil Cameron (née Kerr), daughter of Peter Kerr, 12th Marquess of Lothian, he was educated at Harrow School. Cameron then went up to read modern history at Oriel College, Oxford, graduating MA with first-class honours. After receiving a Diploma in Law from City University, on the Bar Vocational Course, Cameron was called to the Bar at the Middle Temple in 2005.

Cameron worked as an advocate for ten years before being elected to parliament and acted for a range of clients in public, agricultural and crofting law.

== Political career ==
Cameron stood as the Scottish Conservative candidate in the UK Parliament constituency of Ross, Skye and Lochaber, coming fourth of seven candidates at the 2010 general election with 12.2 per cent of the vote; he came third of the five candidates contesting Orkney and Shetland at the 2015 general election, with 8.9 per cent.

=== Member of the Scottish Parliament ===
At the 2016 Scottish Parliament election, Cameron finished third in the constituency of Argyll and Bute, but was elected as the Conservatives' third-placed candidate on the Highlands and Islands regional list. Scottish Conservative leader Ruth Davidson nominated Cameron to be Shadow Cabinet Secretary for Health and Sport.

The Scottish Conservatives' 2021 Policy Co-ordinator since 2017, Cameron was appointed Shadow Cabinet Secretary for Finance by the Scottish Conservative leader Jackson Carlaw in February 2020, and subsequently Shadow Cabinet Secretary for Health and Sport by his successor Douglas Ross. In May 2021, Cameron was appointed Shadow Cabinet Secretary for the Constitution, External Affairs and Culture.

Cameron helped re-establish the Cross-Party Group on Health Inequalities as one of its three co-convenors until May 2021. He was co-convenor of the Cross-Party Group on MS and the vice-convenor of the Cross-Party Group on Gàidhlig as well as sitting on various other cross-party groups, including those on beer and pubs and on crofting.

In 2022, Cameron joined Douglas Ross in calling for Boris Johnson to resign as Prime Minister over the Westminster lockdown parties controversy, along with a majority of Scottish Conservative MSPs.

=== Peerage ===
Upon the death of his father in October 2023, he succeeded to the chiefship of Clan Cameron, becoming the 28th Lochiel.

Appointed Parliamentary Under-Secretary of State for Scotland in the Scotland Office on 9 February 2024, Cameron resigned his Scottish parliamentary seat on the same day, being replaced by Tim Eagle as Conservative regional MSP for the Highlands and Islands. He was created a Life Peer on 4 March 2024, taking the title of Baron Cameron of Lochiel, of Achnacarry in the County of Inverness, and was introduced to the House of Lords on 5 March 2024, supported by his kinsmen, former Prime Minister David Cameron, Baron Cameron of Chipping Norton, and Ewen Cameron, Baron Cameron of Dillington, a grandson of the 25th Cameron of Lochiel.

== Personal life ==
In 2009, Cameron married Sarah Elizabeth Maclay, only daughter of the Hon. Angus Grenfell Maclay and a niece of Joseph Maclay, 3rd Baron Maclay, DL.

Lord and Lady Cameron have four sons and a daughter.

=== Ancestry ===
Ancestors of Donald Cameron, Baron Cameron of Lochiel

16. Donald Cameron, 24th Lochiel
8. Sir Donald Cameron, 25th Lochiel
17. Lady Margaret Montagu Douglas Scott
4. Sir Donald Cameron, 26th Lochiel
18. Douglas Graham, 5th Duke of Montrose
9. Lady Hermione Emily Graham
19. Violet Hermione Graham, Duchess of Montrose
2. Donald Cameron, 27th Lochiel
20. John Stewart Gathorne-Hardy, 2nd Earl of Cranbrook
10. Lt-Col. the Hon. Nigel Gathorne-Hardy
21. Cicely Marguerite Wilhelmina Ridgway, Countess of Cranbrook
5. Margaret Doris Gathorne-Hardy
22. Sir Charles John Johnston
11. Doris Cecilia Featherston Johnston
23. Alice Margaret Featherston
1. Donald Cameron, 28th Lochiel
24. Lord Walter Kerr
12. Capt. Andrew William Kerr
25. Lady Amabel Cowper
6. Peter Kerr, 12th Marquess of Lothian
26. Capt. William Kerr
13. Marie Constance Annabel Kerr
27. Annabel Jarves
3. Lady Cecil Nennella Therese Kerr
28. Dr Foster Newland
14. Sir Foster Reuss Newland
29. Sophia Louise Reuss
7. Antonella Newland, Marchioness of Lothian
30. Count Michele Salazar y Muratores
15. Donna Nennella Salazar
31. Mariangela Dusmet de Smours

== Coat of arms ==
Coat of arms of the Baron Cameron of Lochiel
Adopted In use from a "remote period"; matriculated 1795 Coronet That of a Baron Crest A Sheaf of five Arrows Proper tied with a Band Gules Helm That of a Peer Escutcheon Gules three Bars Or Supporters Two Savages wreathed head and middle with Oak each holding in his exterior hand a Lochaber Axe all Proper Motto (Above) Aonaibh Ri Chéile (Gaelic: "Let us unite") (Below) Pro Rege et Patria (Latin: "For King and Country") Previous versions The 28th Lochiel's arms displayed a Gentleman's helm prior to his creation as a Life Peer in 2024.

== See also ==
- Lord Lochiel

Orders of precedence in the United Kingdom
Preceded by The Lord Elliott of Mickle Fell	Gentlemen; Baron Cameron of Lochiel	Followed by The Lord Banner
