= Allan Cameron (British Army officer) =

Scottish soldier and curler (1917–2011)

Major Allan Cameron MBE JP DL
- Born: 25 March 1917; Achnacarry Castle, Inverness-shire, Scotland
- Died: 4 December 2011 (aged 94); Invergordon, Scotland
- Spouse: Elizabeth Vaughan-Lee (m. 1945; died 2008)
- Children: 5, including Lord Cameron of Dillington and Lady Donald Graham
- Parent(s): Sir Donald Cameron of Lochiel; Lady Hermione Graham
- Awards: Order of the British Empire; Freedom of Ross and Cromarty

Major Allan John Cameron, MBE, JP, DL (25 March 1917 – 4 December 2011) was a Scottish soldier, landowner and curler. He served in the Queen's Own Cameron Highlanders during the Second World War, rising to the rank of Major. He helped to found the International Curling Federation, the predecessor to the World Curling Federation, and served as its president from 1966 to 1969.

== Early life ==
Born at Achnacarry Castle, near Fort William, Allan Cameron was the second son of Colonel Sir Donald Walter Cameron of Lochiel, 25th Chief of Clan Cameron, and his wife, Lady Hermione Graham (1882–1978), daughter of the 5th Duke of Montrose. He was educated at Harrow and attended the Royal Military College, Sandhurst.

== Military career ==
Cameron was commissioned into the British Army in 1936, aged 19, joining the Queen's Own Cameron Highlanders. After commissioning, he served in India, and was the aide-de-camp for a General while stationed in Egypt. Cameron served during the Battle of Gazala in 1942, which ended in the capture of the port city Tobruk by Axis forces and the surrender of thousands of Allied personnel. Along with two other soldiers, he escaped Italian custody in 1943, but was recaptured by German forces six weeks later, eventually being freed after several years by American soldiers. He returned home, and after marrying, was assigned first to Balmoral Castle and then to the Eaton Hall military training school. He retired from military service in 1947.

== Political career ==
For twenty years, Cameron served on the Ross and Cromarty County Council, serving as the chairman of its education committee from 1962 to 1975. He then moved to the Ross and Cromarty District Council and later became its convener. In 1988, he was made an MBE, and on his 79th birthday, in 1996, he became the third recipient of the Freedom of Ross and Cromarty.

== Curling career ==
After beginning to curl in the 1950s, Cameron became the president of the Royal Caledonian Curling Club in 1963, winning the Swedish Cup in 1964. He then helped found the International Curling Federation, serving as its first president from 1965 to 1969.

== Personal life ==
In 1945, Cameron married (Mary) Elizabeth Vaughan-Lee (1915–2008), eldest daughter and heiress of Colonel Arthur Vaughan-Lee, of Dillington House, Somerset. He is the father of Ewen Cameron, Baron Cameron of Dillington, Christina Cameron, Archibald Cameron and Bride Cameron. The latter married her second cousin, Lord Donald Graham, second son of the 7th Duke of Montrose. His eldest son Allan Douglas Hanning Cameron drowned in 1965.
