= The Marriage of Princess Helena =

Painting by Christian Carl Magnussen

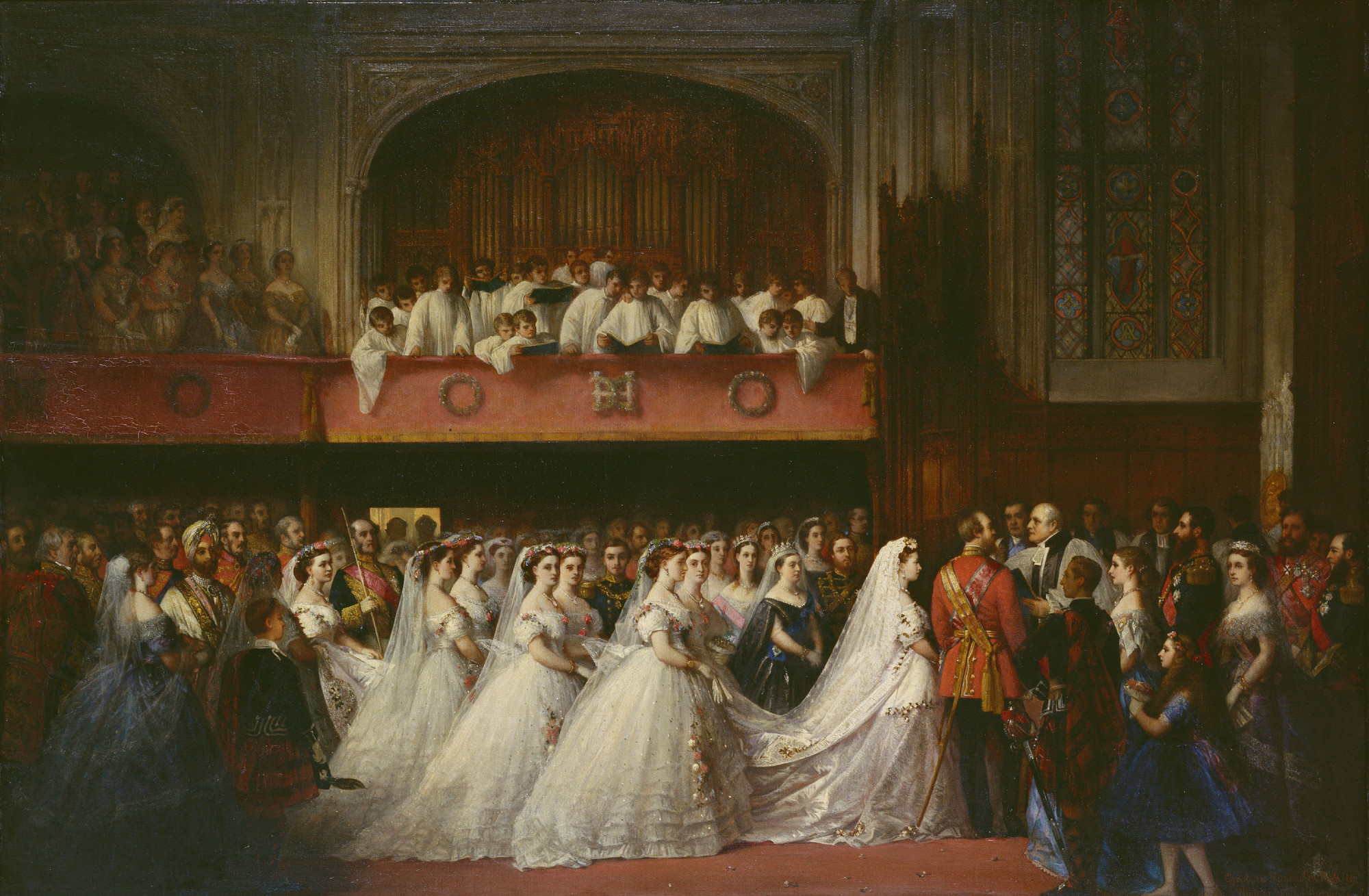
- Artist: Christian Carl Magnussen
- Year: 1866–69
- Type: Oil on canvas, historical painting
- Dimensions: 92.2 cm × 137.1 cm (36.3 in × 54.0 in)
- Location: Royal Collection

The Marriage of Princess Helena is an oil on canvas history painting by the German artist Christian Carl Magnussen, from 1866–69.

== History and description ==
It depicts the wedding of Princess Helena of the United Kingdom and Prince Christian of Schleswig-Holstein in the Private Chapel at Windsor Castle on 5 July 1866. Queen Victoria stands right behind the couple.

Helena was the third daughter of Queen Victoria and Prince Albert. Christian, a minor German prince, was the second son of Christian August II, Duke of Schleswig-Holstein-Sonderburg-Augustenburg, and Countess Louise Sophie Danneskiold-Samsøe. The marriage was deeply opposed by several figures within the British royal family, including the Prince and Princess of Wales, Princess Alice and Prince Alfred.

The work was commissioned by Queen Victoria from Magnussen after recommendations by her eldest daughter, Victoria, Crown Princess of Prussia. The Queen, however, was unsatisfied with the finished painting, a sentiment shared by the Crown Princess of Prussia.
