= John Lindsay (footballer, born 1900) =

Scottish footballer

Personal information
- Date of birth: 1900
- Place of birth: Cardenden, Scotland
- Positions: Left-half; outside left

Senior career*
Years	Team	Apps	(Gls)
1922–1927	Partick Thistle	15	(3)
1925–1926	→ Broxburn United (loan)	20	(5)
1927–1928	Rhyl Athletic		
1928–1930	Liverpool	14	(2)
1930–1931	Swansea Town		
1931–1932	Rhyl Athletic		
?	Bangor City		
?	Lochgelly Amateurs		
- * Club domestic league appearances and goals

John Lindsay was a Scottish footballer who played as a left-half and an outside-left, most notably for Liverpool.

== Career ==
Lindsay started his senior career with Partick Thistle in 1922. After suffering a serious knee injury, he switched to the Welsh side Rhyl Athletic for the 1927–28 season, and he scored 60 goals for the club. This brought him to the attention of English First Division side Liverpool, who signed him in April 1928. He made his Liverpool debut on 1 December 1928, starting the match in a 3–0 victory over Derby County. He scored his first goal for the club on 30 January 1929, in a 5–2 FA Cup fourth round replay defeat to Bolton Wanderers. He left the club when his contract expired in January 1930, having made 16 appearances in total for Liverpool. Lindsay then moved back to Wales, where he joined Swansea Town, before moving back to Rhyl Athletic in 1931. He later played in Northern Ireland for Bangor City and in Scotland for Lochgelly Amateurs.
