= Lord Lieutenant of Inverness =

Ceremonial officer in Inverness, Scotland

The Lord-Lieutenant of Inverness is the British monarch's personal representative in an area which has been defined since 1975 as consisting of the local government districts of Inverness, Badenoch and Strathspey, and Lochaber, in Scotland, and this definition was renewed by the Lord-Lieutenants (Scotland) Order 1996. The area of the lieutenancy used to be the county of Inverness, which was abolished as a local government area by Local Government (Scotland) Act 1973. The districts were created, by the 1973 act, as districts of the two-tier Highland region and abolished as local government areas under the Local Government etc. (Scotland) Act 1994, which turned the Highland region into a unitary council area.

== List of Lord-Lieutenants of Inverness ==
- Sir James Grant, 8th Baronet 17 March 1794 – 1809
- Francis Ogilvy-Grant, 6th Earl of Seafield 2 September 1809 – 30 July 1853
- Thomas Alexander Fraser, 12th Lord Lovat 26 August 1853 – 1873
- Simon Fraser, 13th Lord Lovat 18 April 1873 – 6 September 1887
- Donald Cameron, 24th Lochiel 17 October 1887 – 30 November 1905
- Alfred Donald Mackintosh 11 December 1905 – 14 November 1938
- Colonel Sir Donald Cameron, 25th Lochiel 2 January 1939 – 11 October 1951
- Alexander Godfrey Macdonald, 7th Baron Macdonald 28 January 1952 – 29 November 1970
- Sir Donald Hamish Cameron, 26th Lochiel 31 January 1971 – 1985
- Lachlan Mackintosh 25 October 1985 – 26 December 1995
- James Gray, Baron Gray of Contin 5 December 1996 – 2002
- Donald Angus Cameron, 27th Lochiel 19 November 2002 – 3 August 2021
- James Robert Edwards Wotherspoon 4 August 2021 – present
