= Harro Magnussen =

German sculptor

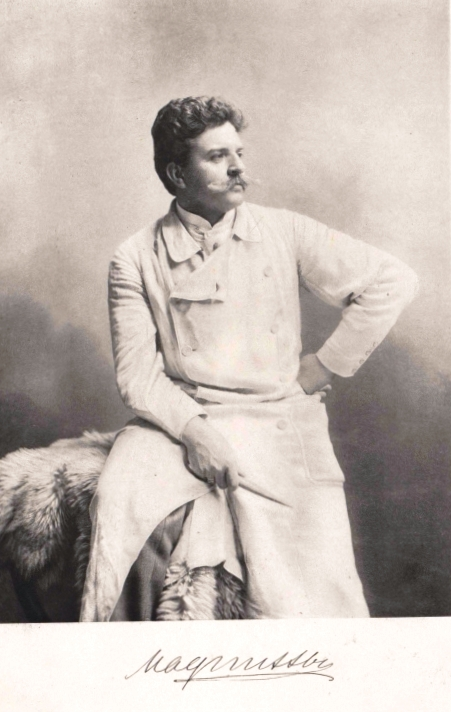
Harro Magnussen (1901), photograph by Franz Kullrich (1864–1917)

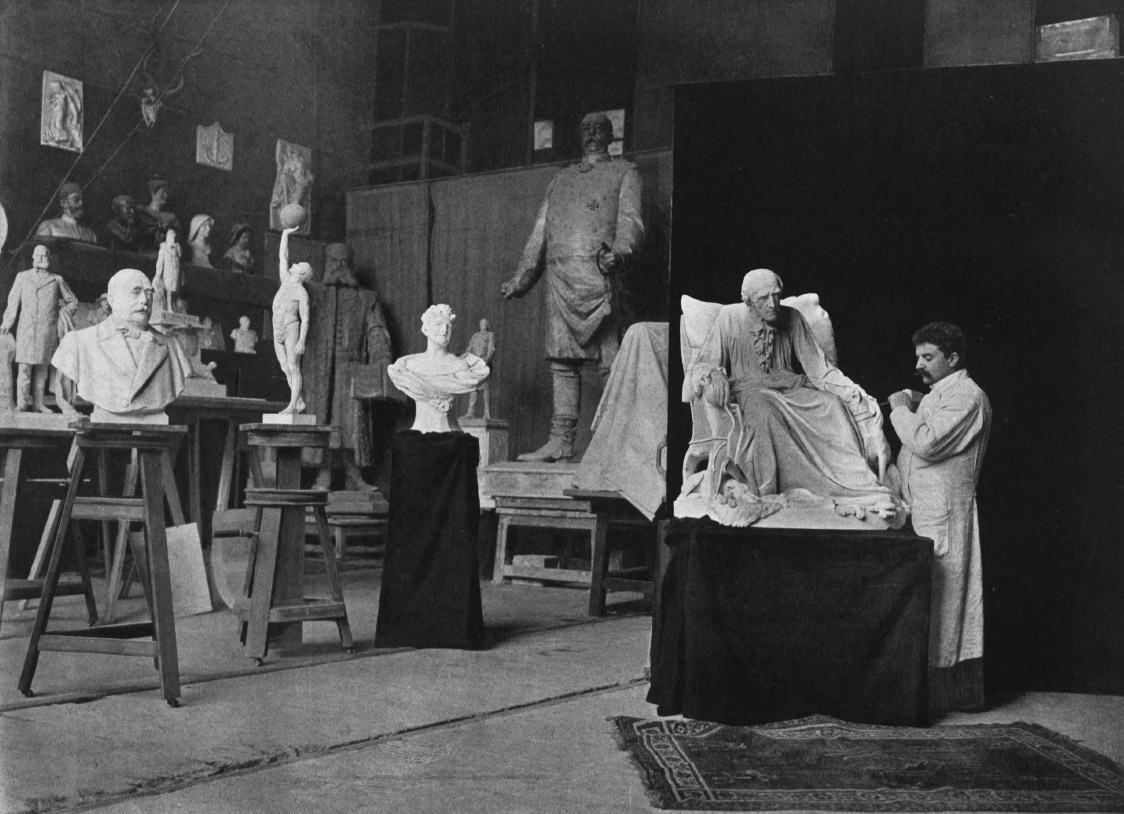
Magnussen in his studio. (1898)

Harro Magnussen (14 May 1861 – 3 November 1908) was a German sculptor.

== Early life, education, and training ==
Magnussen was born in Hamm, and received his first lessons in drawing, modelling and carving wood from his father, the painter Christian Carl Magnussen. In 1882, he began his formal training in Munich with Nikolaus Gysis, Gabriel von Hackl and Ludwig von Löfftz. Despite being in Munich, he was most impressed by works from the Berliner Bildhauerschule (Berlin School of Sculpture) and went there in 1888, where he obtained a position in the studios of Reinhold Begas, remaining for five years.

== Career ==
In 1889, he produced a bust of Otto von Bismarck that sold over 1,000 copies in plaster and bronze over the next ten years. He became a freelance sculptor in 1893 and entered several competitions for contracts, but with little success. In 1899, his smaller works attracted the attention of Kaiser Wilhelm II, who commissioned him to do a figure of the dying Frederick the Great. This finally brought him to public attention and he was awarded one of the coveted commissions for Wilhelm's ambitious Siegesallee project. His work on that project earned him the Order of the Crown, Class IV.

He committed suicide in Grunewald by asphyxiation with gas. Due to "suggestive evidence" (not specified), his death was briefly investigated as a possible murder by strangulation.

== Books ==
- Die Gestalt des Menschen und Ihre Schönheit. Vorlagen zum Studium des Nackten Menschlichen Körpers, Verlag von J. Singer & Co., Berlin, 1907

== Selected major sculptural works ==
- 1898: Monument for Johannes Honterus at the Biserica Neagră (Black Church) in Kronstadt (now Brașov)
- 1898: "Der Philosoph von Sanssouci in seinen letzten Stunden" (The Philosopher of Sanssouci in his Last Hours), in Frederick the Great's death chamber, later in the Monbijou Palace Berlin; missing since World War II
- 1899: Statue of Fredrick the Great "im Alter seiner Thronbesteigung" (at the age of succession) for the White Hall in the Stadtschloss Berlin
- 1900: Monument for Maria of Jever, in the Castle Park, Jever
- 1900: Siegesallee Group 20: Consisting of Joachim II Hector, Elector of Brandenburg as the central figure, flanked by figures of George, Margrave of Brandenburg-Ansbach and Matthias von Jagow. All of the statues in the Siegesallee were damaged during World War II. Joachim Hector lost his head.
- 1901/02: Marble statues of Bismarck, Moltke and Roon for the Oberlausitzer Ruhmeshalle (Hall of Fame) in Görlitz; missing since 1945.
- 1904: Monument for Albrecht von Roon, Großer Stern, Berlin. It has since been given a new pedestal.
- 1905: Statue of Elector Joachim II for the interior of the Berliner Dom
- 1906: Statue of Kaiser Wilhelm I in Bonn; also now with a new pedestal.

== Gallery ==
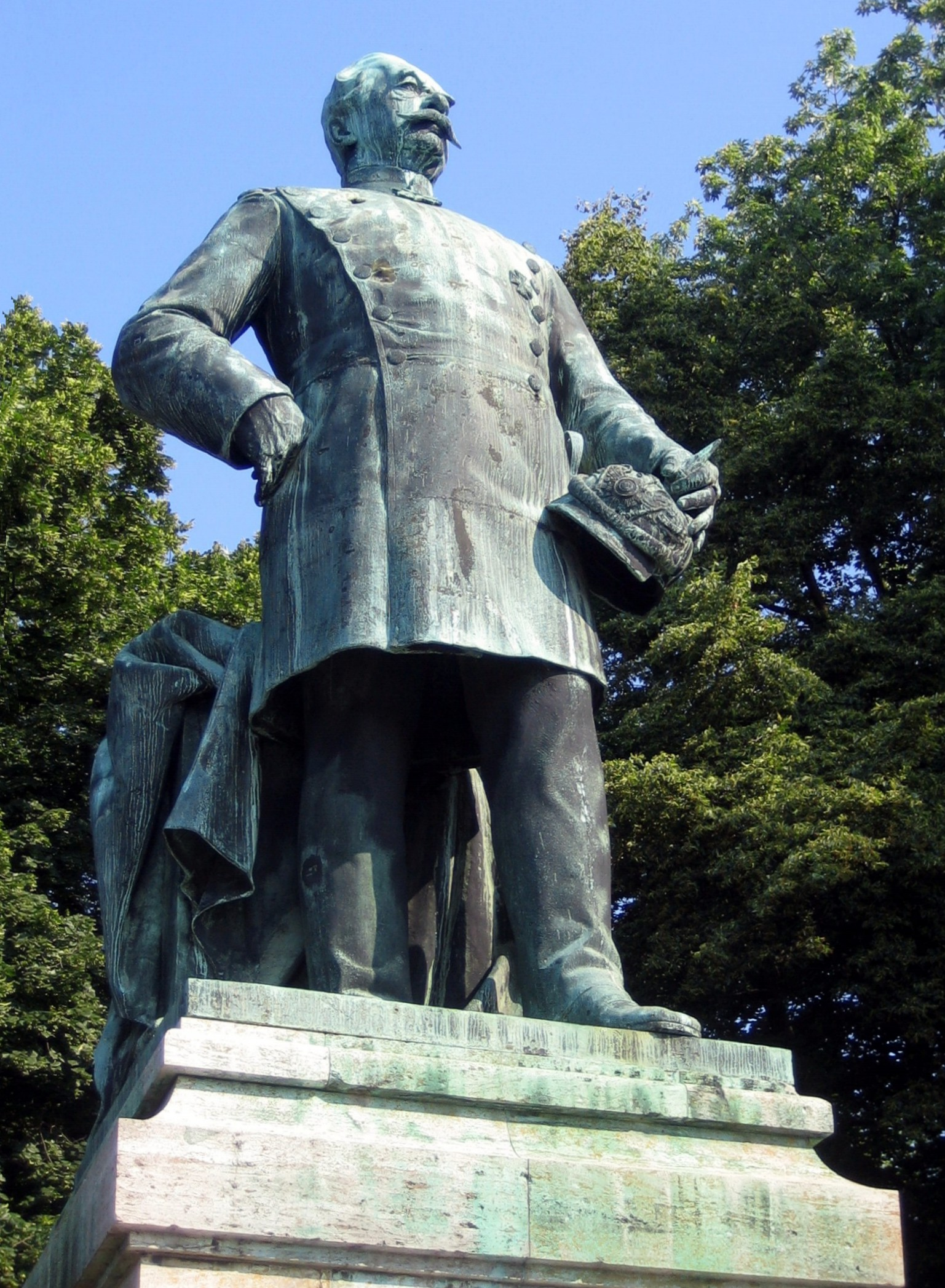
Albrecht von Roon

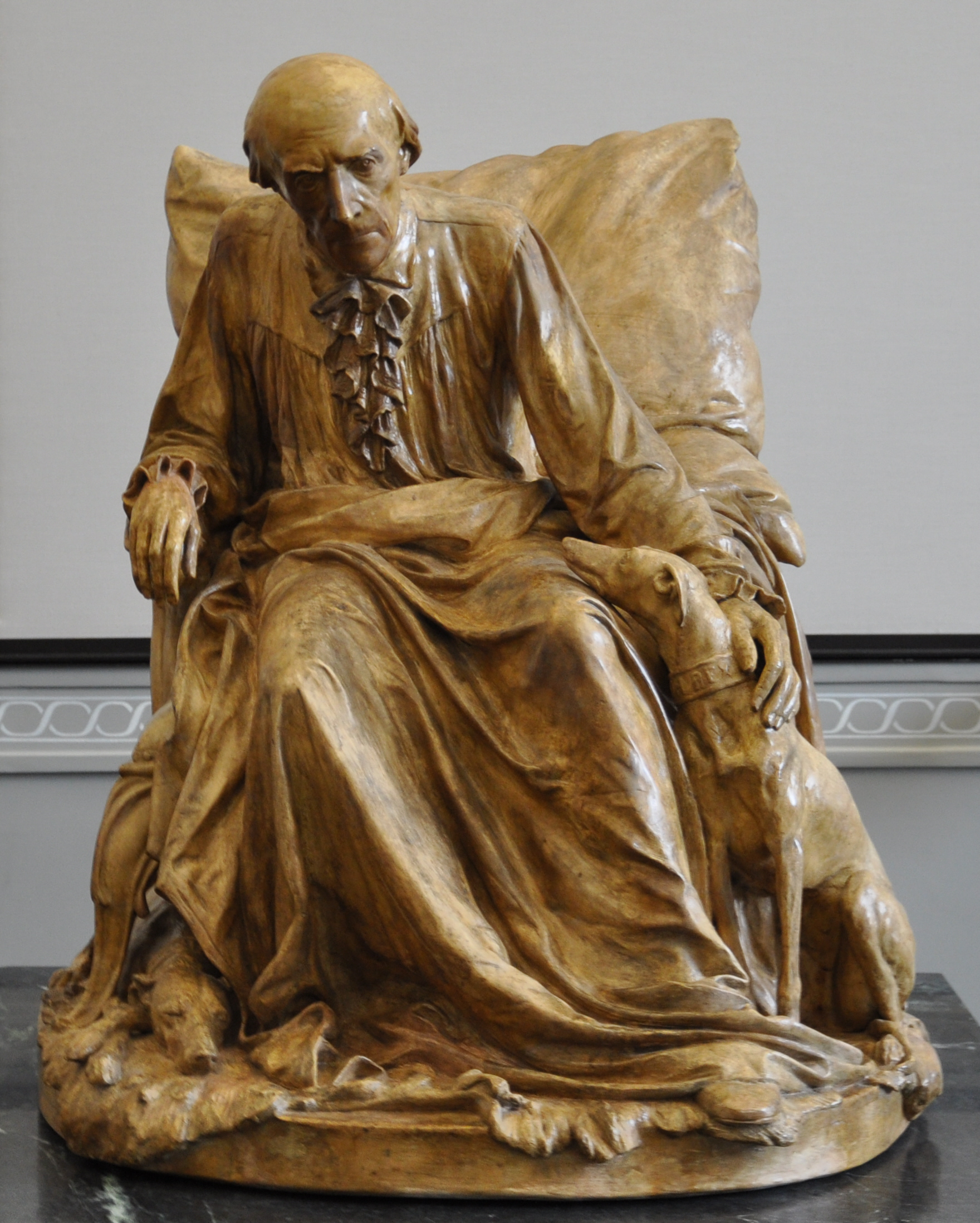
The Philosopher of Sanssouci, (copy, made of tinted plaster)

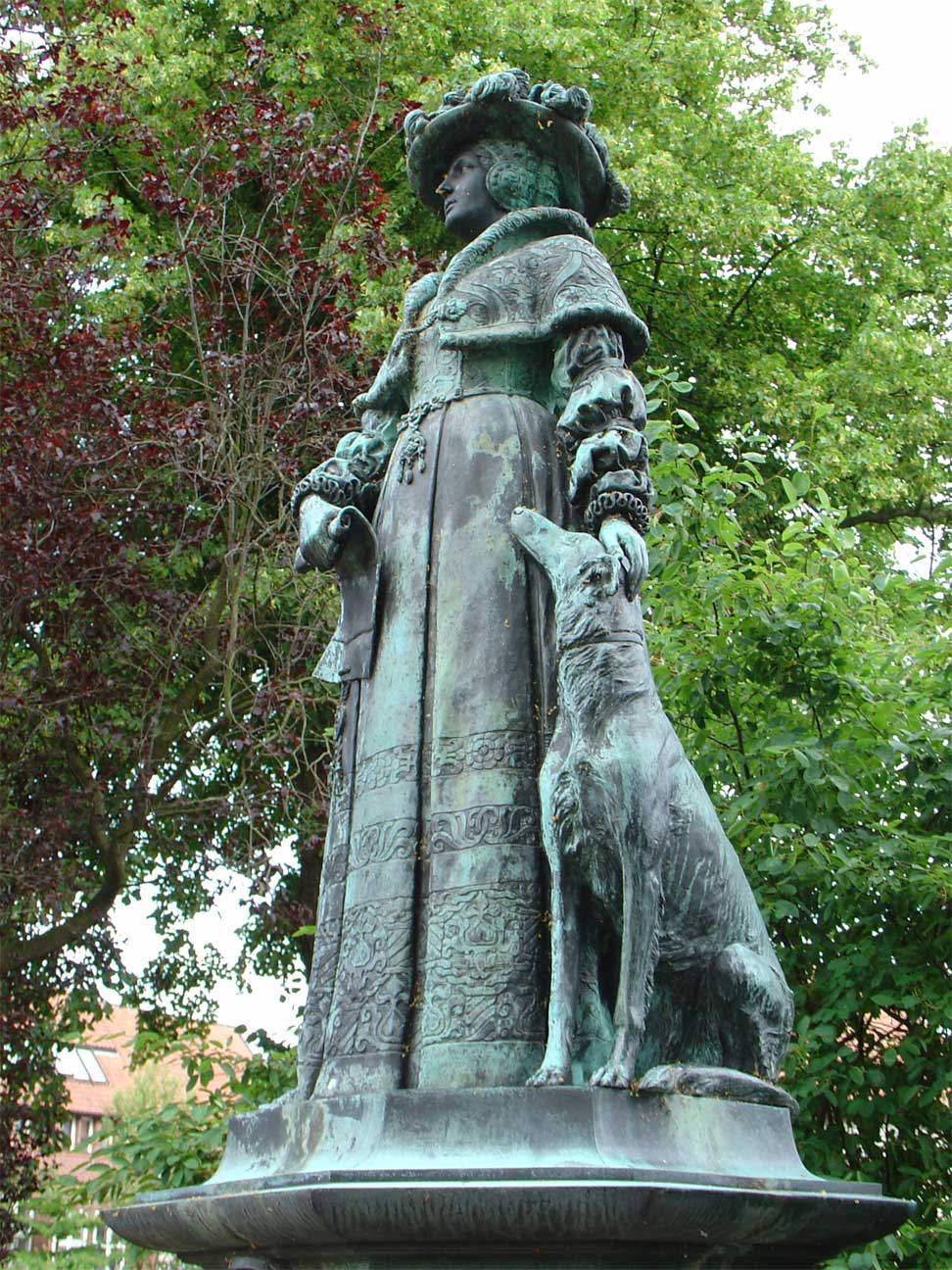
Maria of Jever

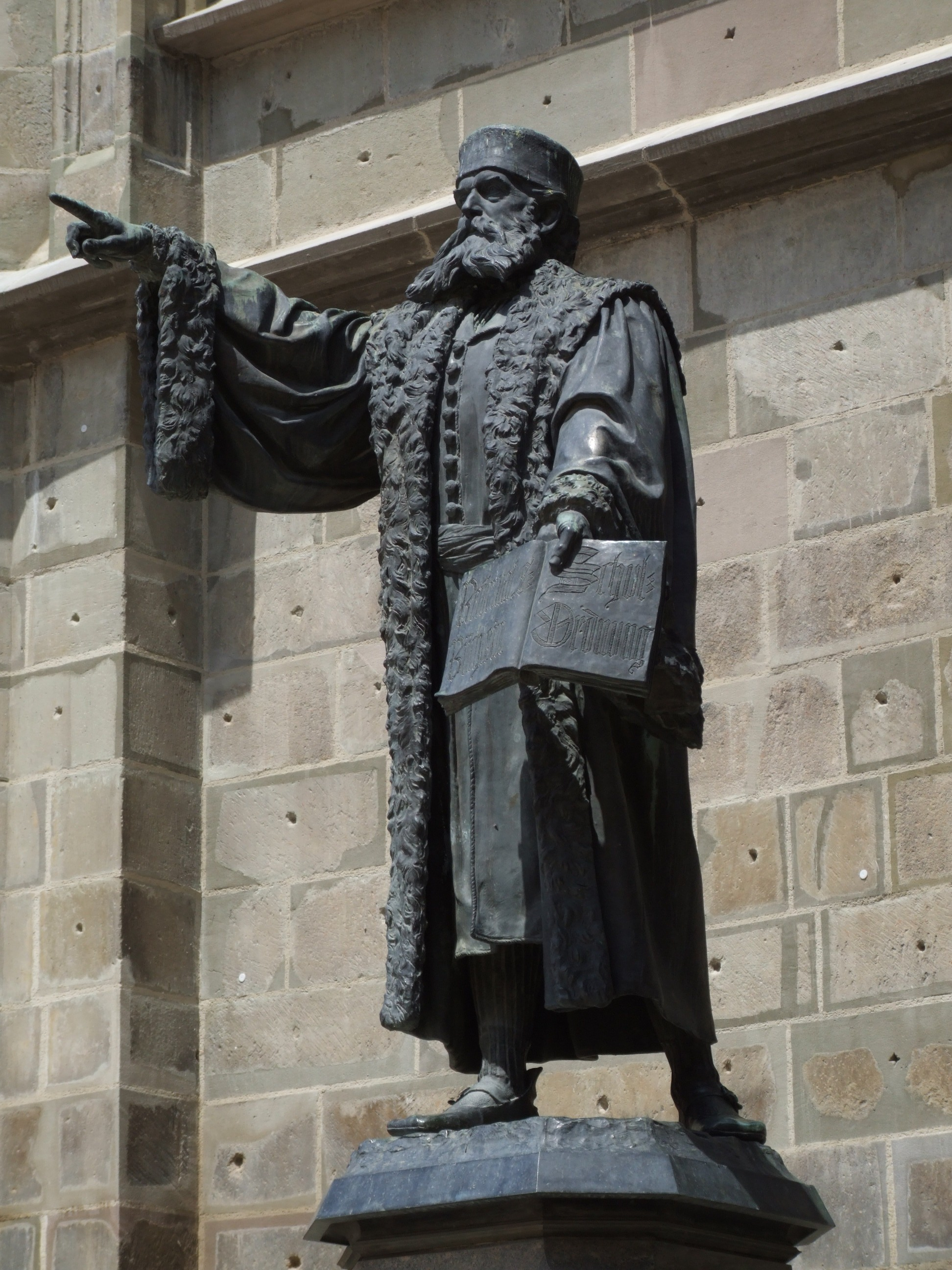
Johannes Honterus
