= APPG on Agriculture and Food for Development =

UK parliamentary group

The All-Party Parliamentary Group (APPG) on Agriculture and Food for Development is a cross-party group in the UK Parliament, co-chaired by Heidi Alexander, a Labour Member of Parliament and Lord Cameron of Dillington, a cross-bench Peer. The APPG is composed of over 70 MPs and Peers from across the political spectrum and is based in London.

== Established ==
The APPG was established in October 2008 in response to growing concerns over the heightened Food Crisis and a steady decline in the importance given to agricultural development and food security at both bilateral and multilateral levels. In January 2010 it published the results of its intensive first Parliamentary Inquiry Why no Thought for Food?.

== Aims ==
The Group seeks to bring together Parliamentarians concerned with agriculture, nutrition and wider food security in the developing world. This cross-party group aims to raise awareness on these issues and engender progressive and informed debate within Westminster and beyond by bridging the gap between policy makers and practitioners in the field whilst also giving a voice to the 700 million smallhold farmers worldwide.

== Activities ==
The APPG is one of the more active in the UK Parliament, undertaking inquiries, holding meetings, tabling debates and asking questions of the Government, among other things. In September 2010 it held a field trip for new MPs to Kenya, during which time 4 MPs and 1 Lord learnt about the issues facing smallholder agriculture and food security in East Africa.

== APPGs for Development ==
Following the high turn-over of MPs at the last election 25 APPGs have begun working together as part of an informal broad alliance to help maintain International Development on the UK agenda. In July 2010 the APPGs hosted their first joint meeting for new MPs with Bill Gates, The Bill and Melinda Gates Foundation; Alan Duncan, Minister of State for DFID; Douglas Alexander, then Shadow Secretary of State for International Development; Harriet Lamb, Executive Director of The Fairtrade Foundation and; Aaron Oxley, Executive Director of RESULTS UK. The Groups are currently in the planning stage of their next meeting.
