= Her Heart for a Compass =

2021 novel by Sarah Ferguson, Duchess of York

- Author: Sarah Ferguson, Duchess of York
- Language: English
- Genre: Romance novel
- Publisher: Mills & Boon
- Publication place: United Kingdom
- Pages: 560
- ISBN: 978-0-00-838360-2

Her Heart for a Compass is a 2021 romance novel by Sarah Ferguson, Duchess of York. The novel is a semi-fictional story about the Duchess's great-great-aunt, Lady Margaret Montagu Douglas Scott.

== Plot ==
Margaret's hair is frequently featured, it's variously a "rebellious red mop", a "sodden mass of rebellious curls", a "scarlet flag, wild curls whipping around her face", and "burnished autumn leaves".

Drawing on many parallels from the authors life for the historical tale, Lady Margaret Montagu Douglas Scott was pictured in a Victorian-style floor-length outfit, complete with high-necked blouse, jacket and gloves, sitting on a stone bench gazing at a compass she held out in front of her, the Lady – although her family, the Duke and Duchess of Buccleuch, were close friends with the Queen and the Prince Consort, the Duke's ex-wife and the Queen's former in-law – struggled to come to terms with the rigorous disciplines of royal life after marrying, and that their second daughter, Margaret, was a redhead with a birthday "within a few days" of her own.

The real details of Margaret's own life are scant; described in gossip rags as a "Titian-haired breath of fresh Scotch air", was "15 years in the making". Beginning when she discovered romance, her heroine's 'rebellious' red hair is much more of a feature, that depicts her as a woman who is initially the toast of London in the Duchess' historical novel, than sex. The Fleet Street papers initially loved her raunchy edge but eventually decided it was more vulgar than charming. "It was always that I was portrayed as the sinner," she says.

An act of rebellion costs Lady Margaret Montagu Douglas Scott her place in society, leading to her needing to count on, and testing her own courage and resilience.

The novel follows Lady Theodora Grosvenor as she navigates the expectations of Victorian high society and the marriage market. After becoming the subject of public scandal and criticism in the press, she leaves aristocratic society and experiences financial hardship. The story traces her journey from the royal court and country houses in Scotland and Ireland to the slums of London and, later, to New York City in the 1870s, where she seeks greater independence and a new direction in life.

Margaret embarked on a journey of self-discovery where she met her companions who shape her world.

It follows the Lady Margaret Montagu Douglas Scott, "who desires to break the mould, follow her internal compass – her heart – and discover her raison d'être – falling in love along the way". She is described as a spirited, Titian-haired, freckled beauty.

The novel veers around somewhat in tone, from archaic – Margaret's priest informs her that "you cannot have imagined I would have kissed you in such a manner unless my intentions were honourable" and one admirer opines: "She was very naive but, by heavens, she had real spirit, too, no one could doubt that."

Well-researched, and a glimpse into the strictures of life as a pampered, rich, upper-class woman. It wears its research lightly, with intriguing forays into topics such as Victorian bathing dresses, and the Queen's predilection to "pour her tea from one cup to another until it was adequately cooled". Margaret realising that she doesn't need to "conform to the rules set down by society", that a Buccleuch woman doesn't need a strategic marriage, and that her despairing cry, "no one seems to care that underneath I'm an actual person", isn't altogether true.

== Characters ==
- Lady Margaret Montagu Douglas Scott
- Donald Cameron of Lochiel
- Rufus Ponsonby, Earl of Killin
- Sebastian Beckwith
- Princess Louise
- Julia Wingfield, Viscountess Powerscourt
- Mervyn Wingfield, Viscount Powerscourt
- Walter, Duke of Buccleuch
- Charlotte, Duchess of Buccleuch
- Queen Victoria
- Aunt Marion
- Patrick Valentine
- Mrs William Astor
- Fraser Scott
- Susannah Elmhirst

== Production ==
The publishing rights were acquired by Mills & Boon. The book is published by William Morrow and Company in the United States. Ferguson worked with Scottish romance author Marguerite Kaye on the novel.

== Reception ==
The novel placed 10th in the United Kingdom's hardback fiction bestsellers chart, after selling 1,079 copies in the week ending 14 August 2021. In the novel's first week it sold 1,241 hardback copies.

Critical reception of the novel was generally mixed. The Times's Sarah Ditum called the novel a "thinly veiled wish fulfilment fantasy" that "is more slog than seduction" and rated it two out of five stars. The Daily Telegraph's Hannah Betts described the novel as "underwhelming" and also rated it two out of five stars. The Guardian's Alison Flood praised the work as "chaste good fun". The Independent's Roisin O'Connor rated the novel three out of five stars. The Evening Standard's Melanie McDonagh recalled the novel as "amiable tosh" and "a perfect example of the genre".
