= Lochgelly Amateurs F.C. =

Association football club in Lochgelly, Scotland

Lochgelly Amateurs
- Full name: Lochgelly Amateurs F.C.
- Founded: 1929
- Dissolved: 1934
- Ground: Recreation Park
- Secretary: Bailie Timmons
- Trainer: Paddy Lee
Home colours

Lochgelly Amateurs Football Club was an association football club from Lochgelly, in Fifeshire, Scotland, which reached the first round of the Scottish Cup in 1932 and 1933.

== History ==
On 24 April 1929, the directors of the recently defunct Lochgelly United met to found a new amateur club to represent the town on the senior football stage; a Lochgelly Amateurs side had played until the early part of the decade. The new club immediately applied to join the Scottish Football Association and the East of Scotland League - the latter vetoed by clubs from the Borders, unable to cover the distance to Fifeshire - and the Amateurs played their first game on 24 August 1929, against Burntisland Amateurs, its initial line-up including James Gordon, son of former international player Jimmy.

The Amateurs duly entered the Scottish Qualifying Cup for 1929–30, but lost 4–1 in the first round at home to Burntisland Shipyard, and missed a penalty after McLaren struck the bar.

=== Local league football ===
The Amateurs' prospects improved in 1930–31, thanks to a split in the East of Scotland League between the Borders and clubs closer to Edinburgh, over gate money guarantees. The Amateurs were accepted as founder members of the new Edinburgh and District League, and also started to enter the Fife Cup, and its sister competition, the Wemyss Cup. The Amateurs however could not compete against professional clubs, its successes mostly coming against fellow amateurs or part-timers. It also suffered a tragedy in January 1931, after the 18 year old John Armstrong, who had played for the Amateurs in the Qualifying and Wemyss Cups that season, died in hospital.

The club did beat St Andrews University to reach the Wemyss Cup final in 1930–31, and an unexpected win over Raith Rovers in the same competition in 1934. Its biggest competitive win was 8–1 over the Argyll & Sutherland Highlanders in the 1931–32 league, although its most notable win was 6–1 over Edinburgh City "A" in the same competition in the same season. It was however generally a mid-table outfit until its final season.

The Amateurs however had a little more success in the Qualifying Cup. In 1931–32, the club beat Shipyard - the third time the clubs had met in the Amateurs' three entries - for the first time, and won through to the competition's semi-final, losing 1–0 to Inverness Citadel (the eventual winners) in a replay. One oddity from the tie was that, due to the lack of an inside-right, Lochgelly local Campbell White, who had had a season with Charlton Athletic, stepped up to volunteer free of charge. However, he had not yet been re-instated as an amateur, so the Scottish FA ordered the club to change its name to Lochgelly until he was cleared the following month.

By reaching so far, the club was put into the first round draw for the 1931–32 Scottish Cup itself. Given a plum tie at home to Heart of Midlothian, the Amateurs sold the hosting rights to travel to Tynecastle Park. It lost the tie 13–3; the score was 7–0 at half-time, Breslin (2) and M'Fadyen scoring the Amateurs' goals, but Battles scoring five against.

The club repeated the run in 1932–33, with an odd end in the Qualifying Cup semi-final, as the club drew 0–0 at home Penicuik Athletic, hitting the bar twice and doing "almost everything but score". However the club collapsed to a 10–0 defeat in the replay. Not even given the "ghost of a chance" against Kilmarnock in the first round, the Amateurs restored a considerable amount of honour by only going down 3–1, all three Killie goals coming in the first-half, and M'Allister surprising the home crowd just after the start of the second.

=== Closure of club ===
The club was never a financial success - its gate income in the 1932–33 season was a mere £68, the club kept going by a share of a gate of over £175 in the Cup tie at Tynecastle, and £125 in that at Rugby Park - and the club only played half of the 1933–34 league season, winning only 1 of 10 games. The club was forced to disband in April 1934 after the local council requisitioned its ground for housing; it managed to form an XI for the Wemyss Cup final on 28 April 1934, despite some local scepticism. The 5–2 defeat at Dunfermline Athletic was the club's final match, and the very last competitive action of the club came from Cusack scoring a consolation "just on time".

== Colours ==
The club wore the same colours as Lochgelly United in its final seasons, i.e. black and amber shirts, and white shorts.

== Ground ==
Similarly, the club played at the same ground as United, namely Recreation Park.

== Notable player ==
- David Cameron, left-back, signed up in 1932
- John Lindsay, outside-left
