= Lady Margaret Montagu Douglas Scott =

Scottish aristocrat (1846–1918)

Lady Margaret Cameron of Lochiel
- Born: Lady Margaret Elizabeth Montagu Douglas Scott; 10 October 1846; Dalkeith Palace, Midlothian, Scotland
- Died: 5 February 1918 (aged 71); London, England
- Spouse: Donald Cameron of Lochiel (m. 1875; died 1905)
- Issue: Sir Donald Cameron of Lochiel; Ewen Cameron; Allan Cameron; Archibald Cameron
- Father: Walter Montagu Douglas Scott, 5th Duke of Buccleuch
- Mother: Lady Charlotte Thynne

Lady Margaret Elizabeth Montagu Douglas Scott (10 October 1846 – 5 February 1918), later known as Lady Margaret Cameron of Lochiel, was a Scottish aristocrat.

== Life ==
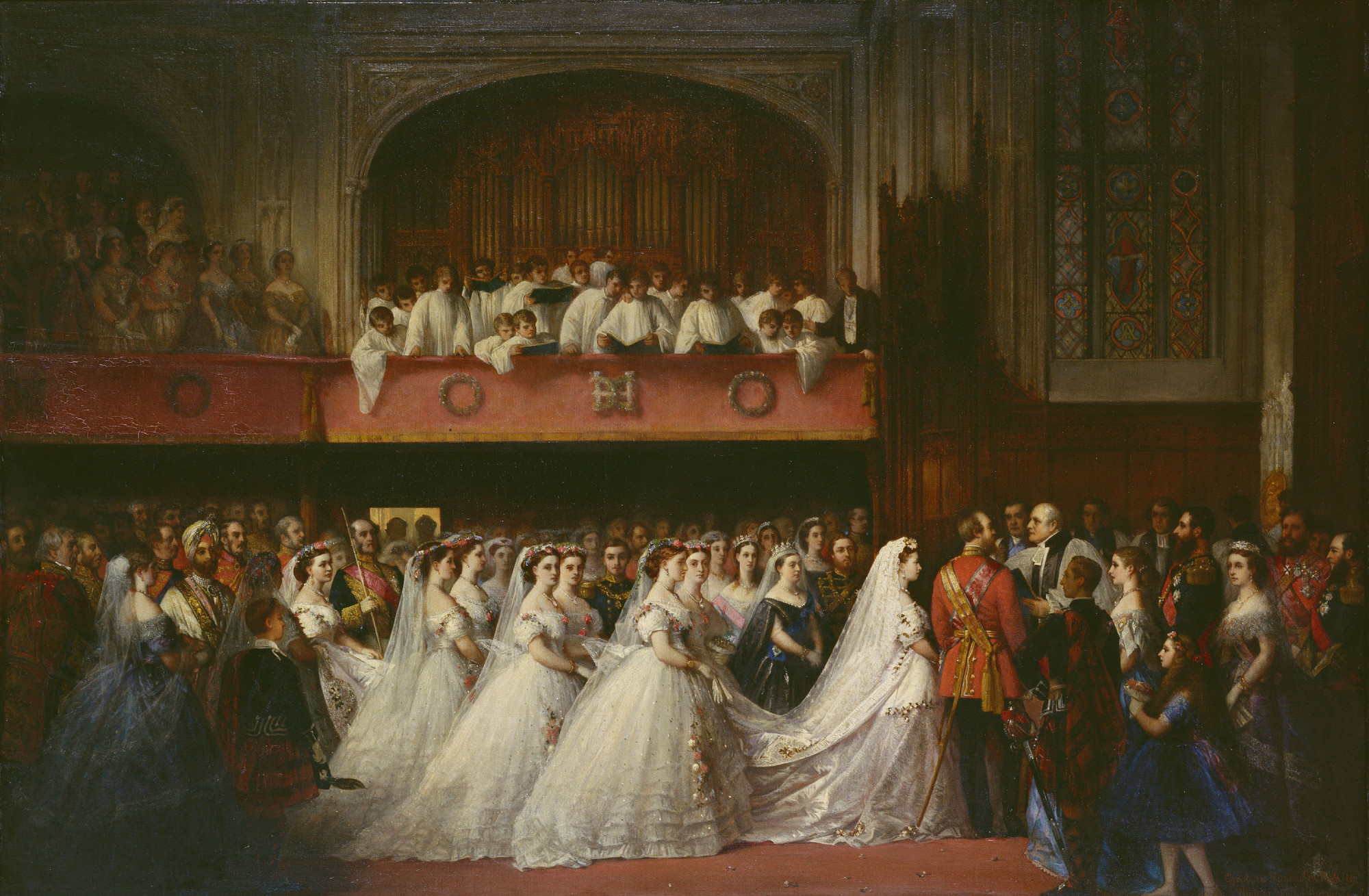
Lady Margaret Scott as a bridesmaid in the painting The Marriage of Princess Helena by Christian Karl Magnussen

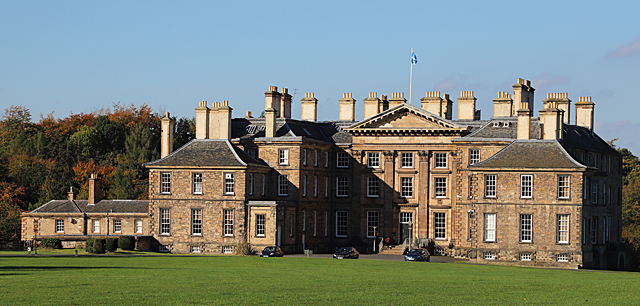
Dalkeith Palace

Lady Margaret Scott was born at Dalkeith Palace in 1846, the second daughter of Walter Montagu Douglas Scott, 5th Duke of Buccleuch, a prominent Scottish peer, politician and landowner, and his wife Lady Charlotte Thynne, daughter of the 2nd Marquess of Bath and Hon. Isabella Byng, daughter of George Byng, 4th Viscount Torrington.

The details of her life before marriage are relatively unknown. She is known, however, to have been a bridesmaid at the wedding of Princess Helena and Prince Christian of Schleswig-Holstein in July 1866.

On 9 December 1875 at Dalkeith, she married Donald Cameron of Lochiel, a diplomat, politician, courtier and the 24th Chief of Clan Cameron. Upon her marriage to Lochiel she became Lady Margaret Cameron of Lochiel and resided at his seat of Achnacarry Castle in the Scottish Highlands. They had four sons:

- Sir Donald Walter Cameron of Lochiel KT (4 November 1876 – 11 October 1951)
- Ewen Charles Cameron (18 February 1878 – 21 March 1958)
- Allan George Cameron (27 July 1880 – 26 September 1914)
- Archibald Cameron (5 January 1886 – 3 May 1917)

All of her sons fought in the First World War; the two youngest, Allan and Archibald, were both killed in action in 1914 and 1917. As for herself, Lady Margaret, who was a widow from 1905 and suffering from arthritis, died on 5 February 1918 of Spanish flu.

== In fiction ==
Lady Margaret is the subject of Sarah, Duchess of York's 2021 historical-fiction romance novel Her Heart for a Compass. In the novel, she is estranged from her family and is sent to Powerscourt in Ireland, then travels to New York before ultimately wedding Lochiel. Sarah is the great-grandniece of Lady Margaret through her nephew Lord Herbert Scott.
