= Johannes Honter =

Transylvanian Saxon renaissance humanist (1498–1549)

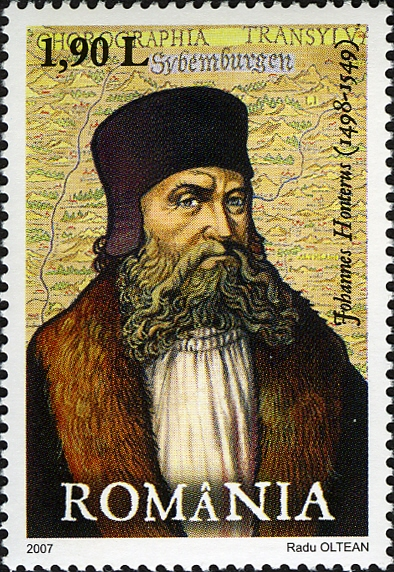
- Honterus on a 2007 Romanian stamp
- Born: Johannes Honter; 1498; Brassó, Transylvania (today Brașov, Romania)
- Died: 23 January 1549 (aged 50–51); Brassó, Transylvania (today Brașov, Romania)
- Known for: founding the Evangelical Church of the Augsburg Confession in Transylvania
- Title: Theologian

Academic background
- Education: University of Vienna (1520–1525); University of Kraków (1530)

Academic work
- Era: Reformation
- Main interests: Lutheranism

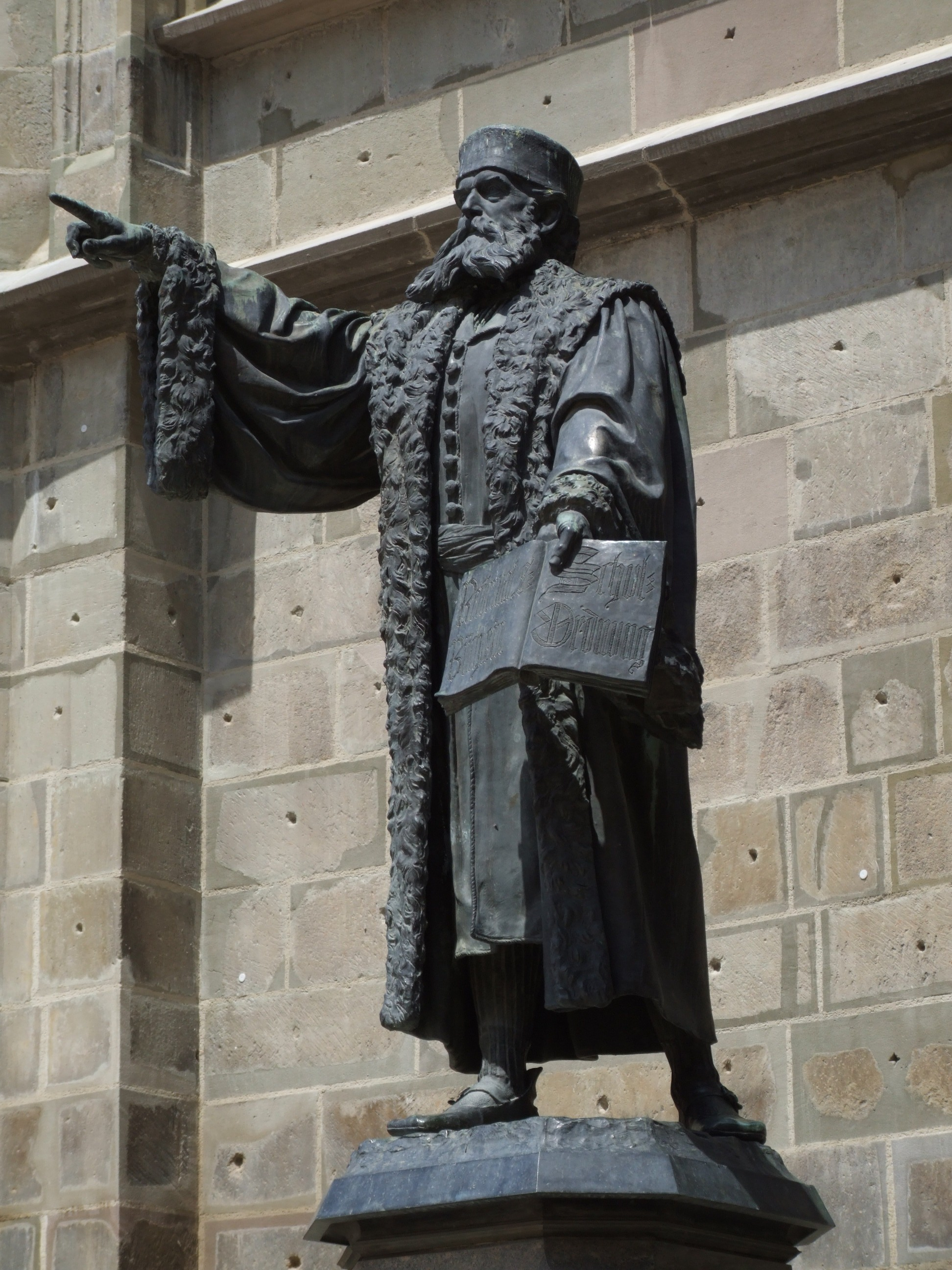
Statue of Johannes Honterus in Brașov, by Harro Magnussen

Johannes Honter (also known as Johann Hynter; Latinized as Johann Honterus or Ioannes Honterus; Romanian sources may credit him as Ioan, Hungarian ones as János; 1498 – 23 January 1549) was a Transylvanian Saxon, renaissance humanist, Protestant reformer, and theologian. Honter is best known for his geographic and cartographic publishing activity, as well as for implementing the Lutheran reform in Transylvania and founding the church, which would become the Evangelical Church of the Augsburg Confession in Romania, after the union of Transylvania with Romania.

== Education and activity ==
=== Early life ===
Born in Brassó (German: Kronstadt, today Brașov, Romania), Transylvania, Kingdom of Hungary, he studied at the University of Vienna between 1520 and 1525, graduating with a magister artium title. As the Ottomans approached Vienna in 1529 (see Siege of Vienna), Honter moved first to Regensburg, and, in 1530, he registered at the Kraków's Jagiellonian University (in Poland) as "Johannes Georgii de Corona, artium magister Viennensis" (Corona is medieval Latin for Brașov). It was in Kraków that he published his first books, a Latin grammar and cosmography manual.

Between 1530 and 1532 he lived in Basel and practiced wood engraving, notably designing two star maps that already show his advanced skills in the craft.

In the same time period he often traveled to his native Transylvania, gathering information that was to serve in his design of a map of Transylvania, commonly known as Siebenbuergen, one that he engraved and printed in Basel, and the very first one of the region to be printed. The only known copy of the map survives in the National Library of Hungary. It is known that Honter was not pleased with the map – he tried to get back all copies that he had sent to friends and other scientists. His plan was to improve the map before reprint and distribution. Dedicated to the leadership of Brassó, it was the basic design for all later maps of Transylvania, up to the early 18th century. Abraham Ortelius made the map famous by beautifully engraving it in copper.

=== In Brașov ===
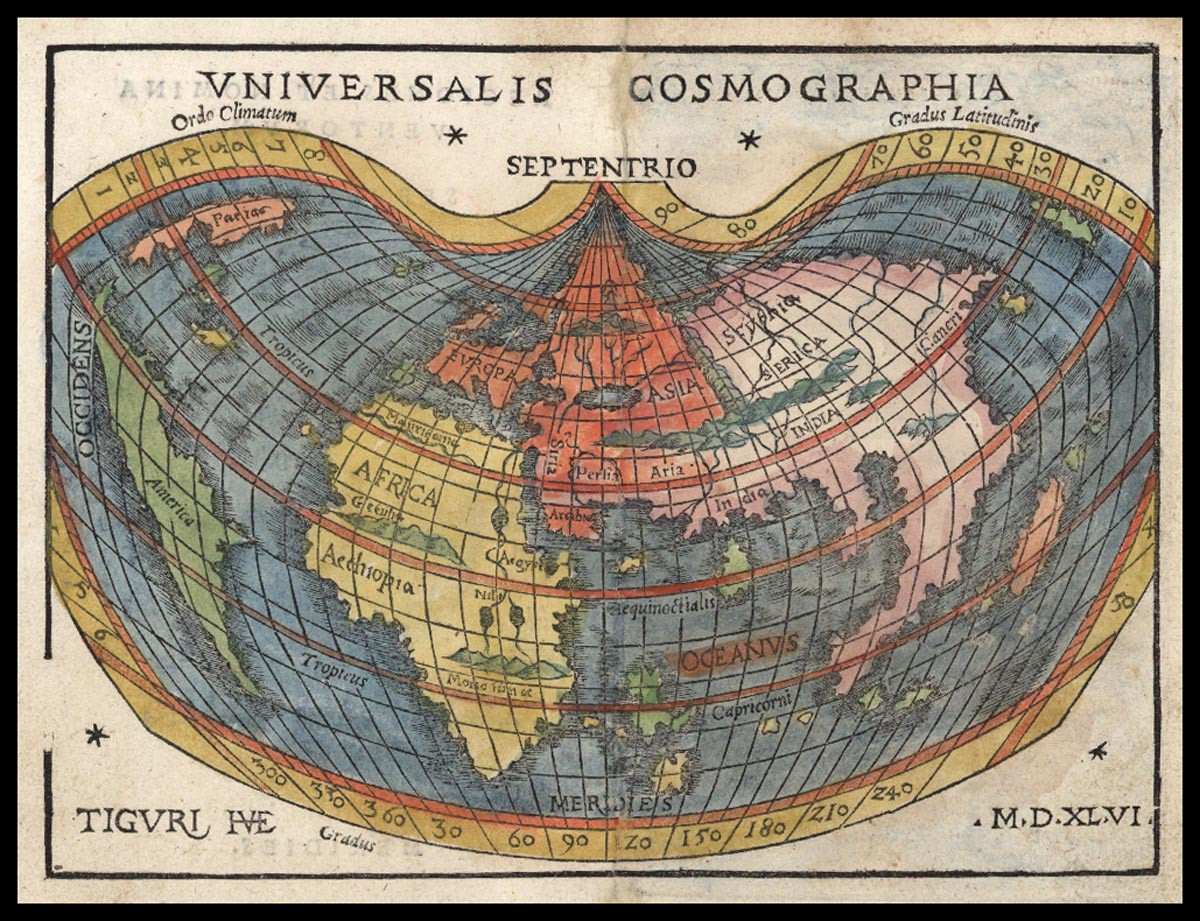
Honter's 1546 map Universalis Cosmographia

He returned to Brassó in 1533 and became involved in local events. During his stay in the Holy Roman Empire, Honter had encountered Protestant ideas, and he worked hard to introduce Lutheranism to Transylvania (German: Siebenbürgen). He attempted to achieve this by informing as many persons as possible. As such, he founded the humanist gymnasium local school (functioning to this day as the "Johannes Honterus" School), set up a printing press (1539), printed a large number of books (some of which he himself authored), such as the Reformationsbuechlein, published the Kirchenordnung aller Deutschen in Siebenbuergen and assisted in the introduction of a paper mill.

In 1542, in Brașov, he printed a new version of his cosmography manual, this time in verse, under the name Rudimenta Cosmographica. He believed that verse would help students remember information contained in the book. Additionally, the book contains 13 maps, engraved by Honter himself. The maps show all known parts of the world. The Rudimenta was so successful that no less than 39 editions of it were printed in Brașov, Zurich, Antwerp, Basel, Rostock, Prague, and Cologne. The book was last reprinted in 1602, but sections of it have been included in other books up to 1692. It can be considered the first European-wide manual.

== Bibliography ==
- NUSSBÄCHER, Gernot; PHILIPPI, Astrid, eds., 1983. Odae cum harmoniis 1548. Facsimilia and music transcriptions. București: Editura Muzicală
