= Dillington House =

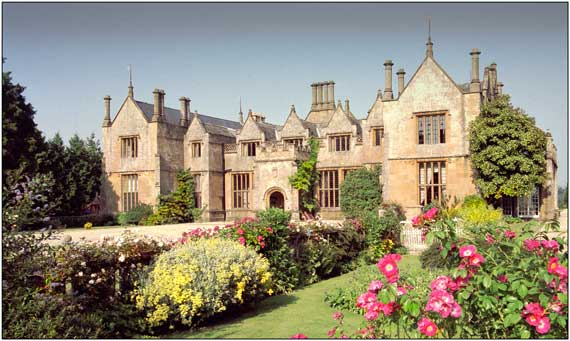
- Dillington House, 2005

- Location within Somerset
- 50°56′10″N 2°54′05″W

History
- Built: 16th century

Listed Building – Grade II*
- Official name: Dillington House
- Designated: 4 February 1958
- Reference no.: 1057040

Listed Building – Grade II*
- Official name: Nos.2 AND 3 and attached railings, gate piers and gates
- Designated: 23 September 1950
- Reference no.: 1195064

Listed Building – Grade II
- Official name: Dillington Arts Centre
- Designated: 29 October 1987
- Reference no.: 1175942

Listed Building – Grade II
- Official name: Fountain
- Designated: 29 October 1987
- Reference no.: 1345860

Listed Building – Grade II
- Official name: Obelisk
- Designated: 29 October 1987
- Reference no.: 1308088

Dillington House is a Grade II* listed manor house near Ilminster in the parish of Whitelackington, Somerset, England. The present house, which dates from the 16th century, is owned by Lord Cameron of Dillington. There has been a house on the site since before the Norman Conquest, probably taking advantage of the nearby chalybeate spring. Until 2022 the house was operated by Somerset Council.

== History ==
There has been a house on the site since before the Norman Conquest, probably taking advantage of the nearby chalybeate spring.

The present house has 16th-century origins, but was remodelled around 1838, in the Jacobean style, by its then owner John. E. Lee to the design of Sir James Pennethorne. Lee, who purchased the house, had been born John Hanning and had assumed the surname Lee on becoming the heir of his uncle Major Edward Lee (d.1819) of Orleigh Court, Buckland Brewer, North Devon. John Lee's brother-in-law and his tenant at Orleigh Court was William Speke of Jordans near Ilminster, father of John Hanning Speke, the celebrated discoverer of the Nile.

Dillington House was the country residence of George III's Prime Minister, Lord North who acquired it through marriage to Anne North, Countess of Guilford. The stables, which were built in the 18th or early 19th century, were remodelled in 1875 by George Nattress and later in the 1960s when the coach-house was converted into a theatre. The two lodges adjacent to the main gate are also Grade II* listed and are in private ownership.

In 1940 the "Fortress Ilminster" project saw the area prepare for what was thought to be imminent invasion by the Nazis. The drive extending from the town, north toward Dillington House hosted tank barricades and concrete gun emplacements, as part of the Taunton Stop Line. Remains of Fortress Ilminster can still be seen today and the drive is now a public footpath.

The house has been designated a Grade II* listed building since 4 February 1958.

In the spring of 2009 a new building, The Hyde, was opened, providing two studio spaces, additional dining accommodation and 15 fully accessible bedrooms. Designed by Tim Rolt and Dan Talkes of Purcell Miller Tritton, the building won the 2010 South-West Region Architecture Award from the Royal Institute of British Architects.

== Present use ==
Dillington House has offered a range of adult education day courses and residential short courses, in addition to a programme of public lectures. As well as being a hotel, it has also been used as a venue for conferences and meetings, weddings and other private events, with the residential accommodation set in historic parkland and gardens. In 2017 the house and gardens were used as the location for a short documentary film, highlighting the national decrease in the numbers of Pembroke Welsh Corgis.

The venue struggled to be economically viable for more than a decade and was predicted to lose more than £500,000 over the 2022/23 financial year. In September 2022 Somerset Council decided to end its operations at Dillington House, in a bid to prevent further losses for taxpayers. The venue, which had more than 30 staff, confirmed that it would close its doors in September 2023. An auction in 2023 raised in excess of £100,000, with more than 900 people bidding for the property’s assets.
