= David Cameron (footballer, born 1936) =

Scottish footballer

Personal information
- Full name: David Cameron
- Date of birth: 10 March 1936
- Place of birth: Glasgow, Scotland
- Date of death: 27 June 2006 (aged 70)
- Place of death: Glasgow, Scotland
- Position: Inside forward

Senior career*
Years	Team	Apps	(Gls)
- Rutherglen Glencairn
1958–1959	Bradford City	7	(2)
- Ashfield
- * Club domestic league appearances and goals

David Cameron (10 March 1936 – 27 June 2006) was a Scottish professional footballer who played as an inside forward.

== Career ==
Born in Glasgow, Cameron played for Rutherglen Glencairn, Bradford City and Ashfield. For Bradford City, he made 7 appearances in the Football League, scoring twice.

== Sources ==
- Frost, Terry (1988). Bradford City A Complete Record 1903-1988. Breedon Books Sport. ISBN 0-907969-38-0.
