= Donald Cameron (architect) =

Scottish architect

- Born: 10 May 1894; Glasgow, Lanarkshire, Scotland
- Died: 11 July 1972 (aged 78); Daliburgh, Outer Hebrides, Scotland
- Occupation: Architect

Donald John Cameron FRIBA (10 May 1894 – 11 July 1972) was a Scottish architect, prominent in the first half of the 20th century. He was mainly active in the west of Scotland, where he designed schools and churches, although The Building News and Engineering Journal referred to him as being of "septic tank sewage repute" in 1900.

== Early life ==
Cameron was born on 10 May 1894 in Glasgow, the son of seaman Hugh Cameron and Euphemia MacCormick.

He studied at the Glasgow School of Architecture, under Eugene Bourdon, between 1911 and 1916. The First World War affected his studies and training and Brand & Lithgow.

== Career ==
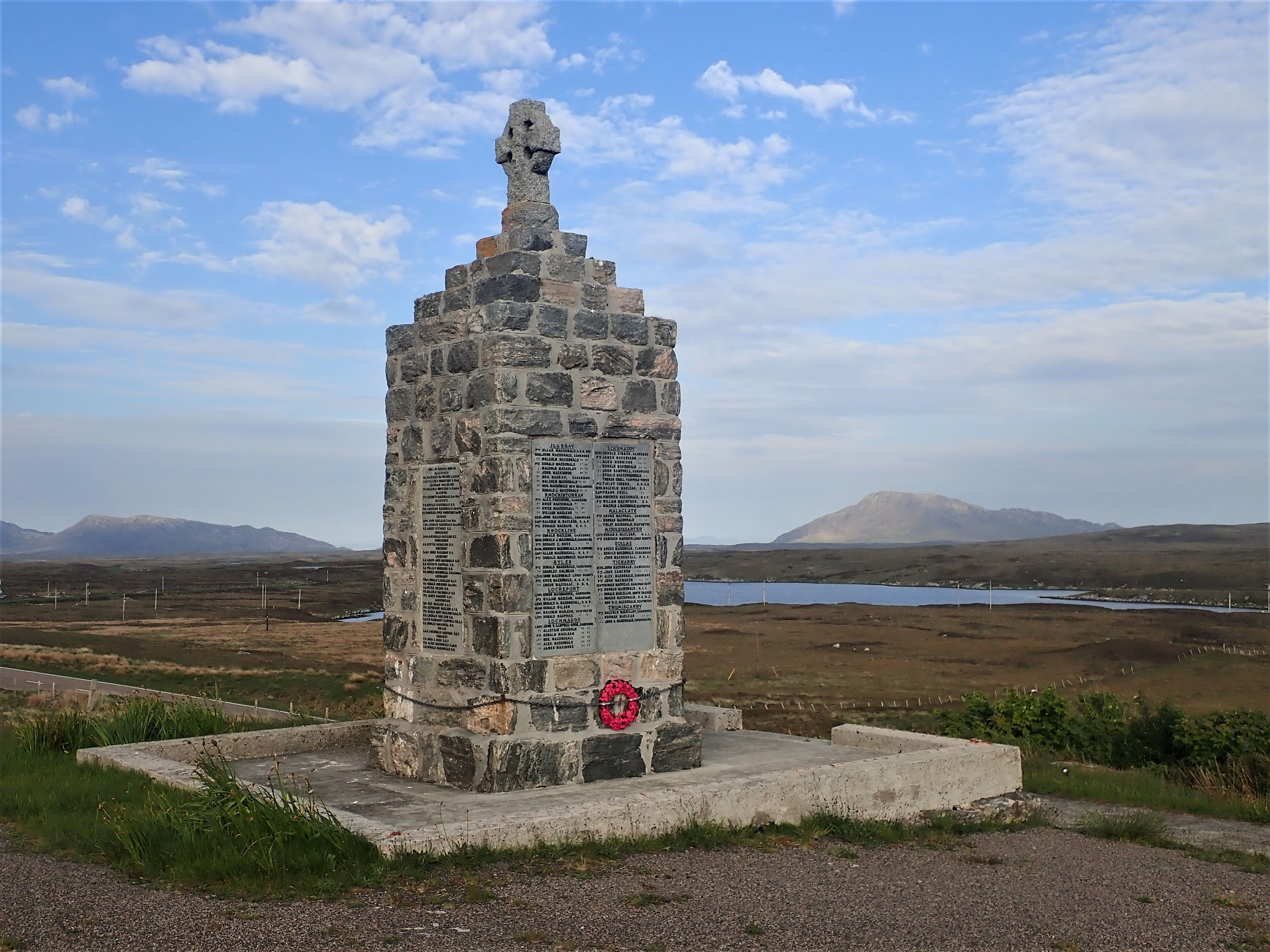
Clachan-ath-Luib War Memorial, North Uist

After being articled to Brand & Lithgow, Cameron later joined the offices of Thomas Lennox Watson and Thomas Baird. He was also part of the architectural department of shipbuilders Alexander Stephen and Sons in Linthouse.

He began his own practice in Glasgow in 1922. Two years later, he formed a partnership with Lithgows, his former employer, at 183 West George Street.

He was working out of his home office by 1934, having closed his Glasgow office.

Cameron became a Fellow of the Royal Institute of British Architects in 1955.

At least one of Cameron's designs, the Clachan-ath-Luib War Memorial in North Uist, is now a listed structure.

=== Selected works ===
Selected works of Cameron include:

- Clachan-ath-Luib War Memorial, North Uist (c. 1920)
- St Mun's Roman Catholic Church, Dunoon (1929)
- Golden Gate Exposition, Scottish Village, San Francisco (1939)

== Personal life ==
Cameron was married to Constance Macdonald, with whom he had a son.

=== Death ===
He died on 11 July 1972, aged 78. He was in Daliburgh in the Outer Hebrides at the time.
