= Donald Angus Cameron of Lochiel =

Scottish clan chief (1946–2023)

The Much Honoured Donald Cameron of Lochiel CVO, JP, DL

Lord Lieutenant of Inverness
- In office 2002–2021

Personal details
- Born: 2 August 1946 Kensington, London, England
- Died: 20 October 2023 (aged 77) Achnacarry, Inverness-shire, Scotland
- Spouse: Lady Cecil Kerr (m. 1974)
- Children: 4, including Lord Cameron of Lochiel
- Parent(s): Sir Donald Cameron of Lochiel; Margaret Gathorne-Hardy
- Education: Christ Church, Oxford
- Military career
- Service years: 1966–1968
- Rank: Lieutenant
- Unit: Queen's Own Cameron Highlanders

Coat of arms of Donald Angus Cameron of Lochiel, CVO

Donald Angus Cameron of Lochiel, CVO, JP, DL (2 August 1946 – 20 October 2023) was the 27th Chief of Clan Cameron. He served as Lord Lieutenant of Inverness from 2002 to 2021.

== Early life ==
He was the eldest son of four children born to Col. Sir Donald Hamish Cameron of Lochiel, 26th Chief, KT, and his wife, Margaret Gathorne-Hardy, only daughter of Lt.-Col. The Hon. Nigel Gathorne-Hardy (1880–1958), a son of the 2nd Earl of Cranbrook.

He was educated at Harrow and went on to read history at Christ Church, Oxford where he graduated as MA.

== Career ==
Donald Cameron, younger of Lochiel, as he was then known, was commissioned as a Lieutenant in the Queen's Own Cameron Highlanders (TA) in 1966. He resigned that commission in 1968. He then trained as a chartered accountant (FCA, 1971).

In 1983, Prince Naruhito (the present Emperor of Japan) stayed at Achnacarry Castle during an expedition to climb Ben Nevis, hosted by Lochiel.

Upon the death of his father in 2004, he assumed the chiefship of Clan Cameron, becoming the 27th Chief "Lochiel". Between 1994 and 1996, he served as president of the Highland Society of London charity. In 1986, he was appointed a Deputy Lieutenant of Inverness-shire, and later served as the Lord Lieutenant of Inverness-shire from 2002 until 2021. He also held the office of Justice of the peace for Inverness-shire. He was appointed a Commander of the Royal Victorian Order (CVO) in the 2018 New Year Honours.

== Illness and death ==
From 1985 until his death Lochiel was disabled, suffering from multiple sclerosis.

Lochiel died on 20 October 2023, at the age of 77, at his residence of Achnacarry, and was succeeded by his son, The Rt. Hon. Donald Andrew Cameron. Lochiel was described as "the most courageous and loving of men, who...as clan chief and Lord Lieutenant of Inverness, was at the heart of life in the West Highlands".

== Family ==
On 1 June 1974 at St. Mary's Cathedral, Edinburgh, he married Lady Cecil Nennella Therese Kerr, OBE, daughter of Peter Kerr, 12th Marquess of Lothian. They had the following children:

- Catherine Mary Cameron (born 1 March 1975), married Henry Trotter, and has issue. She has King Charles III as her godfather and was a bridesmaid to Diana, Princess of Wales.
- Donald Andrew John Cameron, Baron Cameron of Lochiel (born 26 November 1976), Conservative Member of the House of Lords; married Sarah MacIay, scion of the Barons MacIay, and has issue.
- Lucy Margot Therese Cameron (born 5 July 1980), married Lt.-Col. Richard Maundrell, and has issue. She has Anne, Princess Royal as her godmother.

Honorary titles
Preceded by The Lord Gray of Contin	Lord Lieutenant of Inverness-shire; 2002–2021	Succeeded by James Wotherspoon
