= Don Cameron (footballer) =

Australian rules footballer

Personal information
- Full name: Don Cameron
- Born: 17 July 1931
- Original team: Bairnsdale
- Height: 184 cm (6 ft 0 in)
- Weight: 84 kg (185 lb)

Playing career^{1}
Years	Club	Games (Goals)
1953	Melbourne	2 (1)
- ^{1} Playing statistics correct to the end of 1953.

Don Cameron (born 17 July 1931) is a former Australian rules footballer who played with Melbourne in the Victorian Football League (VFL).
