= Ewen Cameron, Baron Cameron of Dillington =

British peer (born 1949)

The Right Honourable The Lord Cameron of Dillington DL FRICS FRSA
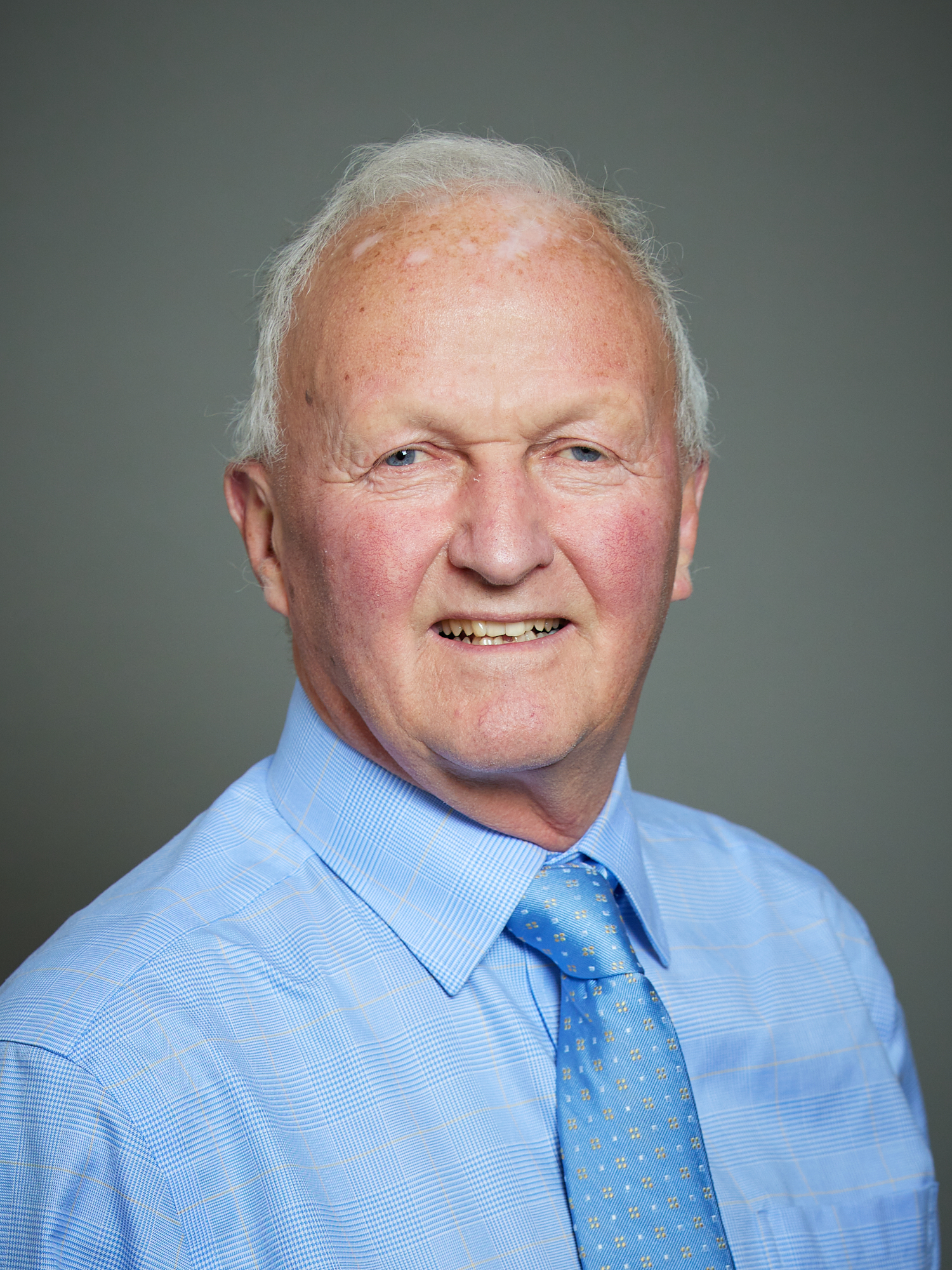
- Official portrait, 2022

Member of the House of Lords
- Lord Temporal
- Life peerage 29 June 2004

High Sheriff of Somerset
- In office 1986–1987
- Preceded by: John Samuel Byard White
- Succeeded by: Michael James Carter

Personal details
- Born: Ewen James Hanning Cameron; 24 November 1949 (age 76)
- Party: None (crossbencher)
- Spouse: Caroline Anne Ripley (m. 1975)
- Children: 4
- Parent: Allan Cameron (father)

Ewen James Hanning Cameron, Baron Cameron of Dillington (born 24 November 1949), is a British farmer, landowner and life peer who sits as a crossbench member of the House of Lords.

== Early years ==
Lord Cameron is one of five siblings and the second but elder surviving son of Major Allan John Cameron, second son of Colonel Sir Donald Walter Cameron of Lochiel, 25th Chief of Clan Cameron in the Scottish Highlands. His mother (Mary) Elizabeth Vaughan-Lee was descended from a Somerset-based land-owning family.

He was educated at Harrow School and at Oxford University, where he studied modern history.

== Career ==
Cameron has been manager of the Dillington House Estate, near Ilminster in Somerset, which has been in his mother's family for over 250 years and from which he has taken part of his title, since 1971. He was national president of the Country Land and Business Association from 1995 to 1997 and was a member of the UK Government's Round Table for Sustainable Development from 1997 until 2000, when it was abolished to create the Sustainable Development Commission. He was chair of the Countryside Agency from 1999 to 2004 and was the UK Government's rural advocate for England from 2000 to 2004.

He was appointed High Sheriff of Somerset for 1986 and raised to a life peerage as Baron Cameron of Dillington in the County of Somerset on 29 June 2004, having been knighted in the 2003 New Year Honours.

He is a Fellow of the Royal Institution of Chartered Surveyors and of the Royal Agricultural Societies. Between 2010 and 2015, he was President of the Guild of Agricultural Journalists. He has been co-chair of the All-party Parliamentary Group on Agriculture and Food for Development, alongside Tony Baldry MP, since the 2010 election.

== Family ==
Lord Cameron married Caroline Anne Ripley in 1975, daughter of Horace Derek de Chapeaurouge Ripley, and has three sons and one daughter. His younger sister, Bride Donalda Elspeth Cameron (now Lady Donald Graham) is married to Lord Donald Graham, half-brother of James Graham, 8th Duke of Montrose.

== Arms ==
Coat of arms of Ewen Cameron, Baron Cameron of Dillington
Crest A sheaf of five arrows points upwards Proper charged of an escallop Or. Escutcheon Gules three bars Or in the honour point an escallop of the second. Supporters Dexter a wyvern wings addorsed and inverted Gules langued and supporting with the interior foot a long-shafted Lochaber axe Or; sinister a stag Gules gorged with a plain collar attached thereto a chain reflexed over the back Or. Motto Fortiter Sed Suaviter (Firmly But Agreeably)

Orders of precedence in the United Kingdom
Preceded by The Lord Rowlands	Gentlemen; Baron Cameron of Dillington	Followed by The Lord Griffiths of Burry Port
