= David Cameron (footballer, born 1902) =

Scottish footballer

Personal information
- Full name: David Cameron
- Date of birth: 25 June 1902
- Place of birth: Borthwick, Scotland
- Date of death: ?
- Position: Defender

Senior career*
Years	Team	Apps	(Gls)
1924–1925	Burntisland		
1925–1926	Heart of Midlothian		
1926–1927	Portsmouth	0	(0)
1927	Heart of Midlothian		
1927–1928	Dunfermline Athletic		
1928–1930	Nottingham Forest	21	(1)
1930	Colwyn Bay United		
1932–33	Lochgelly Amateurs		
Total		21	(1)
- * Club domestic league appearances and goals

David Cameron (25 June 1902 – unknown) was a Scottish footballer who played in the Football League for Nottingham Forest.
