= David Cameron (footballer, born 1895) =

Scottish footballer

Personal information
- Full name: David Fraser Cameron
- Date of birth: 12 September 1895
- Place of birth: Partick, Scotland
- Date of death: 27 July 1953 (aged 57)
- Place of death: Rhu, Scotland
- Height: 5 ft 11 in (1.80 m)
- Position: Wing half

Senior career*
Years	Team	Apps	(Gls)
1915–1920	Queen's Park	34	(3)
1920–1926	Chelsea	73	(2)
- Helensburgh
- * Club domestic league appearances and goals

David Fraser Cameron (12 September 1895 – 27 July 1953) was a Scottish professional footballer who played in the Football League for Chelsea as a wing half.

== Personal life ==
Cameron served in the Highland Light Infantry and the Queen's Own Cameron Highlanders during the First World War and rose to the rank of sergeant. His elder brother Macdonald, also a footballer for Queen's Park, was killed at Passchendaele in 1917.

== Career statistics ==
Appearances and goals by club, season and competition
Club	Season	League			National Cup		Other		Total	
Club	Season	Division	Apps	Goals	Apps	Goals	Apps	Goals	Apps	Goals
Queen's Park	1914–15	Scottish First Division	1	0	—		0	0	1	0
Queen's Park	1915–16	Scottish First Division	33	3	—		2 (Note: Appearances in Glasgow Merchants Charity Cup)	0	35	3
Queen's Park	Total		34	3	—		2	0	36	3
Chelsea	1920–21	First Division	13	2	5	0	—		18	2
Chelsea	1921–22	First Division	13	0	0	0	—		13	0
Chelsea	1922–23	First Division	25	0	3	0	—		28	0
Chelsea	1923–24	First Division	11	0	0	0	—		11	0
Chelsea	1924–25	Second Division	11	0	0	0	—		11	0
Chelsea	Total		73	2	8	0	—		81	2
Career total			107	5	8	0	2	0	117	5
