= Donald Hamish Cameron of Lochiel =

Scottish clan chief (1910–2004)

The Much Honoured Sir Donald Cameron of Lochiel KT CVO TD JP DL
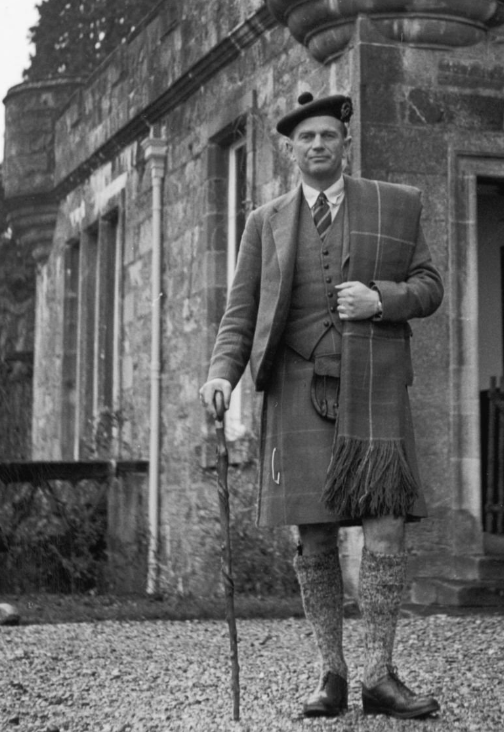
- The 26th Lochiel

Lord Lieutenant of Inverness
- In office 1971–1985
- Preceded by: The Lord Macdonald
- Succeeded by: Lachlan Mackintosh

Personal details
- Born: 12 September 1910 Buchanan Castle, Stirlingshire, Scotland
- Died: 26 May 2004 (aged 93) Achnacarry, Inverness-shire, Scotland
- Spouse: Margaret Gathorne-Hardy (m. 1939)
- Children: 4, including Donald
- Parent(s): Sir Donald Cameron of Lochiel; Lady Hermione Graham
- Education: Balliol College, Oxford

Military service
- Allegiance: United Kingdom
- Branch/service: British Army
- Years of service: 1929–1958
- Rank: Colonel
- Unit: Lovat Scouts; Queen's Own Cameron Highlanders
- Battles/wars: World War II: Italian campaign

Arms of Cameron of Lochiel

Colonel Sir Donald Hamish Cameron of Lochiel, KT, CVO, TD, JP, DL (12 September 1910 – 26 May 2004) was a British Army officer, landowner and the 26th Chief of Clan Cameron. He served as commanding officer of the Lovat Scouts throughout the Second World War. He succeeded his father as Chief of the Camerons in 1951 and later served as Lord Lieutenant of Inverness-shire.

== Early life ==
Born at Buchanan Castle near Drymen, Cameron was the eldest son of Col. Sir Donald Walter Cameron of Lochiel, and his wife, Lady Hermione Graham (1882–1978), daughter of Douglas Graham, 5th Duke of Montrose. After attending Harrow, the 19-year-old Cameron was commissioned as an officer in the Lovat Scouts before going to Balliol College, Oxford where he graduated as BA in 1933.

== Second World War ==
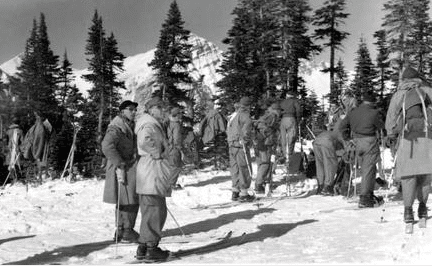
Lovat Scouts in Canada

At the outbreak of the Second World War in 1939, Lochiel joined his regiment on mobilisation and was promoted to Major. Lord Lovat, supported by Cameron, had devised the strategy of Commandos – elite, unorthodox shock raiders, modelled on old Boer soldiers. In 1940, the Commando Basic Training Centre (CBTC) was established. Between 1942 and 1946, over 25,000 allied personnel were trained at Achnacarry and it is widely believed that this was the birthplace of modern special forces.

In 1943, the Lovat Scouts underwent specialist ski and mountain training in the Rocky Mountains of Alberta, Canada before being sent to Italy. Arriving in Naples in 1944, Cameron fought in the aftermath of the infamous Battle of Monte Cassino, described as a scene of "utter and total devastation". He served with distinction for the remainder of the Italian campaign and was frequently mentioned in dispatches. Following the German surrender, the Lovat Scouts moved to Austria to hunt for fugitive Nazi and SS personnel before occupying the village of Ebene Eichenau in the Alps. He was promoted to lieutenant-colonel and then colonel in 1945. Cameron was then stationed in Greece before the regiment was disbanded in 1947.

Upon his former regiment's disbandment, he was transferred to the Queen's Own Cameron Highlanders, the ancestral regiment of the Camerons which had been founded in 1793 by Alan Cameron of Erracht. From 1958, Lochiel served as honorary colonel of the 4th and 5th Battalion of the Queen’s Own Cameron Highlanders (TA).

== Later life ==
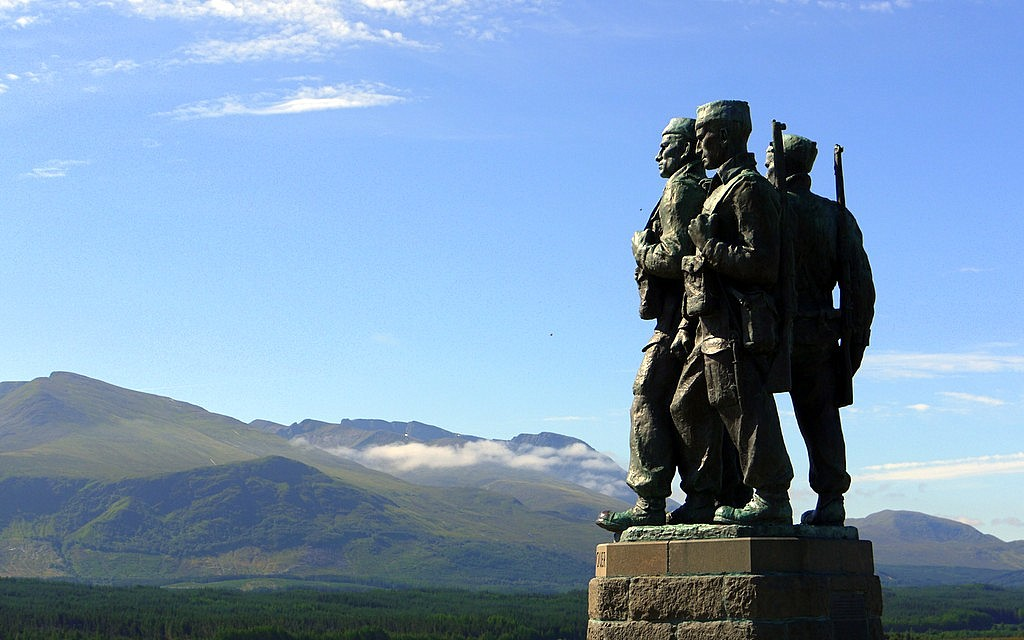
Commando Memorial, near Spean Bridge, Lochaber

After active service, Cameron worked in London as an accountant and qualified as FCA. He and his wife lived in Kensington, London before taking up residence at Achnacarry Castle upon his succession as Clan Chief in 1951 following the death of his father.

His experience as a chartered accountant helped with the restructuring of the Cameron estates, which were subject to considerable death duties upon the death of his father, Sir Donald Cameron, 25th Lochiel. Through the sale of Fassiefern and Drimsallie, as well as land on the north side of Loch Arkaig, Cameron successfully negotiated the austere post-war economic conditions, developing a sustainable future for the regional economy. By the time of his death in 2004, his estate comprised over 90,000 acres. His popularity in the Scottish Highlands saw him elected a County Councillor on Inverness County Council, serving until 1971.

Cameron was Chairman of Scottish Widows (Life Assurance) between 1964 and 1967, and Vice-chairman of the Royal Bank of Scotland from 1969 until 1980. He was also a Crown Estates Commissioner from 1957 until 1969, and President of the Scottish Landowners Federation (1979–85).

At the beginning of a biography of Lochiel's 18th-century great-uncle, Jacobite Army military chaplain and Roman Catholic Martyr Fr. Alexander Cameron, Monsignor Thomas J. Wynne wrote, "At a ceremony to inaugurate the new floodlighting for the Prince's Monument on an August evening in 1988 at the National Trust Centre, Glenfinnan, Lochiel addressed a large number of guests who had assembled for the occasion. He described briefly, from the wealth of oral and written tradition handed down in his family, what must have been the scene on the nineteenth of August 1745, when 1,500 Highlanders, among them 800 Camerons, gathered round the Prince's Standard, which was unfurled by the Duke of Tullibardine, and blessed by Bishop Hugh MacDonald of Morar, a relative of 'the Gentle Lochiel'. He mentioned in the address that he was very much aware of the criticisms concerning the wisdom of the '45 Rising, and the ensuing sufferings of so many innocent Highland people caused by the avenging troops of the Duke of Cumberland's victorious army, but with a deep legitimate pride, forged by generations of Cameron loyalty to the Stuart Cause, he spoke these words with such feeling that they struck a chord in the hearts of all his listeners: 'The Rising may have failed, but the Year of the Prince was a glorious year in our history, and we will never forget it!'"

He was Lord Lieutenant of Inverness-shire from 1971 to 1985. In 1973, he was honoured as a Knight of the Thistle (KT). Following his knighthood, Cameron's banner hung in St Giles' Cathedral, Edinburgh until his death in May, 2004.

== Family ==
In 1939, Lochiel married Margaret Doris Gathorne-Hardy (1913–2006), only daughter of Lt.-Col. The Hon. Nigel Gathorne-Hardy DSO (fourth son of the 2nd Earl of Cranbrook). They had four children:

- Margaret Anne Cameron (born 1942)
- Caroline Marion Cameron (1943–2019), married Blaise Hardman, son of Air Chief Marshal Sir Donald Hardman, and had issue.
- Donald Angus Cameron of Lochiel (1946–2023), married Lady Cecil Kerr, daughter of the 12th Marquess of Lothian, and had issue; including Lord Cameron of Lochiel, the current clan chief.
- John Alastair Nigel Cameron (born 1954)

== Honours ==
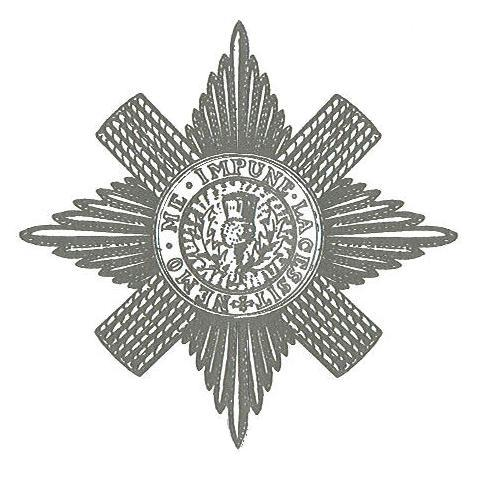
The Thistle Star

- – KT 1973
- – CVO 1970
- – KStJ 1974
- – TD 1944
- – 1939–1945 Star
- – Italy Star
- – Defence Medal
- – War Medal

Honorary titles
Preceded by The Lord Macdonald	Lord Lieutenant of Inverness-shire; 1971–1985	Succeeded by Lachlan Mackintosh, 29th of Mackintosh
