= Donald Walter Cameron of Lochiel =

Scottish clan chief and army officer (1876–1951)

Colonel Sir Donald Cameron of Lochiel KT CMG JP DL
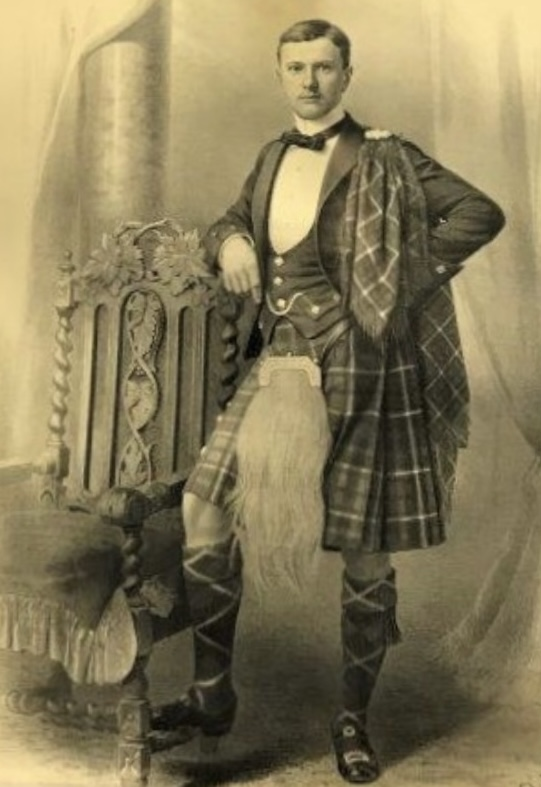
- Lochiel, c. 1899

Lord Lieutenant of Inverness
- In office 1939–1951
- Preceded by: Alfred Mackintosh
- Succeeded by: The Lord Macdonald

Personal details
- Born: 4 November 1876 Dalkeith Palace, Midlothian, Scotland
- Died: 11 October 1951 (aged 74) Inverness, Inverness-shire, Scotland
- Spouse: Lady Hermione Graham (m. 1906)
- Children: 5, including Donald and Allan
- Parents: Donald Cameron of Lochiel; Lady Margaret Montagu Douglas Scott

Military service
- Rank: Colonel
- Unit: Queen's Own Cameron Highlanders
- Battles/wars: Second Boer War; World War I

Colonel Sir Donald Walter Cameron of Lochiel, KT, CMG, JP, DL (4 November 1876 – 11 October 1951) was a British Army officer of the Queen's Own Cameron Highlanders and the 25th Chief of Clan Cameron.

== Early life ==
Lochiel was born at Dalkeith Palace on 4 November 1876, the eldest son of Donald Cameron of Lochiel, 24th Chief, and his wife, Lady Margaret Montagu Douglas Scott, daughter of Walter Montagu Douglas Scott, 5th Duke of Buccleuch. He had three brothers: Ewen, Allan and Archibald; two of whom would be killed during the First World War.

He was educated at Harrow and attended Royal Military Academy Sandhurst. Following his father's death in 1905, he succeeded as the 25th Chief ("Lochiel") of Clan Cameron and laird of Achnacarry Castle; which came with some 100,000 acres that included Ben Nevis.

== Career ==
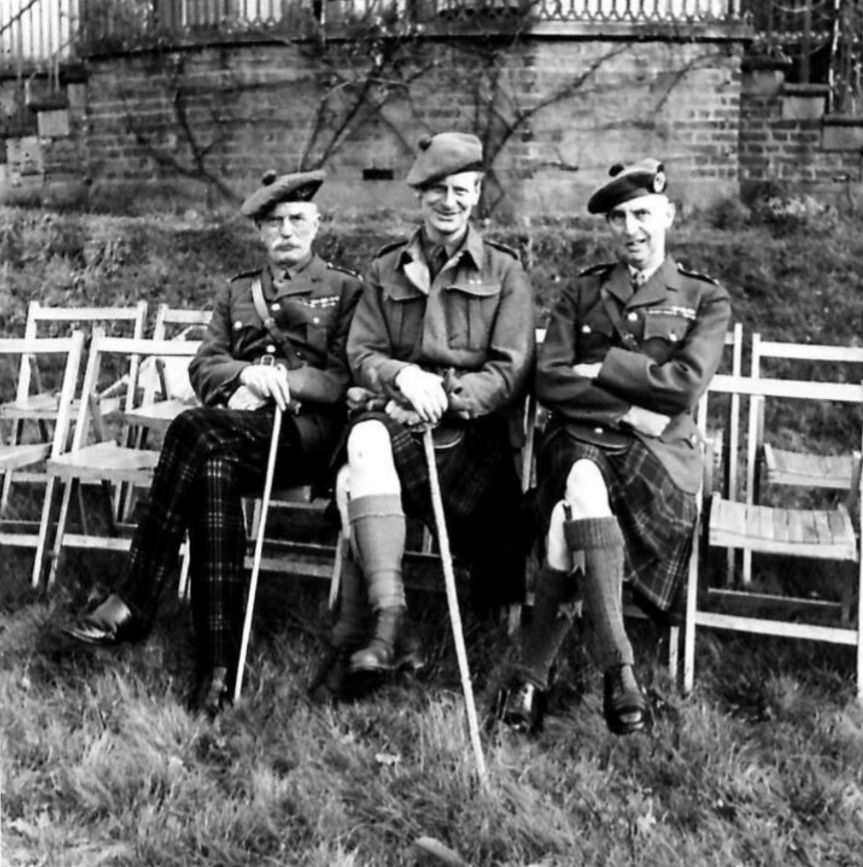
Cameron Highlander officers at an anniversary gathering in Hertford (Lochiel sits on left)

Cameron was commissioned as an officer in the Grenadier Guards on 5 September 1896, and promoted to lieutenant on 8 September 1898. He served in South Africa 1899-1900 during the Second Boer War, where he was part of the Kimberley relief force, and was wounded at the Battle of Belmont (November 1899). In 1901 he served as ADC to the Governor of Madras (Lord Ampthill) in India. He was in South Africa for the end of the war, and was invalided home in July 1902, when he left Cape Town on the SS Canada, returning to Southampton. Lochiel was back with his regiment the same month and promoted to Captain.

In 1914, Lochiel (who was then commanding officer of the 3rd Reserve Battalion of the Queen's Own Cameron Highlanders) was asked by Field Marshal Herbert Kitchener, 1st Earl Kitchener to raise several battalions of infantry; Lochiel agreed, on the condition that he would be Colonel; one of these became the 5th Service Battalion of the regiment, which saw distinguished service on the western front as part of the 9th (Scottish) Division. His brothers, Allan and Archibald Cameron, also served in the Cameron Highlanders but were both killed in 1914 and 1917. Their deaths and those of the many others serving under his command deeply affected him. He was invalided home, but resumed command of the 3rd Battalion in January 1918, when it was in Ireland.

From 1920 to 1936, he was aide-de-camp (ADC) to King George V. He was invested as a Knight of the Order of the Thistle (KT) in 1934, being the first non-peer or baronet to receive that honour. He held the office of Lord Lieutenant of Inverness-shire from 1939 until his death in 1951. On 1 February 1941, Lochiel was appointed Commander, Inverness Group of the Home Guard.

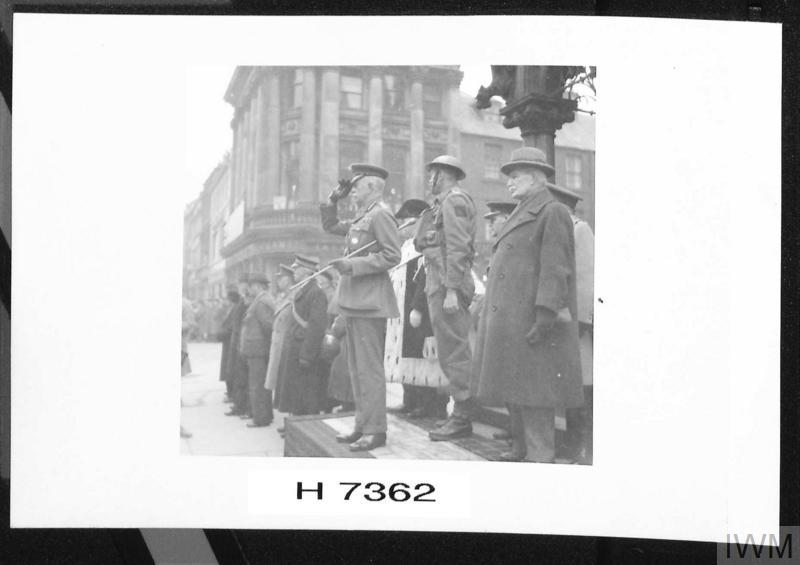
At Inverness, 1941

Lochiel travelled to North America several times: firstly with his wife in 1913, and again in 1923, returning in 1924. He was also a passionate advocate of the Scottish Gaelic revival and served as Chief, Gaelic society of Inverness (although he could not speak the language himself). He was also the first chief to organise Clan Cameron gatherings, which took place for the first time in 1938.

During the Second World War, he vacated his residence of Achnacarry to the military for 25,000 soldiers to undergo elite commando training between 1942 and 1945. Achnacarry, transformed into the Commando Basic Training Centre, was known to the soldiers as "Castle Commando".

== Family ==
In 1906, Lochiel married Lady Hermione Emily Graham (1882–1978), second daughter of Douglas Graham, 5th Duke of Montrose, and his wife, Violet Graham, Duchess of Montrose, daughter of Sir Frederick Graham, 3rd Baronet. They had the following issue:

- Violet Hermione Cameron (6 May 1907 – 24 March 1979), married Maj. John Stewart of Ardvorlich, and had issue.
- Col. Sir Donald Hamish Cameron of Lochiel KT (12 September 1910 – 4 May 2004), who succeeded; married Margaret Gathorne-Hardy, granddaughter of the Earl of Cranbrook, and had issue.
- Marion Hester Cameron (12 October 1914 – 31 May 1997), married Sir Ronald Orr-Ewing, 5th Baronet, and had issue.
- Maj. Allan John Cameron (25 March 1917 – 4 December 2011), married Elizabeth Vaughan-Lee; father of Lord Cameron of Dillington and a daughter who married a cousin, Lord Donald Graham, son of the 7th Duke of Montrose, and had issue.
- Lt.-Col. Charles Alexander Cameron (born 29 September 1920), married Felicia Macdonald, of Tote, Isle of Skye, and had issue.

== Coat of arms ==
Lochiel was recognised by the Lord Lyon King of Arms, and matriculated his arms at the Court of the Lord Lyon in 1934. As a Knight of the Thistle his arms are encircled by that insignia:

Arms of Sir Donald Walter Cameron of Lochiel, KT

== Bibliography ==
- Home Guard List 1941: Scottish Command. London, United Kingdom: Savannah Paperback Classics. 1941. ISBN 978-1902366258.
- Burke's Peerage, Baronetage & Knightage (107 ed.). Wilmington, Delaware, U.S.A: Burke's Peerage. 2003.

Honorary titles
Preceded by Alfred Mackintosh	Lord Lieutenant of Inverness-shire; 1939–1951	Succeeded by The Lord Macdonald
