= Christian Carl Magnussen =

German painter (1821–1896)

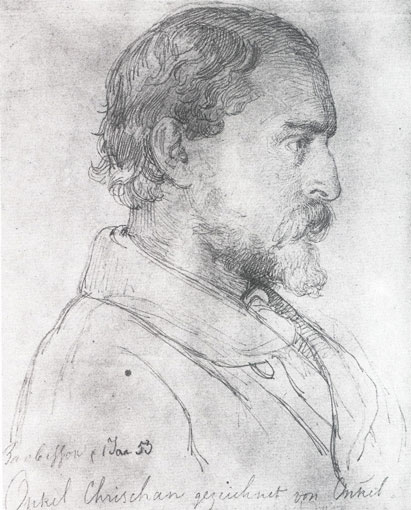
Christian Carl Magnussen; portrait by Lorenz Frølich (1853)

Christian Carl Magnussen (31 August 1821 – 18 July 1896) was a German painter, primarily of genre scenes.

== Biography ==
He was born in Bredstedt. He began his artistic career as a student of Herman Wilhelm Bissen at the Royal Danish Academy of Fine Arts in Copenhagen. From 1846 to 1848, he was in Rome, where he sketched and painted scenes from daily life. In 1848, when his application for a scholarship at the Academy was rejected, he became involved in the First Schleswig War, on the German side.

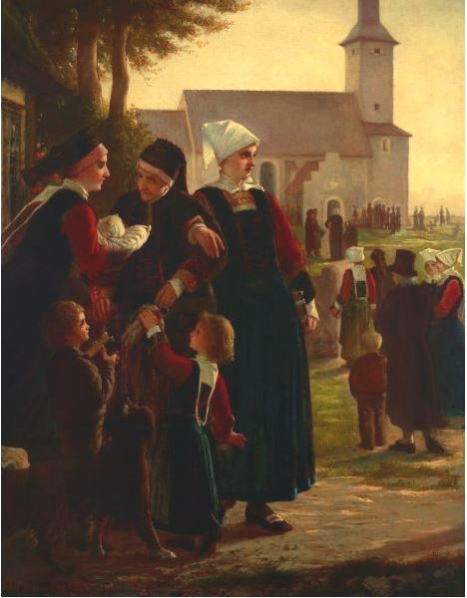
Ostenfeld Church, Sunrise

Following the Danish victory, he settled in Hamburg and became a portrait painter. There, he made the acquaintance of Georg Christian Lorenz Meyer, a local politician, and fell in love with his daughter, Meta. From 1851 to 1852, Meyer financed a stay in Paris for him, during which he studied with Thomas Couture. After returning, in 1853, he married Meta.

Her inheritance enabled them to live in Rome. They stayed for seven years altogether, during which time they held an almost continual open house. Their most notable frequent guests included the painters, Ludwig Knaus, Valentin Ruths, the brothers Gustav and Louis Spangenberg, as well as the art historian, Wilhelm Lübke. They were especially good friends with the poet, Hermann Allmers. Most of the works he created there were either idealized portraits of women or scenes from Italian folk life.

When relations between Austria and Italy became strained and war appeared imminent, he took his family back to Germany and settled in Hamburg, where he once again became a portrait painter. In 1875, they moved to Schleswig, which by then had become part of Germany. Instead of painting, he focused on operating a woodcarving school and attempting to revive the techniques of the "Old Masters". He also worked on restoring carvings in churches throughout the area, but it is now the general opinion that his rigorous restorations robbed the works of their value as historical items.

His activities included collecting furniture and various church pieces; over 500 in all. In 1894, when his school had proven to be financially unsuccessful, he placed his collection in the new Museum of Applied Arts in Copenhagen, as an exhibition for sale. It was purchased in its entirety by Ernest Augustus, Crown Prince of Hanover, and is now on exhibition as part of the "Cumberland Collection" at Sønderborg Castle Another significant part had been acquired by Justus Brinckmann in 1887 for display at the Museum für Kunst und Gewerbe Hamburg.

Altogether, he had sixteen children from two marriages; including the sculptor Harro Magnussen, the ceramicist Walter Magnussen, and the painter and writer, Ingeborg Magnussen

Magnussen died in 1896 in Schleswig.
