= Duncan Mackintosh, 11th of Mackintosh =

Scottish clan chief (died 1496)

Duncan Mackintosh, 11th of Mackintosh (died 1496) was chief of the Clan Mackintosh, a Scottish clan of the Scottish Highlands. He was also chief of the confederation of clans that was known as the Clan Chattan.

== Early life ==
Duncan Mackintosh, 11th of Mackintosh was the eldest son of Malcolm Beg Mackintosh, 10th of Mackintosh and his wife, Mora, daughter of MacDonald, 1st of Moydart. During his father's chiefship, Duncan led an expedition against their rivals the Clan Cameron which had resulted in the Battle of Craig Cailloch in 1441. Also, before he became chief, he had fought a successful battle at Culloden against Gillespie MacDonald, brother of John of Islay, Earl of Ross who had stolen cattle from the Mackintosh lands of Petty.

== Chief of Clan Mackintosh and Clan Chattan ==
During his time as chief of the clan he had been relatively quiet and had been in favour with both the king and the Lord of the Isles. Upon the first forfeiture of the Lordship of the Isles and its annexation of the Earldom of Ross to the Crown, James IV of Scotland granted a charter to Duncan dated 4 July 1476. It read: "dilecto nostro Duncano Mackintosh, Capitano de Clan Chattan, terrarum de Moymore, Fern, Clumglassen, Stroneroy, Auchenroy" and others in Lochaber.

In 1466, Duncan had obtained a charter from John, then Lord of the Isles and Earl of Ross, for the lands of Keppoch and all of the Brae of Lochaber, and in 1493 this was confirmed by charter from the king. This was on the final forfeiture of the Lordship of the Isles when Duncan and other chiefs met the king and formally submitted to him.

Duncan also seems to have been on excellent terms with his neighbours, including an indenture of friendship in 1467 with William, Lord Forbes and Rose of Kilravock. When a dispute arose with Hucheon Rose of Kilravock in 1479, instead of taking to arms, the matter was resolved peacefully through arbitration, with Kilravock judged to be in the right. Two years later another band of was executed between Duncan Mackintosh and Kilravock in which all debates would be referred to George Gordon, 2nd Earl of Huntly. In 1490, another band was entered into where the potential daughter of Duncan's son Ferquhard would be married to Kilravock's son. However, the friendship between Duncan and the Clan Rose does not seem to have been shared by some of his family: On 15 May 1482, at Inverness, an agreement was made between Duncan's brother, Lachlan "Badenoch" Mackintosh, Hucheon Rose's wife and "Donald M'Intoshe Angusson" to the effect that Hucheon Rose, baron of Kilravock, had no right or title to Kilravock Castle. Donald accordingly attacked Kilravock Castle, killing the constable and watchman, and doing some considerable damage. It is recorded in the Genealogical Deduction of the Family of Kilravock which was written 1683–4, that the Mackintoshes were ejected and that a royal summons was made against Donald.

Also, although Duncan as chief was at peace with his neighbours, his son and heir, Ferquhard, was not. Ferquhard took part in Alexander MacDonald of Lochalsh's insurrection of 1491, the Raid on Ross. Ferquhard also subsequently took Inverness Castle using a "sow". The king later imprisoned Ferquhard, along with Kenneth Mackenzie, 8th of Kintail, in Edinburgh Castle. Two years later they escaped, but Mackenzie was killed by the Laird of Buchanan and Ferquard was recaptured and imprisoned in Dunbar Castle where he remained for sixteen years until being released after the Battle of Flodden in 1513.

Chief Duncan Mackintosh having not taken part in Lochalsh's insurrection remained on good terms with the king. However, the Mackintosh's own 17th century Kinrara manuscript states that he had repaired Inverness Castle after his son Duncan had captured it in 1491, remaining in it until Alexander, Lord Gordon was given governorship of it by the king in 1495 and made Sheriff of Inverness.

Duncan Mackintosh, 11th of Mackintosh died in 1496, the year following his son's imprisonment, at the age of eighty-four. He was buried at Greyfriars Church, Inverness.

== Family ==
Duncan Mackintosh, 11th of Mackintosh had married Flora or Florence, natural daughter of Alexander of Islay, Earl of Ross. Their only surviving child was their son, Ferquhard Mackintosh, 12th of Mackintosh. They had several other children but they all predeceased Duncan.

== See also ==
- Chiefs of Clan Mackintosh
