= Ferquhard Mackintosh, 12th of Mackintosh =

Scottish clan chief (died 1514)

Ferquhard Mackintosh, 12th of Mackintosh (died 1514) was the chief of the Clan Mackintosh, a Scottish clan of the Scottish Highlands. He was also chief of the confederation of clans known as the Clan Chattan.

== Early life ==
Ferquhard Mackintosh, 12th of Mackintosh was the only surviving child of Duncan Mackintosh, 11th of Mackintosh and his wife, Flora or Florence, second daughter of Alexander of Islay, Earl of Ross. During his father Duncan's chiefship, Ferquhard had taken part in Alexander MacDonald of Lochalsh's insurrection of 1491, the Raid on Ross. Ferquhard also subsequently took Inverness Castle using a "sow". The king later imprisoned Ferquhard, along with Kenneth Mackenzie, 8th of Kintail, in Edinburgh Castle. Two years later they escaped, but Mackenzie was killed by the Laird of Buchanan and Ferquhard was recaptured and imprisoned in Dunbar Castle where he remained for sixteen years until being released after the Battle of Flodden. During the years that Ferquhard was in prison, the affairs of his clan were administered by William Mackintosh who was the eldest son of Lachlan "Badenoch" Mackintosh who was in turn the second son of Malcolm Beg Mackintosh, 10th of Mackintosh.

In 1492, Alan Cameron, chief of Clan Cameron had entered into a bond of alliance with Ferquhard Mackintosh in his absence. However, notwithstanding this, the Camerons, aided by the Clan Gregor and MacDonalds of Glencoe, invaded the Braes of Badenoch and Strathnairn and harried the Clan Chattan lands in those districts. The acting chief, William, proceeded to take revenge: firstly by raiding the lands of Rannoch and Appin which belonged to the MacGregors and MacDonalds of Glencoe. Secondly, by sailing up Loch Ness and at night time laying waste to some of the Cameron lands by surprise, returning home before they had time to retaliate.

During Dubh's Rebellion of 1503–04, the Mackintoshes and Clan Chattan supported the royal side, opposing the rebels.

== Chief of Clan Mackintosh and Clan Chattan ==
After the death of James IV of Scotland at Flodden in 1513, Ferquhard Mackintosh was finally released from prison. According to the Mackintosh's own 17th century Kinrara manuscript he was received by 1,800 men of the Clan Chattan in Inverness who had been mustered there by his cousin, William. On 8 October 1514, Ferquhard died at Inverness, having only been free and at the head of his clan for a few months.

== Family ==
Ferquhard had married Giles, daughter of Hugh Fraser, 1st Lord Lovat. They had one son, Donald, who died in infancy and four daughters who married respectively to Guthrie of that Ilk, Strachan of Glenkindy, Alaster mac Alan, the Captain of Clan Macdonald of Clanranald, and Ian Shaw of Rothimurcus. Ferquhard also had two natural sons by a lady of Dunbar; Hector Mackintosh who was later the tutor of William Mackintosh, 15th of Mackintosh and William Mackintosh who was later executed at Forres. He was therefore succeeded as chief by William Mackintosh, 13th of Mackintosh who was the son of Lachlan "Badenoch" Mackintosh and who had taken care of the clan during Ferquhard's imprisonment.

== See also ==
- Chiefs of Clan Mackintosh
