= William Mackintosh, 13th of Mackintosh =

Scottish clan chief (died 1515)

William Mackintosh, 13th of Mackintosh (died 1515) was the chief of the Clan Mackintosh, a Scottish clan of the Scottish Highlands. He was also chief of the confederation of clans that was known as the Clan Chattan.

== Early life ==
William Mackintosh, 13th of Mackintosh was the son of Lachlan "Badenoch" Mackintosh who in turn was the second son of Malcolm Beg Mackintosh, 10th of Mackintosh.

Ferquhard Mackintosh, 12th of Mackintosh had taken part in Alexander MacDonald of Lochalsh's insurrection of 1491, the Raid on Ross. Ferquhard also subsequently took Inverness Castle using a "sow". The king later imprisoned Ferquhard, along with Kenneth Mackenzie, 8th of Kintail, in Edinburgh Castle. Two years later they escaped, but Mackenzie was killed by the Laird of Buchanan and Ferquhard was recaptured and imprisoned in Dunbar Castle where he remained for sixteen years until being released after the Battle of Flodden in 1513. During the years that Ferquhard was in prison, the affairs of his clan were administered by William Mackintosh who was the eldest son of Lachlan "Badenoch" Mackintosh who was in turn the second son of Malcolm Beg Mackintosh, 10th of Mackintosh. Ferquhard Mackintosh, 12th of Mackintosh died a few months after being released from prison and so the chiefship of his clan fell to William who had taken care of it during Ferquhard's imprisonment.

In 1492, Alan Cameron, chief of Clan Cameron had entered into a bond of alliance with Ferquhard Mackintosh in his absence. However, notwithstanding this, the Camerons, aided by the Clan Gregor and MacDonalds of Glencoe, invaded the Braes of Badenoch and Strathnairn and harried the Clan Chattan lands in those districts. The acting chief, William, proceeded to take revenge: firstly by raiding the lands of Rannoch and Appin which belonged to the MacGregors and MacDonalds of Glencoe. Secondly, by sailing up Loch Ness and at night time laying waste to some of the Cameron lands by surprise, returning home before they had time to retaliate.

During Dubh's Rebellion of 1503–04, the Mackintoshes and Clan Chattan supported the royal side, opposing the rebels.

== Chief of Clan Mackintosh and Clan Chattan ==
William Mackintosh, 13th chief, having become chief in 1514, had been married for some years but was without children, and his brother Lachlan was unmarried. This gave hope to their kinsman, John "Ruaidh", grandson of Alan mac Malcolm Beg, that he might become chief of the clan, which failing the issue of William and Lachlan, he would be entitled to receive. John collected a faction around himself that included some his cousins, the Frasers, and began disputing with William his right to the whole clan lands, demanding for himself the lands of Meikle Geddes. William refused this and John prepared to take force when he learned that chief William was lying sick at a house in Inverness. Gaining entrance to the house, John murdered William in his bed on 22 May 1515. John was however discovered and had to flee to safety. They were followed by a party under Dougal Mor Mac Gillichallum and his son Ferquhard into Caithness, through Strathnaver, Assynt, Lochalsh, Abertarff, Strathspey, Strathdee and finally Glenesk where they were overtaken and "cut to pieces".

During William's time as chief the family had received two important additions: In 1502, he had succeeded to the heritable right of Gellovie in Badenoch, which his father had obtained from George Gordon, 2nd Earl of Huntly in 1481. In December 1502, William had also acquired the barony of Dunachton which had previously fallen on two sisters as co-heiresses. One of these was Isabel Macnevan or Macniven who William had married in 1497. From this barony the chiefs of Clan Mackintosh have often been styled as "of Dunachton".

William had no legitimate children but did have two natural sons, one of whom, Donald Glas, was the ancestor of the Mackintosh of Strone cadet branch. The chiefship therefore devolved upon William's brother, Lachlan Beg Mackintosh, 14th of Mackintosh.

== See also ==
- Chiefs of Clan Mackintosh
