= Malcolm Beg Mackintosh, 10th of Mackintosh =

Scottish clan chief (died 1457)

Malcolm Beg Mackintosh (died 1457) was the tenth chief of the Clan Mackintosh, a Scottish clan of the Scottish Highlands. He was also chief of the confederation of clans known as the Clan Chattan.

== Ancestry ==
Malcolm Beg Mackintosh, 10th of Mackintosh was the son of William Mackintosh, 7th of Mackintosh and his second wife late in life, Margaret MacLeod. Malcolm had succeeded as chief of the Clan Mackintosh because Ferquhard Mackintosh, 9th chief had abdicated as chief of the clan and his three sons were consequently cut off from the succession. They took surnames other than Mackintosh and left descendants of their own. From his shortness of stature, Malcolm received the cognomen "Beg".

== Clan warfare ==
Malcolm Beg Mackintosh, 10th of Mackintosh supported Donald of Islay, Lord of the Isles at the Battle of Harlaw in 1411 against Robert Stewart, Duke of Albany in dispute over the Earldom of Ross. There is a tradition that Malcolm Beg Mackintosh and Hector Maclean, chief of the Clan Maclean, were both killed at the battle in a duel with each other and this is supported by 15th-16th century historian Hector Boece. However, according to 19th-century historian Alexander Mackintosh-Shaw the evidence is against this and that Malcolm Beg Mackintosh actually died in 1457 which was forty-five years after the Battle of Harlaw, quoting charters granted to Malcolm in 1443, 1447 and 1456 to back this up, and also the Mackintosh's own manuscript history.

In 1427–28, James I of Scotland visited Inverness for the purpose of building a Justice Court and made Malcolm Beg Mackintosh the Constable of Inverness Castle. In 1429, Alexander of Islay, Earl of Ross, in rebellion against the king, burnt Inverness but was not able to take the castle from Mackintosh. The Clan Mackintosh and their confederation of Clan Chattan were subsequently part of the royal army at the Battle of Lochaber in 1429 that fought against Alexander of Islay, Earl of Ross. This was followed by the Battle of Palm Sunday between the Mackintoshes and Clan Chattan against their long standing rivals, the Clan Cameron and which is mentioned in several accounts such as Walter Bower (c. 1385–1449) in his work Scotichronicon, John Major (1467–1550) in his History of Greater Britain and George Buchanan (1506–1582) in his History of Scotland, Rerum Scoticarum Historia. Mackintosh's men who had formed part of the royal army that opposed Dòmhnall Ballach Mac Dhòmhnaill of Clan Donald, had been sent to Ardnamurchan and so were not in the subsequent Battle of Inverlochy in 1431.

A feud with the Camerons over land continued and in 1441 the Mackintoshes fought them at the Battle of Craig Cailloch where Malcolm Beg Mackintosh's second son Lachlan was wounded and his fourth son, Gillichallum was killed.

The Clan Mackintosh feuded with the Clan Comyn: Rait Castle was originally a property of the Comyn family, who took the name of de Rait. The castle later passed from the de Raits to the Mackintoshes and then to the Clan Campbell of Cawdor. In 1442, when the castle passed to the Mackintoshes from the de Rait family, a feast was held at the castle between the two families which ended in the slaughter of most of the Comyns and de Raits. The laird blamed his daughter, whom he chased around the castle. She climbed out of a window but he chopped off her hands and she fell to her death. The castle is said to be haunted by her ghost, with no hands.

In 1452, five years before his death, Malcolm Beg Mackintosh being "old and unable for public employment" and now being allied to the Earl of Ross, James II of Scotland on hearing of the confederacy between the Earl of Douglas and John of Islay, Earl of Ross (the successor of Alexander), gave custody of Inverness Castle to one Crichton, and it was taken from him three years later by the Earl of Ross.

In 1454, occurred the Battle of Clachnaharry against the Clan Munro after the Munros, returning from a cattle raid, had passed Mackintosh's seat at Moyhall without paying to Mackintosh a share of the booty or road callop for passing through his dominions. The earliest account of this battle which was written by 17th-century historian Sir Robert Gordon, 1st Baronet states that the Mackintosh chief was killed, and many later accounts follow Gordon with this. However, the Mackintosh's own 17th century Kinrara manuscript does not agree with this. The Mackintosh manuscript shows that Malcolm Beg Mackintosh was not present at the battle and that it was one of his grandsons who was also called Malcolm Mackintosh who had pursued the Munros, but that this Malcolm Mackintosh had not actually been involved in the battle either, subsequently marrying Janet Munro, sister of John Munro of Milntown who had led the Munros on this expedition.

According to Alexander Mackintosh-Shaw, Malcolm Beg Mackintosh died in 1457.

== Family ==
Malcolm Beg Mackintosh, 10th of Mackintosh had married Mora, daughter of MacDonald, 1st of Moydart and had the following children:

1. Duncan Mackintosh, 11th of Mackintosh (heir and successor).
2. Lachlan, surnamed "Badenoch", who died in 1493 leaving descendants including William Mackintosh, 13th of Mackintosh and his brother Lachlan Beg Mackintosh, 14th of Mackintosh.
3. Alan Mackintosh, 1st of the Mackintosh of Killachie cadet branch.
4. Malcolm Mackintosh or Gillichallum, who was killed at the Battle of Craig Cailloch against the Camerons in 1441. He left two sons: Malcolm Og Mackintosh who had apparently pursued the Munros prior to the Battle of Clachnaharry in 1454 and subsequently married the sister of John Munro of Milntown, and Dougal Mor or "Mac Gillichallum".
5. Muriel, married Sir Duncan Grant of Freuchie.
6. Mora, married Hucheon Rose of Kilravock.
7. Janet, married Patrick Mac Ian Roy, half-brother of Sir Duncan Grant.
8. Margaret, married Hector Mac Tearlich, chieftain of Clan Tearlach (the Macleans of Dochgarroch and Clan Chattan).
9. Moniach, married Alexander Fraser.

== See also ==
- Chiefs of Clan Mackintosh
