= Chiefs of Clan Mackintosh =

The following table is a list of chiefs of the Clan Mackintosh, a Highland Scottish clan. The 6th chief of Clan Mackintosh also became through marriage, the 7th chief of Clan Chattan, a confederation of Scottish clans that Mackintosh chief was chief of until 1938.

Name (+ Gaelic Name)	Died	Further info
John Lachlan Mackintosh of Mackintosh, 31st chief	Alive	Resides in Singapore, where he worked as a History teacher at Nanyang Girls' High School until 2022.
Lachlan Ronald Duncan Mackintosh, 30th chief	1995	Served in the Royal Navy, with the rank of Lieutenant-Commander. Later served as a JP and was Deputy Lieutenant of Inverness-shire and Lord Lieutenant of Lochaber, Inverness, Badenoch and Strathspey. A Fellow of the Society of Antiquaries of Scotland.
Lachlan Donald Mackintosh, 29th chief	1957	Served in the Royal Navy, and commanded the destroyer HMS Medea in World War I, and went on to command the light cruiser Charybdis and the aircraft carriers Eagle, Victorious and Implacable during World War II, retiring with the rank of Vice-Admiral in 1950.
Alfred Donald Mackintosh, 28th chief	1938	Officer in the Highland Light Infantry and later commanding officer of 3rd (Militia) Battalion of the Cameron Highlanders. Convener of Inverness-shire County Council, Lord Lieutenant of Inverness 1905 – 1938
Alexander Æneas Mackintosh, 27th chief	1875	Commanded 10th Roy Bridge Company, 1st Administrative Battalion, Inverness-shire Rifle Volunteers, known as Mackintosh's Company. Married a daughter of Sir Fredrick Graham of Netherby in 1875.
Alexander Mackintosh, 26th chief	1861	Continued his father's trading business. Fought in the War of American Independence, saving a garrison on Lake Huron from starvation after running a gauntlet of fire from American riflemen on both sides of the River St Claire. Later returned to Scotland with his father where he succeeded as chief.
Angus Mackintosh, 25th chief	1833	Succeeded his brother as chief. Set out to Detroit in 1777 after the American War of Independence and became a successful merchant in the Indian trade. In 1799 moved across the Detroit River into Upper Canada and built a house called Moy Hall near Sandwich. Married Archange St Martin, daughter of an officer of the French Army. Later returned to Scotland and died at Daviot House.
Alexander Mackintosh, 24th chief	1827	Succeeded his second cousin as chief. Eldest son of Duncan Mackintosh of Castle Leathers. Became a merchant in Jamaica, built a house there called Moy Hall. Later returned to Scotland and built Daviot House on the bank of the River Nairn.
Aneas Mackintosh, 23rd chief	1820	Succeeded his uncle as chief. Raised a company of men for the 2nd Battalion of Frasers Highlanders under Simon Fraser of Lovat to fight in the Wars of American Independence. Fought at the Battle of Brooklyn. Built the third Moy Hall in Scotland after the second one burnt down.
Angus Mackintosh, 22nd chief	1770	Succeeded his brother as chief. Held a commission in the British Black Watch regiment under King George II of Great Britain, however his clan supported the Jacobite cause under the leadership of his wife, Lady Anne Farquharson-MacKintosh while he was away on duty, and Angus was not with his clansmen who fought as Jacobites at the Battle of Culloden.
William Mackintosh, 21st chief	1740	Succeeded his second cousin as chief, grandson of the 17th chief. Married Christian Menzies of Castle Menzies.
Lachlan Mackintosh, 20th chief	1731	Supported the Jacobite rebellion of 1715, was captured and imprisoned along with his kinsmen, William Mackintosh of Borlum at the Battle of Preston (1715). Borlum escaped to France after five months in prison. He later returned to Scotland in 1719 and was present at the Battle of Glenshiel where the Jacobites were defeated by government forces. Lachlan Mackintosh was released from prison in 1716. On 21 January 1717 he was created Lord Mackintosh in the Jacobite peerage.
Lachlan Mackintosh, 19th chief	1704	Continued to dispute with the Camerons the lands of Glenoy and Loch Arkaig. Was captured by MacDonalds at the Battle of Mulroy in 1688 but was later rescued by the Clan Macpherson. Was presented with the sword used by Viscount Dundee who was killed at the Battle of Killiecrankie in 1689. The sword is now preserved in Moy Hall.
William Mackintosh, 18th chief	1660	Succeeded as chief aged nine. Later supported the King during the Civil War. Was made a Lieutenant under James Graham, 1st Marquess of Montrose in 1644. Died soon after The Restoration of King Charles II.
Lachlan Mackintosh, 17th chief.	1622	Succeeded in minority under the tutorship of his uncle, William Mackintosh of Benchar who reunited the Chattan Confederation under a bond of union in 1609. Lachlan Mackintosh was knighted by the King in 1617.
Lachlan Mor Mackintosh, 16th chief	1606	Succeeded as chief in 1550, aged seven, only son of William. Brought up by the Mackenzies. Said to have joined the Munros and Frasers in taking Inverness Castle on behalf of Mary, Queen of Scots in 1562. Fought at the Battle of Corrichie against the Earl of Huntly.. First chief to be buried at Petty, which became the hereditary burial ground for Mackintosh chiefs. Married a daughter of Mackenzie of Kintail. His younger son, William, founded the Mackintosh of Borlum branch.
William Mackintosh, 15th chief	1550	Aged three when his father died, he was brought up by his uncle, the Earl of Moray which led to a feud between the Earl and the tutor Hector Mackintosh, son of Ferquhard Mackintosh, 12th chief. William became chief in 1540, however he was accused by Lachlan Mackintosh, the son of the man who murdered his father of conspiring to kill the Earl of Huntly. William Mackintosh, 15th chief was therefore executed in 1550.
Lachlan Beg Mackintosh, 14th chief	1524	Younger brother of William Mackintosh, 13th chief. Married Jean Gordon, daughter of Alexander Gordon of Lochinvar. Murdered by his nephew, John, son of his half brother, Malcolm in 1524.
William Mackintosh, 13th chief	1515	Son of Lachlan "Badenoch" Mackintosh who in turn was the second son of Malcolm Beg Mackintosh, 10th of Mackintosh. Murdered by his kinsman, John "Ruaidh" Mackintosh, grandson of Alan mac Malcolm Beg.
Ferquhard Mackintosh, 12th chief	1514	Whilst under his father's chiefship, joined Alexander MacDonald of Lochalsh during the Raid on Ross in 1491 and was imprisoned along with Mackenzie of Kintail in Edinburgh Castle in 1495. Ferquhard is said to have escaped but was later captured and imprisoned again until being released after the Battle of Flodden in 1513.
Duncan Mackintosh, 11th chief	1496	Son of Malcolm Beg Mackintosh, 10th chief. He married Florence Macdonald, daughter of Alexander of Islay, Earl of Ross.
Malcolm Beg Mackintosh, 10th chief	1457	Son of William Mackintosh, 7th chief. Supported Donald of the Isles at the Battle of Harlaw in 1411 as commander of the left flank. A younger son of Malcolm's founded the Mackintosh of Killachie cadet branch.
Ferquhard Mackintosh, 9th chief		In 1409 abdicated from his clan and gave up the claims of his sons to succeed as chiefs after just two years as chief. He kept only the lands of Kyllachy and Corrnuvoy in Strathdearn, which his family held for the next two hundred years.
Lachlan Mackintosh, 8th chief	1407	Fought in battle against the Clan Cameron in 1370. Too old to fight at the Battle of the North Inch in 1396, where the men of Chattan were led by Shaw Mackintosh.
William Mackintosh, 7th chief	1368	Began the feud with the Clan Cameron and fought against the English at the Battle of Neville's Cross in 1346.
Angus Mackintosh, 6th chief of Clan Mackintosh and 7th chief of the Clan Chattan	1345	Brought up in the court of his uncle, Alexander Og MacDonald, Lord of Islay. Fought against the English at the Battle of Bannockburn in 1314, under Randolph, Earl of Moray. His lands of Meikle Geddes, Rait Castle and Inverness Castle were taken by the Clan Comyn. Married Eva, the daughter of Gilpatric Dougal Dall, the 6th chief of Clan Chattan. After Gilpatric's death Angus became chief of both Clan Mackintosh and Clan Chattan.
Ferquhard Mackintosh, 5th chief	1274	Fought in support of Alexander III of Scotland against the Norwegians. Killed in a duel in 1274.
Shaw Mackintosh, 4th chief	1265	Son of Ferqhuard, 3rd chief's brother. Acquired the Castle of Rait and the lands of Meikle Geddes.
Ferquhard Mackintosh, 3rd chief	1220	Brought up by his kinsman, Malcolm, Earl of Fife in an agreement with Bishop Moray. Quoted as Senschal of Badenoch.
Shaw Mackintosh, 2nd chief	1210	Received confirmation of his father's lands from King William. Made Chamberlain of the Crown Revenues.
Shaw MacDuff, 1st chief	1179	Shaw MacDuff is said to have taken the name Mackintosh and was made keeper of Inverness Castle. Son of the 3rd Earl of Fife, said to descend from Ferchar Fader son of Ferndach, King of Dál Riata who died in 697.
