= Battle of Sunday =

The Battle of Sunday may refer to:

- the Battle of Sunday (Middle Welsh: Waith Dyw Sul, AD 870s) between Rhodri the Great and Saxons (probably from Mercia) on Anglesey
- the Battle of Palm Sunday (1429) between Clan Cameron and the Chattan Confederation in the Scottish Highlands
- the Easter Sunday Raid (1942) between the Imperial Japanese and British navies off Ceylon (modern Sri Lanka)
