= William Mackintosh, 15th of Mackintosh =

Scottish clan chief (died 1550)

William Mackintosh, 15th of Mackintosh (died 1550) was the chief of the Clan Mackintosh, a Scottish clan of the Scottish Highlands. He was also chief of the confederation of clans that was known as the Clan Chattan.

== Early life ==
William Mackintosh, 15th of Mackintosh was the son of Lachlan Beg Mackintosh, 14th of Mackintosh and his wife Jean Gordon, daughter of Sir Alexander Gordon of Lochinvar. His father, Lachlan Beg Mackintosh, had been murdered in 1524 when William was just three years old. Therefore, Hector Mackintosh, natural son of Ferquhard Mackintosh, 12th chief was chosen as his tutor and temporary leader of the clan. Hector's leadership was not universally acknowledged by the clan and as a result the Earl of Moray who was also a relation of William had him and his mother removed to his own house. He also arranged for William's mother to re-marry to Margaret Ogilvie, sister of James Ogilvie of Cardell.

The newly elected leader of the Clan Mackintosh and Clan Chattan, Hector, with the support of the clan saw the Earl's actions as an insult to themselves to use their young chief for his own designs. The removal of their chief was resented so much that the clan invaded the Earl of Moray's lands and during the year 1527 the Earl's tenants were in a perpetual state of alarm constantly having their crops in flames and their cattle lifted. Subsequently, a royal mandate was issued on 9 November 1528 for the extermination of the invading Clan Chattan, during the reign of James V of Scotland. It was addressed to the sheriffs of Kincardine, Aberdeen, Banff, Elgin, Forres, Nairn and Inverness and to the Earl of Moray himself, who was lieutenant general of the north. It was also issued to the Earls of Sutherland and Caithness, John Lord Forbes, Hugh Fraser, 3rd Lord Lovat, John Grant of Freuchy, Ewen the Captain of Clan Cameron and John Mackenzie, 9th of Kintail, all to attack and kill the Clan Chattan.

According to 19th historian Alexander Mackintosh-Shaw, if this mandate had been acted upon by all of the persons to whom it was addressed, then the history of the Clan Chattan would have probably been ended. However, owing to the friendly efforts of chiefs in the north and the unwillingness of the Earl of Moray to take such extremities, it was not. It did however stop the Clan Chattan from invading the Earl of Moray's lands. The leader of the clan, Hector Mackintosh, is not mentioned in these disturbances which seem to have been carried out by the clansmen. Two years later the Earl of Moray marched into Mackintosh country and took 300 prisoners, many of whom were executed including Hector's brother, also called William. Hector escaped and remained for some time in hiding. Upon the advice of Dunbar, Dean of Moray, Hector surrendered himself to the king who forgave him for past offences and placed him in royal favour and this may have been because at the time the king was dissatisfied with the Earl of Moray.

== Chief of Clan Mackintosh and Clan Chattan ==
The misfortunes of the tutor Hector's quarrel with the Earl of Moray that had been brought upon the clan appear to have been of a temporary nature and William Mackintosh, 15th chief took up his position as head of the clan in about 1540, aged nineteen.

In 1544, the Clan Chattan became involved in the dispute over the chiefship of the Clan Macdonald of Clanranald. The son of the previous chief of Clan Ranald was John of Moidart who was challenged by his relative, Ranald, who was married to a daughter of Hugh Fraser, 3rd Lord Lovat who in turn gave Ranald his support. George Gordon, 4th Earl of Huntly was the king's lieutenant in the north and also supported Ranald and Fraser of Lovat, who together with the Clan Grant and Clan Chattan marched against John of Moidart. On this occasion William Mackintosh, chief of Clan Mackintosh and Clan Chattan, was followed by 1500 men. The Gordons, Grants, Mackintoshes and Clan Chattan separated from Lord Lovat's force. Lovat and his clan were defeated by John of Moidart in the subsequent Battle of the Shirts in which it is said that only eight MacDonalds and four or five Frasers survived, with John of Moidart succeeding in his claim to the chiefship of Clan Macdonald of Clanranald.

== Execution ==
In 1547-48, the Earldom of Moray was conferred upon the Earl of Huntly. William Mackintosh, 15th of Mackintosh was inclined to support the doctrine of the Reformation which Huntly was a staunch opponent to. According to 19th-century historian Alexander Mackintosh-Shaw, chief William Mackintosh commanded a following more numerous than Huntly could raise from his own estate and Huntly deprived Mackintosh of his office of deputy lieutenant. He goes onto say that Lachlan Mackintosh who was the son of the man who had murdered William's father, Lachlan Beg Mackintosh, 14th chief, had been sowing the seeds of discontent among the Clan Macpherson who were part of the Clan Chattan and that he was no well-wisher of William. Huntly, at the same time of withdrawing William's office from him gave lands to the conspiring Lachlan who then accused William of conspiring to take the life of Huntly. Huntly then seized chief William Mackintosh and put him on trial on 2 August 1550 at Aberdeen. Thomas Menzies, the Provost of Aberdeen defended William Mackintosh with some success. However, on 23 August 1550, William Mackintosh suffered death by the axe at Huntly Castle. It was said that Elizabeth Keith, Countess of Huntly gave the order.

There are other accounts, including that by William Forbes Skene, that state that William Mackintosh had burned Huntly's Auchindoun Castle which is why Huntly had him executed, but Alexander Mackintosh-Shaw states that this story is entirely fictitious. Huntly had made the traitor, Lachlan, Sheriff-depute of Inverness, jointly with Munro of Foulis. However, Lachlan the traitor was killed one year later in his house by some indignant clansmen. Parliament later held an inquiry into Huntly's actions and found that his execution of William Mackintosh was illegal and he had to compensate the Mackintosh family. In 1554, Huntly, along with the Earl of Argyll were ordered to exterminate the Clan Macdonald of Clanranald, but both failed in their objectives; Huntly, because the Highlanders were so much exasperated against him for having executed William Mackintosh in 1550, that he declined to face Clan Ranald with such an army, disbanding his forces.

== Family ==
William Mackintosh, 15th of Mackintosh married Margaret, daughter of Alexander Ogilvie, 1st Baron Findlater. Their children were:

1. Margaret Mackintosh, who was married successively to the lairds of Grant, Abergeldie, Pitsligo and William Sutherland, 9th of Duffus.
2. William Mackintosh, who died young.
3. Lachlan Mor Mackintosh, 16th of Mackintosh, heir and successor as chief of the Clan Mackintosh and Clan Chattan.

== See also ==
- Chiefs of Clan Mackintosh
