= Palm Sunday Massacre =

Palm Sunday Massacre may refer to:

- 1984 Palm Sunday massacre, a 1984 multiple homicide in Brooklyn, New York
- Battle of Palm Sunday or Massacre of Palm Sunday, a 1429 Scottish clan battle
- Palm Sunday Massacre, a 1943 World War II battle as part of Operation Flax
- Palm Sunday church bombings, twin church bombings in Egypt on April 9, 2017
- 2025 Sumy airstrike, in which 35 people were killed.
