= Battle of Clachnaharry =

Scottish clan battle that took place in the year 1454

Coordinates: 57°29′18″N 4°15′35″W

- Part of the Scottish clan wars
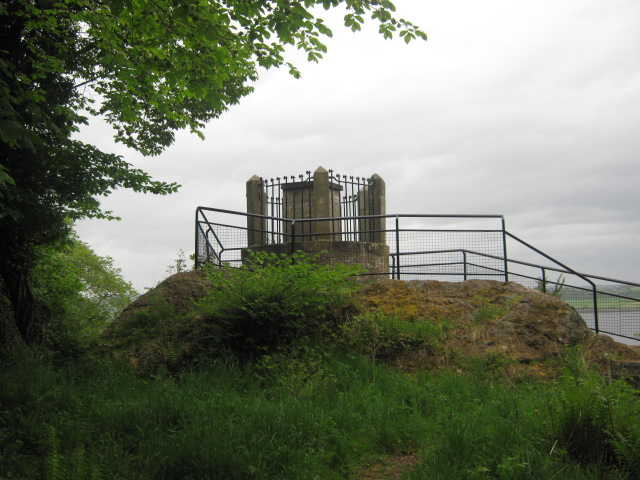
- The Clachnaharry battle monument
Date	1454 (some sources say earlier)
Location	Inverness, Scotland grid reference NH6454946448
Result	Munro victory

Belligerents
Clan Munro	Clan Mackintosh

Commanders and leaders
John Munro	Mackintosh of Mackintosh

Strength
Unknown	Unknown

Casualties and losses
Unknown	200 killed

The Battle of Clachnaharry was a Scottish clan battle that took place in the year 1454. It was fought between the Clan Munro and the Clan Mackintosh (Chattan Confederation) on the south bank of the Beauly Firth at Clachnaharry, on the outskirts of Inverness.

== Background ==
The Clan Munro were returning home after a cattle raid in Perthshire. On their return, an amount of "road collop" or passage money was demanded by the Clan Mackintosh, as was the custom in the Scottish Highlands. There was a dispute over the amount and a battle took place.

== Accounts of the battle ==
The earliest account was written by Sir Robert Gordon (1580–1656) in 1630. Gordon's account states that the Mackintosh chief was killed. The Mackintosh's own account, which was written later in 1679 states that the chief of Mackintoshes was not present and was not killed at Clachnaharry, and only that the chief's grandson was present. Most later accounts appear to have been based on Gordon's original account.

=== 17th-century manuscripts ===
==== Sir Robert Gordon (1630) ====
Sir Robert Gordon's account states that John Munro Tutor of Foulis was travelling home from the south of Scotland towards Ross. He fell at variance with some of the inhabitants of Strathdale between Saint Johnstone and Atholl who abused him. When Munro returned home he gathered all of his followers. He then singled out three hundred and fifty of the best and ablest men and went back to Strathardle to which he laid waste, spoiled, killed some of the people and carried away their cattle. On his return home he passed by the Isle of Moy and Mackintosh (chief of Clan Chattan) sent to him craving some of the spoils as was the custom. Gordon states that John Munro offered a reasonable portion, which Mackintosh through evil counsel refused to accept and would have no less than half of the whole booty. John Munro would not hearken or yield and continued on his journey home. Mackintosh then gathered all of his forces and followed John Munro whom he overtook at Clachnaharry, beside Inverness, hard by the ferry of Kessock. Gordon states that Munro perceiving Mackintosh sent fifty of his men home to Ferindonald with the spoil and encouraged the rest to fight. There ensued a cruel conflict where Mackintosh was killed along with most of his company. Divers of the Munros were also killed and John Munro was left for dead on the field. Munro was taken by Lord Lovat to his house where he was cured of his wounds and was from then on known as John Baclamhach because his hand was mutilated. From this John Munro the Munro of Milntown family are descended".

==== Wardlaw Manuscript (1674) ====
James Fraser wrote the Wardlaw manuscript in about 1674. Fraser states that in 1378 John Monroe was traveling home from Edinburgh and while resting in a meadow in Strathardle, the owners of the meadow cut off the tails of his horses. John Munro having returned home to Ross mustered the Monores and singled out 350 of the most resolute men. Monroe returned to Strathardle and carried away their strongest cattle such as horse, oxen and cows, and killed some of the men who resisted them. Monroe then returned home. However, while passing the Isle of Moy, Mackintosh, chief of Clan Chattan challenged Monroe for some of the cattle, as was the passing custom. The Wardlaw Manuscript implies that the Monroe Laird of Foulis was present and that he advised that a share of the booty should be given to Mackintosh. However, the cattle which Monroe of Milntown offered Mackintosh was not enough and Mackintosh would accept no less than half. Monroe continued on his journey and sent 50 of his men with the cattle into Fraser, Lord Lovat's country. Then Monroe with his 300 remaining men pitches on a litel levell near Clachniharry, taking advantage of the ground convenient for fighting. There ensued a most bloody battle between the Monroes and Mackintoshes, where in the first engagement the Laird of Mackintosh fell and his brother and second son were slain with him, with the prime part of his host and were defeated. Diverse of the Monroes were also killed but carried the day. It was computed that the Mackintoshes lost 200 men and the rest fled. John Monro was wounded and left among the dead but was found the next day by a woman and taken to Lovat where he was cared for. He was afterwards known as John Bach-klawach because one of his arms was mutilated. According to Fraser's Wardlaw Manuscript after the battle of Clachnaharry, John Munro who was wounded was cared for by the Frasers of Lovat, and that laid the foundation of kindness between the Frasers and Munros to this very day.

==== Mackintosh of Kinrara (1679) ====
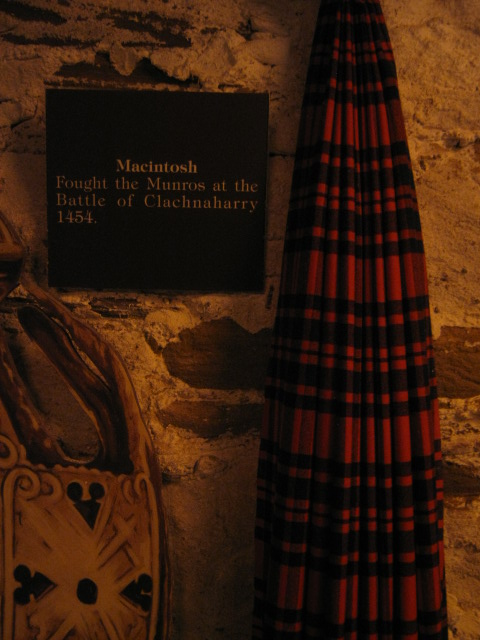
Clan Mackintosh tartan in the Clan Munro exhibition at the Storehouse of Foulis

Mackintosh of Kinrara states that in 1454 an unexpected contest sprung up between Malcolm Mackintosh, grandson of the chief of Mackintosh and John Munro, tutor of Foulis. Mackintosh states that a very keen contest followed in that John Munro was returning from a tour in the south and that a dissension took place between him and the inhabitants of Strathardle who loaded him with great abuse. Intent on revenge John Munro returned home and implored the assistance of his friends. At the head of two hundred chosen men he advanced with speed to Sthrathardle ravaged the country and carried off the herds of cattle. On his return at the River Findhorn he meets Malcolm Mackintosh by accident who demanded some of the plunder. John Munro offered Mackintosh twenty-four cows and a bull, which Mackintosh rejected, insisting on no less than one third. John Munro then proceeded on his way giving none. Mackintosh of Kinrara's account states that Malcolm Mackintosh then communicated to his friends and commanded the inhabitants of Petty and Lochardil to follow John and obstruct his passage until he, with his men of Strathnairn, shall have come up. They overtook John at Clachnaharry. John sent forty men off with the booty and encouraged the rest to fight in which a fierce conflict ensued. Mackintosh of Kinrara's account states that a few fell on each side. He goes on to say that John Munro was almost slain and left among the dead but Lord Lovat took care of his recovery. From John descended the family of Milntown. Mackintosh of Kinrara's account states that Malcolm Mackintosh was not present at the battle and that the same Malcolm Mackintosh later married Janet Munro, sister of John. (Note: The account given in Mackintosh of Kinrara's manuscript of 1679 is analysed in depth in the 1880 publication Historical Memoirs of the House and Clan of Mackintosh and of the Clan Chattan by Alexander Mackintosh Shaw, who also disputes the account given by John Anderson in his history of the Frasers (1825).)

=== 19th-century publications ===
==== John Anderson (1825) ====
John Anderson states that the Munros, a distinguished tribe in Ross were returning from the south of Scotland when they passed by Moyhall, the seat of MacKintosh, leader of the Clan Chattan. Mackintosh demanded a share of the booty or road callop payable to a chief for travelling through his land, which was acceded to but the Mackintoshes met the proposal with contempt. The Munros, pursuing their journey, forded the river Ness a little above the Islands, and dispatched the cattle they had plundered across the hill of Kinmylies, to Lovat's province. Their enemies met them at the point of Clachnaharry and they immediately joined in battle. Anderson states that after and obstinate struggle Mackintosh was killed and that John Munro was left for dead on the field, and from the loss of his arm he was known by the name of John Baclamhach. Anderson goes on to say that the Munros were not long in retaliating and having collected a sufficient force, they marched in the dead of night for the Isle of Moy where the chief of MacKintosh resided. By the aid of some planks which they had carried with them, and now put together, they crossed to the Isle, and glutted their thirst for revenge by murder or captivity of all the inmates.

==== William Anderson (1863) ====
William Anderson says that John Munro whilst returning from Edinburgh had the tails of his and his servants' horses cut off while sleeping in a meadow in Strathardle. In revenge John Munro returned home and selected 350 of his best men and returned to Strathardle which he spoiled, killed some of the inhabitants and carried off their cattle. On his return, while passing the castle of Moy the laird of Mackintosh sent a message to him demanding some of the spoil. Anderson goes on to say that this was customary among the Highlanders when a party drove cattle so taken through a gentleman's land, and the part so exacted was called a Staoig Rathaid or Staoig Creich that is, a road collop. Munro offered Mackintosh a reasonable share of the booty but Mackintosh would accept no less than half. This Munro refused and drove off the cattle. Shaw states that Mackintosh collected his clansmen and pursued Munro and came up with him at Clach-na-haire (Clachnaharry), near Inverness. Munro perceiving this approach sent fifty of his men home with the cattle and that in the ensuing contest, Mackintosh and the greater part of his men were killed. Several of the Munros were also killed and John Munro himself was left for dead on the field of battle. Lord Lovat had him carried to his house where he was cured of his wounds. One of his hands was so mutilated, that he lost the use of it, on which account he was afterwards culled John Bac-Laimh, or Ciotach. Anderson states that the Munros had the great advantage of the ground, by taking up a position among rocks, from which they annoyed the Mackintoslies with their arrows"...

==== Alexander Mackintosh-Shaw (1880) ====
According to Alexander Mackintosh-Shaw, writing in 1880, the account of the feud given by John Anderson in his history of the Frasers (1825) is far from being in harmony with the account given in the Mackintosh of Kinrara manuscript from 1679. Mackintosh-Shaw states that the Kinrara manuscript shows that it was not the chief of Clan Mackintosh who led the pursuit of the Munros but the chief's grandson who was also named Malcolm Mackintosh. This Malcolm was the son of the chief's youngest son Gillichallum who had been killed at the Battle of Craig Cailloc against the Clan Cameron in 1441. According to Mackintosh-Shaw the Kinrara manuscript suggests that the younger Malcolm's actions were taken without the chief's concurrence and that the chief was certainly not killed, nor present at the Battle of Clachnaharry. John Munro having offered Malcolm Mackintosh 24 cows and a bull, Mackintosh would accept no less than half and Munro continued on his journey having given non. Mackintosh sent his forces to attack John Munro, but according to the Kinrara manuscript Malcolm Mackintosh did not arrive until the battle was over and "went away sorrowful for what had come to pass through his hastiness". According to Mackintosh-Shaw the loss was equal on both sides. He goes on to state that the alleged retaliation by the Munros which included passage through Inverness which was a town always favourable to the Mackintoshes as well as through the most thickly populated part of Mackintosh country, is scarcely credible.

==== Lachlan Shaw (1882) ====
Lachlan Shaw states that in 1454 a shameful and bloody conflict happened between the Mackintoshes and the Munros. Shaw states that John Munro, tutor of Foulis was on his return from Edinburgh and that he rested in a meadow in Strathardle where the owner of the meadow cut off the tails of John's and his servant's horses. John Munro then returned with three hundred and fifty men, spoiled Strathardle and drove away their cattle. While passing Loch Moy Mackintosh sent to ask a Stike Raide-Staoig Raithid- or Stick Criech-Staoig Crech that is, a Road Callop; a custom among the Highlanders, that when a party drove away spoil through a gentleman's land they should give him part of the spoil. Munro then offered what he thought was reasonable but Mackintosh demanded more and pursued the Munros at Clachnaharry, near Inverness. Shaw states that they fought desperately and that many were killed on each side including the Laird of Mackintosh, and that John Munro was wounded and afterwards called John Bacilach. Shaw states that the Munros had the great advantage of ground by lurking among the rocks; whilst the MacKintoshes were exposed to their arrows.

== Clachnaharry Monument ==
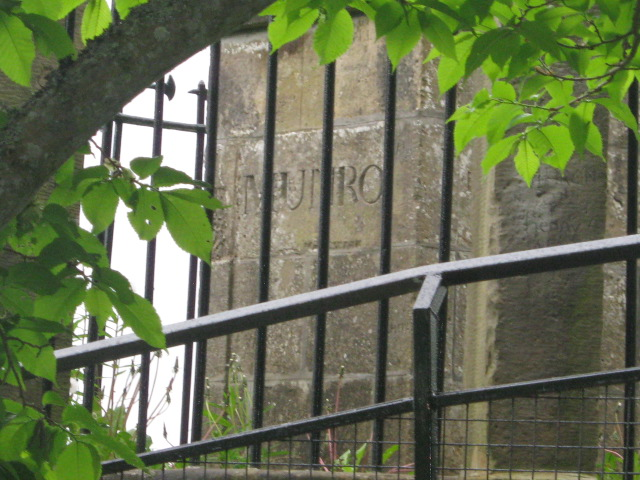
"Munro"

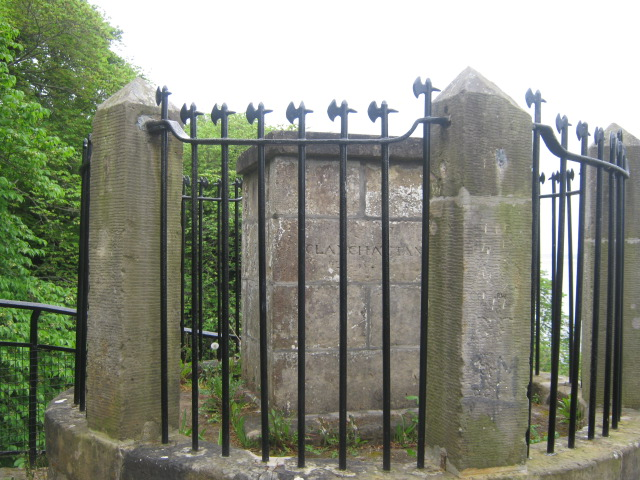
"Clan Chattan"

Clachnaharry battle monument, Clachnaharry, Inverness

The Clachnaharry Battle Monument marks the clash between the Munroes and the Mackintoshes (Clan Chattan). The monument was built by Major Hugh Robert Duff in 1821. The monument did once include a tall column about 40 ft to 50 ft high, but it fell over in gales in 1951. One side of the monument reads "Munro" and the other side reads "Chattan" facing the two clans respective territories.
