= Lachlan Beg Mackintosh, 14th of Mackintosh =

Scottish clan chief (died 1524)

Lachlan Beg Mackintosh, 14th of Mackintosh (died 1524) was the chief of the Clan Mackintosh, a Scottish clan of the Scottish Highlands. He was also chief of the confederation of clans that was known as the Clan Chattan.

== Early life ==
Lachlan Beg Mackintosh, 14th of Mackintosh, was the second son of Lachlan Mackintosh (usually surnamed "Badenoch") who in turn was the second son of Malcolm Beg Mackintosh, 10th of Mackintosh. Lachlan had succeeded his elder brother, William Mackintosh, 13th chief, because when William died, although he had two natural sons, they were both illegitimate.

== Chief of Clan Mackintosh and Clan Chattan ==
In 1517, Lachlan sent one hundred men of his clan to support John and Donald Mackay who were the sons of Iye Roy Mackay, 10th of Strathnaver in a dispute to secure the chiefship of the Clan Mackay, in which the brothers John and Donald were successful.

In 1520, Lachlan married Jean Gordon, daughter of Sir Alexander Gordon of Lochinver. According to the Mackintosh's own 17th century Kinrara manuscript the marriage had been brought about by the Earl of Moray for the purpose of bringing Mackintosh into his own faction and strengthening his own power in the north.

According to the 19th-century historian Alexander Mackintosh Shaw, Lachlan was peace loving but this was not in harmony with some of his clansmen. One of whom was his first cousin, Dougal Mor Mac Gillichallum. Upon the release of the 12th chief of Clan Mackintosh from prison in 1513, Dougal had recovered for the clan the lands of Petty after raiding and chasing the Ogilvies away. He had also taken Inverness Castle which he had occupied for some time, but which chief Lachlan Beg Mackintosh disapproved of as it brought Dougal into mutiny with the royal authority. Dougal and his sons Ferquhard and Donald were later killed by the Earl of Moray when he re-took Inverness Castle.

The Clan Fraser of Lovat had long been dominant in the area that is known as The Aird, so much so that possessions in it by other families were almost unknown or forgotten about. However, Lachlan Mackintosh, 14th chief had by 1520 acquired a considerable estate in The Aird.

== Death ==
Another Mackintosh clansmen was John Malcolmson who was the natural son of chief Lachlan's deceased elder half-brother. Lachlan appears to have been extremely kind towards him; in 1522 he gave to him the occupation of Connage in Petty and marriage to Effie Dunbar, relic of Andrew Munro of Milntown. However, on 25 March 1524, John Malcolmson, along with two Davidsons and some accomplices treacherously murdered chief Lachlan Beg Mackintosh when he was hunting at Ravoch, Badenoch. The murderers took refuge in the fort at Loch-an-Eilan (Rothiemurchus). However, there they were captured three months later by Donald Glas, natural son of Lachlan's predecessor, along with Donald MacWilliam the grandson of Alan and aided by the chief of Clan Gregor who had married a sister of the deceased Lachlan. The murderers, John Malcolmson and his two principal assistants, were tried and found guilty by the Earl of Moray. Malcolmson was beheaded and quartered and the two Davidsons were tortured and then hanged. However, other accounts of this episode make no mention of their trial by the Earl of Moray and only that they were cut to pieces upon being captured.

== Family ==
Lachlan had one son with his wife Jean Gordon, William Mackintosh, 15th of Mackintosh, who upon his father's death was just three years old. William was executed in 1550 at Aberdeen by the Earl of Huntly upon the instigation of another Lachlan who was the son of John Malcolmson who had murdered William's father, Lachlan, the 14th chief. Lachalan Beg Mackintosh, 14th chief also had three natural daughters and two natural sons, John, who was ancestor of the Mackintoshes in Dunachton and William who was the ancestor of the Mackintoshes of Kinrara and Pittourie.

== See also ==
- Chiefs of Clan Mackintosh
