= Battle of Drumlui =

Scottish clan battle

Coordinates: 56°55′14″N 5°10′47″W

- Part of Clan Cameron-Clan Mackintosh feud
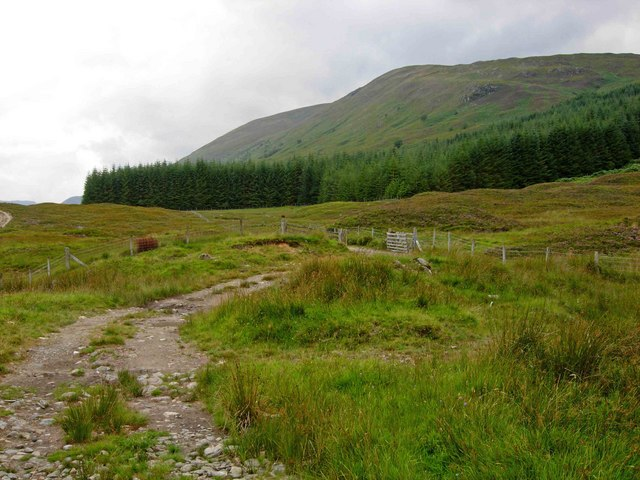
- Druim Gleann Laoigh, probable site of the battle
Date	1330 or 1337
Location	Lochaber area, probably Druim Gleann Laoigh grid reference NN0685 ??
Result	Mackintosh victory

Belligerents
Clan Mackintosh	Clan Cameron

Commanders and leaders
William MacKintosh	Donald Alin Mhic Evin

Strength
Unknown	Unknown

Casualties and losses
Unknown	Unknown

The Battle of Drumlui was a Scottish clan battle that took place in either 1330 or 1337, in the Scottish Highlands between the Clan Cameron and the Clan Mackintosh.

== Background ==
The parents of William Mackintosh, 7th chief of Clan Mackintosh and the confederation of Clan Chattan, had migrated from their lands in Lochaber which were subsequently occupied by the Clan Cameron without disturbance. However, when William became a man he demanded that the lands be restored to him, but this claim was denied to him and refused by the Camerons who claimed that the lands had been deserted and now belonged to themselves as they were the first to seize and occupy them.

== Battle ==
The (Mackintosh of) Kinrara MS (manuscript) (Note: The Mackintosh of Kinrara manuscript is a history of the Clan Mackintosh that was written in the 17th century and chronicles the history of the Mackintoshes up to the year 1680. It has been published as A Chronicle of the Family of Mackintosh to 1680.) mentions a great battle at Drumlui in which William Mackintosh defeated the Camerons who were under the leadership of Donald Alin Vic Ian, or Donald Alin Mhic Evin. However, a number of Mackintosh and Clan Shaw men were also mortally wounded.

== Aftermath ==
This battle led to a long-lasting 350 year feud which did not end until near the end of the 17th century. In the immediate aftermath of the Battle of Drumlui each clan alternately harried each other's lands, lifting cattle, until the famous Battle of Invernahavon in 1370.
