= Battle of Bun Garbhain =

1570 battle in Scotland

Coordinates: 56.846°N 5.318°W

- Part of Cameron-Mackintosh feud
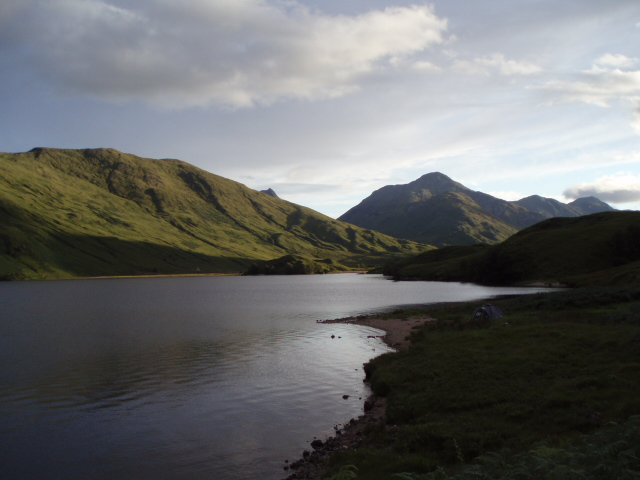
- Loch Arkaig
Date	1570
Location	Bun Garbhain by Loch Eil
Result	Cameron victory

Belligerents
Clan Cameron	Chattan Confederation

The Battle of Bun Garbhain was a Scottish clan battle fought in 1570, in the Scottish Highlands, between the Clan Cameron and the Clan Mackintosh.

== Division and invasion ==
Donald Dubh Cameron, XV Chief of Clan Cameron, died, leaving an infant son, Allan, at the head of the clan. As the young boy could not lead, this brought about internal disagreements between two main branches of the family, the Lochiel and the Erracht. Cameron of Erracht claimed chiefship himself. To add to the confusion the little boys mother was from Clan Mackintosh, a clan with a long history of enmity towards Clan Cameron.

In this pretext, the chief of Clan MacKintosh, led 200 men, into the Cameron lands near Loch Arkaig whereupon a bloody battle ensued.

== Battles ==
Though outnumbered, the Camerons had the high ground and soon there were many dead and injured from the MacKintoshes. MacKintosh led his men in retreat around the head of Loch Eil to the Ardgour shore and rallied his men.

The Camerons were in swift pursuit and a second engagement took place, with similar results as the first. In the midst of this action, the chief of MacKintosh is believed to have been killed by Donald 'Taillear Dubh na Tuaighe' Cameron (son of the XIV Chief of Clan Cameron), with a fearsome Lochaber axe. MacKintosh's followers took their stricken chief and fell back to Bun Garbhain (Bun Garvan).

Both sides met once again for an indeterminate time, before disengaging for the night. The MacKintoshes made camp in a small hollow called Cuil nan Cuileag, and thought that they were safe. However, the Camerons stormed the encampment and killed every MacKintosh.

== Aftermath ==
The mother of Allan Cameron, the infant chief of Clan Cameron, was in fact a MacKintosh. After the battle, Taillear Dubh came to give her an account of the fighting. He apparently said “Gun robh bian cait au diugh air plang, agus rogha’s taghadh air peighinn” which translates to "A cat’s skin might be had this day for a plack (coin)" in obvious reference to the killing of the Mackintosh whose symbol was the highland cat. Enraged with the news of all her dead kin, she tried to kill her son, but Taillear Dubh intervened in time. Allan Cameron was safe, but his mother was banished from Lochaber forever.
