= Jean Cameron of Glendessary =

Scottish Jacobite (c. 1698–1772)

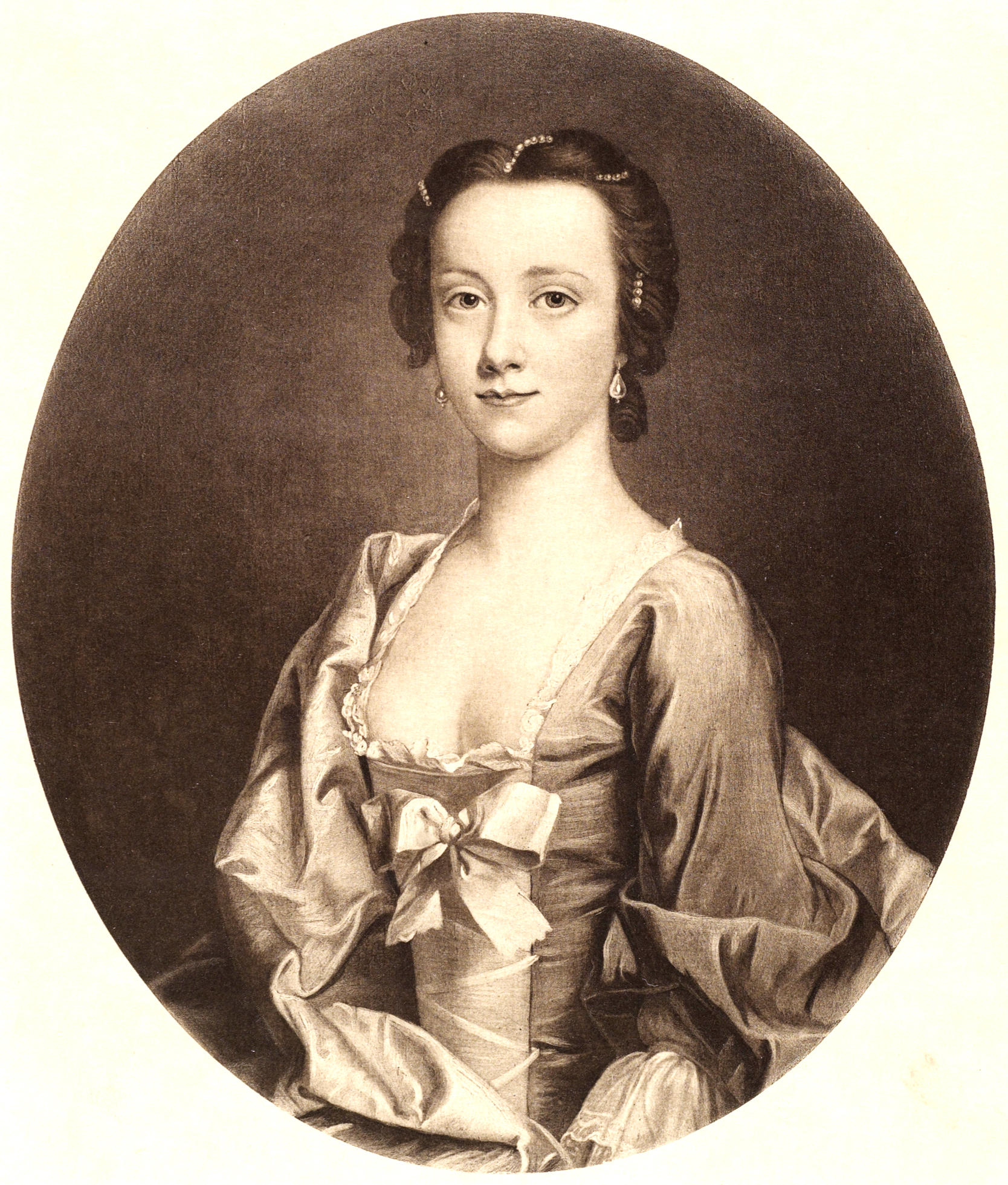
- Portrait, traditionally identified as Jean Cameron, by Allan Ramsay
- Born: c.1698
- Died: 27 June 1772
- Burial place: Blacklaw, East Kilbride
- Other names: Jenny Cameron
- Known for: Claimed to be the mistress of Charles Edward Stuart
- Parent(s): Allan Cameron, 3rd of Glendessary; Lady Christian Cameron
- Relatives: Donald Cameron of Lochiel (cousin), Fr. Alexander Cameron, (cousin and foster brother)

Jean Cameron of Glendessary (c. 1698 – 1772) was a member of the Scottish gentry and a Jacobite, said to have been involved in the Jacobite rising of 1745, during which Charles Edward Stuart attempted to reclaim the British throne for his father. Popularly known as Jenny Cameron, or Bonnie Jeanie Cameron, she became a Jacobite heroine after a number of sensationalised accounts of her life and deeds during the rising were published. (Note: The majority were almost entirely fictional and some were intended as anti-Stuart propaganda, particularly those that depicted her as a military leader.)

== Background ==
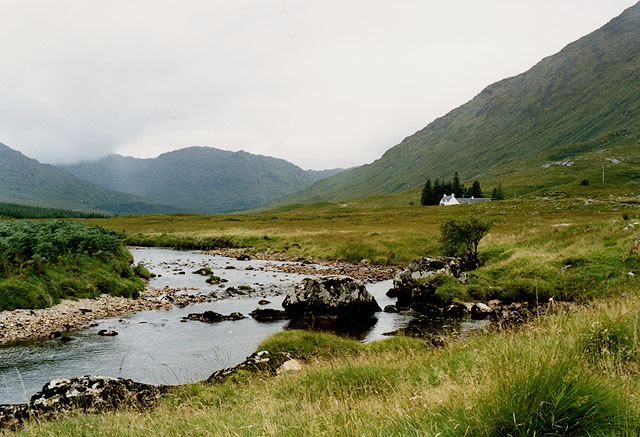
The river below Glendessary House, Lochaber

Jean Cameron was the daughter of Allan Cameron (d. c. 1721) of Glendessary, who had previously been involved in the 1715 Jacobite rising. The Camerons of Glendessary, who held land in Morvern, were a cadet branch of the family of Cameron of Lochiel, hereditary Chiefs of Clan Cameron, descended from Allan Cameron of Lochiel, 16th Chief.

Jean was further connected with the Camerons of Lochiel through her mother Christian Cameron, a daughter of Sir Ewen Cameron of Lochiel, 17th Chief by his third wife. She had two brothers: John (c.1715-1758) the senior brother and heir, and Allan. Few details of her life can be established; she is said to have married an Irish army officer called O'Neill, but was widowed and returned to Scotland.

Her brother John had suffered from a form of disability (described as a "palsy") since childhood and Jean often acted as his agent. Jean's brothers went abroad in 1744, appointing her factor of the family estates. As tacksmen, holding a lease from the clan chief, the family had an obligation to raise their sub-tenants for military service at the chief's request: when in August 1745, Donald Cameron of Lochiel committed to supporting Charles Stuart, the Camerons of Glendessary were required to follow.

== 1745 Rising ==
Jean Cameron was reported to have been present at Glenfinnan on 19 August when Charles raised his standard; in line with her duties as proxy tacksman, she may have accompanied some of the Cameron levies from Morvern along with her cousin, Alexander Cameron of Dungallon. She subsequently attended the Jacobite court in Edinburgh, but took little further part in the rebellion. Aeneas MacDonald, who had been present at Glenfinnan, described her as a "widow, nearer fifty than forty [...] a genteel, well-looked handsome woman, with a pair of pretty eyes, and hair as black as jet. She is of a very sprightly genius and is very agreeable in conversation. She was so far from accompanying the Prince's army, that she went off with the rest of the spectators as soon as the army marched".

=== Relationship with Prince Charles Stuart and government propaganda ===
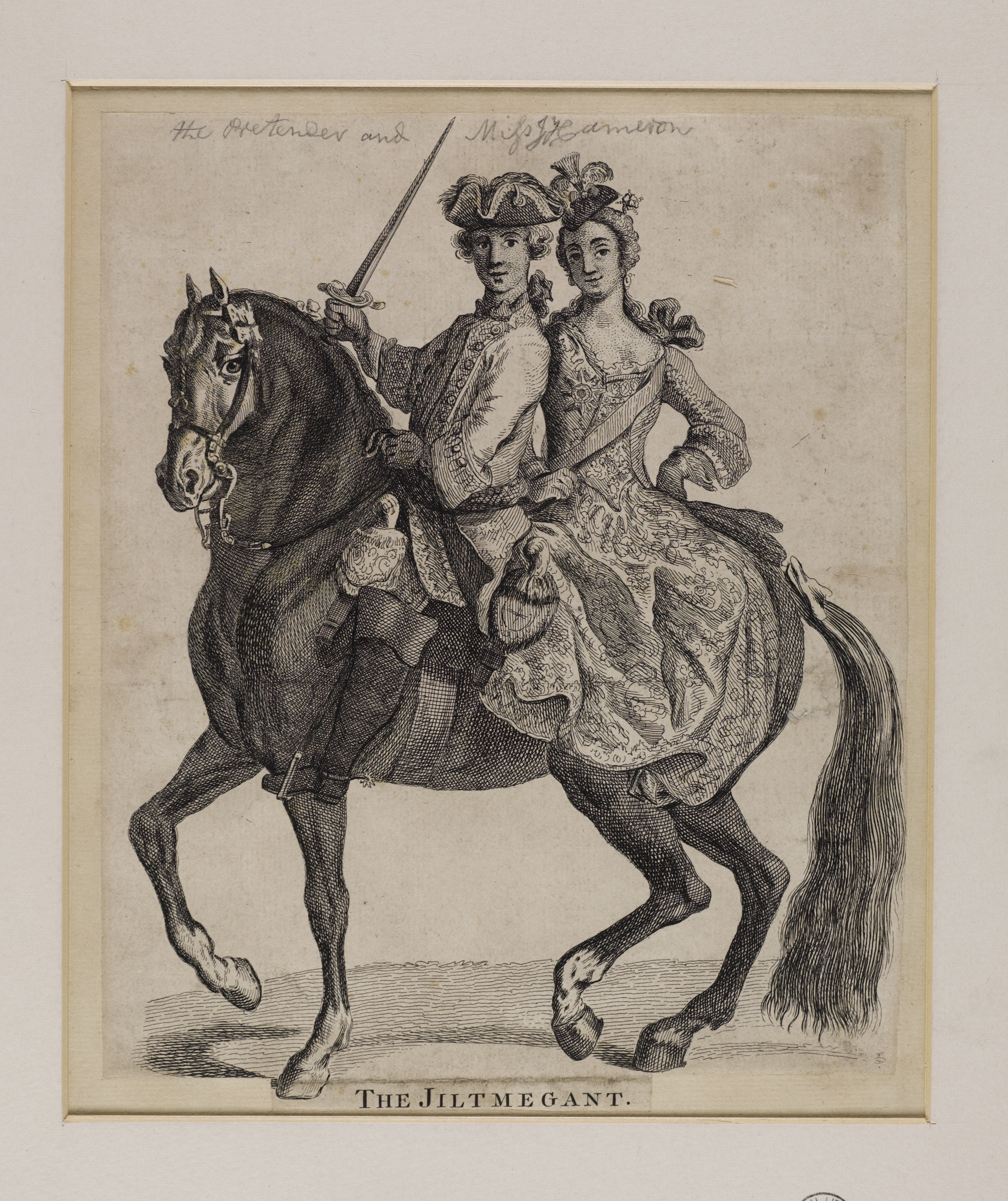
Anti-Jacobite broadside depicting Jenny Cameron and Bonnie Prince Charlie on horseback

Despite Cameron probably having limited involvement in the course of the rising, a number of "cruel and apocryphal" accounts were circulated in England, some of which portrayed Cameron as an active military leader, an "amazon" marching at the head of her men. A 'memoir' written by Alexander Arbuthnot, described her as having a voracious sexual appetite and claimed she had borne several illegitimate children. Indeed, she was frequently described by contemporaries as a "lewd woman" who became Prince Charles's mistress, with some accounts claiming she "spent the night with the prince after the ceremony (at Glenfinnan)" and was his mistress "all the way to Derby and back to Culloden".

These accounts are probably fictitious and constitute Hanoverian propaganda. Such stories were intended to delegitimise the Jacobite cause by identifying it as the party of chaos and by suggesting its male leaders were cowards, morally bankrupt or otherwise inadequate. Their popularity was to give rise to songs, novels and even a play, and by 1750 "Jenny Cameron" was a legend, although at the cost of Jean Cameron's good reputation.

The truth about Cameron's involvement in the rising was further confused when a woman called Jean or Jenny Cameron was taken prisoner by the government army in 1746 at Stirling; although confused with Jean Cameron of Glendessary, including by the government itself, she claimed to in fact be a milliner from Edinburgh.

== After the rising ==
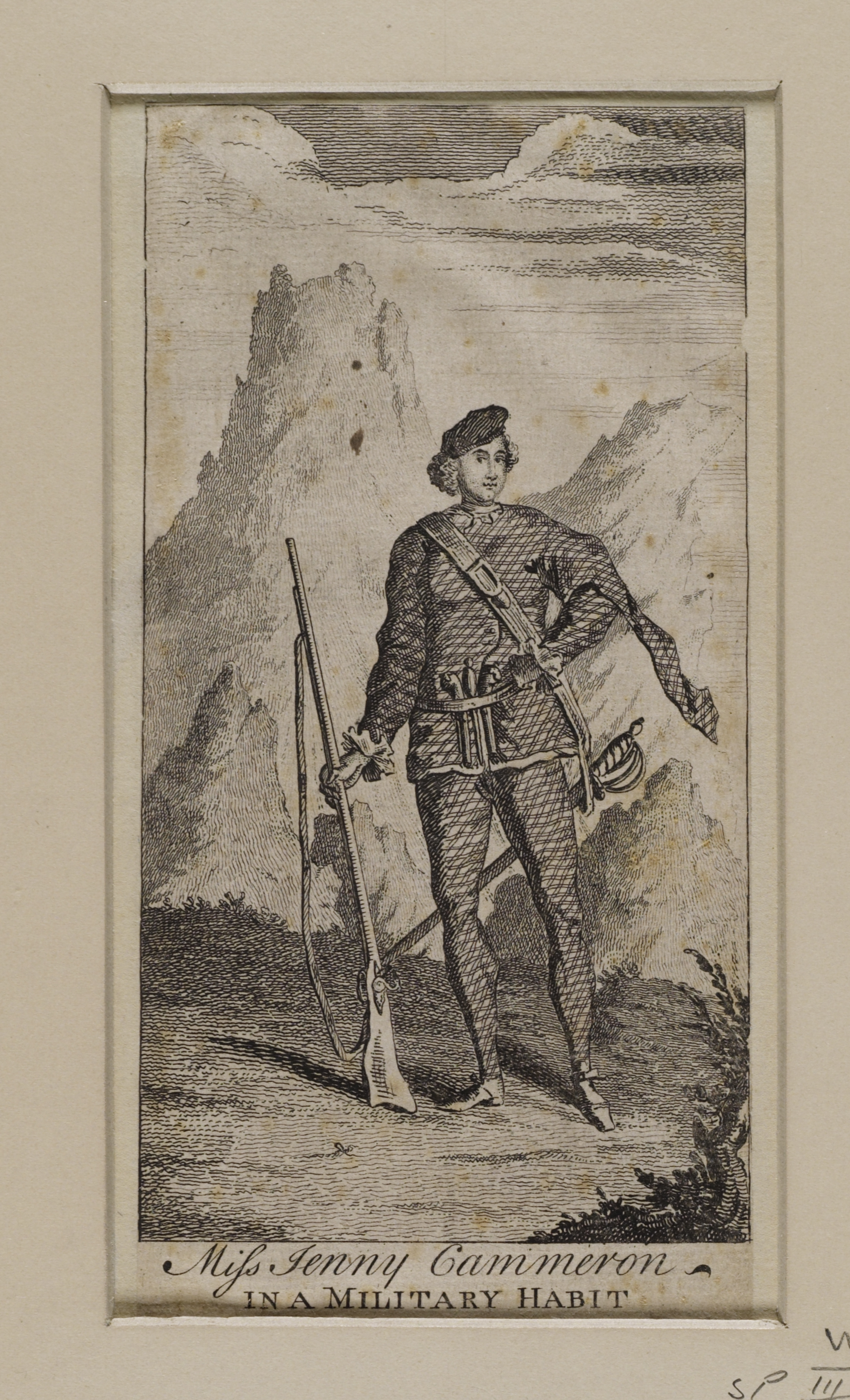
Anti-Jacobite satirical print from a memoir of Lochiel's brother Archibald, showing "Miss Jenny Cammeron" dressed in male Highland clothing.

After the failure of the rising in 1746, the Cameron tenants in Morvern suffered from punitive actions by government militias, although the Glendessary family seem to have retained most of their property. Cameron herself returned to relative obscurity.

In 1751, she purchased the isolated estates of Rodinghead and Blacklaw in Lanarkshire, near modern-day St Leonards, East Kilbride. She is said to have lived a quiet and devout existence at Blacklaw and to have been locally popular; though a Catholic herself she financially supported the local Presbyterian school. A late 18th-century account by a local antiquary remembered her as "retaining [...] the striking remains of a graceful beauty" and as "rather melancholy", though an informed and intelligent conversationalist, noting that "politics was her favourite topic". In the 1830s John Lindsay, an elderly resident of the parish, recalled that "very many poor Highlanders were in the habit of visiting her".

Cameron died in 1772 and was buried on the Blacklaw estate near her house, 'Mount Cameron'; the East Kilbride poet John Struthers later wrote of the "dark firs" surrounding the "lowly" grave. By 1793 the grave was said to be "distinguished by nothing but a turf of grass, which is now almost equal with the ground". During the 20th century the site of the estate became a golf course, and the house itself was demolished in 1958; however a horse chestnut tree was planted near the grave and a plaque set up in the same year.

== Ancestors ==
The Cameron of Lochiel chiefs are descended from Katherine Cameron, Jean's niece through her brother Allan. The XXIII Chief Donald Cameron, 23rd Lochiel married Lady Vere Hobart, Jean’s great-great-grand-niece. Lady Vere's mother, Janet MacLean, was the great-granddaughter of Allan Cameron, 5th of Glendessary and Sibilla MacLean.
