= Battle of Craig Cailloch =

Scottish clan battle in 1441 between Clans Cameron and Mackintosh

Coordinates: 56.987°N 3.878°W

- Part of Clan Cameron-Clan Mackintosh feud
- Crest badges of Clan Cameron (first) and Clan Mackintosh (second)
Date	1441
Location	Craig Cailloch, Scottish Highlands
Result	Cameron victory

Belligerents
Clan Cameron	Chattan Confederation

Commanders and leaders
	Lachlan Badenoch Mackintosh (WIA); Gillichallum Mackintosh †; Angus Mackintosh †

The Battle of Craig Cailloch was a Scottish clan battle fought in 1441 between the Clan Cameron and Clan Mackintosh (who were part of the Chattan Confederation). The two clans had defected from Alexander of Islay, Earl of Ross during his war with James I of Scotland. Alexander lost the war but was subsequently appointed Justiciar of Scotia by James and became reconciled to the Chattans. Alexander encouraged the Chattans to invade the lands of the Camerons which resulted in a battle on Craig Cailloch in 1441. The battle was bloody and several leading Chattan men were killed. Afterwards Malcolm Mackintosh led further raids into Cameron territory to avenge the deaths. Donald Dubh, leader of the Camerons was later forced into exile in Ireland.

== Background ==
The conflict took place in the aftermath of the war between James I of Scotland and Alexander of Islay, Earl of Ross, the Lord of the Isles, which culminated in Alexander's defeat at the Battle of Lochaber in 1429 and his subsequent imprisonment. Both Clan Cameron and Clan Chattan (an alliance of clans in which Clan Mackintosh played a leading role) had deserted the Lord of the Isles and sided with King James, however following his release and elevation to Justiciar of Scotia in 1439, Alexander became reconciled with the Chattans while regarding the Camerons as traitors. This is possibly because of the late timing of the Camerons' defection, or perhaps Alexander was hoping that by siding with one clan, he could have revenge on both by allowing them to slaughter each other. Thus the Chattans were encouraged in 1441 to invade the Camerons' lands and lay waste to them in one of Alexander's first actions as Justiciar.

== The battle ==
The site of the battle between the Chattans and Camerons is not known for certain. Most accounts give the location as Craig Cailloch, a term derived from the Scottish Gaelic chreag meaning 'rock' and cailleach meaning 'old woman'. John Drummond gives the place name as "Craigiarlich, in the Brae of Badenoch". The Camerons were led by Ewan, the capable son of Donald McEwan. The encounter was a bloody one; Lachlan Badenoch, the second son of Malcolm Mackintosh, chief of Clan Chattan, was wounded, one account says that he "lost several fingers", although he was not, as Locheil states, killed. Lachlan's younger brother, Gillichallum, and his cousin Angus were amongst the dead.

== Aftermath ==
Malcolm Mackintosh's eldest son, Duncan, avenged the death of Gillichallum and his cousin by launching widespread raids on the Cameron lands in Lochaber. Ewan McEwan's brother, Donald Dubh, who inherited the Cameron chieftainship soon after the battle, was eventually forced into exile in Ireland, forfeiting his lands at Locheil. The continuing enmity with the Earl of Ross was said to have caused this.
