= Battle of Invernahavon =

14th-century Scottish clan battle

Coordinates: 57°2′20″N 4°9′36″W

- Part of Clan Cameron-Clan Mackintosh feud
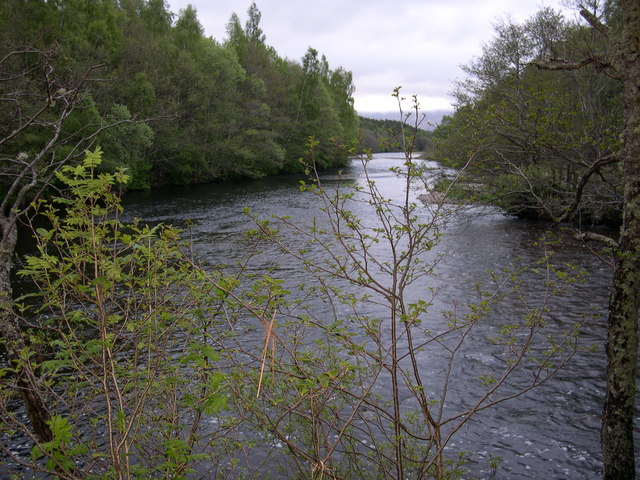
- The River Spey at the point where it is joined by the River Truim (on the right), where the battle is said to have taken place
Date	1386, 1370
Location	Invernahavon in the upper Spey valley grid reference NN689962
Result	Chattan (Mackintosh) victory

Belligerents
Clan Cameron	Chattan Confederation

Commanders and leaders
Charles MacGilony	Lachlan Mackintosh

Strength
400	Somewhat more than 400

Casualties and losses
High	Unknown

The Battle of Invernahavon was a Scottish clan battle between the Clan Cameron and the confederation of Clan Chattan that consisted of the Clan Mackintosh, Clan Macpherson, and Clan Davidson amongst others. Some sources give the date as 1386, others as 1370.

== Background ==
During the chiefship of Lachlan Mackintosh, 8th chief of Clan Mackintosh, a feud had raged for some years with the Clan Cameron, apparently over the disputed lands of Glenlui and Loch Arkaig. Each side had raided each other's lands, lifting property.

== Battle ==
In 1370, it is recorded in the Mackintosh MSS (manuscript), that around 400 Camerons made a raid into Badenoch and when they were returning home with their captured booty they were overtaken at Invernahavon by the Clan Chattan who were led in person by the Mackintosh chief.

In the first engagement, Mackintosh was defeated by the Camerons despite having a numerically superior force. This was apparently because there had been a dispute among the Clan Chattan between the Macphersons and Davidsons over who should have command of the right wing of their force, which was the post of honour. The Mackintosh chief favoured the Davidsons and as a result the Macphersons withdrew in disgust. Thus with the loss of the Macphersons, Mackintosh's force together with the Davidsons was numerically inferior and was totally defeated by the Camerons.

However, soon after the Macphersons rejoined the battle and attacked the Camerons turning their victory into a defeat. The Camerons then retreated towards the Pass of Drumochter, skirting the end of Loch Ericht then turning westwards towards the River Treig. In the author's introduction to the Lochiel Memoirs published in 1842, it is stated that the Mackintosh chief had sent a man to taunt the Macphersons as cowards for not fighting the Camerons which subsequently coerced them back into the battle. According to Lachlan Shaw, the leader of the Camerons was one Charles Macgilony who was killed in the battle. However, Alexander Mackintosh-Shaw states that this is contrary to the tradition of the locality that the chief of the Camerons, Dhomhnuil Duibhe, commanded in person.

== Aftermath ==
According to Lachlan Shaw the Battle of Invernahavon gave occasion to the Battle of the North Inch in Perth in 1396 that was also fought between the Clan Chattan and Clan Cameron. Alexander Mackintosh-Shaw also stated that it is highly likely that the combat at Perth had some connection with that at Invernahavon.
