= Battle of Lochaber =

1429 Scottish clan battle

Coordinates: 57°N 5°W

- Part of the Scottish clan wars
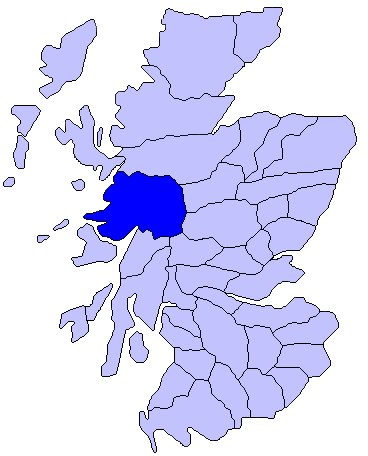
- Historic district of Lochaber
Date	23? June 1429
Location	Lochaber area of western Scotland grid reference NM97
Result	Royalist victory

Belligerents
Kingdom of Scotland	Lordship of the Isles: Clan Donald; Clan Cameron; Clan Mackintosh

Commanders and leaders
King James I	Alexander MacDonald; Donald Cameron

Strength
Unknown	Unknown

Casualties and losses
Unknown	Unknown

The Battle of Lochaber was fought in 1429, in the Scottish Highlands, between the forces of Alexander of Islay, Earl of Ross, Lord of the Isles and chief of Clan Donald against the Royalist army of King James I of Scotland.

It is known as the Battle of Split Allegiances among the Camerons. This is explained either by the fact that they deserted Alexander when faced with the prospect of supporting him as their feudal lord against their king, or that different factions in the clan lined up on both sides.

== Background ==
Lochaber was part of Princess Margaret's dowry when she married John Macdonald (John of Islay), Lord of the Isles, in the mid 14th century. In turn their eldest son, Donald Macdonald, Lord of the Isles, gave the lordship of Lochaber to his younger brother, Alexander. Robert Stewart, Duke of Albany, enemy of the Macdonalds, took effective control of the north of Scotland towards the end of the reign of his father Robert II, in the absence of the young King James I, who was a prisoner of England's kings (first Richard II, then King Henry IV and then King Henry V).

Albany's power increased during the reign (1390–1406) of his ineffective elder brother Robert III. He then became regent whilst James I was held captive in England. After Albany's death in 1420, the Scots paid a ransom to release James. James returned in 1424 determined to bring his kingdom to heel; one of his first acts was to execute most of Albany's heirs and restore the Earldom of Ross to the Macdonalds. Albany's grandson James Mór rebelled, attacking Dumbarton and killing the King's uncle John Stewart of Dundonald, but was driven into exile in Ireland and died in 1429.

Throughout the 15th century the Lords of the Isles attempted to secure their lands on the mainland of Scotland. In particular, Donald of Islay, Lord of the Isles claimed the Earldom of Ross through his marriage to Mariota (Margaret), Countess of Ross. He had claimed this territory while Albany was ruling as Regent and then successfully pursued his claim by right of the sword in 1411 at the Battle of Harlaw near Inverurie. Margaret's niece Euphemia inherited the title in 1402 but in 1415 was persuaded by Albany to take the veil and resign her rights in favor of Albany's son John Stewart, Earl of Buchan but he was not the proper heir and that did not last.

Mariota ignored the transfer and claimed that she had inherited the title on Euphemia's death in 1424, whilst Buchan's death the same year gave his first cousin King James a "highly dubious claim" to the title. However, in 1424 James confirmed Mariota as Countess of Ross. In 1437, King James was murdered. After the king’s death, Alexander was recognized as the Earl of Ross, possibly as a result of action by the Regents appointed for the young King James II (then age 6). The lands of Buchan, too, fell to Alexander at this time. In 1440, Alexander's mother Mariota died and her son Alexander, Lord of the Isles officially inherited the title.

In August of 1428, following King James' general council at Perth, he traveled to Inverness with a large royal entourage, calling for a "parliament" at Inverness Castle at which Alexander, Mariota and 'nearly all the notable men of the north' were promptly arrested as they arrived. One theory is that James wanted to replace Alexander with his uncle John Mór as Lord of the Isles, or to use that as a ruse to divide the Lordship, but he was forced to release Alexander either as a result of John's murder or as a precondition set by John before he would negotiate. Some sources say Alexander was imprisoned for a few weeks, others say a few months; still others say for a year. Three other chiefs were executed. In the end the earldom remained with Alexander Macdonald and Clan Donald.

== Campaign ==
This leads to the suggestion that John Mor's son Donald Balloch wanted revenge for his father's murder by the king. Alexander, too, would have wanted revenge for the king's treachery and the killing of his kin at Inverness. His great-nephew's Raid on Ross in 1491 provides a possible template – capture the garrison at Inverness, then head north to ravage the lands of royalist sympathizers in Ross.

In the spring of 1429, Alexander led an army of "upwards of 10,000 men". The events at the Inverness "parliament" appear to have forged an unusual coalition between clans such as the Camerons and the Chattan Confederation (Clan Mackintosh), who had been feuding for over a century. But when the royal standard was unfurled at Lochaber, Clan Chattan and Clan Cameron (or part of it) defected to the royal side, causing Alexander's army to be put to flight. Alexander returned to the Isles.

== Battle ==
The Royalists appear to have caught the clansmen by surprise on a moor or "marshy ground" somewhere in Lochaber, the district around Fort William at the western end of the Great Glen. The exact location is not known, and there is also some uncertainty about the date of the battle. Traditionally it was on 23 June 1429, the "vigil" (i.e. day before) of the feast day of the Nativity of St. John the Baptist but some modern sources say 26 June.

Faced by the Royalist forces, the Camerons under Donald Dubh defected from their feudal overlord to the Crown. Another theory is that the MacMartin Camerons went over to the King but not the Camerons of Lochiel, hence the Camerons know this battle as the "Battle of Split Allegiances". The Mackintoshes also switched sides. History does not record whether these changes of mind required inducements from James. However, soon afterwards the king gave the Mackintoshes lands in Lochaber belonging to Alexander's uncle, Alexander of Lochalsh.

After this loss of manpower, Alexander escaped to the Isles but the king remained in the area, taking Dingwall Castle and Urquhart Castle, Macdonald strongholds.

== Aftermath ==
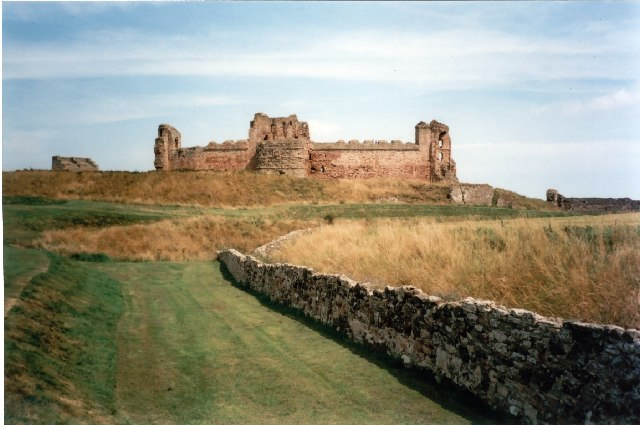
Tantallon Castle, home to Alexander's second captivity.

Alexander escaped to the islands and his first attempt to sue for peace was refused. So he went secretly to Edinburgh and dressed only in his shirt and drawers, he handed over his sword to James in the royal church of Holyrood Abbey on 28 August (or in early 1430). The Queen was impressed by his humility and pleaded for his life so Alexander was imprisoned again, this time in Tantallon Castle.

He was released in November 1431, after the collapse of Donald Balloch's rebellion in that year. After the death of the Earl of Mar in 1435, James accepted Alexander's position as Earl of Ross and allowed him control of Inverness.

One theory holds that the battle of Lochaber was a defining moment in the early history of the Clan Cameron, at that time it was more a confederation than a homogenous clan and the MacMartins' defection reflected this. In this view of history, the MacMartins were punished for their treachery by the Camerons of Lochiel, such that the MacMartin chiefs were driven into exile and the Lochiel faction took control of the clan. Donald Dubh appears to have supported James in his defeat at the Battle of Inverlochy in 1431 and the Cameron lands were ravaged afterwards. When Alexander was released, he took further vengeance on the clan he viewed as traitors, driving Donald Dubh into exile and giving the Cameron lands in Lochiel to John Garve Maclean of Coll.
