= Donald Dubh Cameron =

Scottish Highlands clan chief (fl. 1411)

Donald Dubh Cameron (fl. 1411) was the first authentic chief of Clan Cameron. Traditionally, it is held that the Camerons are of ancient Celtic origin and descend Banquo, Thane of Lochaber (fl. 11th century), while other legends include descent from a Danish prince.

According to Clan genealogy, Donald Dubh was the son of Allan MacOchtery Cameron, 9th Chief and succeeded his brother Ewen, 10th Chief. His immediate ancestor, Sir John de Cameron was known to have supported Robert the Bruce during the Scottish Wars of Independence. He himself fought at the Battle of Harlaw in 1411, and began the infamous feud with the Clan Mackintosh. In 1426, he had a charter from King James I of the lands of Barches acquired through his grandfather's marriage with Elaine Mowat.

He was said to have been a great warrior, the most dominant warlord in Lochaber. All subsequent Cameron chiefs bear the Gaelic patronymic Mac Dhòmhnaill Dubh.

== See also ==
- Chiefs of Clan Cameron
