= Rait Castle =

Ruined hall-house castle in Highland, Scotland

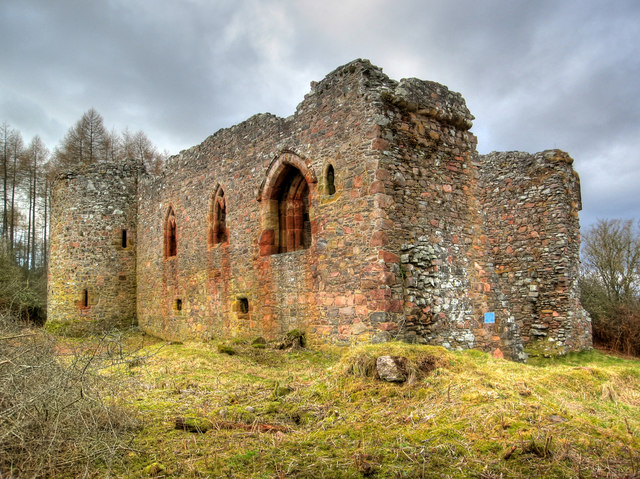
- Ruins of Rait Castle

Site information
- Owner: Earl Cawdor

Location
- Location within Highland
- Coordinates: 57.5494°N 3.8499°W

Site history
- Built: 13th century
- Materials: Granite

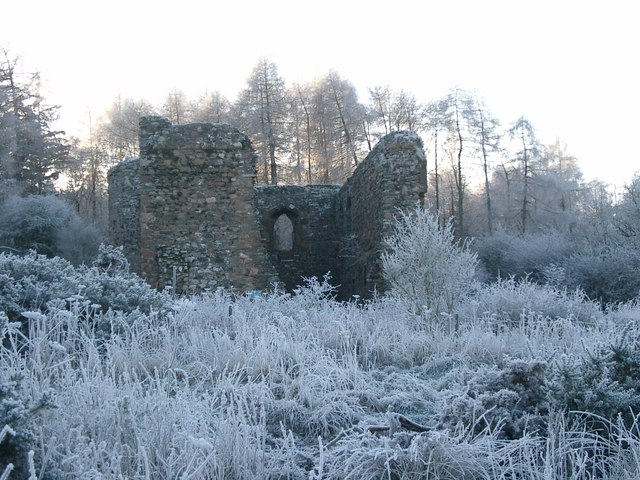
Ruins of Rait Castle in winter

Rait Castle is a ruined hall-house castle dating from the late thirteenth or early fourteenth century, situated just south of Nairn near Inverness, Scotland. It is a scheduled monument.

== Architecture ==
The courtyard to the south of the hall incorporates a steep granite outcrop and a wall standing to about 9 feet (2.7 m) in height and approximately 2.5 feet (0.76 m) thick. The hall-house measures approximately 54 feet (16 m) by 22 feet (6.7 m) and stands up to 36 feet (11 m) in height. The ground floor was used for storage, while the upper hall was entered from an external stair and defended by a portcullis and drawbar. The walls of the castle are nearly 6 feet (1.8 m) thick. A tower projects from one corner of the castle and there is a garderobe tower on the west side that projects nearly 13 feet (4.0 m).

== History ==
The castle was originally a property of the Comyn family, who took the name of de Rait. Sir Alexander Rait killed the third Thane of Cawdor (chief of Clan Calder), and then fled south where he married the heiress of Hallgreen. The castle later passed from the de Raits to the Mackintosh family and then to the Campbell family.

In 1442, when the castle passed to the Mackintoshes from the de Rait family, a feast was held at the castle between the two families which ended in the slaughter of most of the Comyns and de Raits. The laird blamed his daughter, whom he chased around the castle. She climbed out of a window but he chopped off her hands and she fell to her death. The castle is said to be haunted by her ghost, with no hands.

The Duke of Cumberland is said to have stayed at the castle before the Battle of Culloden in 1746, although the last recorded reference to the castle was in 1596.

American singer Bonnie Raitt is a descendant of the Rait clan, and visited Rait Castle in 1990.
