= Battle of Palm Sunday =

1429 Scottish clan battle

- Part of Clan Cameron-Clan Mackintosh feud
Date	1429
Location	Scottish Highlands
Result	Unknown

Belligerents
Clan Cameron	Chattan Confederation

The Battle of Palm Sunday, also known as the Massacre of Palm Sunday, was a Scottish clan battle that took place in 1429 in the Scottish Highlands between the Clan Cameron and the confederation of Clan Chattan.

== Historical accounts ==
The battle is mentioned in several historical accounts. Walter Bower (c. 1385–1449) wrote about it in his work Scotichronicon, John Major (1467–1550) in his History of Greater Britain, and George Buchanan (1506–1582) in his History of Scotland, Rerum Scoticarum Historia.

== Background ==
The (Mackintosh of) Kinrara MS (manuscript, c.1680) (Note: The Mackintosh of Kinrara manuscript is a history of the Clan Mackintosh that was written in the 17th century and chronicles the history of the Mackintoshes up to the year 1680. It has been published as A Chronicle of the Family of Mackintosh to 1680.) states that just before the battle the Camerons had taken a spreagh of cattle from Strathdearn.

== Battle ==
According to Major, the Clan Cameron and Clan Chattan both having deserted Alexander of Islay, Earl of Ross attached themselves like honest men to the king, but on the Palm Sunday following the Clan Chattan put to death every mother's son of the Clan Cameron. Buchanan stated that many of the Mackintoshes and almost all of the Camerons were slain. The Clan Cameron account states that the Clan Mackintosh who were leaders of the Chattan Confederation attacked the Camerons when they were worshiping in a church and that during the engagement most of the Mackintoshes and almost the whole tribe of Camerons were cut to pieces.
