= Clan MacDonald of Lochalsh =

The Clan MacDonald of Lochalsh was a Scottish family and a branch of the larger Clan Donald.

== History ==
The MacDonald of Lochalsh branch was founded by Celestine MacDonald (d.1476). Celestine MacDonald was the eldest son of Alexander of Islay, Earl of Ross, 3rd Lord of the Isles and 8th chief of Clan Donald. His mother was likely the daughter of Neil or Angus MacPhee of Glenpean in Lochaber, and Alexander may have married her via handfast.

Celestine MacDonald of Lochalsh, with the support of the MacDonalds of Glengarry unsuccessfully claimed the right to succeed his father as Chief of Clan Donald and Lord of the Isles. Instead the right remained with his younger brother John of Islay, Earl of Ross, 4th Lord of the Isles, 9th chief of Clan Donald, the son of Elizabeth Seton. Celestine married Finvola Maclean, daughter of Lachlan Bronneach Maclean of Duart. Celestine was succeeded as chief of Clan MacDonald of Lochalsh by his son Alexander.

Ewen Cameron XIII Chief of Clan Cameron and a large body of Camerons, joined by Alexander MacDonald of Lochalsh, Clan Ranald of Garmoran and Lochaber and the Chattan Confederation carried out on a raid into the county of Ross-shire, now known as the Raid on Ross. During the raid they clashed with the Clan Mackenzie of Kintail. They then advanced from Lochaber to Badennoch where they were even joined by the Clan Mackintosh. They then proceeded to Inverness where they stormed Inverness Castle and Mackintosh placed a garrison in it. The Lords of Lochalsh appear at this time to have had strong claims upon the Camerons to follow them in the field. They were superiors under the Lord of the Isles of the lands of Lochiel in Lochaber, in addition to the claims of a close marriage alliance (Ewen married a daughter of Celestine of Lochalsh).

In 1497 Sir Alexander MacDonald of Lochalsh and his clan rebelled against the King. Lochalsh invaded the fertile lands of Ross-shire where he was defeated by the Clan Mackenzie at the Battle of Drumchatt (1497) and was driven out of Ross-shire. He escaped southward amongst the Isles but was caught on the island of Oransay, by MacIain of Ardnamurchan, and put to death.

When Sir Donald MacDonald of Lochalsh was returning home from the Battle of Flodden in 1513 he was joined by Sir Alexander MacDonnell of Glengarry and Wiland, chief of Clan Chisholm to capture took Urquhart Castle. Some sources say that MacDonald occupied the castle for three years despite the efforts of Clan Grant to dislodge them.

Sir Donald MacDonald of Lochalsh, whose father had been assassinated by Maclain of Ardnamurchan. Sir Donald, who was then attempting to lay claim to the Lordship of the Isles besieged Mingarry Castle, seat of Ardnamurchan in 1515 and again, more successfully, two years later, when he took possession of the castle, which he burned and laid waste the surrounding lands.

John MacIain of Ardnamurchan was killed at the hands of his avenging kinsmen in 1518. Not only for the assassination of MacDonald of Lochalsh in 1497 but also for the deaths of the chief the Clan MacDonald of Dunnyveg and his son.

== See also ==
- Clan Donald
- Scottish clan
