= Clan Mackintosh =

Scottish clan

- Mac-an-tòisich
- Crest: A cat-a-mountain salient guardant Proper
- Motto: Touch Not The Cat Bot A Glove (N.B. 'bot' means 'without')
- War cry: Loch Moigh

Profile
- Region: Highland
- District: Inverness
- Plant badge: Red whortleberry, bearberry, or boxwood

Chief
- John Mackintosh of Mackintosh
- The Mackintosh (An t-Ailpeanach)
- Seat: Moy Hall
- Historic seat: Moy Castle on Loch Moy
Septs of Clan Mackintosh
Adamson, Ayson, Aysons of N.Z., Clark, Clarke, Clarkson, Clerk, Crerar, Dallas, Elder, Esson, Glen, Glennie, Gollan, Heggie, Hardie, Hardy, MacAndrew, MacAy, MacCardney, MacClerich, MacChiery, McConchy, Macglashan, Machardie, Machardy, Machay, Mackeggie, MacKillican, MacLerie, MacNiven, MacRitchie, Niven, Noble, Ritchie, Tarrill, Tosh and Toshach
Clan branches
Mackintosh of Mackintosh (chiefs)
Mackintosh of Killachie (senior cadets)
Mackintosh of Borlum
Mackintosh of Daviot
Mackintosh of Connage
Mackintosh of Strone
Mackintosh of Aberarder
Mackintosh of Corribrough
Allied clans
Clan Chattan
Clan Davidson
Clan Farquharson
Clan Macpherson
Clan MacBean
Clan MacGillivray
Clan MacPhail
Clan Shaw of Tordarroch
Clan MacThomas
Clan Maclean (Dochgarroch branch)
Clan MacQueen (Strathdearn branch)
Clan MacIntyre (Badenoch branch)
Clan Campbell of Cawdor
Clan MacKenzie
Rival clans
Clan Cameron
Clan Comyn
Clan Gordon
Clan Munro
Clan MacDonald of Keppoch
Clan MacDonell of Glengarry
Clan Rose

Clan Mackintosh (Clann Mhic an Tòisich) is a Scottish clan from Inverness in the Scottish Highlands. The chiefs of the clan are the Mackintoshes of Mackintosh. Another branch of the clan, the Mackintoshes of Torcastle, are the chiefs of Clan Chattan, a historic confederation of clans.

== History ==
=== Origins of the clan ===
The Scottish Gaelic word toisiche means leader and can also be translated as chief. The seanachies of the Clan Mackintosh claim that the first chief of the clan was Shaw, second son of Duncan MacDuff, Earl of Fife of the royal house of Dál Riata. In 1160 Shaw MacDuff accompanied Malcolm IV of Scotland on an expedition to suppress a rebellion in Morayshire. In about 1163 he was also made constable of Inverness Castle and was granted land in the Findhorn valley. The heartland of the clan was the lands of Petty which was also the burial place of the chiefs. In 1179 Shaw MacDuff was succeeded by his son who was also called Shaw and was confirmed in his patrimony by William the Lion.

=== Scottish-Norwegian war ===
In 1263, during the Scottish–Norwegian War, Ferquhar Mackintosh, the fifth chief led his clan at the Battle of Largs against the army of Haakon IV of Norway. However, he was killed in a duel in 1265 leaving his infant son, Angus, as heir.

=== Clan Chattan ===
Angus Mackintosh was brought up in the court of his uncle, Alexander of Islay, Lord of the Isles, chief of Clan Donald. In 1291 a splendid match was arranged for Angus when he married Eva, the only daughter of Dougal Dal, chief of the Clan Chattan, which brought Angus the lands of Glenloy and Loch Arkaig. Angus and Eva lived on the lands of Clan Chattan at Tor Castle but they later withdrew to Rothiemurchus. After this the Clan Chattan developed into a unique confederation of independent Scottish clans that was led by the Mackintosh chiefs. However their leadership was unsuccessfully challenged over the centuries by the Clan Macpherson who were part of the confederation. From this point onwards Clan Mackintosh and Chattan history is inextricably entwined.

=== Wars of Scottish Independence ===
During the Wars of Scottish Independence the sixth chief of Clan Mackintosh supported Robert the Bruce.

=== 14th century and clan conflicts ===
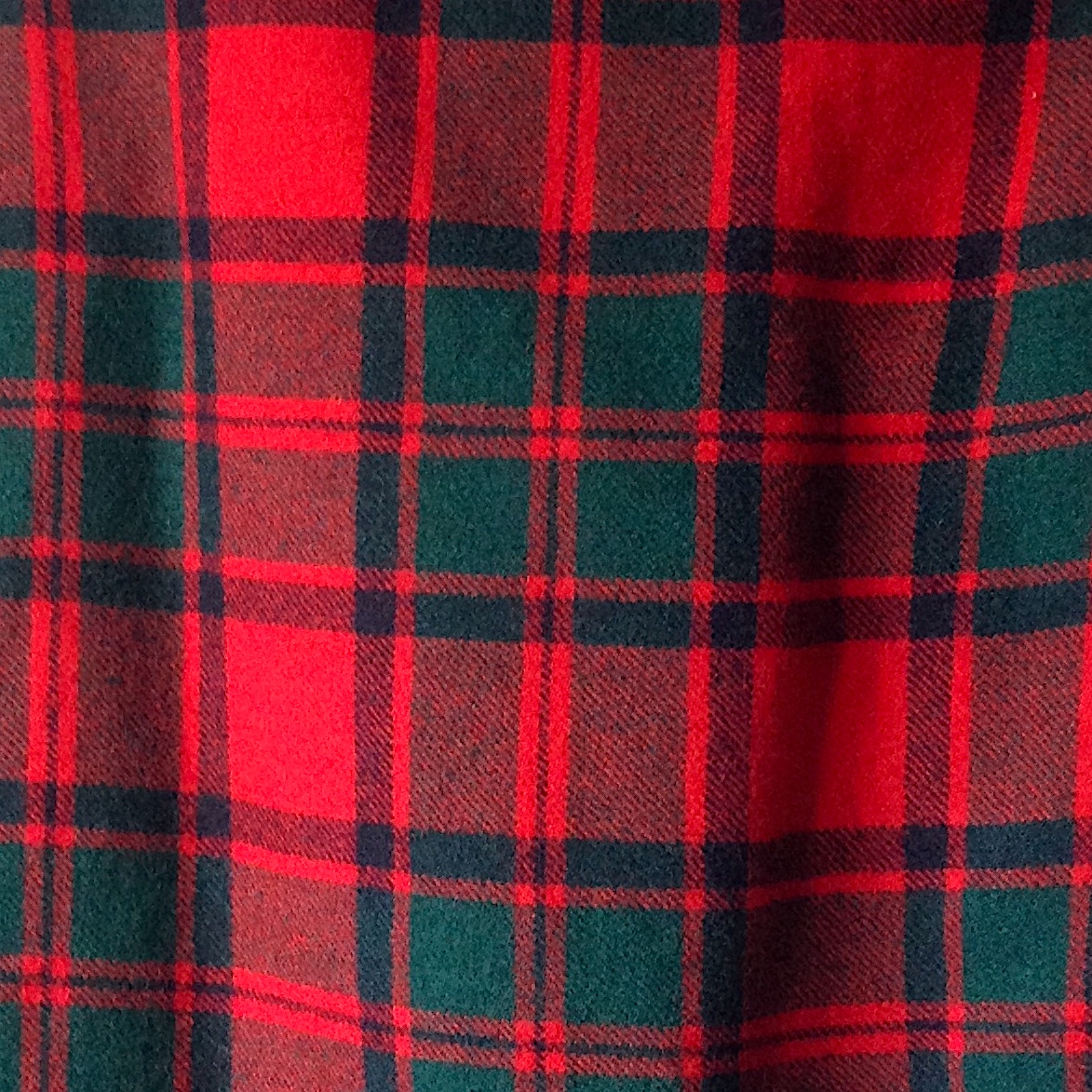
Mackintosh Clan Tartan, STA ref: 521. Tartan date: 1819.

Clan Mackintosh were involved in many clan battles, mostly against Clan Cameron with whom they had an extensive feud which lasted over 350 years:

The Battle of Drumlui was fought in 1337; it was a dispute between the Clan Mackintosh and Clan Cameron over land at Glenlui and Loch Arkaig. The Camerons were defeated but started a 350-year feud. The Battle of Invernahoven was fought in 1370 between the Clan Cameron and the Chattan Confederation of Clan Mackintosh, Clan Macpherson, and Clan Davidson. The Battle of the North Inch in 1396 was fought between the Chattan Confederation that was led by the Mackintoshes and the Clan Cameron, and was one of the most important battles between these two clans.

=== 15th century and clan conflicts ===
In the 15th century, Thomas — known as Tomaidh Mòr (Great Tommy), grandson of William Mackintosh, 8th Chief of Clan Mackintosh — led his kinsmen across the Grampians from Badenoch to settle in Glen Shee in the eastern Highlands, where they became known as McComie, McColm, McComas, and eventually MacThomas, founding what would become Clan MacThomas as the Chattan Confederation grew too large to manage as a single body.

The ninth chief of Clan Mackintosh, Ferquhar had to surrender the chiefship in favour of Malcolm Beg Mackintosh, 10th of Mackintosh, son by the second marriage of William Mackintosh the seventh chief. Malcolm Mackintosh was a strong leader who greatly extended the influence of his clan. He feuded with the Clan Comyn in a dispute that had its origins when the Comyns had feuded with Robert the Bruce. In 1424 the Comyns forcibly took possession of some of the Mackintosh lands at Meikle Geddes and Rait but Malcolm Mackintosh retaliated and put many of the Comyns to the sword. This was in turn retaliated by the Comyns who invaded the Mackintosh homeland of Moy and unsuccessfully tried to drown the Mackintoshes on their island of Moy. A feast of reconciliation was held at the Comyn's castle of Rait however here the Mackintoshes slaughtered their Comyn hosts.

The Mackintoshes fought at the Battle of Lochaber in 1429 which was between forces led by Alexander of Islay, Earl of Ross, 3rd Lord of the Isles and the royalist army of James I of Scotland. The Battle of Palm Sunday, 1429, was fought between the Clan Cameron against the Clan Mackintosh and the Chattan Confederation.

The Battle of Craig Cailloch was fought in 1441: the Clan Mackintosh, led by the chief's son, Duncan Mackintosh, (later the 11th chief), at the instigation of Alexander, Lord of the Isles, began to invade and raid the Clan Cameron lands. A battle took place at Craig Cailloch between the Camerons and the Mackintoshes in which the chief's second son, Lachlann "Badenoch" was wounded and Gille Chaluim, the chief's fourth son, killed. The Battle of Clachnaharry, was fought in 1454 between the Clan Mackintosh and the Clan Munro led by John Munro of Milntown.

The Raid on Ross took place in 1491, where Ferquhard Mackintosh (later the 12th chief), supported Alexander MacDonald of Lochalsh's insurrection of 1491, the Raid on Ross. Ferquhard also subsequently took Inverness Castle using a "sow". The king later imprisoned Ferquhard, along with Kenneth Mackenzie, 8th of Kintail, in Edinburgh Castle. Two years later they escaped, but Mackenzie was killed by the Laird of Buchanan and Ferquhard was recaptured and imprisoned in Dunbar Castle where he remained for sixteen years until being released after the Battle of Flodden in 1513. During the years that Ferquhard was in prison, the affairs of his clan were administered by William Mackintosh who was the eldest son of Lachlan "Badenoch" Mackintosh who was in turn the second son of Malcolm Beg Mackintosh, 10th of Mackintosh.

=== 16th century and clan conflicts ===
Early in 1528, Clan Mackintosh and the wider Clan Chattan suffered a letter of Fire and Sword issued by King James V, who assigned it to the Earl of Moray. The Letter required "utter extermination and destruction" of the clan and its supporters "leaving none alive except priests, women and children" who were to be transported across the sea and to the low countries. This was to punish the clan for the disorder caused in Badenoch following Hector Mackintosh, the chief's illegitimate brother starting a quarrel with the Earl over who would raise the dead chief's infant son. The Earl captured 300 clan males and started to hang them one by one in order to find out where Hector was. Hector subsequently gave himself up and pledged an oath of fealty to the King.

Lachlan Mor Mackintosh, 16th of Mackintosh and his clan supported Mary, Queen of Scots in her victory over George Gordon, 4th Earl of Huntly at the Battle of Corrichie in 1562, where Huntly was killed. According to 19th-century historian Alexander Mackintosh-Shaw, it is likely that Lachlan also fought at the Battle of Langside in 1568 as five days before the battle he had subscribed to a band for the Queen's defence at the town of Hamilton, South Lanarkshire. Of the 136 subscribing barons and chiefs, apart from Mackintosh only two others were Highland chiefs: George Gordon, 5th Earl of Huntly and Alexander Gordon, 12th Earl of Sutherland.

The Battle of Bun Garbhain was fought in 1570 between the Clan Cameron and Clan Mackintosh. Domhnall Dubh Camshròn, XV Chief of Clan Cameron, had died, leaving an infant son, Ailean, at the head of the clan. During the battle the chief of Mackintosh is believed to have been killed by Donald 'Taillear Dubh na Tuaighe' Cameron, (son of the XIV Chief of Clan Cameron), with a fearsome Lochaber axe.

The Battle of Glenlivet was fought in 1594 where the Clan Mackintosh and Chattan Confederation fought on the side of the Earl of Argyll along with Clan Campbell, Clan Stewart of Atholl, and Clan Forbes. They were defeated by the Earl of Huntly's forces which consisted of Clan Gordon, Clan Comyn, and Clan Cameron.

=== 17th century and Civil War ===
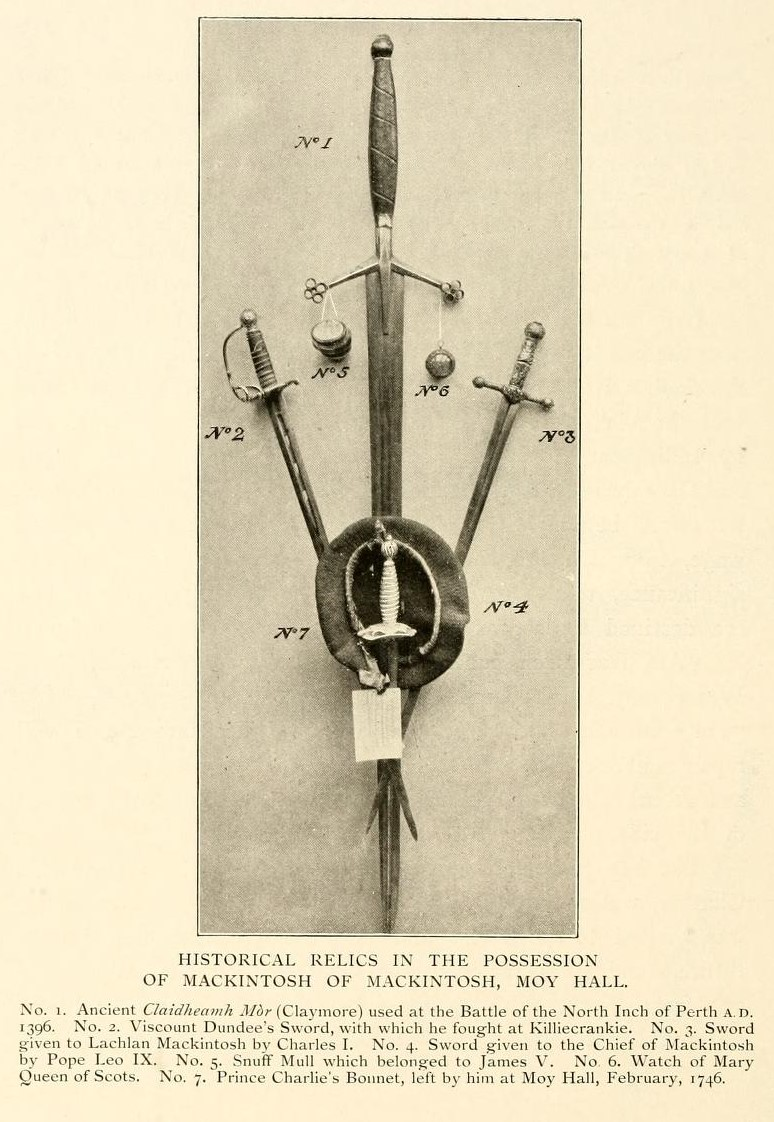
Historical relics in possession of Mackintosh of Mackintosh, Moy Hall.

During the Scottish Civil War the Mackintoshes fought for James Graham, 1st Marquis of Montrose throughout his campaign for Charles I of England.

The Stand-off at the Fords of Arkaig took place in 1665 between the Chattan Confederation led by the Clan Mackintosh against the Clan Cameron.

The Battle of Mulroy was fought in 1668. Clan Cameron and Clan Mackintosh were at peace and Ewen Cameron of Lochiel was responsible for keeping the peace between his men and their former enemies. However, when Ewen Cameron of Lochiel was away in London a feud broke out between Clan MacDonald of Keppoch and their enemies Clan Mackintosh. As the Cameron Chief was away he was not able to hold back his clan and the combined forces of Cameron and MacDonald defeated the Mackintoshes who were supported by Government troops under Kenneth Mackenzie of Suddie.

=== 18th century and the Jacobite risings ===
==== Jacobite rising of 1715 ====
During the Jacobite rising of 1715 the Mackintoshes remained loyal to the Stuart cause. Lachlan Mackintosh led eight hundred clansmen in support of the Jacobites, under his cousin, William Mackintosh of Borlum. However, they were defeated at the Battle of Preston (1715). After this many clansmen were transported to the Americas. General Wade's report on the Highlands in 1724, estimated the combined clan strength of the Mackintoshes and Farquharsons at 800 men.

==== Jacobite rising of 1745 ====
During the Jacobite rising of 1745, Angus Mackintosh, twenty-second chief of Clan Mackintosh was a captain in the British Black Watch regiment. However, in his absence, his wife, Lady Anne Mackintosh raised men to fight for the Jacobite Charles Edward Stuart. Command was given to MacGillivray of Dunmaglas, of the Clan MacGillivray. They contributed to the Jacobite victory at the Battle of Falkirk Muir in 1746. Following this victory Charles arrived at Moy on 16 February 1746 where he was received by Lady Mackintosh. The prince's bed is still at Moy Hall. An attempt was made by five hundred Government troops to capture Prince Charles at Moy, but they were deceived by just five of the Lady Mackintosh's retainers into believing that they had blundered into the entire Jacobite army and fled. This incident became known as the Rout of Moy. At the Battle of Culloden the Mackintoshes and their allies in the Chattan Confederation suffered heavy losses.

=== 19th century estate management ===
The Badenoch lands of clan chief Aeneas Mackintosh of Mackintosh (1770 - 1820) consisted of Dunachton, Kincraig, Dalnavert and South Kinrara (Inshriach). As an absentee landlord, Aeneas Mackintosh showed little interest in these lands until the 1790s, when wartime demands made the extraction of timber from Glen Feshie and Inshriach an attractive proposition. In the late 18th and early 19th centuries the Glen Feshie Wood Company felled trees on his land at Ruigh Aiteachain, floating the logs down the river to the Spey. In 1820, Aeneas was succeeded by a second cousin, Alexander Macintosh, a merchant who owned a plantation in Jamaica. In 1827, he was succeeded by his brother Angus, a Canadian merchant who returned to the Highlands, and in 1833 he in turn was succeeded by his son Alexander (d. 1861). In the late 1840s, the east side of Glen Fesshie was converted into a deer forest for Georgiana Gordon, Duchess of Bedford.

== Chiefs ==
John Lachlan Mackintosh of Mackintosh (born 1969) succeeded as Chief in 1995 and currently resides in Singapore. He was an Integrated Humanities (IH) and history teacher in the Humanities Faculty at Nanyang Girls' High School before retiring in 2022 and is married to a former Language Arts teacher and academic, Miss Vanessa Heng in March 2014, after their engagement in 2013.

== Castles ==
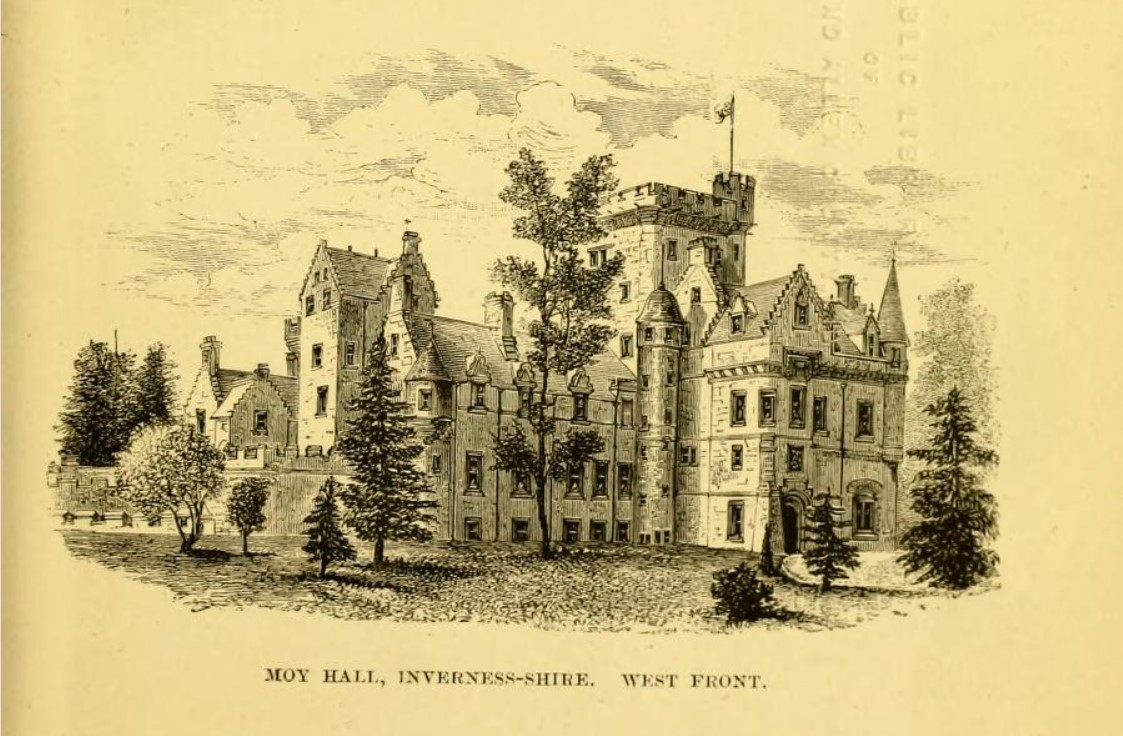
The second Moy Hall, Inverness-shire, seat of the chief of Clan Mackintosh and Clan Chattan, which replaced the first Moy Hall. The picture – which appears in A. M. Mackintosh's 1903 book 'The Mackintoshes and Clan Chattan – shows it in the form it took after its remodelling in the 1870s. This enlarged Moy Hall was demolished in the 1950s

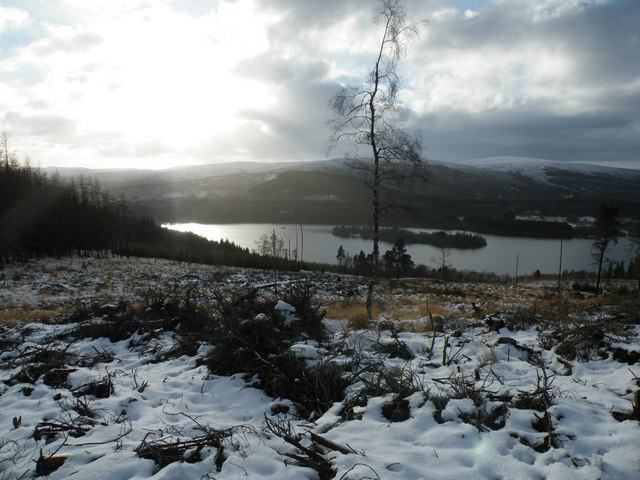
Loch Moy where Moy Castle, the original seat of the chiefs of Clan Mackintosh was placed on an island in the loch. (Not to be confused with another Moy Castle at Lochbuie, Mull that was the seat of the Clan Maclaine of Lochbuie).

Castles held by the Clan Mackintosh have included:

- Moy Hall is the current seat of the Chief of Clan Mackintosh. The original Moy Hall was built in about 1700 to replace Moy Castle which was on Moy Island on Loch Moy. The Moy Hall that was built in about 1700 was accidentally burned down in the time of Aneas Mackintosh, 23rd chief (died 1820). He had another Moy Hall built in about 1800 which in turn was remodeled in the 1870s when the tower and two large wings were added. It was discovered to have dry rot, and despite remedial treatment was demolished in the 1950s. It was replaced with a much plainer house that was built 1955–57.
- Moy Castle on Moy Island, on Loch Moy was the original seat of the chief of Clan Mackintosh in the 14th century. There are now only slight remains of Moy Castle.
- Borlum Castle, held by the Mackintoshes and later replaced by a mansion, the castle was seat of the Jacobite William Mackintosh of Borlum.
- Castle Stuart was granted to James Stewart, Earl of Moray but was once held by the Mackintoshes after they seized it in a dispute over ownership and an agreement was reached.
- Culloden House, near Inverness, is a mansion house that incorporates part of a castle, was once held by the Mackintoshes but was sold to the Clan Forbes in 1626.
- Keppoch Castle, originally the seat of the chiefs of the Clan MacDonald of Keppoch, it was disputed over with the Mackintoshes and eventually passed to them in 1690.
- Rait Castle, near Nairn, Inverness, passed to the Mackintoshes from the Clan Comyn and then from the Mackintoshes to the Clan Campbell of Cawdor. A feast held at the castle between the Comyns and Mackintoshes ended in the slaughter of most of the Comyns and the laird blamed his daughter who he chased around the castle. She climbed out of a window but he chopped off her hands and she fell to her death. The castle is said to be haunted by her ghost. The Duke of Cumberland is said to have stayed at the castle before his victory at the Battle of Culloden in 1746.
- Tor Castle, near Fort William, Lochaber, was held by the Mackintoshes but was seized by the Clan Cameron in the fourteenth century.

== See also ==
- Macintosh, list of people with the surname
