= Raid on Ross =

Scottish conflict in 1491

- Part of Rebellion of Domhnall Dubh
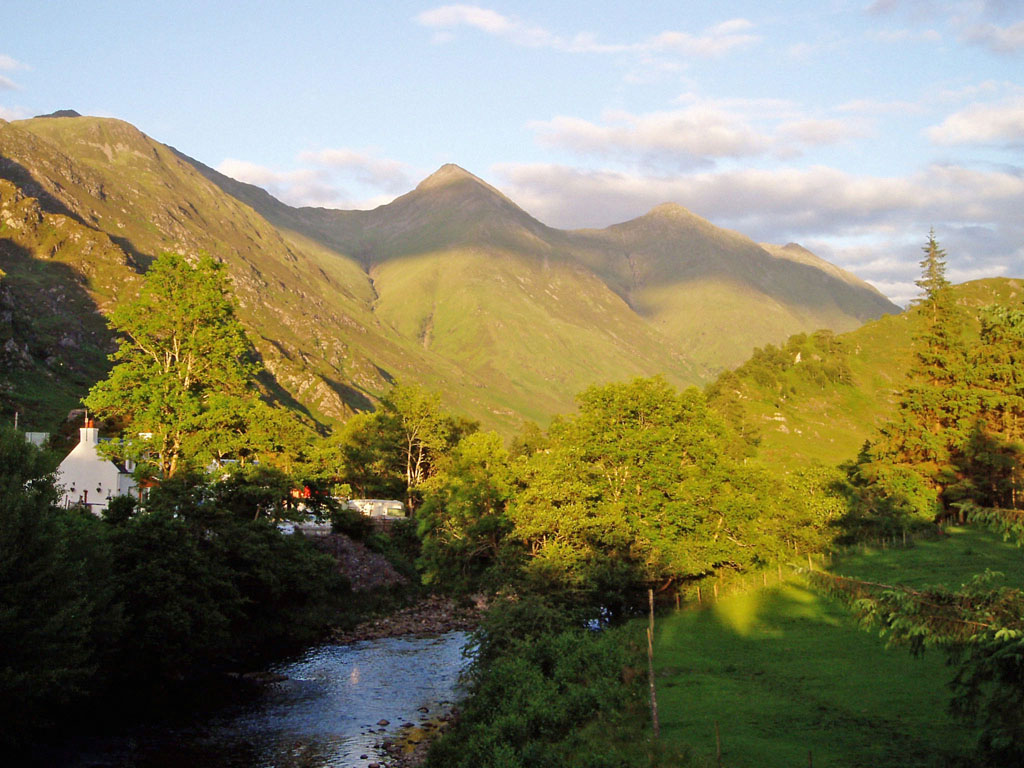
- Kintail home of the Clan Mackenzie in Ross-shire
Date	1491
Location	Ross, Scotland
Result	Unknown

Belligerents
Clan Mackenzie	Clan Donald; Clan Cameron; Chattan Confederation

Strength
Unknown	Unknown

Casualties and losses
Unknown	Unknown

The Raid on Ross was a conflict that took place in 1491 in the Scottish Highlands. It was fought between the Clan Mackenzie and several other clans, including the Clan MacDonald of Lochalsh, Clan MacDonald of Clanranald, the Clan Cameron, and the Chattan Confederation of Clan Mackintosh.

== History ==
Ewen Cameron, chief of Clan Cameron was joined by Alexander MacDonald of Lochalsh, Clan Ranald of Garmoran and Lochaber and the Chattan Confederation.

The Chattan Confederation must have made peace with their enemies the Clan Cameron. Together the clans went on a raid into the county of Ross-shire. During the raid they clashed with the Clan Mackenzie of Kintail. They then advanced from Lochaber to Badenoch where they were even joined by the Clan Mackintosh.

They then proceeded to Inverness where they stormed Inverness Castle and Mackintosh placed a garrison in it. The Macdonald Lords of Lochalsh appear at this time to have had strong claims upon the clans to follow them in the field. The MacDonalds of Lochalsh were superiors under the chief of Clan Donald, Domhnall Dubh, who claimed the title of the Lord of the Isles, which had been forfeited to the crown by his grandfather.
