= Clan Cameron =

West Highland Scottish clan

- Na Camshronaich
- Crest: A sheaf of five arrows, proper, tied with a band, gules, encircled by a belt and buckle.
- Motto: Aonaibh Ri Chèile (Let Us Unite).
- War cry: Chlanna nan con thigibh a' so 's gheibh sibh feòil (Sons of the Hounds, Come Hither And Get Flesh)

Profile
- Region: Highlands
- District: Lochaber
- Plant badge: Crowberry, or Oak

Chief
- The Rt Hon. Donald Andrew Cameron, Baron Cameron of Lochiel
- The 28th Chief of Clan Cameron (Mac Dhòmhnaill Dubh [maxkˈɣõː.əl̪ˠtuh])
- Seat: Achnacarry Castle
- Historic seat: Tor Castle
Septs of Clan Cameron
Chalmers, Chambers, Clark, Clarke, Clarkson, Cleary, Clerk, Dowie, Gibbon, Gilbert, Kennedy, Leary, Lonie, MacAldowie, MacAlonie, MacClair, MacCleary, MacGillery, MacGillonie, MacIldowie, MacKail, MacKell, MacLear, MacCleary, MacLerie, MacMartin, MacOnie, MacOstrich, MacPhail, MacSorley, MacUlrig, MacVail, MacWalrick, Martin, Paul, Sorley, Taylor.
Clan branches
Cameron of Lochiel (chiefs)
Cameron of Callart (senior cadets)
Cameron of Erracht
Cameron of Fassifern
Cameron of Worcester
Cameron of Inverailort
Cameron of Lundavra
Cameron of Glendessary
Cameron of Glen Nevis
Cameron of Clunes
See also:
Cameron baronets
Allied clans
Clan MacDonald
Clan MacMillan
Clan Stewart of Appin
Rival clans
Chattan Confederation
Clan Mackintosh
Clan Grant
Clan Munro
Clan Campbell
Titles
Lord Lochiel
Cameron baronets

Clan Cameron is a West Highland Scottish clan, with one main branch Lochiel, and numerous cadet branches. The Clan Cameron lands are in Lochaber, and within their lands lies Ben Nevis, the highest mountain in the British Isles. The Chief of the clan is customarily referred to as simply "Lochiel".

== History ==
=== Origins ===
Like with many clans, the origins of Clan Cameron's chiefly family are uncertain and there are several theories, as well as fanciful origin legends: such as a descent from Banquo, Thane of Lochaber. The first chief may have been called Cameron from his crooked nose (Scottish Gaelic: cam-shròn, cf. Camshron); such nicknames were common in Highland Gaelic culture, and his descendants would have then adopted the name.

It has also been suggested that Donald Dubh Cameron (fl. 1410), the first authentic chief, was descended from the medieval family of Cameron/Cambrun of Ballegarno (whose name derived from Cameron, Fife; cam-brun "crooked hill"), who in turn descended from the ancient Scoto-Pictish Mormaers of Fife. Moncreiffe of that Ilk corroborated this theory.

=== Uniting the Mael-anfhaidh kindred ===
Around the beginning of the 15th century (or possibly earlier), the Camerons established themselves as a Highland clan in the western end of the Great Glen in Lochaber. The aforementioned Donald Dubh likely did so through the marriage of a local heiress of the Mael-anfhaidh kindred (Clan Mael-anfaidh, which Moncreiffe translates as "children of He who was Dedicated to the Storm"). The Collins Scottish Clan Encyclopedia states that the heiress was from the MacMartin of Letterfinlay family.

By the 15th century, after the Mael-anfhaidh chiefship had passed into the Cameron family, the local families of MacMartin of Letterfinlay, MacGillonie of Strone and MacSorley of Glen Nevis were absorbed within the incoming Clan Cameron. In consequence, the early chiefs of the Highland Camerons were sometimes styled "MacGillonay". Studies of Manuscript 1467 have thrown closer light on the relationships between the Camerons, MacGillonies, MacMartins and others. The MacMartins and MacMillians are also sometimes described as being related to the Old Clan Chattan

Since the 15th century though, Clan Cameron chiefs have been more commonly styled Mac Dhomnuill Dubh, in reference to the first Cameron chief whom succession can be traced. Donald Dubh was the first "authentic" chief or captain of this confederation of tribes which gradually became known as the Clan Cameron, taking the name of their captain as the generic name of the whole, until the clan was first officially recognized by that name in a charter of 1472.

=== Wars of Scottish Independence ===
According to tradition, during the Wars of Scottish Independence, the Clan Cameron fought for King Robert the Bruce, led by John de Cameron, VII Chief against the English at the Battle of Bannockburn in 1314 and later led by the VIII Chief John de Cameron at the Battle of Halidon Hill in 1333.

=== 14th century and clan conflicts ===
It was in the time of chief Allan MacDonald Dubh Cameron, XII Chief of Clan Cameron that a feud began with the Clan Mackintosh and the larger Clan Chattan Confederation over disputed lands. The sept Macphail is found in both clans and relates to some members of this family migrating with Clan Chattan to the east whilst others remained and became part of Clan Cameron. This feud would continue sporadically for about 300 years.

The first recorded battle was the Battle of Drumlui in 1337 in which a dispute arose between the Clan Mackintosh and Clan Cameron over land at Glenlui and Loch Arkaig.

This was followed by the Battle of Invernahoven in 1370, also against the Mackintoshes and Clan Chattan.

The Battle of the North Inch was fought in 1396 as a trial by combat, between thirty selected warriors on each side from the Clan Cameron and Chattan Confederation of Clan Mackintosh.

=== 15th century and clan conflicts ===
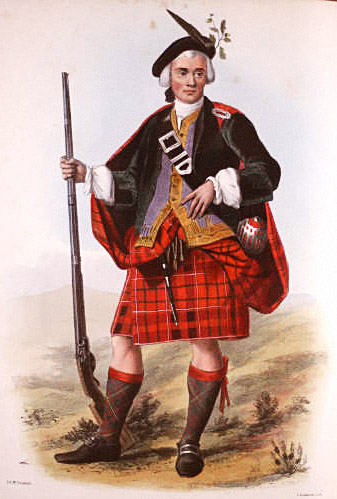
A Victorian era, romanticised depiction of a member of the clan by R. R. McIan, from The Clans of the Scottish Highlands, published in 1845.

In 1411, the Clan Cameron fought at the Battle of Harlaw near Inverurie in Aberdeenshire in support of Domhnall of Islay, Lord of the Isles, chief of Clan Donald who claimed the title of Earl of Ross. Their enemy was Robert Stewart, Duke of Albany.

The Camerons also fought at the Battle of Lochaber in 1429, between forces led by Alexander of Islay, Earl of Ross, 3rd Lord of the Isles and the royalist army of King James I of Scotland. Shortly after this the Camerons again fought against the Mackintoshes and Clan Chattan at the Battle of Palm Sunday in 1429, at the instigation of the Lord of the Isles.

In 1431, the Clan Cameron fought at the Battle of Inverlochy (1431) against the Clan Donald whose chief Alexander of Islay, Earl of Ross had been imprisoned by the king. The MacDonalds were then led by Alexander's nephew, Donald Balloch MacDonald who defeated the royalist army led by the Earl of Mar. In 1439 the Clan Cameron fought against the Clan Maclean at the Battle of Corpach.

In 1441, another battle with the Mackintoshes, the Battle of Craig Cailloc, was fought.

In 1472, Alan MacDonald Dubh, 12th Chief of the Clan Cameron was made constable of Strome Castle on behalf of the Clan MacDonald of Lochalsh. He was later killed in battle in 1480 fighting the Mackintoshes and MacDonalds of Keppoch.

In 1491 the Clan Cameron took part in the Raid on Ross.

=== 16th century and clan conflicts ===
In 1505, during Dubh's Rebellion, the Battle of Achnashellach is said to have taken place between the Camerons against the Clan Munro and the Clan Mackay. During the Anglo-Scottish Wars the Clan Cameron chief, Ewen Cameron and a portion of his men survived fighting against the English army at the Battle of Flodden in 1513.

In 1544, a feud took place over the disputed chiefship of the Clan MacDonald of Clan Ranald and this resulted in the Battle of the Shirts where the Camerons provided archers in support of the MacDonalds against the Clan Fraser of Lovat who were defeated. Legend has it that only five Frasers and eight MacDonalds survived. The Camerons subsequently carried out successful raids upon the Clan Grant and Clan Fraser lands, which were incredibly rich and fertile to the Lochaber men. Owing to his role in this conflict Ewen Cameron fell into disfavour with the Earl of Huntly, Chief of Clan Gordon and Lieutenant of the North. Chief Ewen Cameron would be executed as a result of this battle and other actions at Elgin in 1547.

The Battle of Bun Garbhain was fought in 1570 when Donald Dubh Cameron, XV Chief of Clan Cameron, had died, leaving an infant son, Allan, at the head of the clan. During the battle the Chief of MacKintosh is believed to have been killed by Donald 'Taillear Dubh na Tuaighe' Cameron, (son of the XIV Chief of Clan Cameron), with a fearsome Lochaber axe.

In 1594 Allan Cameron, XVI Chief of Clan Cameron led the clan at the Battle of Glenlivet in support of George Gordon, 1st Marquess of Huntly, Chief of Clan Gordon who defeated the forces of Archibald Campbell, 7th Earl of Argyll, Chief of Clan Campbell.

=== 17th century and Civil War ===
During the Civil War at the Battle of Inverlochy 1645, Clan Cameron fought on the side of the Royalist Scots and Irish who defeated the Scottish Covenanters of Clan Campbell. The clan continued to oppose Oliver Cromwell, and played a leading role in Glencairn's rising of 1651 to 1654.

The Stand-off at the Fords of Arkaig 1665 – a standoff without bloodshed that saw the Camerons finally end their 328-year feud with the Chattan Confederation, led by the Clan Mackintosh.

In 1668, Sir Ewen Cameron of Lochiel, XVII Chief was responsible for keeping the peace between his men and Clan Mackintosh. However, when he was away in London a feud broke out between Clan MacDonald and the Mackintoshes. As Sir Ewen was away he was not able to hold back his clan, and they made contribution to the MacDonald victory over the Mackintoshes and Mackenzies at the Battle of Mulroy, east of Spean Bridge.

The Clan Cameron fought as Jacobites at the Battle of Killiecrankie in July, 1689, the Battle of Dunkeld in August, 1689, and the Battle of Cromdale in May, 1690.

=== 18th century and Jacobite risings ===
During the Jacobite rising of 1715 the Clan Cameron supported the Jacobite cause fighting at the Battle of Sheriffmuir. They later fought at the Battle of Glen Shiel in 1719, after which the 18th Chief John Cameron of Lochiel, after hiding for a time in the Scottish Highlands, made his way back to exile in France. General Wade's report on the Highlands in 1724, estimated the clan strength at 800 men.

When Charles Edward Stuart landed in Scotland in August 1745 he was met by the Lochiel, 19th Clan Chief, who pledged his Clan's full support. The Jacobite rising of 1745 might never had happened if Lochiel had not come out with his clan. The Clan Cameron fought as Jacobites at the Battle of Prestonpans (1745), Battle of Falkirk (1746), and on the frontline at the Battle of Culloden (16 April 1746). After the Battle of Culloden, a wounded Donald Cameron of Lochiel, known as Gentle Lochiel, was assisted by a Clan Chattan MacBain to escape and he eventually took refuge in France, where he died in October 1748.

Jean Cameron of Glendessary, known as 'Bonnie Jean Cameron', was a popular Jacobite heroine, cousin of Lochiel and said to have been a mistress of Prince Charles. Indeed, led by her the Camerons of Glendessary provided 300 men for Lochiel at Glenfinnan. The MacMartins sept of the clan are also said to have been amongst the most loyal and valuable followers of Lochiel. In the 1745 Jacobite rising, the MacMartins were "out with" Lochiel's regiment.

Another Cameron clansman and French Royal Army noncommissioned officer named John Du Cameron, who was known as an Sergeant Mòr, fought as a Jacobite, but remained on the run and continued fighting after Culloden and even after the Act of Indemnity. While being hunted down as an outlaw, Sgt. du Cameron engaged in both cattle raiding and selling protection against theft. He was eventually captured in 1753 and executed, but remains a popular local folk hero. Dr Archibald Cameron of Lochiel who was the chief's brother and a leading Jacobite was also captured and executed in 1753.

The 79th (The Queen's Own Cameron Highlanders) Regiment of Foot was raised from among the members of the clan in 1793 by Sir Alan Cameron of Erracht (1753–1828).

Colonel John Cameron (1771–1815), son of Ewen Cameron, 1st Baronet and grandson of John Cameron of Fassiefern – a brother of the Gentle Lochiel, was another distinguished military commander, whose family became baronets as a result of his martial success.

Charles Cameron (1745–1812) was a noted architect in Imperial Russia, and a favourite of Catherine the Great. His works include Tsarskoye Selo and Pavlovsk Palace. He claimed that he was of the family of Cameron of Lochiel, but was probably of another junior Cameron branch.

=== 19th and 20th centuries ===
==== Highland Clearances ====
After Culloden, Clan Cameron's land was forfeited and reverted to the government. In 1784 it was returned to Donald Cameron 22nd of Lochiel, grandson of the "Gentle Lochiel", who was only 15 at the time. The land was managed by a trust until 1819, when Donald Cameron succeeded to his inheritance. The first clearance took place in 1801 at Clunes. Major emigrations, notably to Canada, began in 1802. The clearances continued under the name of Donald Cameron 22nd of Lochiel when he took over from the Trust in 1819.

The Clan Cameron Museum at Achnacarry has a display of Cameron history including an account of the Cameron clearances. The library also has copies of the books referenced in this section.

Some traditional Cameron land, on the eastern side of Loch Lochy, was not returned in 1784. In 1770 control had passed to the Duke of Gordon who proceeded to raise rents and clear the land with the aid of his Factor, the Revd John Anderson. The Duke's clearances from the Lochaber Estate through his reverend factotum went on until 1806.

Many Camerons around the world trace their origins to people removed from their lands during the Highland Clearances.

==== Napoleonic Wars ====
During the Revolutionary War and Napoleonic Wars, John Cameron of Fassiefern fought with distinction in widespread theatres from 1793 onwards, before being killed at the head of the 92nd Regiment at Quatre Bras, two days before Waterloo.

Donald Cameron of Lochiel, XXIII Chief fought with distinction at the Battle of Waterloo with the Grenadier Guards. He retired in 1832. Later that same year he married Lady Vere Hobart, daughter of Hon. George Vere Hobart and sister of the 6th Earl of Buckinghamshire. Vere Hobart was descended from the Camerons of Glendessary through her mother Janet Maclean (Hobart's second wife), daughter of Alexander Maclean of Coll and Catherine Cameron, daughter of Allan Cameron, 5th of Glendessary (sister of famed Jean Cameron of Glendessary).

A commemorative obelisk is to be found at Fort William honoring the bravery of Col John Cameron, who died at Quatre Bras, part of the Battle of Waterloo.

==== World War I ====
During World War I Sir Donald Walter Cameron of Lochiel, KT XXV Chief raised four additional battalions of the Queen's Own Cameron Highlanders. In 1934, he was appointed a Knight of the Thistle.

==== World War II ====
Notably, the Cameron Highlanders were the last battalions that wore the kilt in battle, due to the purposeful delaying of orders by commanding officers in the battalions (no one wanted to give up the kilt) and a surprise attack by the Germans (successfully repelled). For this they earned the nickname of 'Ladies from Hell'.

Sir Donald Hamish Cameron of Lochiel, KT XXVI Chief served with Cameron Highlanders, later becoming Honorary Colonel, and was appointed a Knight of the Thistle in 1973.

== Castles ==
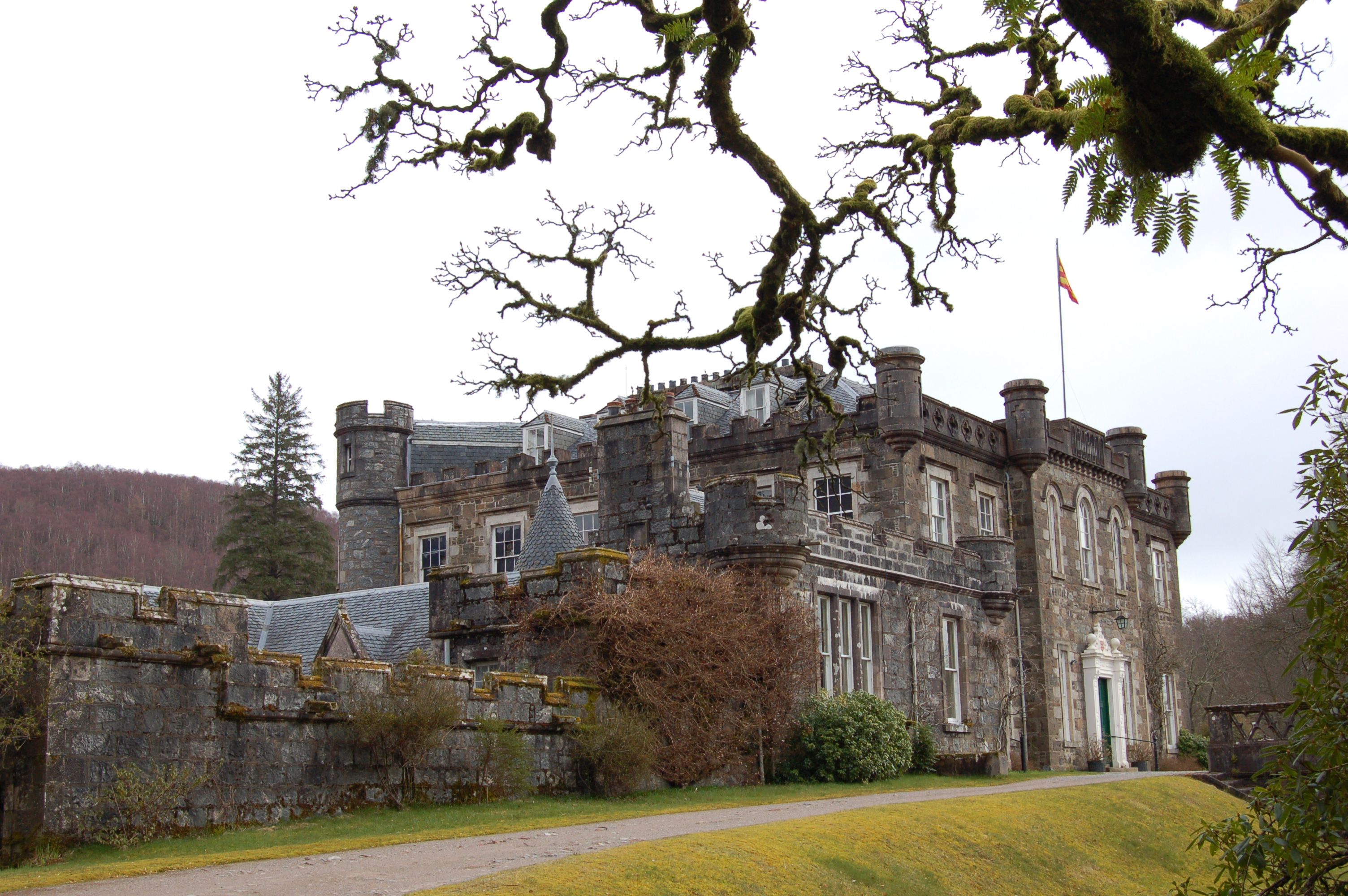
Achnacarry Castle

- Tor Castle: Ewen Cameron, XIII Chief of Camerons, rebuilt "Tor Castle" in the early 15th century. It was abandoned (but not torn down) by his great-great-great-grandson Sir Ewen "Dubh" Cameron of Lochiel, XVII Chief of Camerons. Tor Castle was used by the Camerons as a refuge from attacks by the Clan MacDonald of Keppoch.
- Achnacarry Castle: Chief Sir Ewen wanted a more "convenient house" and built Achnacarry Castle circa 1655, which was burned to the ground by Hanoverian forces following the Battle of Culloden in 1746. In 1802, Donald Cameron, XXII Chief, built a new mansion house at Achnacarry, after repaying a huge fine to the British Government to regain the estates of his ancestors. The house remains, near the line of trees that Lochiel (the Gentle) planted on the day that he heard of the landing of Bonnie Prince Charlie. There is a museum in a cottage nearby, founded by Sir Donald Cameron of Lochiel in 1989.
- The Camerons of Lochiel also had a castle on Eilean nan Craobh (Tree Island) in the sixteenth and seventeenth centuries.

== Tartans ==
There are several tartans of Clan Cameron.

Tartan image	Notes
	Clan Cameron, as published in the Vestiarium Scoticum in 1845.
	Cameron of Erracht; originated as the regimental tartan of the 79th Regiment (Cameronian Volunteers, later Queen's Own Cameron Highlanders).

Others include:

- Basic Clan Cameron
- Cameron of Lochiel
- Hunting Cameron (of Lochiel)

== Crests ==
There are two crests that can be worn, the original Dexter Arm crest and the Five Arrows crest representing the five united branches of the clan with a band under the overall leadership of the Camerons of Lochiel. The five branches are:

- The MacMartins or Camerons of Letterfinlay;
- The Camerons of Glen Nevis;
- The Camerons of Callart and Lundavra;
- The Camerons of Erracht and
- The Camerons of Clunes.

== See also ==
- Cameron (disambiguation)
- Battle of Culloden
- Jacobite risings
- Eilean Munde
- Lochaber axe
- Cateran
- Raids of Urquhart
- Rannoch Moor and the Loch of the Lost Sword.
