= Duncan Mackintosh (disambiguation) =

Duncan Macintosh or Duncan Mackintosh may refer to:

- Duncan Mackintosh, 11th of Mackintosh (died 1496), chief of the Clan Mackintosh
- Duncan Mackintosh (died 1689), pirate active in the Indian Ocean
- Duncan Macintosh (died 1966), first Commissioner of Police in Hong Kong after World War II
- Duncan Mackintosh, 31st Chattan (died 1966), 31st Chief of Clan Chattan

It may also refer to:

- Duncan McIntosh Company, an American publisher of periodicals
