= Clan Chattan =

Confederation of Highland Scottish clans

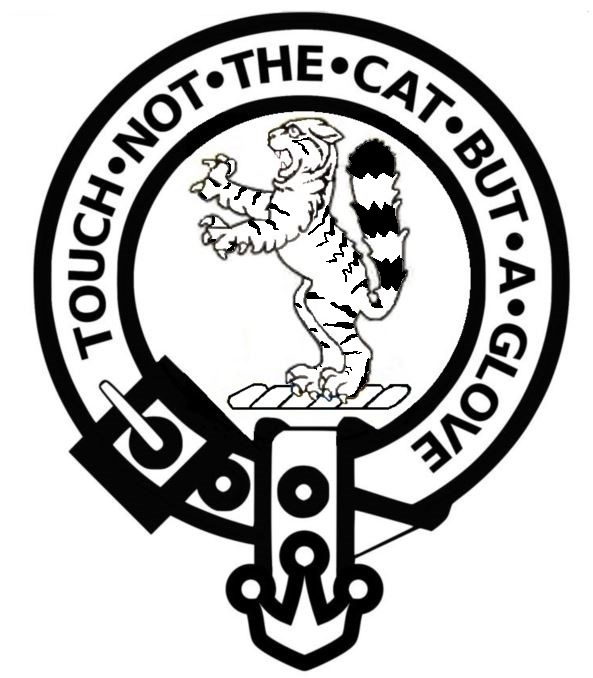

Profile
- Region: Highland
- District: Inverness

Chief
- Malcolm Mackintosh of Torcastle, 33rd Chief of Clan Chattan, a resident of New Zealand represented by John Mackintosh of Mackintosh, 31st Chief of Clan Mackintosh and President of the Clan Chattan Association.
- Historic seat: Tor Castle in Lochaber, Moy Hall in Inverness (current)
Septs of Clan Chattan
Clan Mackintosh, Clan MacPherson, Clan Davidson, Clan MacBean, Clan MacPhail, Clan Farquharson, Clan MacGillivray, Clan MacQueen, Clan Shaw, Clan MacThomas, the Macleans of Dochgarroch, MacIntyres of Badenoch, Clan Tarril (exists as a sept now), Clan Andrish (status unknown)
Allied clans
See each member clan's list but most significantly: Clan MacDougall (early period), Clan Bruce (early period), Clan Donald (early period), Clan Grant, Clan Mackenzie of Kintail, Clan Campbell of Cawdor, Clan Rose, Clan Erskine (Earls of Mar) on occasion, Clan Gordon (Earls of Huntly) on occasion
Rival clans
See each member clan's list but most significantly: Clan Donald (early period), Clan Cumming, Clan Cameron, Clan MacDonald of Keppoch, Clan Erskine (Earls of Mar) on occasion, Clan Gordon (Earls of Huntly) on occasion

Clan Chattan (Scottish Gaelic: Na Catanaich or Clann Chatain), also sometimes referred to as "Clan Dhugaill" (Quehele) after its progenitor Dougall-Dall, is a unique confederation of Highland Scottish clans. This distinctive allied community comprised at its greatest extent seventeen separate clans (currently twelve), who each had their own clan chief recognized under Scottish law, but were further united and bound to the superior chief of the Confederation for mutual solidarity, sustenance and protection in the Middle Ages and early modern period in the Great Glen and Cairngorms. A tribal coalition of this magnitude was a source of apprehension to both the Lord of the Isles and the Kings of Scots and records exist of machinations to "crying doon the Clan Chattan" by fomenting internal dissension.

== Origins and early history ==
There are multiple theories about the true origins of this clan:

- The name Chattan may derive from the Catti who were a Germanic tribe that had been driven out by the Romans.
- Another theory is that the name comes from Catav in Sutherland.
- The most widely accepted theory is that they descended from Gillichattan Mor (or Mòr) who was the great servant of Saint Cathan. Gillichattan is believed to have been appointed the co-arb or bailie of the abbey lands of Ardchattan Priory, by the Lord of Argyll, Duncan MacDougall.

In the time of Malcolm II of Scotland, the Clan Chattan possessed the lands of Glen Loy and Loch Arkaig. It was then that Tor Castle became the clan chief's seat. Not much is certain about the history of the clan until towards the end of the 13th century.

=== The merging of the Chattan and Mackintosh clans ===
Eva (most probably incorrectly anglicized from Aife), daughter and heiress of Gilpatric or Dougal Dall, 6th chief of Clan Chattan in Lochaber, married Angus Mackintosh, 6th chief of Clan Mackintosh, in 1291. Thus Angus Mackintosh also became 7th chief of Clan Chattan. Some members of alternative male inheritance lines have however questioned the validity of this decision through a female line, has led to occasional discord. Neither side of this dispute has questioned the historicity of Aife, merely the inheritance line.

=== Migration out of Lochaber ===
The couple resided at Tor Castle before withdrawing to Rothiemurchus, apparently due to the enmity of Aonghus Óg of Islay, chief of Clan Donald, the uncle of Angus Mackintosh. Tradition has it that he had intended to marry Eva off to one of his family members, and in so doing acquire the Clan Chattan lands. As a result, the lands at Arkaig were occupied by Clan Cameron who claimed that they had been abandoned. This was the beginning of a long and bitter feud that was fought between the Clan Chattan and Clan Cameron until 1666.

Another reason for the migration, explained in MacPherson clan traditions, is that in 1309, Robert the Bruce offered the lands of Badenoch to them if they destroyed the Bruce's enemies, the Clan Comyn.

=== Earliest written documents ===
The earliest official document, the MS 1467, which recognises the Clan Chattan is dated 1467; but the chronicler Bower, writing about 1440, speaks of Clan Chattan in 1429. Bellenden, in his translation of Boece, about 1525, is the first who mentions this clan having been at the Inches in Perth in 1396, and this probably owing to a misprint in the original, of Clan Quhete for Quhele. He referred to it as Quhattan.

== From singular clan to Confederation ==
Prior to the 14th century, the Clan Chattan was a conventional clan. However it evolved into an alliance or confederation of at least seventeen clans, which was made up of:

1. the descendants of the "blood" or the original clan (Clan Cattanach, Clan Vurich/Clan MacPherson, Clan MacPhail and Clan Dhai/Clan Davidson (according to Skene) and possibly Clan Vean/Clan MacBean (or McBain)). The MacMartins of Clan Cameron and Clan MacMillan are also sometimes described as having been originally related to the Old Clan Chattan but having parted ways.
2. the Clan Mackintosh and their cadet branches (Clan Shaw, Clan Farquharson, Clan MacThomas) and Clan Davidson (according to the Kinrara MS, the clan's principal account of their origins and early history).
3. families who were not originally related by blood or who took protection: Clan MacGillivray (joined early around 1268), Clan Tearlach/the Macleans of Dochgarroch,, the Clan Revan/MacQueens of Strathdearn who came as protectors of a bride and the Clan Inteir/MacIntyres of Badenoch. Other lesser-known clans are also recorded:
  - The Vic Gories, who took protection around 1369.
  - The Dhus of Strathnairn, who took protection around 1373.
  - Clan Slioch Gow Chruim/The Gows or Smiths, who took protection around 1399.
  - Clan Clerich/The Clarks, who took protection around 1400.
  - Clan Tarril: the Kinrara MS also states, "In the time of Lachlan (8th of Mackintosh, who died in 1407), a small clan from Strathnairn settled in Petty, becoming followers of Mackintosh." Within two generations however, their status changed. Gillespie, a brother of the Earl of Ross, entered Petty with reivers driving off cattle and inhabitants. The invaders were surprised at Culloden by Duncan and two other sons of Malcolm Mackintosh, who recovered the stolen goods, but were too late for Clan Tarril, nearly all of whom were slain.
  - The Sliochd Gillie vor (mhòr?) MacAonas who took protection around 1485.
  - The Finlay Cheir who took protection around 1502. and
  - 'Clan an t-Saoir', Clan Andrish or the MacAndrews ('Clan Gillandrish'). The Kinrara MS states that a Donald MacGillandris was part of a bridal retinue of Mora MacDonald of Moidart, future wife of the 10th Chief of Mackintosh. Settled at Connage in Petty, this family is mentioned in a royal summons for the "Maisterfull spoliatioun" of Halhill in 1513 with Dougal Mor Mackintosh.

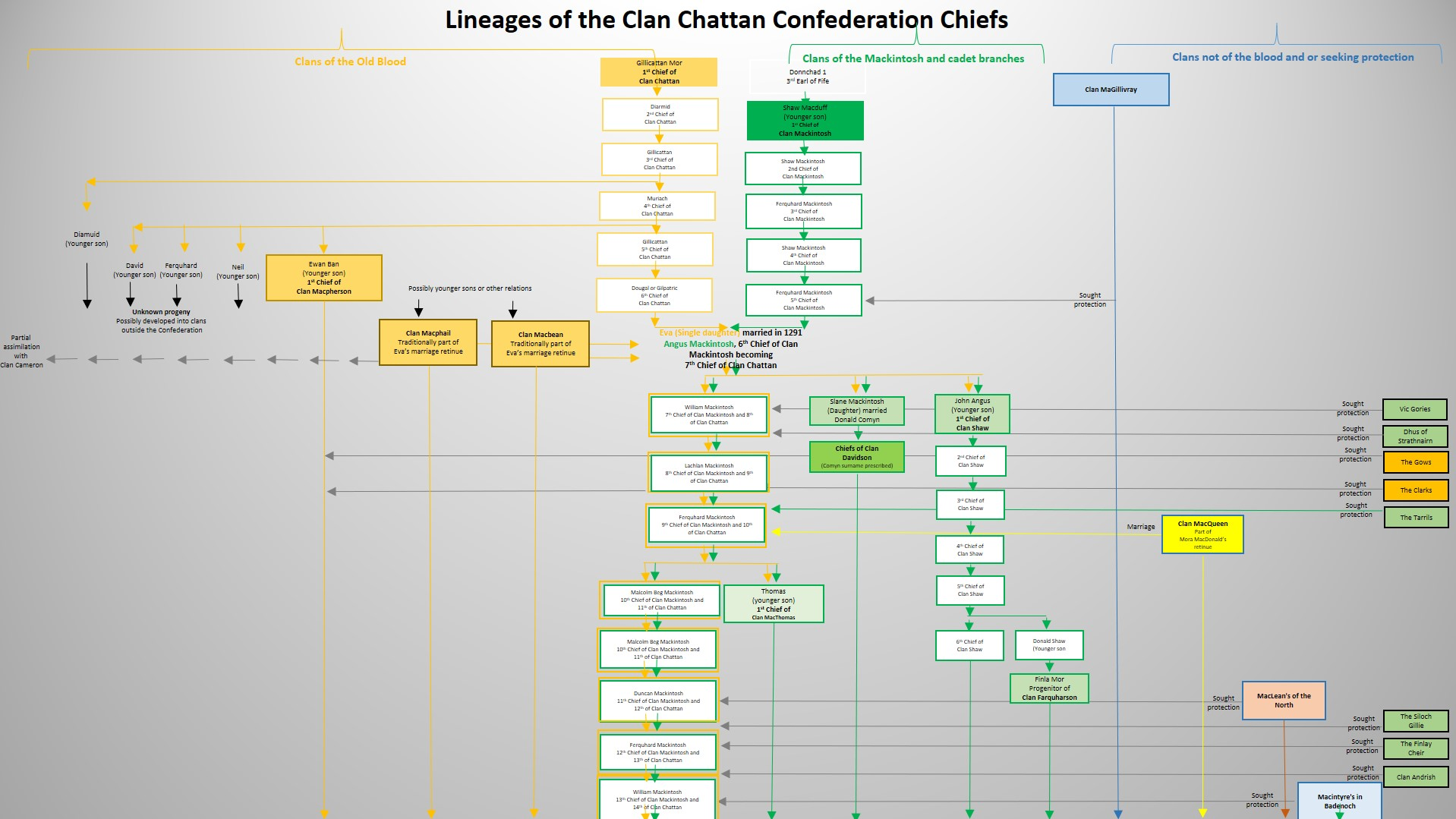
Lineages of the ancestries and merging of Clans Chattan and MacKintosh, forming the early Confederation. Based on the recorded genealogies of clans Macpherson, Davidson and Mackintosh (click to enlarge).

Another unique process was the assimilation of other clans' septs by force, such as the MacNivens, a sept of Clan Comyn. With the invasion of Badenoch by Clan MacPherson under instruction from Robert the Bruce, Comyn allies such as the MacNivens were attacked and their lands seized. This led to events such as the Nine Sons Incident and the Siege of the Cellar. With no male heirs left, the MacNiven co-heiresses agreed to marriage to the Mackintosh lairds, becoming a protected sept of the Mackintosh and stopping further attacks by the Macphersons. Details of this arrangement can be found in The Gordon Castle Indenture, a primary legal record dated 23 September 1475

=== The Skene assumption ===
William Forbes Skene, however, gave a different version of how Clan Chattan was formed prior to the Mackintosh alliance. Clan Vuirich (Clan MacPherson) and Clan Day (Clan Davidson) were the original co-founders and referred to as old Clan Chattan. Added to these were six "stranger septs" who took protection from the clan. These were Clan Vic Ghillevray (Clan MacGillivray), the Clan Vean (Clan MacBean), the Clan Vic Govies, the Clan Tarrel, the Clan Cheanduy, and the Sliochd Gowchruim or Smiths.

However, Skene's phrase about "stranger septs" and the names linked to them is not supported by any of the works of the respected Clan Chattan historians, and may therefore be a historical error by Skene, whose shortcomings have been noted by later writers – one of Skene's harshest critics was the Scottish philologist Alexander MacBain.

=== Sir Æneas Mackintosh/Charles-Fraser Mackintosh assumption ===
Noted historian of Clan Chattan, Charles Fraser-Mackintosh, in his 'An Account of the Confederation of Clan Chattan; its kith and kin' (the work known as 'Minor Septs of Clan Chattan') published a list of 16 associated tribes of Clan Chattan, along with an associated date reference, as written down by Sir Æneas Mackintosh. It begins with The Clan vic Gillivray, 1271. The second clan is The Clan Wurrich (Macpherson), 1291 and the third is The Clan Vean (Macbeans), 1292; then the fourth is The Clan Day (Davidsons), 1350. Others follow including (No.9) The Clan Tearlich (Macleans of the North), 1400, (No.10) The Clan Revan (Macqueens), 1400 and (No.14) The Clan Phail (Macphails), 1500.

In his 'The Mackintoshes and Clan Chattan' (1903), A. M. Mackintosh arranges his chapters to provide a history of Clan Chattan, its chiefs and its Mackintosh branches, then in Chapter XV details the 'Tribes and Families of Clan Chattan other than the Mackintoshes of Inverness-shire'.

- He begins (page 405) with the heading 'Clans Springing from the Mackintoshes': the Shaws, the Farquharsons, the Mackintoshes of Dalmunzie, the McCombies and Clan Thomas.
- Then A. M. Mackintosh comes to Part II of this chapter headed 'Clans Supposed to be of the Blood of the Old Clan Chattan' (i.e. not Mackintoshes, but members of Eva's family): the MacPhersons, the Cattanachs, the MacBeans and the MacPhails.
- The author then covers in Part III of the same chapter, headed (page 496) 'Clans Not of the Blood of either MackIntoshes or Old Clan Chattan': the MacGillivrays, the Davidsons, the Macleans of Dochgarroch, Clan Tarril, the Smiths or Gows, the MacQueens or Clan Revan, Clan Andrish and the Clarks or Clan Chlerich.

=== The members today ===
Today, the Clan Chattan Association, which is based in Scotland with members across the world, comprises the following twelve principal clans:

- Clan Davidson
- Clan Farquharson
- Clan MacBean
- Clan MacGillivray
- Clan Mackintosh
- Clan MacPhail
- Clan MacPherson
- Clan MacQueen of Strathdearn
- Clan MacThomas
- Clan Shaw
- The MacIntyres in Badenoch
- The Macleans of Dochgarroch (the Macleans of the North), (See 15th century Battle of Harlaw)

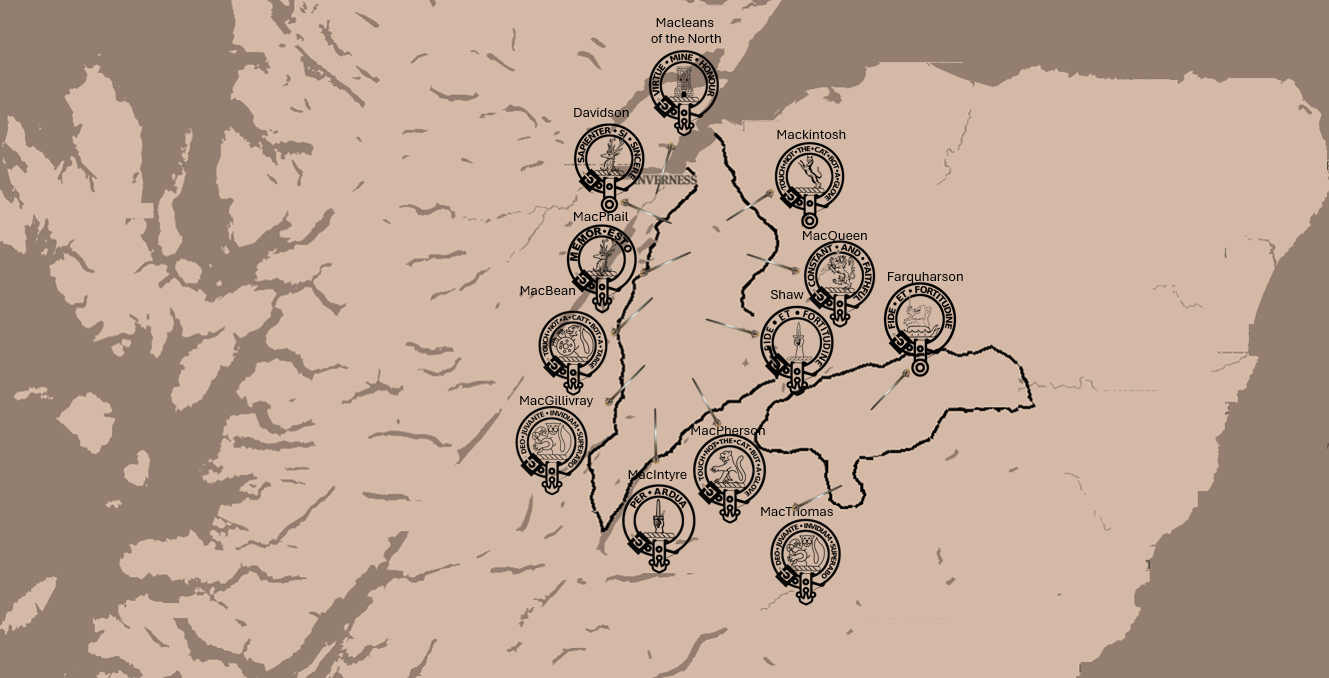
Approximate location of the different clans throughout the Confederation lands. Note: Clan boundaries were known to change over time and were not static. This is a general map of Clan Chattan lands at their greatest extent. This map also does not include any temporary Mackintosh lands in the Lochaber district.

== Chiefs ==
=== Old Chattan Chiefs ===
The following is a list of the traditional chiefs of the Clan Chattan before marriage between Aife/Eva, heiress of Clan Chattan, with the Chief of Clan Mackintosh, through whose marriage a new line of Mackintosh Captains (Chiefs) of Clan Chattan was created :

| No. | Name |
|---|---|
| 1 | Gillicattan Mor, first known chief of Clan Chattan |
| 2 | Diarmid |
| 3 | Gillicattan, |
| 4 | Muirach, father of Gillicattan, and Ewan Ban, father of the 3 branches of Clan Macpherson |
| 5 | Gillicattan |
| 6 | Dougal or Gilpatric, his daughter married Angus Mackintosh, 6th chief of Clan Mackintosh, thus Mackintosh became 7th chief of Clan Chattan. |

Thereafter the Chiefs of Clan Mackintosh are also the Chiefs of Clan Chattan. See: Chiefs of Clan Mackintosh.

=== The Chattan Confederation Chiefs ===
Each Clan in the Confederation retained their chiefs, but acknowledged the Mackintosh chief as the overall Captain of the Confederation.

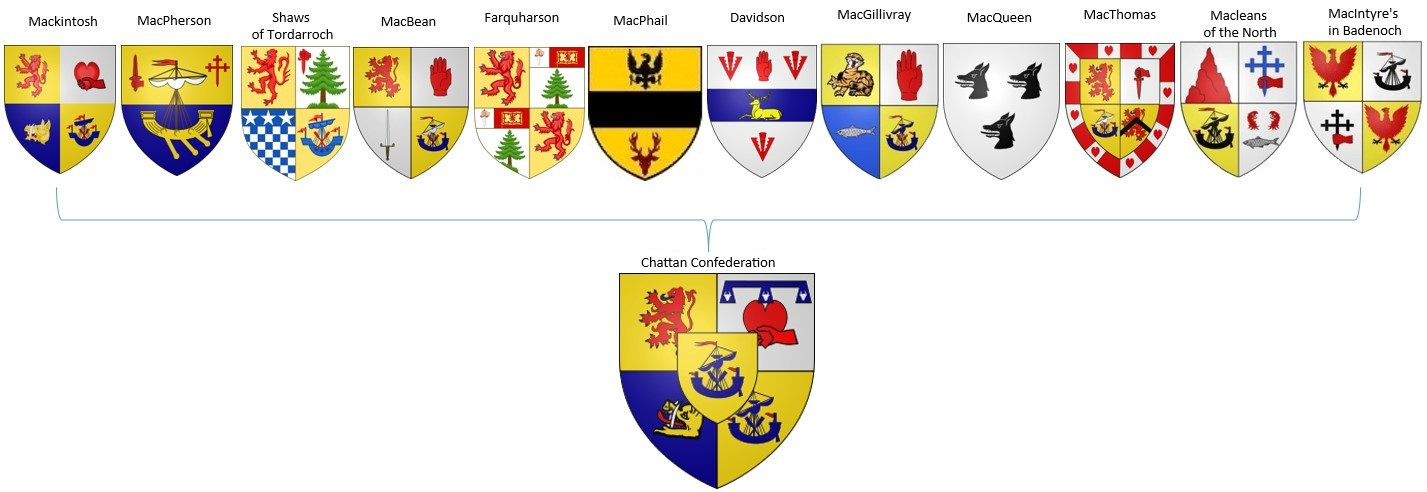
Arms of all the Clan Chiefs in the Clan Chattan Confederation

=== The separation of titles ===
In 1942, the Lyon Court separated the leadership of Clan MacKintosh and Clan Chattan. The leadership of Clan Chattan passed to the Mackintosh of Torcastle line. The Chief of Clan Mackintosh had been at the same time Captain of Clan Chattan, until the death of Alfred Donald Mackintosh of Mackintosh CBE, who chose as his heir to the Mackintosh inheritance Rear-Admiral Lachlan Donald Mackintosh CB DSO DSC. The omission of a stipulation in Alfred's will, concerning inheritance of the captaincy of Clan Chattan, led The Lord Lyon of the day to create the historic separation of the two titles. Lachlan became The Mackintosh of Mackintosh, and his cousin Duncan Alexander Eliott Mackintosh became Mackintosh of Mackintosh-Torcastle, and Head of the hail kin of Clan Chattan.

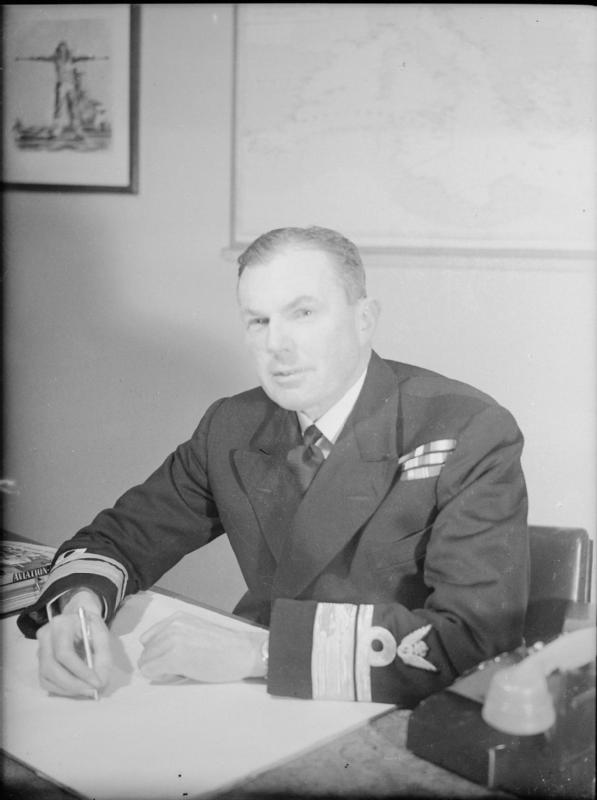
Rear Admiral L.D. Mackintosh WWII

At this juncture the chieftainship of Mackintosh and Clan Chattan split.

The last few Clan Chattan Confederation chiefs therefore were:

- Duncan Alexander Eliott Mackintosh of Mackintosh-Torcastle, born 1 December 1884 and died 29 May 1966. He married Ellen Primrose Smith and they had three sons and two daughters.
- Kenneth Mackintosh, born 23 November 1916, who became the 32nd Chief of Clan Chattan. He married Margaret Farmer and had two children.
- Duncan Alexander John Mackintosh, born in 1946, according to Burke's Peerage.
- However, a genealogy published in an updated history of the Clan Mackintosh noted that Duncan died young, and that his younger brother Malcolm Mackintosh (born 20 October 1950) succeeded their father, who died in 1976, as 33rd Chief of Clan Chattan, becoming styled as Malcolm Mackintosh of Mackintosh-Torcastle and Clan Chattan.

Clan Mackintosh therefore remains the principal clan of the Clan Chattan Confederation and the current and past Mackintosh of Mackintosh has been President of the Clan Chattan Association.

== Battles, Skirmishes and Raids ==
Clan Chattan as a whole or as individual clans were involved in the following events:

- Scottish–Norwegian War
  - 1263 Battle of Largs
- Wars of Scottish Independence
  - 1314 Battle of Bannockburn
- 1337 Battle of Drumlui
- Second War of Scottish Independence
  - 1346 Battle of Neville's Cross
- 1370 Battle of Invernahavon
- 1380–1390(?) Massacre of Dun Dige. A MacSorley chief of Glen Nevis invited Clan Chattan to a dinner to discuss a peace. His piper apparently played their war pibroch which resulted in the Chattan seeing this as an insult. They returned later in the evening and massacred the MacSorleys. The remnants of the MacSorelys would go on to merge with Clan Cameron.
- 1391 Raid of Angus by Clan Shaw and led by the Wolf of Badenoch, an illegitimate son of King Robert II.
- 1396 Battle of the North Inch, Judicial combat.
- 1407 Invasion of Chattan lands by brother of Earl of Ross, Chattan Clan Tarril completely slain.
- 1411 Battle of Harlaw
- 1420 The Macleans of the North hang several Camerons from the walls of Castle Spioradain.
- 1424 Clan Shaw ambush and skirmish with Clan Comyn at Lag na Cuimenach near Loch Pityloulish.
- 1424 Comyns invasion of Mackintosh lands at Meikle, Geddes and Rait, as well as subsequent attack on Moy where they unsuccessfully tried to drown the Mackintoshes on their island of Moy. Subsequent reconciliation between the two parties at the Rait Castle led to the slaughter of the Comyn hosts.
- 1429 Battle of Palm Sunday, after a spreagh of cattle was stolen from Strathdearn apparently by some Camerons.
- 1429 Battle of Lochaber
- 1431 Battle of Inverlochy
- 1441 Battle of Craig Cailloch
- 1450 Clan MacPherson retaliatory raid on the Clan Comyn (MacNivens) for stealing cattle near Raitt's Cave.
- 1454 Battle of Clachnaharry, skirmish with Clan Munro on passage money demanded by Clan Mackintosh.
- 1491 Raid on Ross
- 1526 Hector Mackintosh, uncle of the infant chief of Mackintosh raised the town of Dyke against the Earl of Moray who had the infant William Mackintosh in his custody
- 1528 King James V issues a commission of Fire and Sword against the entire Clan Chattan with the Earl of Moray to carry out "utter extermination and destruction" of the clan and its supporters "leaving none alive except priests, women and children" in an effort to catch Hector Mackintosh.
- 1531 Clan Mackintosh lay siege to Darnaway Castle
- 1534 Battle of Glasgow Muir see Mackintosh of Killachie
- 1544 Battle of the Shirts
- Anglo-Scottish Wars
  - 1547 Battle of Pinkie
- Mary, Queen of Scots feuds
  - 1562 Battle of Corrichie
  - 1568 Battle of Langside
- 1569–1573 Chanonry Castle, Mackintoshes supported the Mackenzies in besieging the Munros.
- 1570 Battle of Bun Garbhain
- Feudal Lords and Highland Levies
  - 1592 Retaliatory Mackintosh raid into Strathdee and Glenmuick on 10 November, during which four Gordon lairds were killed.
  - 1592 Auchindoun Castle of the Gordons destroyed by Clan Mackintosh in retaliation due to the 6th Earl George Gordon, 1st Marquess of Huntly's, killing their ally, The Bonny Earl O’Moray.
  - 1592 Earl of Huntly with Clan Grant attack the Farquharsons of Deeside slaughtering almost every grown man and kidnapping 60 to 80 children. Huntly had them eat from a pig trough. On a subsequent visit to Huntly by the Laird of Grant, shocked, he took half of these orphans back to Strathspey to raise them as Grants.
  - 1594 Battle of Glenlivet, Both sides
- 1596, the Scottish Parliament promulgated the Act for Punishment of Theft, Robbery, Oppression and Sorning, naming Clan Chattan in its entirety and with other clans such as Clan Gregor and Clan Cameron as "wicked thieves and rogues of the clans". By branding the entire confederation as habitual perpetrators of "barbarous cruelties and daily harrying," the Crown stripped away the legal protections of its members. It gave lowlanders and rival noblemen a blank check to aggressively pursue Clan Chattan families under the guise of executing royal justice. The Chiefs and major heritors such as the Mackintosh and Macpherson leaders were made personally and financially liable for any raiding, cattle lifting, or sorning committed by any man living on their vast territories stretching from Badenoch through the Upper Spey Valley.
- Cattle Raiding Period
  - 1602 Raid on GlenIsla, Largest recorded cattle raid in Scottish history when MacGregors, MacDonells of Glengarry and Clan Chattan, carried away over 2000 cattle, but were subsequently ambushed by the Robertson's of Straloch
  - 1602 Skirmish at Loch Garry, Clan Macpherson ambushes a Clan MacColl raiding party
  - 1602 Battle of Cairnwell Pass, west of Meall Odhar involved a skirmish between the Clan MacThomas and cattle reivers attempting to steal a herd of black cattle.
  - 1604 Raid on the Earl of Airlie, Cattle raid by Finlay Farquharson
  - 1606 Raid on Delreddy, Cattle raid by Donald Farquharson and others
  - 1607 Raid on Gask, Cattle raid by Clan Mackintosh
  - 1612 Raid on Kilvarock, Cattle raid by Clan Mackintosh
- 1618 Fire and Sword: Sir Lauchlan Mackintosh obtained commission against Macdonalds of Keppoch for laying waste his lands in Lochaber. He conceived he had a right to the services of the whole Confederation but some were now tenants of the Marquis of Huntly, but were ordered nonetheless. This offended the Earl of Enzie, the marquis's son, who summoned Mackintosh before the Privy Council, for having, as he asserted, exceeded his commission.
  - 1624 Raid on John Steward, Cattle raid by Gillichallum Mackintosh
  - 1630 Outlaw James Grant of Carron and his freebooters were surprised at Auchnachayle in Strathdon in the night, where a skirmish ensued killing four of the cateran, the rest taken prisoner and sent to Edinburgh for trial.
  - 1633 Clan Farquharson skirmish with Maclaughlins near the Braes of Mar attempting to steal cattle and raid plunder.
  - 1634 Raid on Hew Ross, Cattle raid by Clan Mackintosh
- Wars of the Three Kingdoms
  - 1644 Battle of Tippermuir Royalist Forces levy conscripts in Badenoch mainly from Clan MacPherson
  - 1645 Battle of Alford Royalist Forces levy 300 conscripts from Clan Farquharson
  - 1645 Battle of Kilsyth Royalist Forces levy 300 conscripts from Clan Farquharson
  - 1645 Battle of Philiphaugh Chief of Clan MacThomas withdrew his support from Royalists after this defeat.
- 1665 Stand-off at the Fords of Arkaig, amicable end to feud with Clan Cameron
- 1665 Skirmish in Inverness, between of the MacDonells of Glengarry and Mackintoshes in Inverness resulting in £4,800 in damages and fees for a surgeon.
- 1665 Bandit Raid on Balchirie, another Lachlan Mackintosh operated a cattle lifting gang which with 25 men raided the estate of John Lyon of Muiresk at Balchirie and successfully rounded up about 60 cattle. He was declared a outlaw and was captured four months later and executed in Edinburgh in January 1666.
- 1688 Battle of Mulroy, Fort Dunachton destroyed, Clan MacPherson rescue the Mackintosh chief.
- Jacobite rising of 1689
  - 1689 Battle of Killiecrankie
- Jacobite rising of 1715
  - 1715 Battle of Preston, Clan MacPhails' Tainistear captured and deported to Virginia.
  - 1715 Siege of Culloden House
- Jacobite rising of 1719 see William Mackintosh of Borlum
- Jacobite rising of 1745
  - 1745 Siege of Carlisle a Macbean was said to be the first over the walls.
  - 1745 Clifton Moor Skirmish
  - 1745 Battle of Inverurie
  - 1746 Battle of Falkirk Muir
  - 1746 Siege of Inverness and Old Fort George
  - 1746 Atholl raids
  - 1746 Battle of Culloden

=== Gathering the Confederation for Battle ===
No single gathering point is known to exist for the entire Confederation to have ever used, but several other gathering points have been identified:

- Clach An Airm in Strathnairn: Known gathering point of the MacGillivrays to organise and sharpen weapons.
- Clach na Coileach: Meeting place in the MacThomas lands.
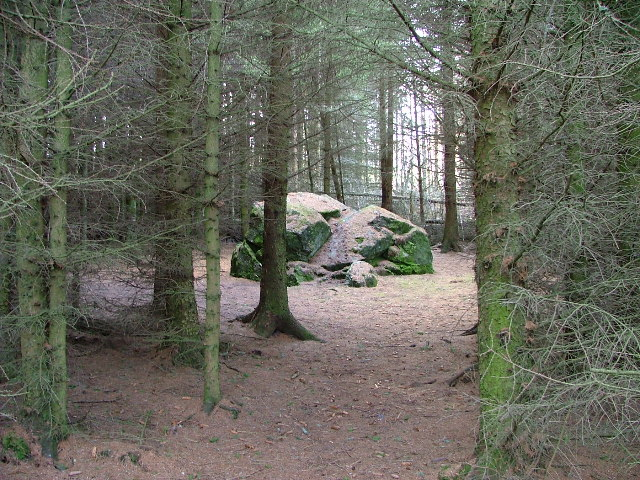
  Clach na Coileach
- Carn na Cuimhe beside the river Dee, east of Invercauld: Known gathering point of the Farquharsons. A fire cross was said to have been sent around the clan lands by runners to notify fighting men to gather.
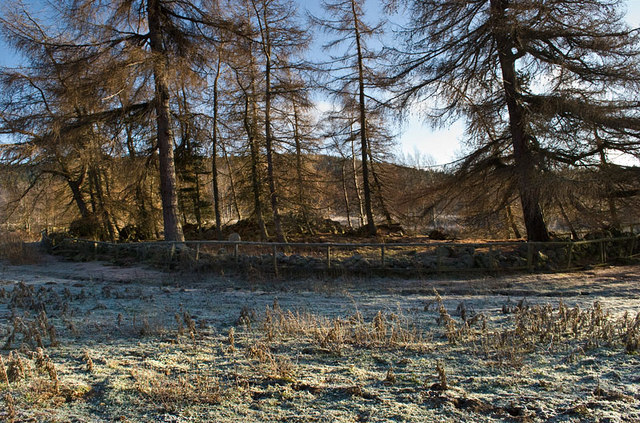
  Carn na Cuimhe
- Creag Dhubh: Known gathering point of the Macphersons, a rocky hill near Cluny Castle in times of emergency.
- Dunlichity Church: Known gathering point of the Mackintosh and nearby MacPhails with evidence of the stone walls being used to sharpen swords.

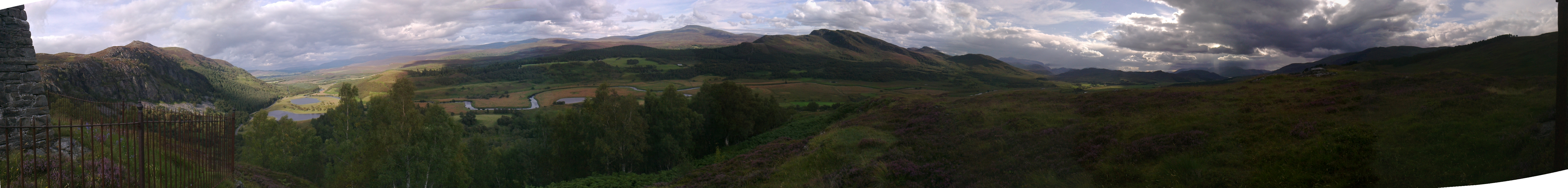
Panorama South from Chattan Clan monument to Sarah Justina Macpherson of Cluny at Creag Dhubh, Laggan, Scotland

==== The Ceann-feadhna ====
It was not always possible for the Captain of the Chattan Confederation/Chief of Clan Mackintosh to lead in a battle. On occasion he was either a infant or too old. In such circumstances these powers would be given to a Ceann-feadhna or a Leader of the Band. Two well known examples include:

- Seath Mòr Sgòr Fhiaclach, Chief of Shaw, as the Ceann-feadhna at the Inches of Perth in 1396.
- Alexander MacGillivray of Dunmaglass, Chief of Clan MacGillivray as the Ceann-feadhna at the Battle of Culloden in 1746.

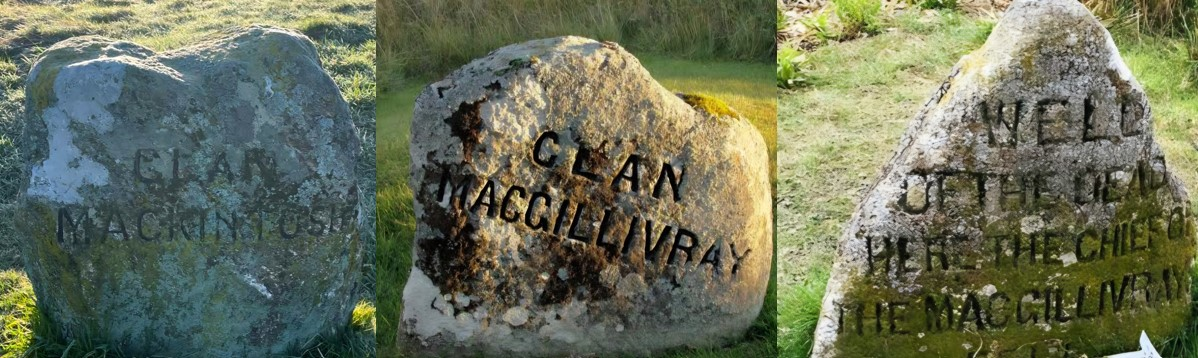
Clan Chattan stone grave markers at Culloden

== Confederation Agreements ==
The list below shows some of the more important agreements of the Confederation in terms of bands of union, friendship, maintenance and manrent.

=== 1397 Band of Union ===
The Chattan Confederation's first band may have been created in 1397 after the Battle of the North Inch, but it only lasted 14 years until 1411 when Clan MacPherson decided to take a different stand from the rest of the Chattan Confederation in regional politics.

=== 1543 Band of Union ===
Signed at Inverness by most of the chiefs of the septs of Clan Chattan, including the Macphersons, they agreed that they would support their chief, William Mackintosh, 15th of Mackintosh, as a vassal of the Earl of Huntly.

=== 1609 Band of Union ===
After the death of Mackintosh of Dunnachten in 1606, the Mackintoshes made an effort to reunite the clan and bring to an end the "controversies, questions, debates and hosts, that has fallen furth betwixt the said haill kin of Clan Chattan these times bygone, whereupon there followed groat incanvanisnciss". The Earls of Mar and Huntly who had been feuding, had fueled this division to gain advantage over each other had also been a major cause of this disunity. The Chattan Confederation came together at Termit about five miles from Inverness in 1609 to sign a new Band.

=== 1664 Band of Union ===
Renewal of the 1609 Band, signed at Kincairne, but with an additional clause of action against Ewan Cameron in response to a Royal Commission seeing the Camerons as rebels at that point.

=== 1727 Band of Subscription ===
Following the Jacobite Rising of 1715, the British Crown and its Forfeited Estates Commission of 1716, targeted the Highlands with disarmament acts and land forfeiture laws such as the Crown Lands (Forfeited Estates) Act of 1715. Lawyers, used intricate property laws to aggressively sue chiefs and strip them of their ancestral estates. The leadership of Confederation realized that if they did not adapt to the legal system, the entire Confederation would be systematically dismantled. An early Clan Association was therefor founded, paid for by subscription and headed by the Chiefs of the MacIntosh and MacPherson younger of Cluny, to raise funds for the employment of lawyers, agents and procurators at Edinburgh, Inverness and Badenoch to attend to any actions and causes by or against the Confederation or any of its branches or members. Speculators also tried to buy up debt notes of Chattan landowners and used the Edinburgh courts to evict families. Whenever a Forfeited Estates court order was issued against a member of Clan Chattan, the fund's lawyers immediately filed countersuits. They used technicalities in old feudal charters to prove the land technically belonged to the superior chief (who had strategically remained neutral or loyal during the 1715 fighting), thereby preventing the government from evicting any minor tenant.

An example of such a case funded by this subscription is from 1756, Alexander, Duke of Gordon, versus Donald MacPherson. The Duke of Gordon looking to break a wadset rental agreement looked for a technicality. He had stipulated that rental be paid in gold, but had been paid in banknotes, which he claimed was contrary to the agreement. This judgement established case law that banknotes was legal tender and saved these MacPhersons from being evicted.

=== 1756 Band of Union (Deed of Consent) ===
The MacBeans of Faillie ventured into land holdings but had developed a huge debt. As the MacBean's estate was not enough to pay off the debt, these lands fell under control of the court. The whole debt, with interests and costs, then fell onto the wider Clan Chattan. The burden, however, was still too heavy, and the estate was of little use to the MacBeans after 1744.

Post Culloden, the lands around Loch Laggan and the wider Badenoch region historically held by the Macphersons of Cluny also faced permanent forfeiture and hostile state redistribution.

In 1756, leading members of Clan Chattan signed the 'Letter of Authority' for Mackintosh to redeem the Loch Laggan estate. Charles Fraser-Mackintosh recorded details of those who signed, in his 'Minor Septs of Clan Chattan' (pages 46-47), with these words:

In 1756 William Macbean consents to Mackintosh's reclaiming the Laggan lands, signing the deed of consent as brother-german and representative of the deceased Donald Macbean of Faillie. The deed is also signed by many others of Clan Chattan, including Alexander Macphail of Inverernie, eldest son and heir, served and retoured to the deceased Robert Macphail of Inverernie; by Robert Mackintosh, Tacksman of Termite, eldest son in life of the deceased Lachlan Mackintosh of Strone; by William Mackintosh of Aberarder, heir and representative of the deceased William Mackintosh of Aberarder, his grandfather; by William Mackintosh of Holme, eldest son and heir of the deceased John Mackintosh of Holme; and by John Mackintosh of Culclachie, eldest son and heir of the deceased Angus Mackintosh of Culchlachie. All these heads of Clan Chattan sign at Gask, in Strathnairn, upon the 27th October 1756, in presence of Donald Macbean, son of Donald MacBean, vintner in Inverness; and Alexander Fraser, farmer in the Mains of Tordarroch. This document is particularly interesting as it is dated several years after the Heritable Jurisdictions Acts, and clan associations.

When the Heritable Jurisdictions (Scotland) Act 1746 came into effect, it abolished such agreements and the powers of clan chiefs. By pooling their resources under Mackintosh, the Clan Chattan Confederation successfully prevented outside political interests from permanently buying up the Loch Laggan basin.

=== 2009 Band of Union ===
To celebrate the 400th anniversary of the 1609 Clan Chattan Band of Union, a new Band of Union was signed in 2009 to renew the clan's historic connection.

=== Other agreements ===
- 1467: Friendship with Lord Forbes and others, on the one part; and Duncan Macintosh, of Clan Chattan, Hugh Rose of Kilravock and others, on the other part.
- 1481: Maintenance between Farquhar Macintosh, son and apparent heir of Duncan Macintosh, of Clan Chattan, to Hugh Rose of Kilravock.
- 1490: Manrent and marriage between Duncan Mackintosh to Cawdor.
- 1527: Friendship between Hector Mackintosh of Mackintosh and Hector Munro of Foulis, Chief of Clan Munro; John Campbell of Cawdor, Hugh Rose of Kilravock, Chief of Clan Rose; and "Donald Ilis of Sleat".
- 1549: Friendship between William Mackintosh of Dunachton and Earl John of Sutherland.
- 1568: Friendship between Lachlan Mackintosh and Earl of Huntly as his superior and confirmation of control of the lands of Benchar, Clune, Kincraig, Schiphin, Essich, Bochrubin, Dundelchat and Tordarroch.
- 1588: Friendship with William Macleod of Macleod, 13th chief of Clan Macleod.
- 1589: Bond agreement between Mackintosh and MacDonald of Keppoch that he would pay 2000 pounds for rent in his lands.
- 1590: Friendship and protection between clans Mackintosh and Grant of Freuchy and against aggressive Earls.
- 1591: Manrent between MacPherson and the Earl of Huntly signed at Huntly Castle.
- 1593: Manrent between Mackintosh of Dunnachten and the Earl of Moray.
- 1595: Manrent between Clan Farquharson and Clan Chattan and acknowledgement of the Chief of the Mackintosh as their superior chief.
- 1609: Manrent between Donald MacQueen of Corrybrough and the chiefs of Clan Chattan.
- 1744: Contract of Watch, preserved under reference code GD80 at the National Records of Scotland (NRS) is legal document detailing the operation of an independent Highland "Watch" (predating the Black Watch Regiment) This agreement outlines the reciprocal duties, funding, and legal structures established between Ewen Macpherson of Cluny and local landholders of Badenoch and Strathspey to prevent cattle raiding and maintain regional order. The explicit mandate of this force was to patrol the strategic mountain passes connecting Badenoch and Strathspey to neighbouring regions. The men of the Watch were tasked with preventing cattle lifters from driving stolen livestock through Cluny's territory. In exchange for this guarantee, the gentlemen legally bound themselves to pay a fixed taxation referred to as "blackmail".

== Internal and external disputes that affected the unity of the Confederation ==
=== Internal disputes ===
- 1370: Between clans MacPherson and Davidson as to which clan would form on the right wing of the Confederation Chief in battle.
- 1464: Between clans Mackintosh and Shaw after Shaw gained possession of Rothimurchus lands from the Bishop of Moray, making them independent of the Mackintosh.
- 1572: Honor killing of Dougal MacPherson by Hector MacKintosh to revenge the killing of his father 21 years earlier.
- 1591: Between clans Mackintosh and MacPherson over the hereditary leadership of the Clan Chattan Confederation and sealing a separate agreement of manrent with the Earl of Huntly. In 1672, Duncan MacPherson of Cluny applied for and obtained from Lord Lyon the matriculation of arms as "the laird of Cluny MacPherson as the only true representer of the ancient and honorable family of Clan Chattan". However, the Chief of MacKintosh at that time successfully sued a reduction and Lyon apparently charged Cluny with adding supporters which had not been really granted in the text of the parchment. MacIntosh was thus upheld as the Chief of Clan Chattan.
- Between clans MacKintosh and MacPherson over the construction of a mill in the same river as that of the existing MacPherson one. This argument led to the Mackintoshes asking the Grants to assist them in the fight to which they refused and the MacPhersons pulling down the incomplete structure.
- Between clans Shaw and Farquharson: a fight between a party from Rothimurcus and Finla Mor Farquharson and his followers over a claim made by Shaws to the lands of Invercauld.
- 1669-1699: twice letters of horning between MacPails and Shaws.
- 1673: Between clans Farquharson and MacThomas over disputed grazing rights in upper Glenisla.

==== Internal Arbitration ====
The 1609 Band of Union refers to twelve prominent men that would act as arbitrators to settle internal disputes, which could no longer be settled by the sword or taken to external royal courts. Any future controversies had to be submitted directly to the Chief along with the twelve. Whatever this council of twelve arbitrated and decided, all parties were legally bound to accept without appeal. Levying of "Cro", traditional fines for injury or slaughter had to be paid immediately in livestock or silver as determined by the twelve, bypassing lengthy external court battles. There is also a recorded agreement dated 4 June 1726, appointing MacGillivray of Dunmaglass arbiter between Lachlan, 20th chief of MacKintosh, and Lachlan MacPherson of Cluny, in any disputes that might arise in the carrying out of an agreement made between the two at Moy Hall on 15 September 1724.

=== External disputes ===
Throughout the 16th Century, the Clan Chattan Confederation was caught up in the machinations of the Earls of Mar, Moray and Huntly, particularly George Gordon, 4th Earl of Huntly, mainly to use parts of the clan in their respective earldoms in disputes between themselves. This led to external attempts to divide the various tribes of Clan Chattan by undermining known internal disputes.

James Stuart, 3rd Earl of Moray tried to take back lands in Pettie and Strathern from Clan Chattan. His father, James Stewart, 2nd Earl of Moray had gifted them for loyal support. This then resulted in an insurrection against the Earl. The Earl then issued at letter of intercommuning against the Clan Chattan, preventing anyone from assisting or harboring clan members under severe penalty. The matter was resolved after large fines were paid and several clan members executed. Details of this issue was recorded by John Spalding, a noted historian of the era.

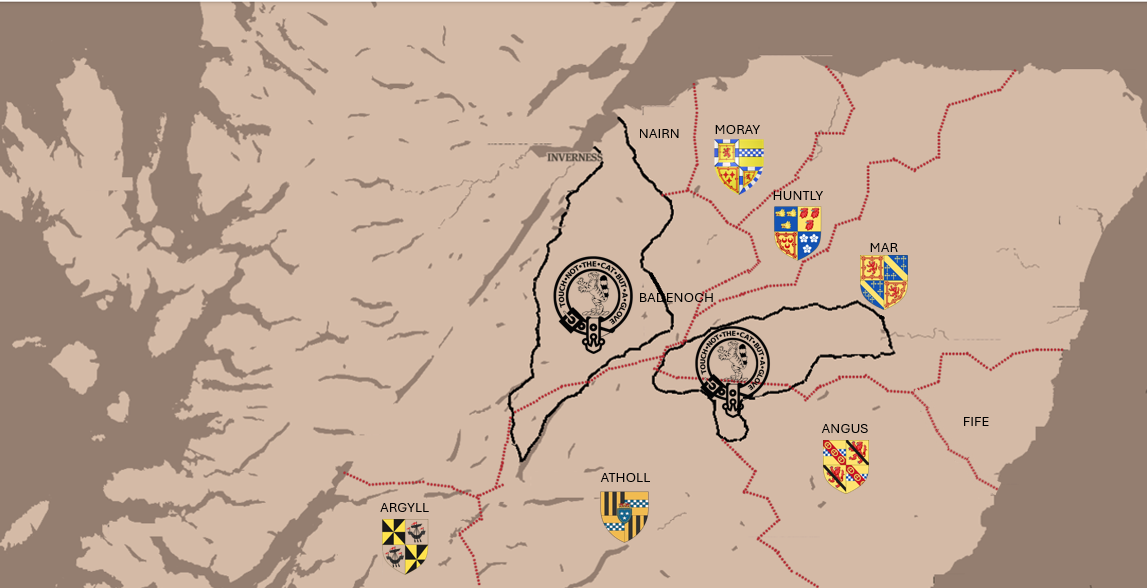
Clan Chattan lands affected by expanding Earldoms circa 17th century

== Post Culloden and Highland Clearances ==
Clan Chattan was not immune to Government reprisals after the Battle of Culloden. Key land forfeitures and consequences included:

- Farquharsons of Monaltrie estate: House torched and burnt to the ground. Francis of Monaltrie was captured and sentenced to death but this was commuted to exile.
- MacBean estates: Kinchyle was heavily plundered.
- MacGillivray estates: The estates of the MacGillivrays, whose chief commanded the Clan Chattan regiment at the Battle of Culloden, were plundered and forfeited for their role in the rebellion.
- MacKintosh estates: The principal Mackintosh estates escaped full confiscation because their chief was serving in the government's Black Watch regiment. However, the loss of tenants (many of whom had fought for the Jacobites) and subsequent government policies, such as the Heritable Jurisdictions (Scotland) Act 1746, greatly diminished the traditional power and land authority of all clan chiefs.
- Macintyres in Badenoch: Parishes of Kingussie and Laggan bore the brunt of the Duke of Cumberland’s scorched-earth policy. Homes, tacks and small stone cottages were systematically plundered and burned.The Badenoch Land clearances of 1797, affected the township of Biallid Beag, the location of an ancient Macpherson/Macintyre cemetery, St. Patricks.
- MacPherson estates: Ewen Macpherson of Cluny, Cluny Castle burnt to the ground, estates in Badenoch confiscated. He evaded capture for nine years before escaping to France in 1755. His lands remained under sequestration until 1784.
- Shaws of Tordarroch estate: Plundered and Chief Duncan Shaw imprisoned.

== From Confederation to Association ==
The activities of the Clan are carried on by the Clan Chattan Association, a descendant of the original association established in 1727 for the purpose of defending the interests of the clan "against all who would seek the injury of any of its subscribers".

In the nineteenth century, many clan societies and associations emerged, with the aim of promoting social interaction between people linked by a common name, and interest in their clan's history. Among these was the second Clan Chattan Association, founded in Glasgow in 1893. Initial support for the association was strong with the meetings, lectures and dances described as "a brilliant success", but it faded out by about 1900. Even so, clan historians of that period produced several works which are still used today.

In the summer of 1933, the third Clan Chattan Association was founded in London. Now based in Scotland, the association has worldwide membership. It organizes a number of activities, such as the annual events in early August at Moy Hall in conjunction with the Highland Field Sports Fair. Members are kept informed of events through the annual journal of the association.

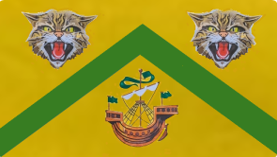
Approximation of Clan Chattan Association Flag circa 2024

=== Modern Council of Clan Chattan Association ===
The council of Clan Chattan Association comprises eight Chiefs, who represent all of the individual clans, as president and Vice Presidents:

- John Mackintosh of Mackintosh (President)
- Philip Farquharson (Vice President)
- James Brodie Macpherson of Cluny (Vice President)
- Iain Shaw of Tordarroch (Vice President)
- Richard McBain of McBain (Vice President)
- Grant Guthrie Davidson of Davidston (Vice President)
- Andrew MacThomas of Finegand (Vice President)
- The Very Reverend Allan MacLean of Dochgarroch (Vice President)

Of the remaining clans of the Chattan Confederation:

- Clan MacGillivray has a clan Commander but no claimant to the chiefship.
- Clan MacPhail's last reported chief died in Australia in the early 1900s. The clan has however started a process to select a Commander.
- Clan MacQueen's chiefly line moved to New Zealand and although descendants remain, there has been no claimant to the chiefship.

== Clan Profile ==
- The correct pronunciation of Chattan is Hattan. The "C" is silent. The "H" is slightly guttural.
- Pipe music: Gathering of Clan Chattan /Cruinneachadh Chloinn Chatain.

| Image | Notes |
|---|---|
| | Clan Chief's Coat of Arms: Left upper quadrant: A Rampant Lion used to denote the relation to ancient royalty.; Right upper quadrant: A bloody hand holding a heart is believed to be an allusion to the heart of Robert the Bruce and thus intended to express the clan's loyalty to him. The description of this quarter in the shield is officially given in the 1947 Matriculation with the wording: 2nd, argent, a dexter hand couped fessways holding a heart in pale Gules, a label Azure in chief charged with three 'bulls' heads cabossed of the first for difference (for Mackintosh). By comparison, the description of this quarter in the 1947 Matriculation of the Chief of Clan Mackintosh is 2nd, argent, a dexter hand couped fessways grasping a heart paleways gules – i.e. no label.; Left lower quadrant: A Boars Head | Depicts the clan connection to the House of Gordon through marriage, and; Right lower quadrant: An Azure (blue) Lymphad of pre-1947 may allude to the clan's connection with the Lord of the Isles.; At the centre, the Azure (blue) lymphad on a gold shield shown 'inescutcheon', along with a difference in the 2nd quarter of the main shield, distinguishes the arms as those of Mackintosh of Mackintosh-Torcastle, Chief of Clan Chattan, as opposed to those of Mackintosh of Mackintosh, Chief of Clan Mackintosh. |
| | * Crest badge: A cat salient, proper.: Clan's motto: "Touch not the cat bot a glove" or "Na bean don chat gun lamhainn" in Scottish Gaelic ("bot" meaning "without"). (The archaic spelling of 'catt', and the use of either 'but' or 'bot' are present in different sources in various combinations).; There is various thoughts as to the origin of the cat as this clan's crest: 1. As a play on words related Saint Catan. 2. As an ancient totem: The original clan residence, Tor Castle has a field adjacent called Dail a’ Chait i.e. ‘The field of the Cats’ where ‘Divination’ is said to have occurred. The correct designation is Tigh-ghairm nan Cat; i.e. ‘The House of Invocation of the Cats. |
| | Clan Chattan tartan. Individual Clans of Clan Chattan each have their own tartans. There is however also a specific Clan Chattan tartan, formerly known as Mackintosh Chief, recognised by The Lord Lyon in 1938. James Logan, author of the Scottish Gael states that the Chief of the Clan Mackintosh, Sir Aeneas Mackintosh of that Ilk, acknowledged this sett as the Clan tartan in 1816. ('The Scottish Gael' 1831). It was also included in the recording of Arms by George C McChlery, Public Register of Arms and Bearings 44/66 on 22 August 1960. |
| | Heraldic Standard of Clan Chattan. |
| | Clan plant badge: Red Whortleberry or Braoileag, Latin vaccinium vitis-idaea |

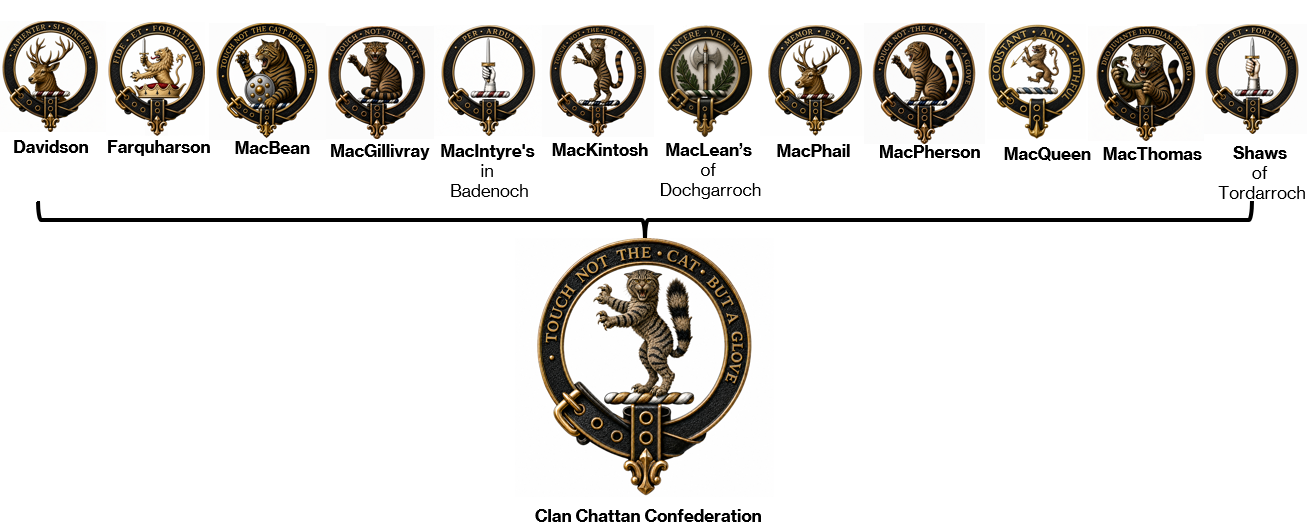
Clan crests of the entire Chattan Confederation

== In Folklore and Culture ==
- In a book of Scottish Songs, published in Edinburgh in 1791, there is a ballad entitled "Hardyknute" which contains the following:

"Syne he has gane far hynd attowre
Lord Chattan's land sae wyde
That Lord a worthy wight was ay
Quhen faes his courage seyd :
Of Pictish race by mother's syde,
Quhen Picts ruled Caledon,
Lord Chattan claim'd the princely maid,
Quhen he saift Pictish crown."

- The Burning of Auchindoon, a ballad about the vendetta between the Earl of Huntly and the Clan Mackintosh in 1592
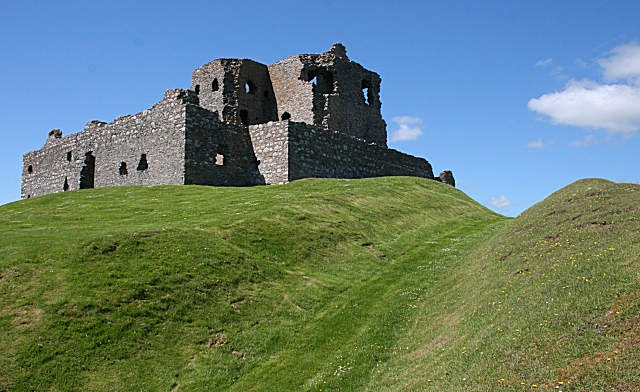
  Ruins of Auchindoun Castle

"I cam’ in by Fiddichside on a May morning
I spied Willie MacIntosh an hour before the dawning
Turn again, turn again, turn again, I bid ye
If ye burn Auchindoun, Huntly he will heid ye
Heid me or hang me, that shall never fear me
I’ll burn Auchindoun, tho’ the life leaves me"

- The poem "The Death of Gillies MacBain" is attributed to the wife of Major Gillies MacBain who fell at Culloden and was originally published in James Logan's 1831 work, The Gael

"Though thy cause was the cause of the injured and brave,
Though thy death was the hero’s and glorius thy grave,
With thy dead foes around thee, piled high on the plain,
My sad heart bleeds o’er thee, my Gillies MacBain!
How the horse and the horsemen thy single hand slew!
But what could the mightiest single arm do?
A hundred like thee might the battle regain;
But cold are thy hand and heart, Gillies MacBain!
With thy back to the wall and thy breast to the targe,
Full flashed thy claymore in the face of their charge;
The blood of their boldest that barren turf stain,
But alas! Thine is reddest there, Gillies MacBain!"

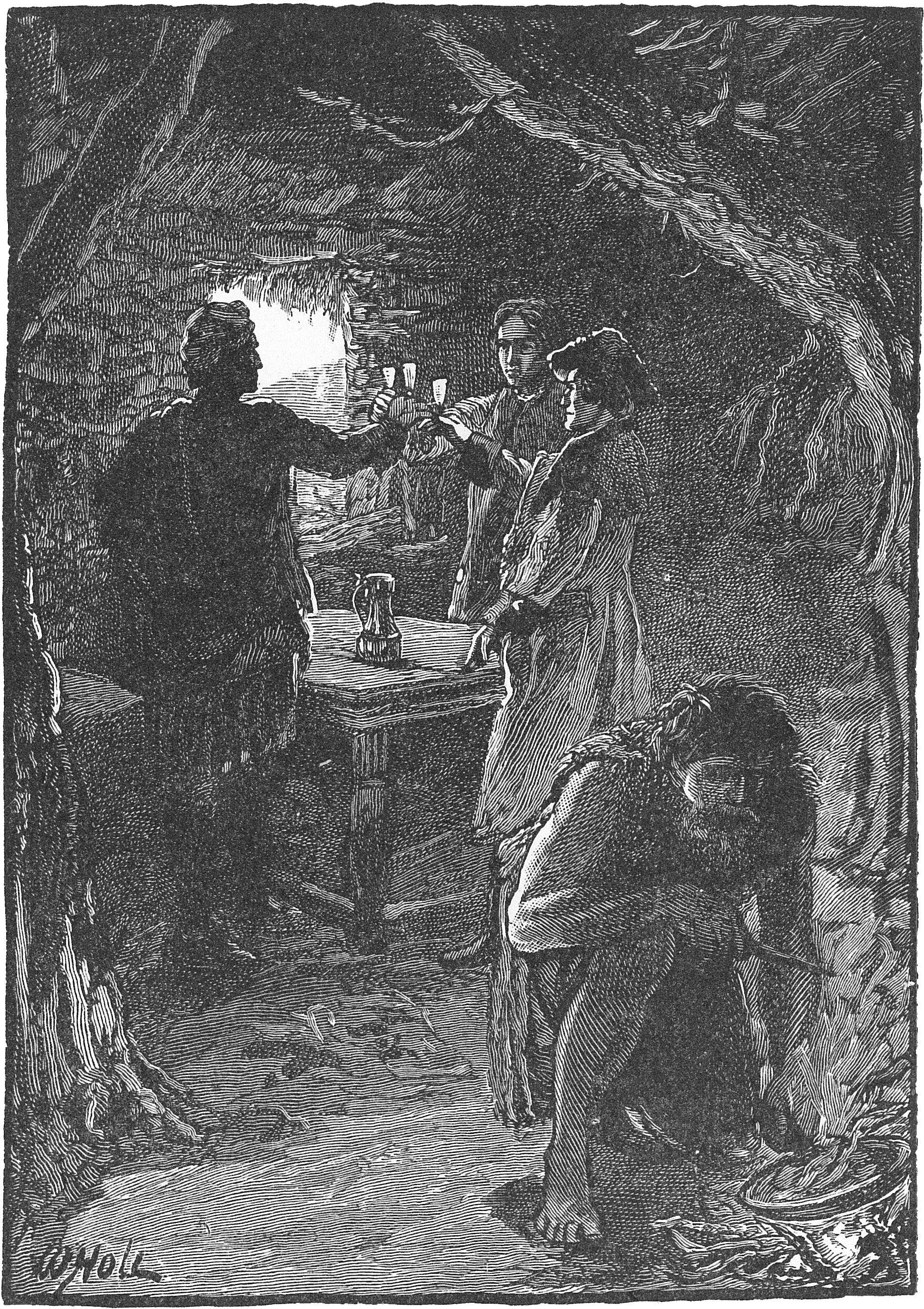
Image from first illustrated version of Kidnapped from 1895. A scene set in Cluny's Cage

- The Black Chanter, part of a set of pipes that allegedly fell from the heavens in battle and is in the custody of Clan Macpherson at Newtonmore.
- The Bod an Deamhain or Devil's Point a mountain in the Cairngorms. In the 17th century rumors were spread that girls of the Clan Chattan would hear a voice call their names in the middle of the night enticing them to climb the mountain and step off the edge.
- The Fair Maid of Perth is an 1828 novel by Sir Walter Scott, one of the Waverley novels. Inspired by the strange, but historically true, story of the Battle of the North Inch, it is set in Perth (known at the time as Saint John's Toun, i.e. John's Town) and other parts of Scotland around 1400.
- The ghost of a handless woman in a blood-drenched white dress said to haunt Castle Rait.
- The Farquharson's Hanging Tree, became the plant symbol of this clan.
- The grave of Seath Mòr Sgòr Fhiaclach, chief of Clan Shaw is said to have a spirit known as a Bordach an Duin which guards the grave.
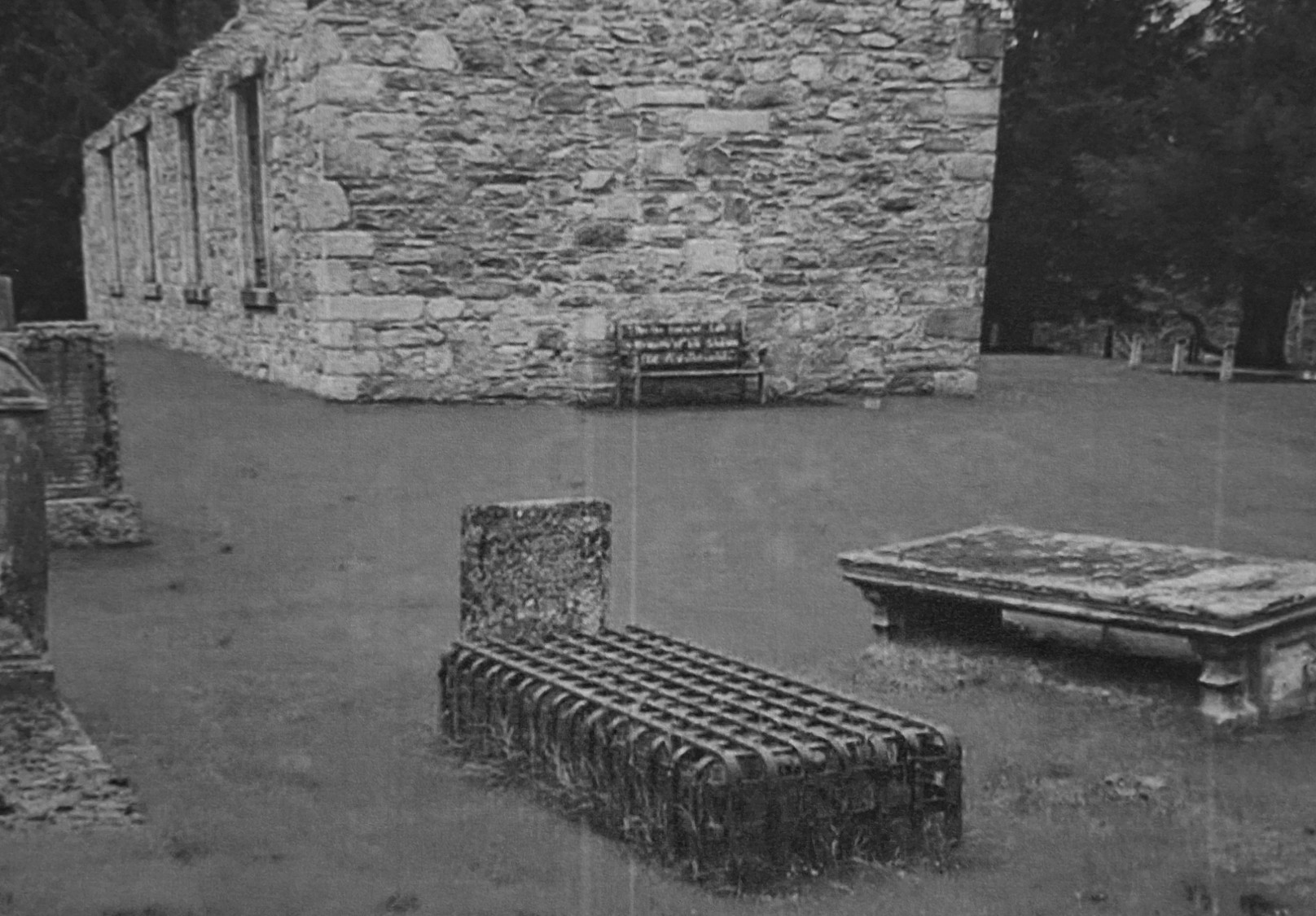
  Grave of Seath Mòr Sgòr Fhiaclach, Chief of Clan Shaw
- The 1886 novel Kidnapped by author Robert Louis Stevenson details the Macpherson chief Ewen MacPherson of Cluny in the aftermath of the 1745 Jacobite rebellion.
- "The Curse of Moy" is a poem by Mr. Morrit of Rokeby, included in Scott's Minstrels of the Scottish Border. During the period 1704 and 1833 no Mackintosh Chief left a son to follow him, a circumstance known as "The Curse of Moy," with the result that the leadership of the clan passed from kinsman to kinsman.
- The Green Lady of Newton Castle, a type of ghost specific to the highlands called a Glaistig.
- Macpherson's Rant, A "lament" said to have been composed by Jamie Macpherson on the eve of his execution.
- Painting, Battle of the Clans, 19th-century oil painting at the Perth Museum and Art Gallery created by an unknown artist, is dated to around 1850–1900 and depicts the Battle of the North Inch, a staged trial by combat that took place in Perth in 1396.
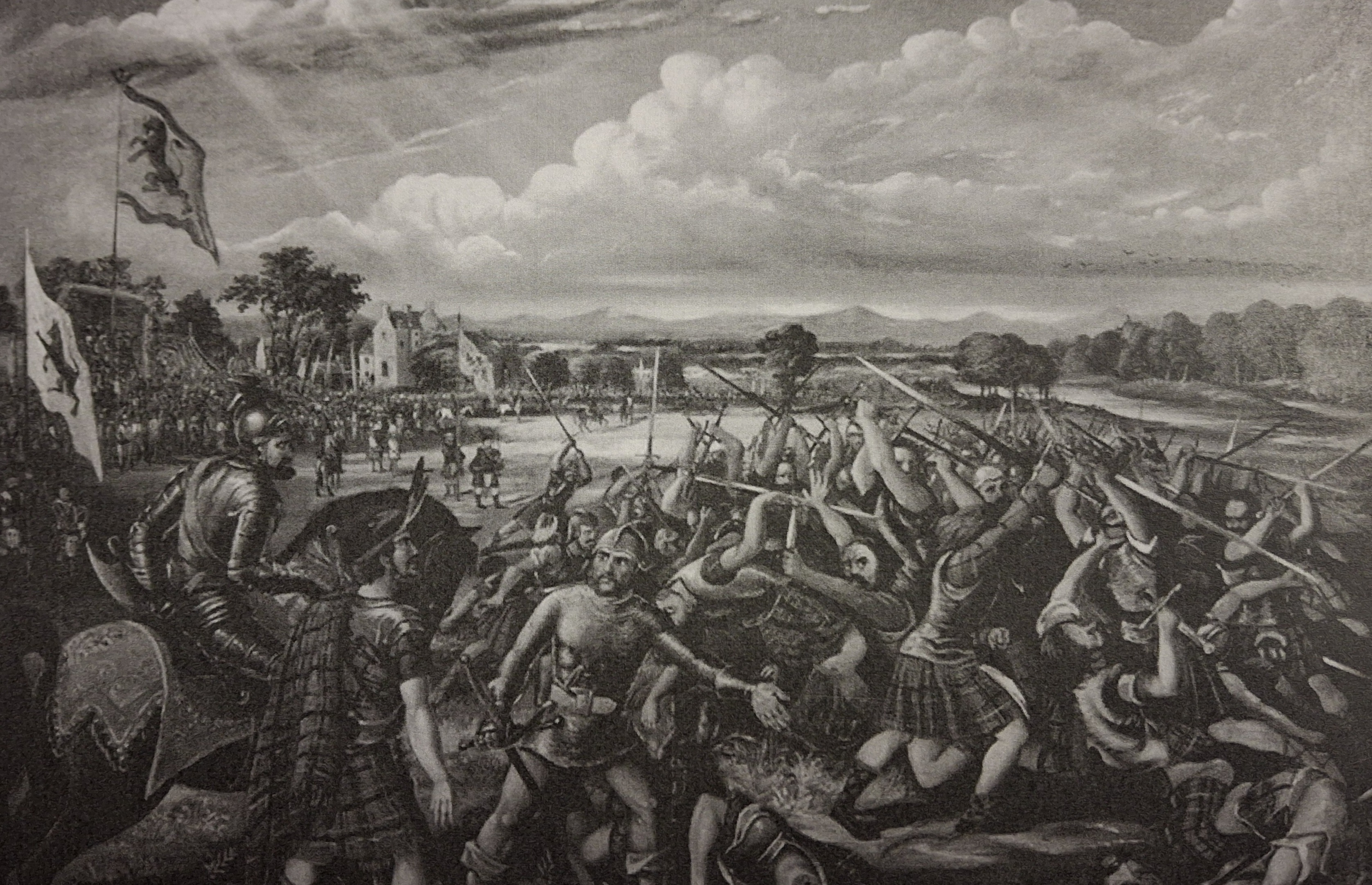
  Painting, Battle of the Clans, 19th-century oil painting, Unknown Artist
- The Mermaid of Corrivrekin: Poet John Leyden, compiled a poem "The mermaid", based on a gaelic traditional ballad, called MacPhail of Colonsay, and the Mermaid of Corrivrekin. The story states that a MacPhail was carried off by a mermaid, that they lived together in a grotto beneath the sea and had five children, but finally tired of her and escaped to land.

== People who have had a huge influence on the Chattan Confederation ==
- Alexander MacGillivray of Dunmaglass: Commanded the Clan Chattan at Falkirk Muir and Culloden. Known to be a fearsome warrior, standing some 6 ft 5 in tall.
- Anne Mackintosh: Leader in the Jacobite Rising of 1745 who mustered the Clan Chattan Regiment.
- Ewen MacPherson of Cluny: Leader in the Jacobite Rising of 1745.
- Henry Smith: Blacksmith who aided Clan Chattan at the Inches of Perth.
- Hector Mackintosh: Uncle of the infant chief in custody of the Earl of Moray, used the Clan Chattan to cause destruction throughout the region in an attempt to get his nephew released.
- Seath Mòr Sgòr Fhiaclach: Leader of Clan Chattan at the Inches of Perth.
- John Farquharson, also known as the Black Colonel.
- William Mackintosh of Benchar: Summoned the whole clan to meet at Termit in 1609 to rekindle the Bond of Union.
- William Mackintosh of Borlum: Leader in the Jacobite Rising of 1715.

== Castles and other structures associated with the Confederation ==
- Ardchattan Priory
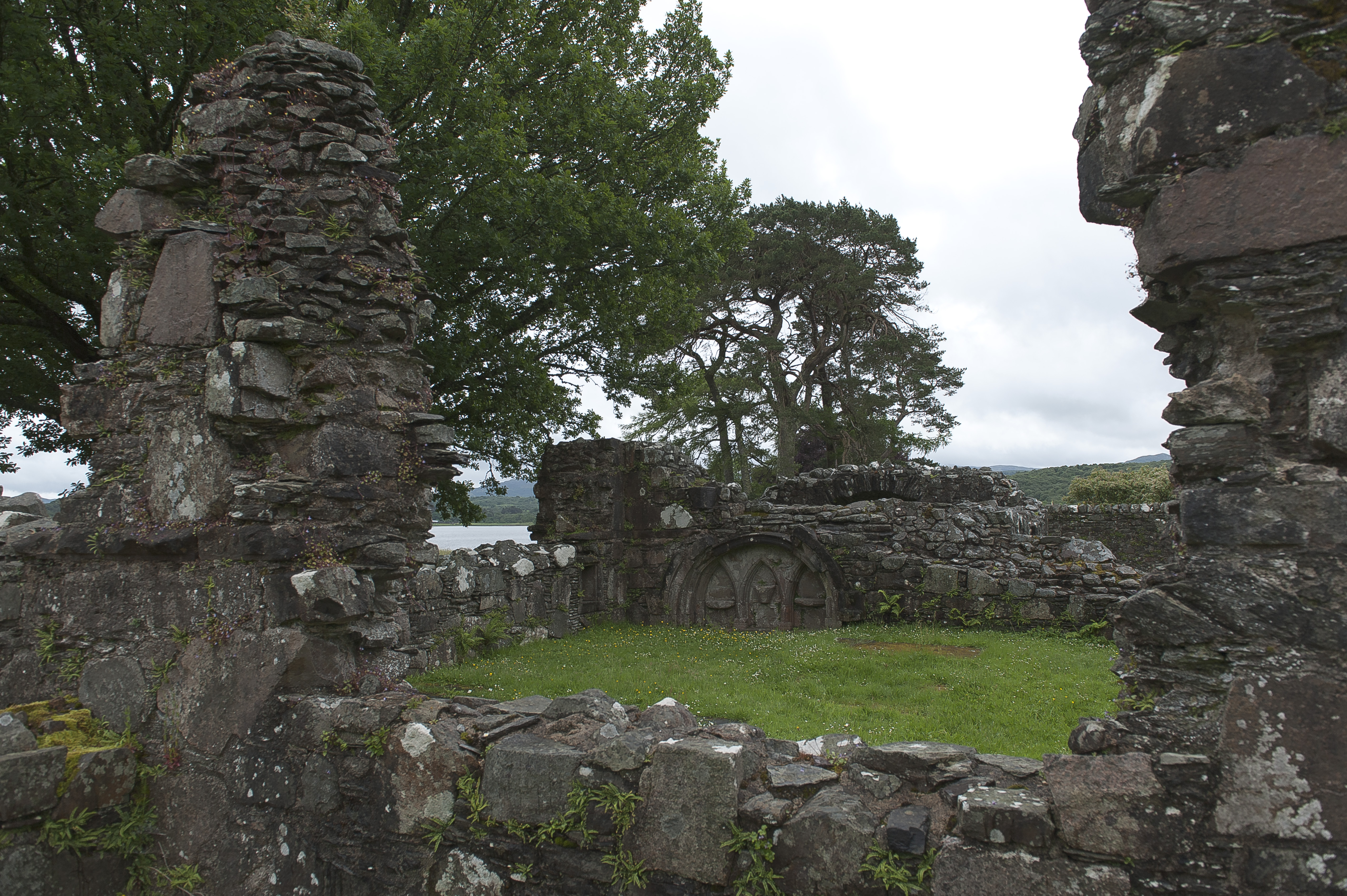
  Ruins of Ardchattan Priory
- An Sealbhanaich, 5 km west of Moy Hall, translated to the "place of the herding" historically understood that this high, isolated plateau was used to conceal large herds of black cattle from rival raiding parties.
- Auld Petty Church with Mackintosh Chiefs Mauseleum Vault, Inverness.
- Borlum Castle, held by the Mackintoshes and later replaced by a mansion, the castle was the seat of the Jacobite William Mackintosh of Borlum.
- Ben Alder, mountain in Clan Macpherson lands, where Cluny MacPherson hid out for nine years, in a hiding place called 'the Cage', before escaping to France. Prince Charles Edward Stuart briefly joined him there in early September 1746 whilst on the run after the failure of the Forty-Five.
- Braemar Castle, home of the Clan Farquharson chief.
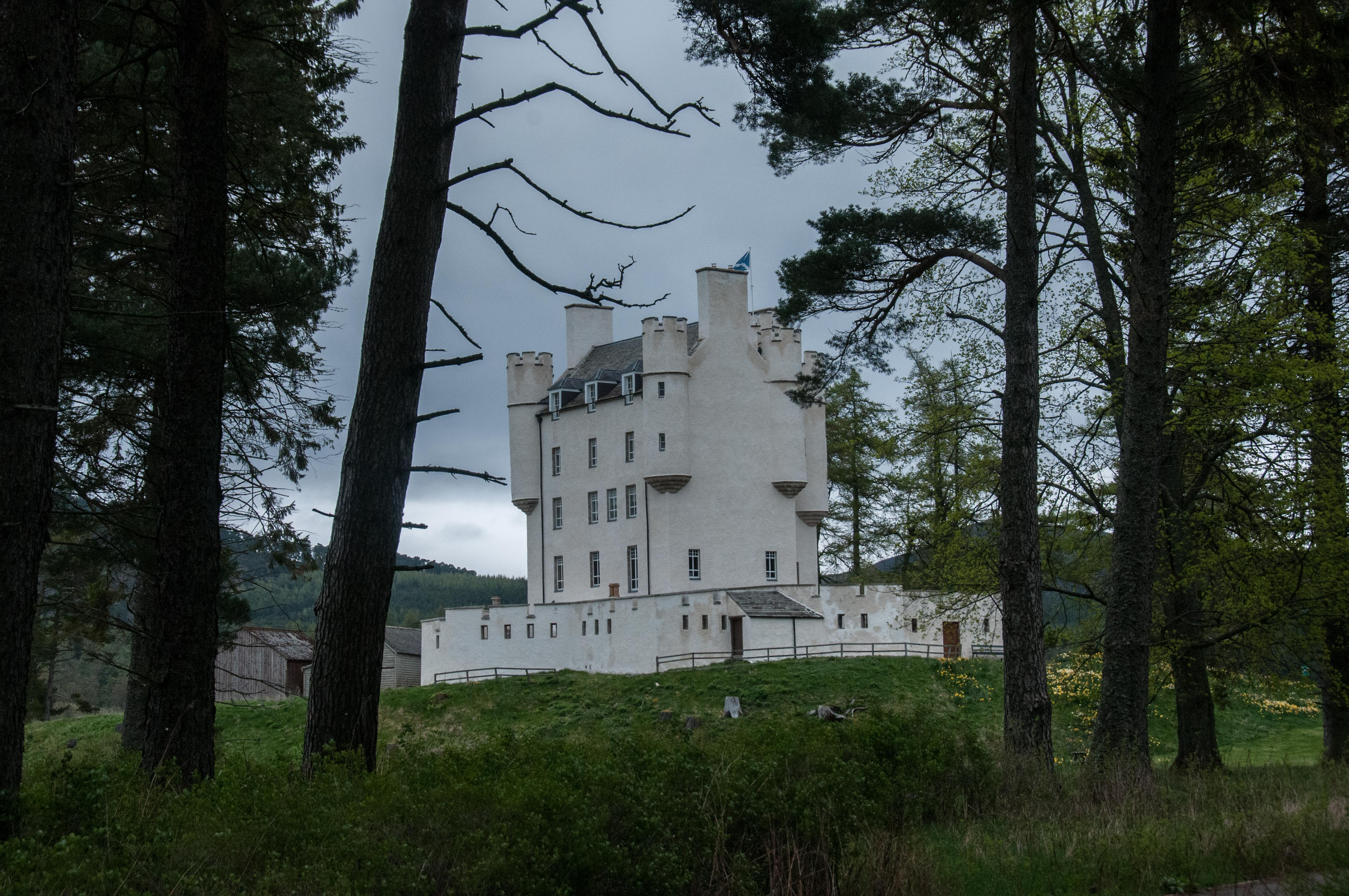
  Braemar Castle
- Cairn Park, Antigonish, Nova Scotia, a stone cairn was raised in 1983 to commemorate Clan Chattan and other various clan families who had settled in eastern Nova Scotia in the late 18th Century.
- Carn Na Croiche: (Cairn of the Gallows) near Dunmaglass where criminals were hung.
- Clach Chatail, near Melgarve where George Wade's Military Road enters the mountains. The stone is said to mark the grave of an Irishman called Cathelus, who ran off with Cluny MacPherson’s daughter and was murdered on this spot.
- Clachnaharry Monument, erected in 1821 by Mr R. Duff of Muirton, Column damaged in 1934 by bad weather.
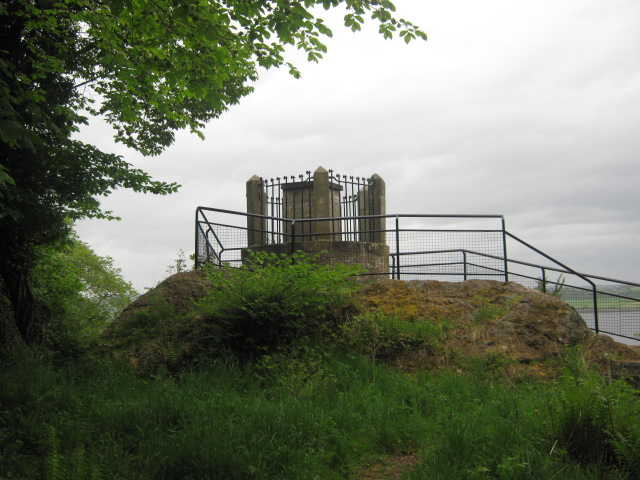
  Clachnaharry Monument
- ClanChattan Street, Belfast, a side-street off Limestone Road, gets its name from Sir Walter Scott's novel 'The Fair Maid of Perth' (1828)"That on the application of the owner of property (Mr John Thompson) two new streets near Alexandra Park- " be named Alexandra Road " and "Clanchattan Street.” (Improvement Committee, 16 July 1890).
- Clan Macpherson Memorial Cairn,
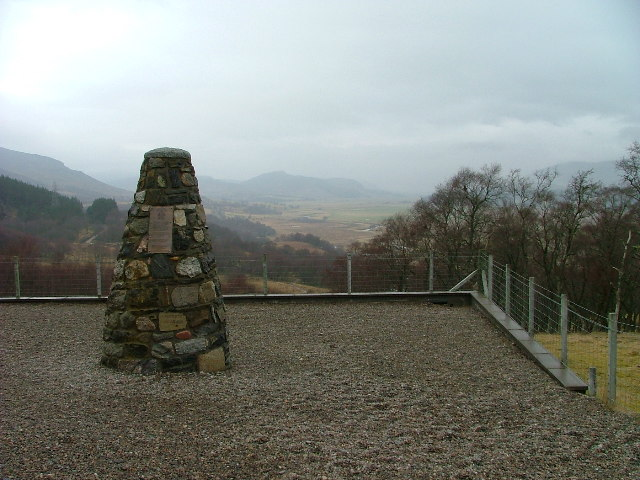
  Clan MacPherson Memorial Cairn
- Cluny Castle
- Dalrossie Church with numerous Davidson graves.
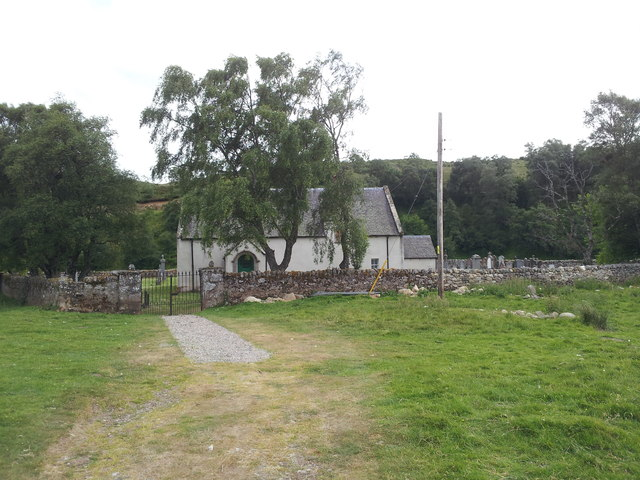
  Dalarossie Church
- Dalcross Castle, associated with Clan Mackintosh.
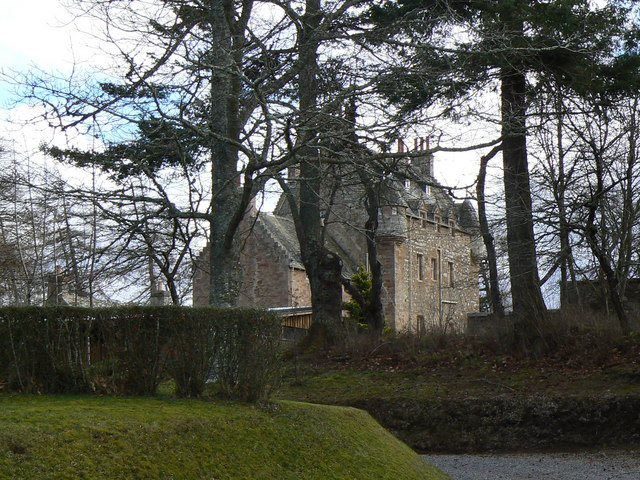
  Dalcross Castle
- Daviot Church, built by MacPhail and Macfarlane for the chief of Clan Mackintosh.
- Dalmunzie Castle, associated with Clan MacThomas
- Drimtaidhvrickhillichattan on the Isle of Mull translates to 'ridge of the house of the son of Gille Chatain', and is recognised as the longest place name in Scotland.
- Drover Roads and Mountain Passes into Chattan lands:
  - Corrieyairack Mountain Pass (Màm Choire Ghearraig): Linked Chattan lands to Fort Augustus occasionally needed to be protected from cattle reivers.
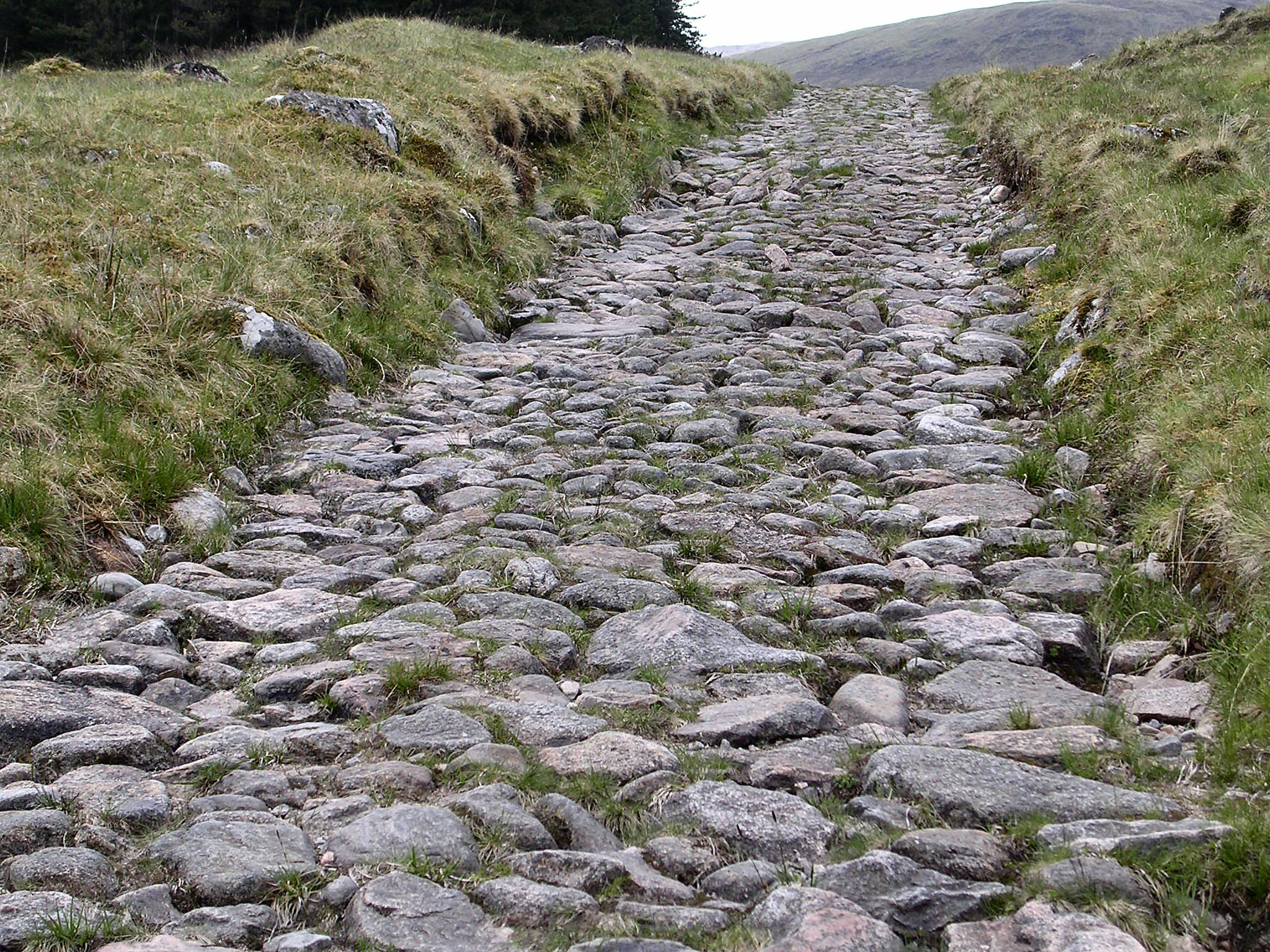
    Part of Corrieyairack Pass
  - Drumochter Mountain Pass, was the key entrance to Badenoch from the south, leading directly into the heart of Clan Chattan/Macpherson territory, occasionally needed to be protected from cattle reivers.
  - Lairig Ghru, mountain pass through the Cairngorms used by Clan Shaw to move their cattle to market.
  - Pass of Minigaig, cutting directly through the remote Cairngorm mountains, connecting Kingussie in Badenoch to Blair Atholl in Perthshire.
- Dunachton estate
- Dunlichty Church, graveyard of MacPhail, Shaw and MacGillivray chiefs.
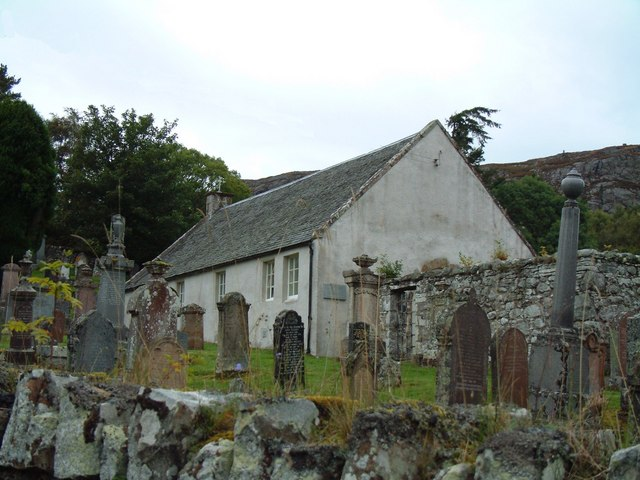
  Dunlichty Church
- Dunmaglas, about six miles east of Inverfarigaig in Inverness-shire, was held by the MacGillivrays from at least the sixteenth century, if not earlier. Dalcrombie, which is nearby, was also held by the clan.
- Ewen MacPherson of Cluny Exile Monument in Dunkirk, France.
- Finegand in Glenshee, a hamlet associated with the MacThomas.
- Forest of Gaick, famous story of the death of Captain John MacPherson in a avalanche whilst hunting stag.
- Invercauld Castle associated with Clan Farquharson
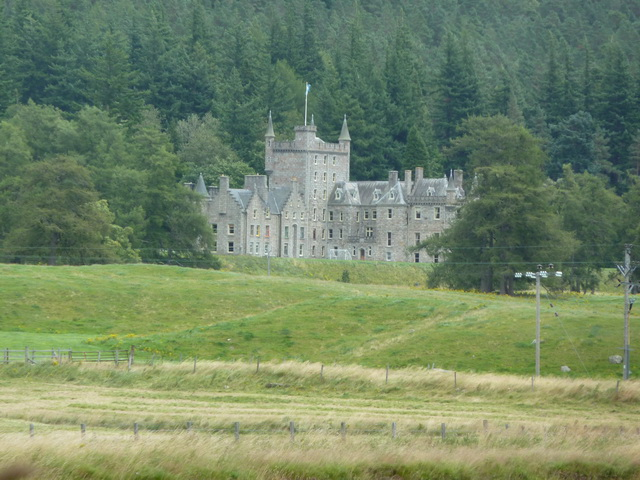
  Invercauld House
- Inverness Castle
- Inverness Old High Church, with numerous Chattan family gravestones.
- Kirkmichael church with several Davidson graves.
- Kinchyle, which is six miles south-west of Inverness, was the historic seat of the chiefs of Clan MacBean until it was sold in 1759.
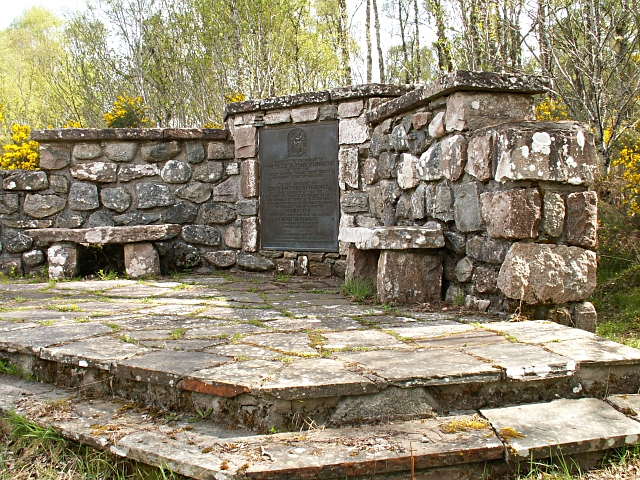
  Clan MacBean monument above Kinchyle near Dores
- Kinloch Laggan, hosting the Clan MacPherson Museum.
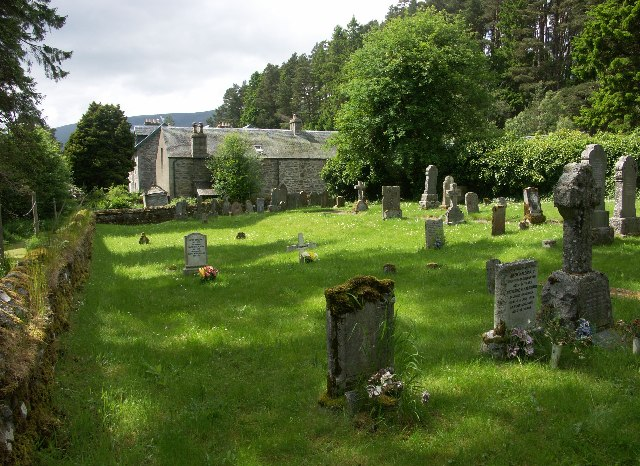
  St Kenneth's Church in Kinloch Laggan
- Loch Moy
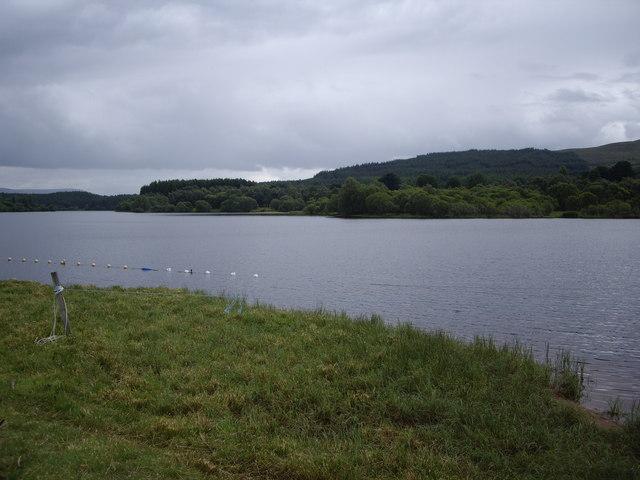
  Loch Moy
- MacBain Memorial Park, near the village of Dores close to Inverness.
- Moy Hall
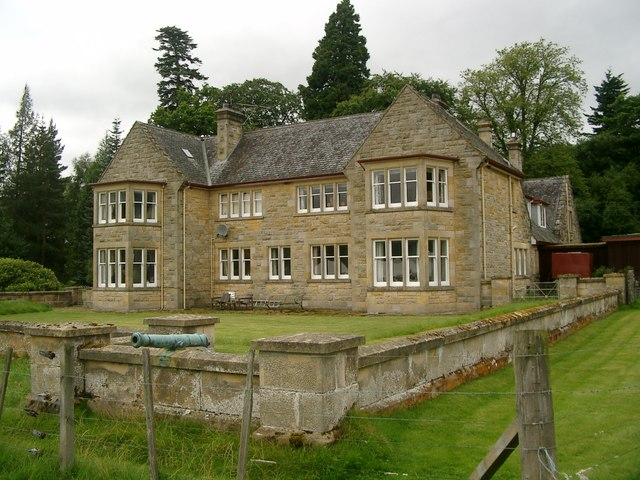
  Moy Hall
- Newton Castle
- North Inch, Perth
- Rait Castle
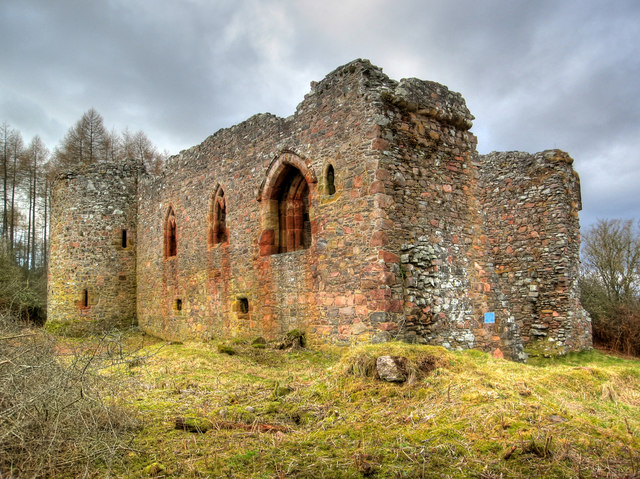
  Rait Castle
- Rothiemurchus Old Church, near Aviemore contains the grave of Seath Mòr Sgòr Fhiaclach, chief of Clan Shaw.
- Ruthven Barracks, a government military fort, built in Clan MacPherson lands after the 1715 Jacobite rising and used to enforce the Disarming Act of 1716.
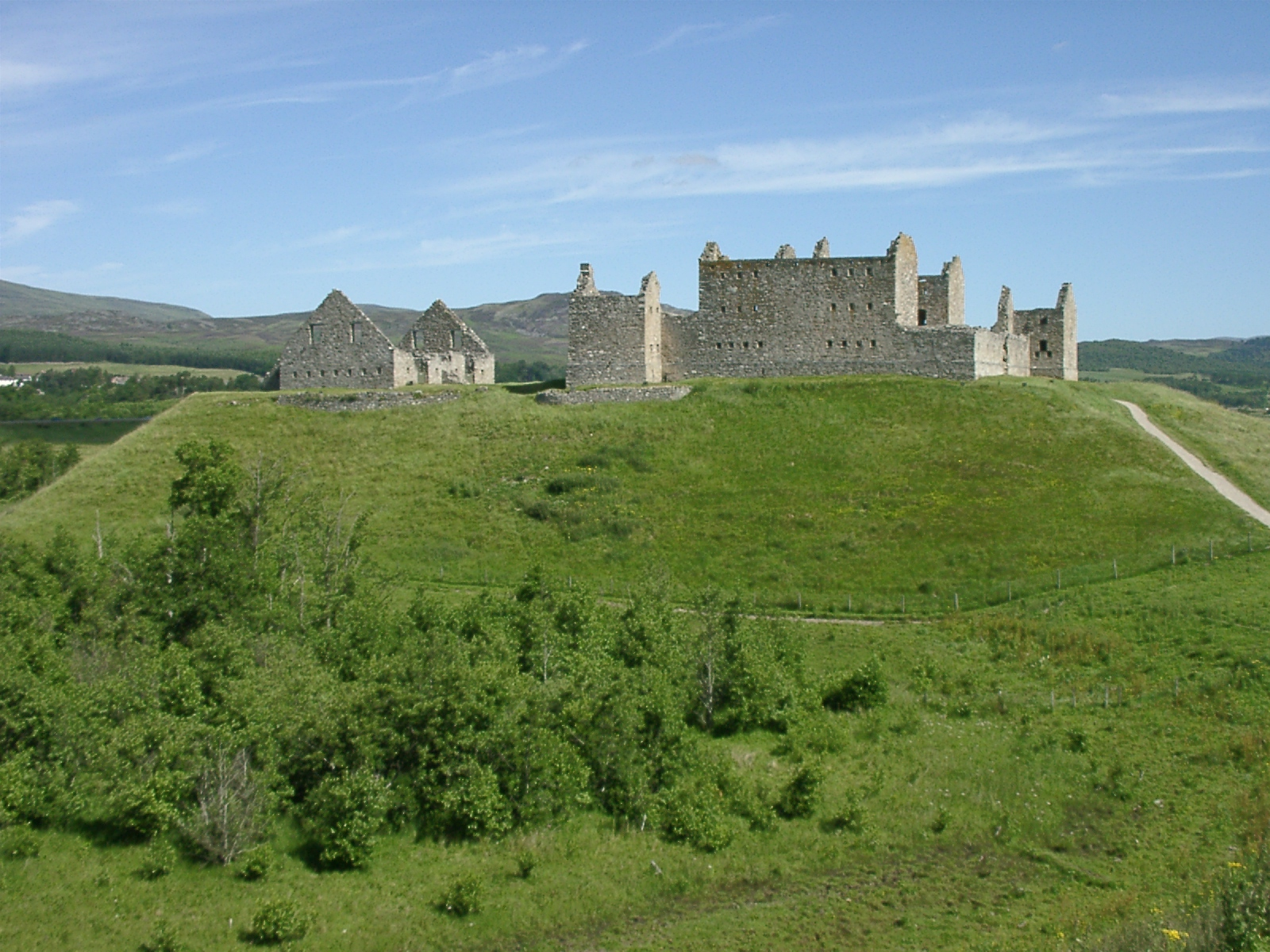
  Ruthen Barracks
- Shieling, numerous shieling huts or "airigh" in Gaelic are found on higher slopes throughout Chattan lands. Black cattle were taken to these higher pastures in the summer to let pastures lower down to recover. Found especially throughout the Badenoch area, and usually constructed as low stone covered structures.
- Spioradain Castle, a stronghold of the Macleans of the North, demolished with building of the Caledonian Canal.
- Torr Alvie, a prominent hill southwest of Aviemore, part of the Clan Shaw estate of Kinrara.
- Tor Castle
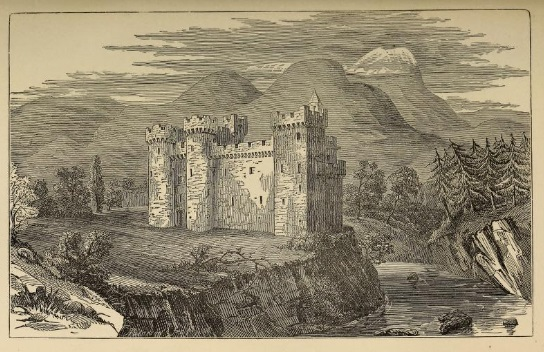
  Tor Castle
- Tordarroch in Strathnairn, associated with the Shaws.
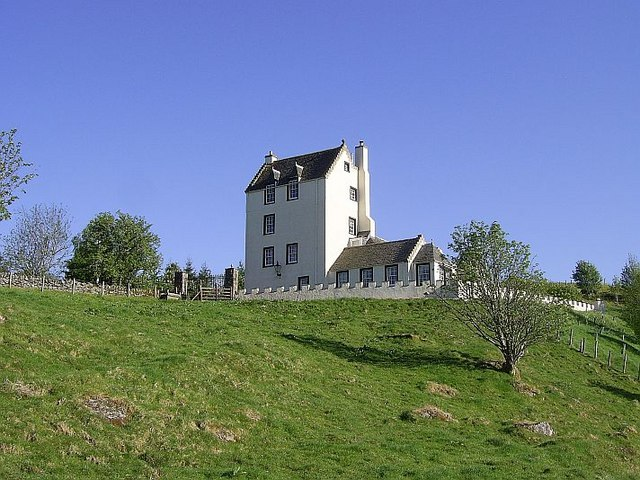
  Tordarroch House
- Tulloch Castle associated with Clan Davidson
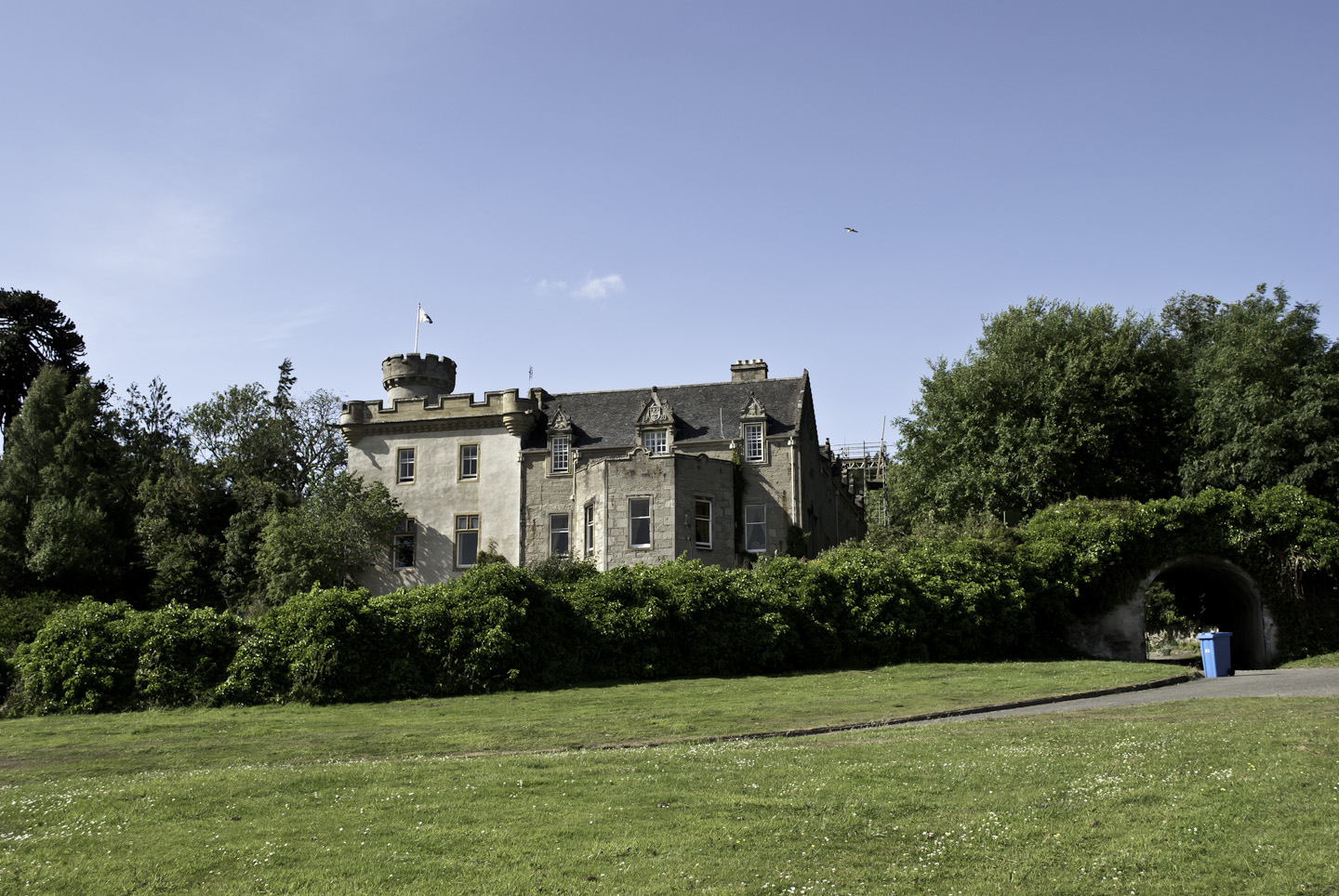
  Tulloch Castle

== See also ==
- Cateran
- Cat Sith
- Run rig
- Seven Men of Knoydart Post WW2 soldiers amongst them Duncan MacPhail and Jack MacHardy who attempted to claim smallholdings to house and feed their families, citing the Land Settlement Act, sparking intense national media coverage.
- St Catan
- Scottish wildcat
- Clan Line - a passenger and cargo shipping company which owned three ships named SS Clan Chattan.

== Published academic works ==
- Cathcart, Alison: Kinship and Clientage 1451 to 1609, Published by Brill Leiden, Boston 2006.
- Cathcart, Alison: Clan Chattan’s response to government policy in the Scottish Highlands c. 1580–1609, pages 163–184 a chapter from Fighting for Identity, Editors: Murdoch S and Mackillop A, Crisis of Identity? ISBN 978-90-04-47430-7 Publication: 26 Jul 2021.
- Farquharson, S, The Jacobite Rising of 1715: A Clan Farquharson Perspective, 74 pages, ISBN 978-069-246-0566.
- Fraser-Mackintosh, Charles; Dunachton Past and Present: Episodes in the History of the Mackintoshes, pub The Inverness Advertiser, Inverness, 1866.
- Fraser-Mackintosh, Charles; An Account of the Confederation of Clan Chattan: Its Kith and Kin, pub. J.Mackay, Glasgow, 1898.
- Gibson, John Graham; The Highlander, vol II, no. 143, (5 Feb. 1876), Letters from Carmichael concerning Mackintosh´s Lament, Old and New World Highland Bagpiping, pub. Birlinn Ltd., 2005.
- Mackintosh, Margaret; The Clan Mackintosh and the Clan Chattan, pub. W. and A.K. Johnston, Edinburgh and London, 1948.
- Mackenzie, Graeme; For Ever Unfortunate – The Original Clan Chattan", TGSI, Vol. LXI, 1999–2000; Inverness, 2003.
- Mackenzie, Graeme; "Gillicattan's Posteritie: MacMillans, MacPhersons, Mackintoshes & Camerons, and the great Lochaber feud"; Highland Roots, Inverness, 2009.
- Macpherson, Alan G; An Old Highland Parish Register, Survivals of Clanship and Social Change in Laggan, Inverness-shire, 1755–1854, The Journal of the School of Scottish Studies, University of Edinburgh, Part Two, 1967.
- Macpherson, Alan G; Day´s March to Ruin: The Badenoch Men in the ‘Forty-Five, pub. Clan Macpherson Association, 1996.
- Macpherson, Alan G; The loyal dissuasive and other papers concerning the affairs of Clan Chattan. Ed Scottish History Society, 1902.
- Macpherson, Alan G; The seanchaidhean, Historians of the Macpherson (Part 2). Journal of the Clan Association, 7(6), pgs 356–359, 1982.
- McGillivray, R. The Clan MacGillivray, University of Wisconsin-Madison, 146 pages, 2004.
- Murdoch Mackenzie of Ardross The origin of the haill tribes of the Clan Chattan, 1687.
- Paton, Henry; The Mackintosh Muniments 1442 to 1882 published in 1903.
- Stanley, Thomas: Loyal Clan Chattan The role of Clan Chattan during the Jacobite Risings, 1989.
- Taylor, David Vaughan, PHD Thesis, A society in transition, Badenoch, 1750–1800, University of the Highlands and Islands, 2015 details the post Culloden Battle era for Mackintosh and Macpherson families in the Badenoch area presenting an analysis of the social and economic transformation.
- Taylor, David Vaughan, Aspiring at Independence’: Protest, Petitions and Assertiveness in Badenoch c. 1730–1830, Edinburgh University Press, volume 16 issue 2.
- Taylor, Elizabeth, Braemar Highlands: Their tales, traditions and history, University of Guelph, ISBN 143-713-1816, 1879.
