= James Grant of Carron =

James Grant of Carron was an early 17th century member of the Clan Grant, a Scottish clan of the Scottish Highlands. He became famous in Highland history as an outlaw and freebooter after an internal feud within the Clan Grant.

== Early life ==
James Grant of Carron was the third son of John Grant of Carron and his wife who was a sister of Sir Thomas Gordon of Cluny. His father had made a bond with John Grant of Freuchie, the Laird of Grant and chief of Clan Grant, and had died by 1607. His paternal grandfather was John Roy Grant of Carron who in turn was a son of John Grant of Glen Moriston.

== Feud with Grant of Ballindalloch ==
=== Background ===
James Grant of Carron entered into a feud with a fellow clansman, Grant of Ballindalloch, because about seventy years earlier John Grant of Ballindalloch had been murdered by John Roy Grant of Carron, James's grandfather. This was apparently at the instigation of the Laird of Grant, chief of the Clan Grant, who had a grudge against his kinsman. The murdered John Grant of Ballindalloch was the great-grandfather of John Grant of Ballindalloch of the early 17th century.

=== The feud ===
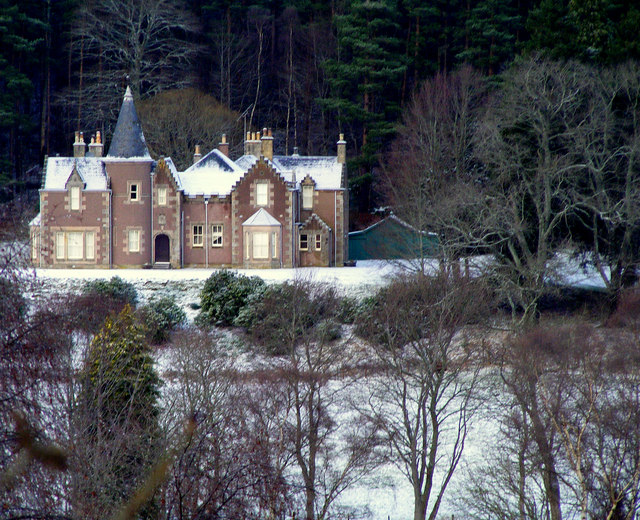
Carron House

During the feud, one of the Grants of Ballindalloch wounded Thomas Grant of the Carron family at a fair in Elgin in 1625. In retaliation, James Grant of Carron attacked and killed the Grant of the Ballindalloch family. At the insistence of Grant of Ballindalloch, James Grant of Carron had to stand trial but he did not appear and was therefore outlawed. The Laird of Grant tried to get both sides to reconcile and James Grant of Carron offered compensation and even to go into exile. However, nothing but blood-shed would satisfy Grant of Ballindalloch and so James Grant of Carron collected a band of broken men and became an independent freebooter in the Highlands. James Grant of Carron's career became similar to that of the outlaw Gilderoy. He killed men and laid waste to lands. However, Grant of Ballindalloch, having killed John Grant of Carron, the nephew of James, also had to flee, to North Scotland.

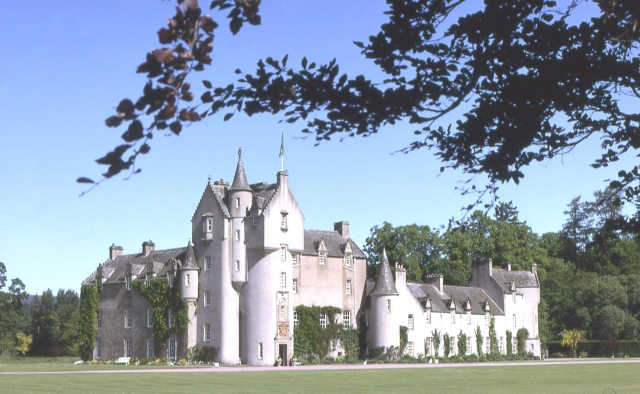
Ballindalloch Castle

The feud had continued when James Grant of Carron invaded the lands of James Grant of Dalnebo, a relation of Ballindalloch's, and killed him. James Stuart, 3rd Earl of Moray, having obtained his commission, the suppression of James Grant of Carron became his responsibility. He sent a force of men against James Grant but Grant escaped them. John Grant of Carron, along with Alex Grant and seven or eight others, cut down some trees in Abernethy Forest. Here they were attacked by Grant of Ballindalloch with sixteen followers and this was where John Grant of Carron, the nephew of James Grant was killed. Of Ballindalloch's men, Thomas Grant of Dalvey, Lauchlan Mackintosh of Rockinoyr, and some others were also killed. Alex Grant escaped and assisted James Grant of Carron to lay waste to Ballindalloch's lands.

=== Capture ===
In December 1630, a party from the Clan Chattan, led by William Mackintosh, 6th of Killachie, surprised James Grant at Auchnachayle in Strathdon and after several of Grant's men were killed and Grant himself was wounded, he was taken prisoner to Edinburgh Castle to stand trial.

=== Escape ===
According to Sir Robert Gordon, 1st Baronet who was contemporary to the time of this feud, Alex Grant and some other accomplices were able to escape. James Grant of Carron also escaped on the night of October 15, 1632, and fled to Ireland. He returned home and was pursued again by Grant of Ballindalloch who employed Patrick MacGregor. However, James Grant shot MacGregor and eventually captured Grant of Ballindalloch, holding him as a prisoner for twenty days in a kiln near Elgin. Ballindalloch escaped and several of James Grant's men were hanged in Edinburgh. James Grant went on to kill two other friends of Ballindalloch's who had received money to kill him. James Grant and his accomplices entered into the house of the common hangman, not knowing his profession, to ask for food. He recognized them and the house was surrounded. However, James Grant made a stout defence, killing three of the besiegers and escaped along with his brother, Robert Grant. However, his son, George Grant, and two other associates were captured, taken to Edinburgh and executed. This took place in 1636 and according to one account there is no further trace of James Grant of Carron.

However, according to historian William Fraser, in 1639, George Gordon, 2nd Marquess of Huntly granted a commission to James Grant of Carron to apprehend John Due Garre and his accomplices. James Grant also assisted the Marquess against the Covenanters.

== Family ==
As James Grant of Carron's illegitimate son, George, predeceased him, he was succeeded in the Carron estates by his younger brother, Robert Grant.

== Ballads ==
Francis James Child wrote a ballad about James Grant of Carron. Peter Buchan also wrote a ballad about him named The Gordons and the Grants which is as follows:

Away with you, away with you, James de Grant,
And, Douglas, ye'll be slain;
For Balnadallach's at your yetts,
Wi' money brave Highland man.

Balnadallach has no feud at me,
And I hae none at him;
Cast up my yetts baith braid and wide,
Let Balnadallach come in.

James de Grant has made a vant,
And leapt the castle wa';
But if he comes this way again,
He'll nae won sae well awa'.

Take him, take him, brave Gordons,
O take him, fine fellows, a';
If he wins but ae mile on the Highland hill,
He'll defy you Gordons, a'.
