= Mackintosh of Killachie =

Scottish noble family

The Mackintoshes of Killachie were a minor noble Scottish family and the senior cadet branch of the Clan Mackintosh, a Scottish clan of the Scottish Highlands. Their most famous member was James Mackintosh who was a Scottish jurist, Whig politician and historian.

== Alan Mackintosh, 1st of Killachie ==
Alan Mackintosh, 1st of Killachie was the third son of Malcolm Beg Mackintosh, 10th chief of Clan Mackintosh. He was succeeded by his eldest son, William.

== William Mor Mackintosh, 2nd of Killachie ==
William Mor Mackintosh, 2nd of Killachie, had two sons, John and Donald, who both appear in a band to Sir John Campbell of Cawdor dated 28 August 1534 and also in the 1543 band of the Clan Chattan. John supported Matthew Stewart, 4th Earl of Lennox against the Regent Arran and was with him at the Battle of Glasgow Muir in 1544. He died before his father who was therefore succeeded by his second son, Donald.

== Donald Mackintosh, 3rd of Killachie ==
Donald Mackintosh, 3rd of Killachie was tutor during the minority of Lachlan Mor Mackintosh, 16th of Mackintosh. He had one son, Angus, by Catherine, daughter of Hugh Rose, 9th of Kilravock Castle who succeeded him.

== Angus Mackintosh, 4th of Killachie ==
Angus Mackintosh, 4th of Killachie, was known as Angus MacWilliam or Williamson and ranked as one of the notables of Clan Chattan. He feud Aldourie on Loch Ness and occupied Termit in Petty. In 1581 he witnessed an agreement between Calder and Mackintosh (the chief) but was the only witness unable to write. He was an arbiter in a dispute between Calder and Kilravock over the boundaries of their estates. He was a witness to a band by Donald Gorme of Sleat to George Gordon, Earl of Huntly in 1585. His name also appears in the Clan Chattan's band of union in 1609. His education made no progress between 1581 and 1609 and he subscribed to the band "by a nottar". He died in 1624 leaving the sons Lachlan, John and Alexander. Alexander feud the lands of Holm, Inverness and was progenitor of the Mackintosh of Holm cadet branch.

== Lachlan Mackintosh, 5th of Killachie ==
Lachlan Mackintosh, 5th of Killachie obtained the lands of Dalmigavie from Calder. He appears in the Clan Chattan's band of union in 1609. He was also one of the leaders of the feud with James Stuart, 3rd Earl of Moray in 1624. His wife was a daughter of Barclay of Gartlie with whom he had one son.

== William Mackintosh, 6th of Killachie ==
William Mackintosh, 6th of Killachie was set the task of capturing Grant of Carron by Lord Moray in 1630. He acquired from Moray the feu of Killachie or Kyllochy in Strathdearn. He married Isabel, daughter of John Farquharson of Invercauld and had the following children: Donald, 7th of Killachie, John, to whom he assigned Dalmigavie, Alexander, who was the progenitor of the Mackintoshes of Farr, Kenneth, James, and five daughters. His name appears frequently in the Mackintosh of Kinrara manuscript between 1630 and 1699.

== Donald Mackintosh, 7th of Killachie ==
Donald Mackintosh, 7th of Killachie appears in an Act of Parliament dated 10 July 1678 where he is named as a Commissioner of Supply for Inverness-shire. His name appears in a list of "Heads and Branches of Families that are to give band to the Commissioners of Council" at Inverlochy, also in 1678. He appears with his son on the Valuation Roll of 1691 for the lands in Daviot, Dalarossie and Dores Parishes. He sold Aldourie to his son-in-law John Barbour, bailie of Inverness, but whose daughter later married Donald Mackintosh's grandson which in turn brought back Aldourie to the Mackintoshes. Donald had married a daughter of Dunbar of Grange and died in 1703 leaving one son, Angus, and three daughters. His second daughter, Anne, married Alexander Shaw, chief of the Clan Shaw of Tordarroch.

The Scottish Parliament passed the Act of Indemnity in 1660 which levied fines on people for past actions during the Scottish Civil Wars with a follow-up Act passed on 9 September 1662 in which the Mackintosh lairds of Killachie were fined £3,600 on lands worth £594.

== Angus Mackintosh, 8th of Killachie ==
Angus Mackintosh, 8th of Killachie was a Captain in Mackintosh's Jacobite battalion during the Jacobite rising of 1715 and he was captured at the Battle of Preston. He lived mostly at Ardersier and died in 1727. His eldest son, Lachlan, died unmarried and so he was succeeded by his second son, Alexander.

== Alexander Mackintosh, 9th of Killachie ==
Alexander Mackintosh, 9th of Killachie was a merchant in London. He married his cousin Elizabeth Barbour and had two sons, Angus and John.

== Angus Mackintosh, 10th of Killachie ==
Angus Mackintosh, 10th of Killachie was a lieutenant in Keith's Highlanders, serving in Germany in the Seven Years' War. He returned home ranked a Captain but had been badly wounded. When Frasers Highlanders were revived in 1776 for service in America he became a Senior Captain of the 2nd battalion and died in South Carolina unmarried. He was succeeded by his brother, John.

== John Mackintosh, 11th of Killachie ==
John Mackintosh, 11th of Killachie also served as a lieutenant in Keith's Highlanders in the Seven Years' War and was severely wounded at Fellinghausen in 1761. He joined the 68th Regiment in 1765 and remained in it for about twenty years serving through the Great Siege of Gibraltar. He married Marjory, daughter of Alexander Macgillivray. He was succeeded by his only son, James.

== James Mackintosh, 12th of Killachie ==
James Mackintosh, 12th of Killachie was born on 24 October 1765 at Aldourie. He became a distinguished lawyer and writer. He received an early education at the Academy of Fortrose from where he was sent to the University of Aberdeen. In 1784 he went to Edinburgh and studied medicine, obtaining a physician's diploma. However, his spare time was spent qualifying for the Bar and writing for the press. He moved to London in 1788 and in 1791 published his Vindicice Gallicoe which was a defence against Edmund Burke of the principles of the French Revolution. In 1799 he published Introductory Discourse on the law of Nature and Nations which met with brilliant success, among many other works.

He parted with his paternal estate of Killachie in 1801. He was married twice; firstly, in 1789 to Catherine Stuart who died in 1797, leaving three daughters, and secondly, in 1798 to Catherine, daughter of John Allen of Cresselly, Pembrokeshire, by who he had a son, Robert James Mackintosh, who was a Fellow of New College, Oxford and who edited his father's memoirs.

== See also ==
- Mackintosh of Borlum
