= William Mackintosh of Borlum =

Brigadier William Mackintosh of Borlum (1658–1743), often referred to simply as Mackintosh of Borlum, was a leader of the Jacobite rising of 1715.

== Ancestry ==
William Mackintosh, 4th of Borlum was the head the Mackintosh of Borlum cadet branch of the Clan Mackintosh, a Scottish clan of the Scottish Highlands. He was the son of William Mackintosh, 3rd of Borlum and Mary, daughter of Duncan the Baillie of Duncean. Their seat was at Borlum Castle which was near Inverness.

== Jacobite rising of 1715 ==
William Mackintosh, 4th of Borlum had achieved some distinction in French service. When the Jacobite rising of 1715 broke out in favour of James Francis Edward Stuart, the chief of the Clan Mackintosh along with Mackintosh of Borlum marched into the town of Inverness to proclaim King James. Mackintosh of Borlum intercepted post that granted a commission from the Government for Munro of Foulis to be made commandant of Inverness. The leader of the Jacobite rising was John Erskine, Earl of Mar who dispatched a force of 2500 men under the command of Brigadier Mackintosh of Borlum. They crossed the Firth of Forth in boats on 11 and 12 October 1715, but only about 1500 of them made it across, including the whole of the Mackintosh regiment. Mackintosh of Borlum came close to capturing Edinburgh but it was too well defended and so he instead took possession of Leith, where he entrenched himself in a fort that had been built by Oliver Cromwell. The Duke of Argyll who supported the Government made an approach on the fort but withdrew after seeing that an assault would be useless without cannons and that the occupants were defiant.

Brigadier Mackintosh of Borlum then moved to Seton House which was the seat of Lord Winton. While he was there he received orders on the 18th from Mar to march into England and join forces with Lord Kenmure and the English Jacobite, Thomas Forster. However, the Jacobite march into England was disastrous. Mackintosh of Borlum had been against the move, wanting instead to meet up with the Jacobite clans under General Gordon and this move would have at least secured Scotland for the Jacobites. Instead the Jacobite army, now under the command of Forster, was defeated at the Battle of Preston in Lancashire. During the battle the attack on Brigadier Mackintosh of Borlum's barrier had been repeatedly repulsed with heavy losses inflicted on the attackers. However, with the Jacobite defeat Brigadier Mackintosh of Borlum was taken prisoner and kept as a hostage. He was imprisoned in Newgate Prison in the City of London. On 14 April 1716, along with Forster he was attained for High treason and examined before a Commission. They pleaded not guilty and had three weeks to prepare for trial on 5 May 1716. Forster escaped from the prison at about 11 o'clock on 4 May and Mackintosh along with about fifteen others overpowered the guards and rushed out. Seven were recaptured in the maze of London but the rest, including Brigadier Mackintosh of Borlum, managed to escape. The Government offered a £1000 reward for his capture. John Prebble considers that Mackintosh of Borlum should really have led the rising instead of Mar.

== Jacobite rising of 1719 ==
Brigadier William Mackintosh, 4th of Borlum, escaped abroad and his father, the 3rd of Borlum, died the same year. He returned with a small force of 6,000 Scots and Spaniards during the Jacobite rising of 1719 who had landed on the Isle of Lewis under the command of William Murray, Marquess of Tullibardine but who were subsequently defeated at the Battle of Glen Shiel. Mackintosh of Borlum lingered for some time in Scotland without detection but was ultimately apprehended and imprisoned in Edinburgh Castle. He spent the rest of his life in prison. After being kept in captivity for nearly a quarter of a century he died on 7 January 1743, true to his Jacobite principals, aged 80. During his time in captivity he had published a "treatise on agriculture" and the year before he died, "a scheme for curbing depredation in the Highlands" - which was apparently being used with success thirty years later.

== Family ==
William Mackintosh, 4th of Borlum had married Mary Reade, and they had two sons Lachlan and Shaw who both emigrated to the Colony of Georgia with the Highland Rangers, a regiment in the British Army that was recruited by James Oglethorpe. Both Lachlan and Shaw fought in the War of Jenkins' Ear. He was succeeded by his eldest son.

== Tea ==
In 1729 he lamented that tea had taken place of beer and ale on the breakfast table.

"When I came to a friend's house of a morning I used to be asked if I had had my morning draft yet. I am now asked if I have had my tea. And in lieu of the big quaigh with strong ale and toast, and after a dram of good wholesome Scots spirits, there is now the tea-kettle put to the fire, the tea-table and silver and china equipage brought in, and marmalade and cream".

== Bagpipe music ==
There is a bagpipe tune called "Mackintosh of Borlum's Salute" that was written in honour of Brigadier William Mackintosh, 4th of Borlum.

== Ballads ==
Alluding to Mackintosh of Borlum's escape from Newgate Prison was the following London ballad:

Brave Derwentwater he is dead,
From his fair body they took his head;
But Mackintosh and his friends are fled,
And they'll set the hat on another head.

But whether they're gone beyond the sea,
Or if they abide in this countree,
Though our king would give ten thousand pounds,
Old Mackintosh will scorn be found.

Angus Mackintosh who was an editor of the Celtic Monthly also quotes a Scottish Gaelic ballad which relates to the death of Mackintosh of Borlum and which translates in English as:

Fare-thee-well thou gallant Borlum,
That the Stuarts never failed;
Ere thou reached the peaceful haven,
Rough the seas o'er which thou sailed.
