= Cattanach =

Cattanach (/ˈkætəˌnæx/) is a Scottish surname. It may refer to:

- Bruce Macintosh Cattanach (1932–2020), Scottish pioneer of mouse genetics research
- George Cattanach (1878–1954), Canadian lacrosse player
- Helen Cattanach (1920–1994), Scottish nurse
- John Cattanach (1863–1926), American baseball player
- John Cattanach (shinty) (1885–1915), Scottish shinty player
- Lachlan Cattanach Maclean, 11th Chief (1465–1523), Scottish clan chief
- Robert Cattanach (born 1984), Australian footballer

== See also ==
- Clan Macpherson, a Scottish clan, part of the larger Clan Chattan Confederation
- Cattanach v Melchior, an Australian court case
