= Broken men =

In Ireland and Scotland broken men were clansmen who no longer had any allegiance to their original clan, and might be outlaws.
