= Duncan Mackintosh, 31st Chattan =

- Born: 1 December 1884
- Died: 29 May 1966 (aged 81)
- Education: Bedford Modern School

Duncan Alexander Eliott Mackintosh of Mackintosh-Torcastle and Clan Chattan (1 December 1884 – 29 May 1966) was the 31st Chief of Clan Chattan, a confederation of Scottish Highland Clans. As a result of the 29th Chief's preferment of a more distant cousin and Arbell Mackintosh becoming the 30th Chief until her marriage to Anthony Warre (a name not belonging to Clan Chattan) it devolved on the 29th Chief's next heir in line, Duncan Alexander Eliott Mackintosh by the order of Lord Lyon King of Arms issued on 27 March 1947 who became 31st Chief and matriculated ‘as of right and without brisur or mark of cadency Ensigns armorial of and appropriate to Mackintosh of Mackintosh-Torcastle and Clan Chattan, marshalled as effeirs for the Inheritor of the Honourable the Clan Chattan… as Head of the ‘‘haill kin of Clan Chattan’’’. At this juncture the chieftainship of Mackintosh and Clan Chattan split.

== Life and circumstances of chieftainship ==
Mackintosh was born on 1 December 1884, the third son of Alexander Mackintosh of Daviot (1852–1902), an indigo planter in India, and Annie (née Berkeley). His eldest brother was the explorer Aeneas Mackintosh and both boys were educated in England at Bedford Modern School. After school, Duncan Mackintosh served in the Boer Wars (1900–1902) and the Rhodesia Mounted Police (1902–16), before taking up farming in Rhodesia.

Arms of the Chief of Clan Chattan

Mackintosh was the nearest heir of Alfred Donald Mackintosh of Mackintosh CBE, 29th Chief of the Clan Chattan who died on 14 November 1938. Alfred Mackintosh's estate in Inverness-shire covered 124,000 acres and King George V honoured Mackintosh with his personal friendship while also enjoying the estate's famous grouse moors. In his will, Alfred Donald Mackintosh CBE left his estate to a more distant cousin than Duncan Mackintosh, namely to Rear-Admiral Lachlan Donald Mackintosh CB DSO DSC. This led to a division in the Chattan Confederation.

By the order of Lord Lyon King of Arms on 27 March 1947, Duncan Alexander Eliott Mackintosh matriculated ‘as of right and without brisur or mark of cadency Ensigns armorial of and appropriate to Mackintosh of Mackintosh-Torcastle and Clan Chattan, marshalled as effeirs for the Inheritor of the Honourable the Clan Chattan… as Head of the ‘‘haill kin of Clan Chattan’’’. At this juncture, Rear-Admiral Lachlan Donald Mackintosh CB DSO DSC, he became chief of Clan Mackintosh, separate from but in and under Mackintosh of Mackintosh-Torcastle as Head of the haill kin of Clan Chattan. Clan Mackintosh remains the principal clan of the Clan Chattan confederation and the current and past Mackintosh of Mackintosh has been President of the Clan Chattan Association.

== Family life ==
On 8 September 1912 Mackintosh married Ellen Primrose Smith, daughter of Frederick Smith. Mackintosh died on 29 May 1966. He was survived by his wife, three sons, and two daughters.
