= Mackintosh of Borlum =

The Mackintoshes of Borlum were a cadet branch of the Clan Mackintosh, a Scottish clan of the Scottish Highlands. Their most famous member was Brigadier William Mackintosh, Laird of Borlum (1658–1743) usually known as Mackintosh of Borlum who was a leader of the Jacobite rising of 1715.

== William Mackintosh, 1st of Borlum ==
The Mackintosh of Borlum branch of Clan Mackintosh was founded by William Mackintosh, younger son of Lachlan Mor Mackintosh, 16th of Mackintosh (d.1606). William Mackintosh, 1st of Borlum married Beatrix, daughter of Innes of Innermarkie and had four sons: Lachlan, Robert, Angus and William. He died in 1630 aged 63.

== Lachlan Mackintosh, 2nd of Borlum ==
Lachlan Mackintosh, 2nd of Borlum was a loyalist during the wars of James Graham, 1st Marquess of Montrose and was consequently fined £666 by the Committee of Process and Moneys. He married Helen Gordon and the Gordon Marquess of Huntly subsequently gave him a sasine of the town and lands of Ballidmor and other dues on the payment of 6,000 merks. He had four sons: William, John of Lynvulig, Harrie and Alexander. The latter were twins who became bailies of Inverness.

== William Mackintosh, 3rd of Borlum ==
William Mackintosh, 3rd of Borlum purchased the feu right of the barony of Borlum from Sir Hew Campbell of Calder and wadsetted Benchar to Cluny Macpherson. He married Mary, daughter of Duncan the Baillie of Duncean and had five sons and two daughters: William, Lachlan, John (a Major of Mackintosh's Regiment in 1715), Duncan (a Captain in Mackintosh's Regiment of 1715), Joseph (who acquired Raigmore and by a daughter of Mackintosh of Aberarder was ancestor of the Mackintoshes of Raigmore and of William Mackintosh M.P for the Inverness Burghs), Lydia (wife of Sir Patrick Grant of Dalvey) and Janet (wife of Ludovic Gordon, brother of Sir Robert Gordon of Gordonston). William Mackintosh, 3rd of Borlum died in 1716 and was succeeded by his eldest son.

== William Mackintosh, 4th of Borlum ==
During the Jacobite rising of 1715 the leader of the Jacobites, the Earl of Mar, detached a small force of 2,000 Highlanders led by Brigadier William Mackintosh, 4th of Borlum from the main army. Mackintosh of Borlum moved into Fife and crossed the Firth of Forth in fishing boats. He briefly held Leith and came close to capturing Edinburgh. He linked up with some English and Lowland Jacobites at Kelso, Scottish Borders, then they marched south as far as Preston until they were captured at the Battle of Preston. He was charged with treason, but escaped from Newgate Prison with seven others the night before his trial was due to start. John Prebble considers that Mackintosh of Borlum should really have led the rising instead of Mar. He also fought for the Jacobites at the Battle of Glen Shiel in 1719.

William Mackintosh, 4th of Borlum married Mary Reade, and they had two sons Lachlan and Shaw who both emigrated to the Colony of Georgia with the Highland Rangers a regiment in the British Army recruited by James Oglethorpe. Both Lachlan and Shaw fought in the War of Jenkins' Ear. He was succeeded by his eldest son.

== Lachlan Mackintosh, 5th of Borlum ==
Lachlan Mackintosh, 5th of Borlum went to New England where he married a daughter of his great-uncle Harrie Mackintosh. He died there and was succeeded by his brother.

== Shaw Mackintosh, 6th of Borlum ==
Shaw Mackintosh sold Borlum to his cousin, William, son of John Mackintosh of Lynvulig and baillie of Inverness. He married Jean, daughter of Menzies of Woodend and left a son, Edward, and two daughters. Edward became lawless and was the leader of a band of robbers who infested the Great Highland road through Inverness-shire. A warrant was issued for his arrest and he fled the country, taking up service in the French army, after which there is no trace of him.

== Bagpipes ==
There is a bagpipe tune called "Mackintosh of Borlum's Salute".

== See also ==
- Mackintosh of Killachie
