= Slochd Crossing railway station =

Disused railway station in Duthil, Highland

Slochd Crossing

General information
- Location: Duthil, Inverness-shire; Scotland

Other information
- Status: Disused

History
- Original company: Highland Railway
- Pre-grouping: Highland Railway
- Post-grouping: London, Midland and Scottish Railway

Key dates
- 1922: Opened
- 1935: Closed

Slochd Crossing railway station served the railwaymen and families that worked or lived near the Slochd level crossing in Duthil, historically in Inverness-shire, Scotland, from 1922 to 1935 on the Inverness and Aviemore Direct Railway.

== History ==
The station was opened in 1922 by the Highland Railway. It did not appear in the timetable as it was privately used. It closed in 1935.

Preceding station	Historical railways	Following station
Tomatin; Line open, station closed	Highland Railway; Inverness and Aviemore Direct Railway	Carrbridge; Line and station open
