= A9 dualling project =

Infrastructure project in Scotland

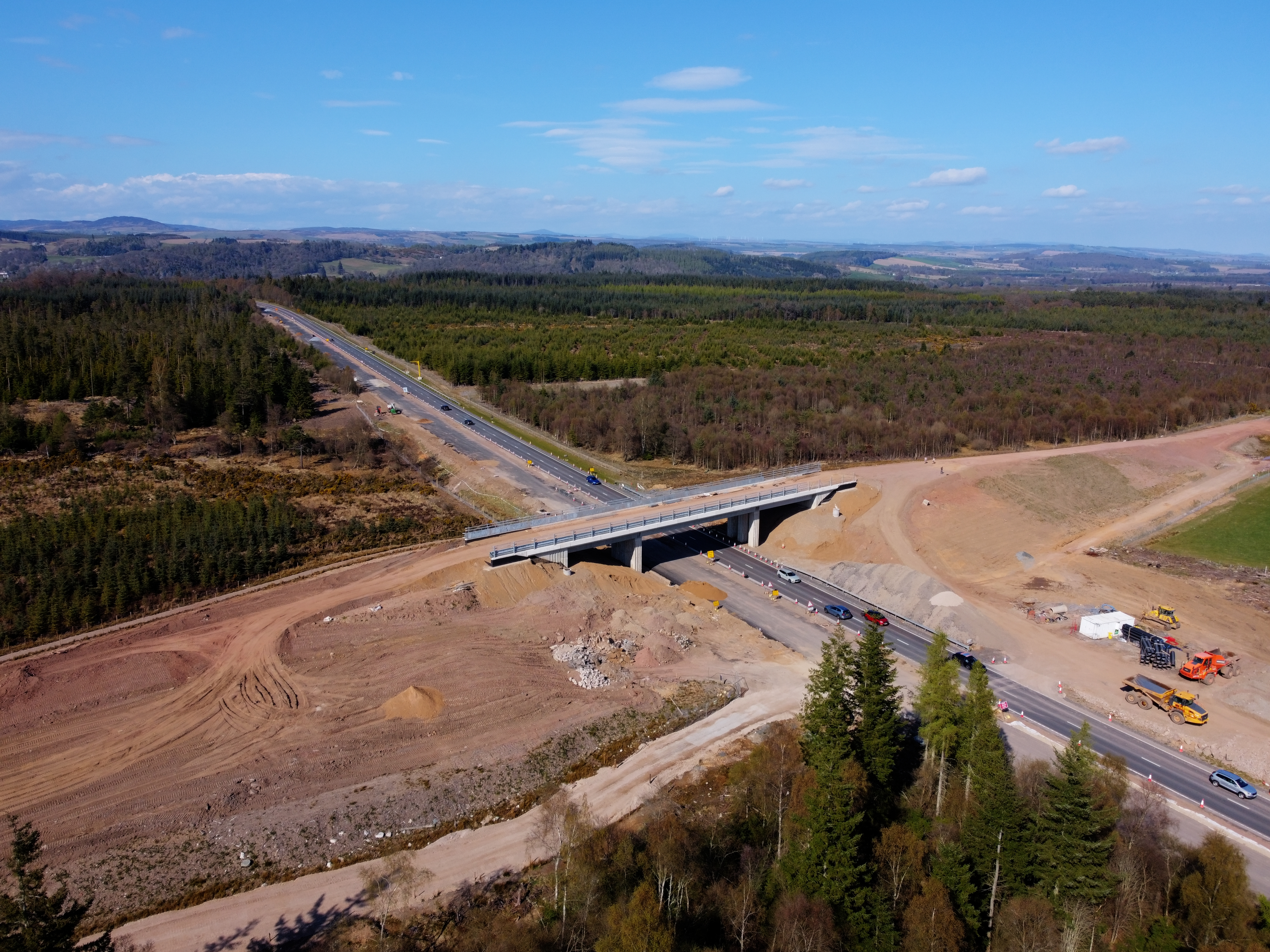
- Dualling work in 2021 between Luncarty and Pass of Birnam, the second section of the scheme.
- Location: Scotland (Perth to Inverness)
- Proposer: Transport Scotland
- Project website: Transport Scotland's programme
- Status: Under construction
- Type: Upgrade to dual carriageway
- Cost estimate: £3.7 billion (Note: up from £3 billion in 2015.)
- Start date: 2015
- Completion date: 2035

The A9 dualling project is an ongoing infrastructure project in Scotland to upgrade the A9 between Perth and Inverness from a single carriageway to a dual carriageway. A dual carriageway allows drivers to overtake safely, as they do not have to meet oncoming traffic; and the crash barriers on the central reservation greatly reduce the frequency of head-on collisions. As most of the A9 is currently a single carriageway, drivers may have to overtake heavy goods vehicles (HGVs) and other slow-moving vehicles as they are limited to 50 miles per hour (80 km/h), 10 miles per hour (16 km/h) lower than the speed limit for cars and motorcycles. The A9 has been dubbed Scotland's most dangerous road. In 2022, there were 17 fatalities, its highest level in 20 years before falling to four in 2023.

The project was announced in 2011 in response to the safety concerns with overtaking and head-on collisions. Construction started in 2015 starting with a 5-mile (8 km) section between Kincraig and Dalraddy (near Aviemore) followed by the 6-mile (10 km) Luncarty to Pass of Birnam in 2019. This project was originally due to finish in 2025, but has since been delayed to 2035. As of 2025, two out of eleven sections have been completed, totalling 11 miles (17 km), leaving 77 miles (124 km) to be upgraded. The sections between Tomatin and Moy, as well as between Tay Crossing and Ballinluig are under construction as of November 2025. Both sections are due to be finished in 2028.

== History ==
=== Early upgrades ===
The 110 mile (176 km) section of the A9 between Perth and Inverness was substantially rebuilt between 1972 and 1986. The rebuilt road follows essentially the same route as before except where it bypasses towns and villages instead of running through their centres. At the time of the rebuild, traffic levels were low enough to not warrant a dual carriageway, although provision was given should it be needed. Parts of the road were upgraded to dual carriageway where there are steep gradients or where traffic flows are expected to be high.

The most significant alteration of the A9 route was the realignment of the route north from Inverness, crossing the Moray Firth via the Kessock Bridge, cutting through the Black Isle and back across the Cromarty Firth. This shortened the route by 14 miles (23 km), bypassing Beauly, Muir of Ord and Dingwall. Construction of the Kessock Bridge began in 1976, and was completed in 1982.

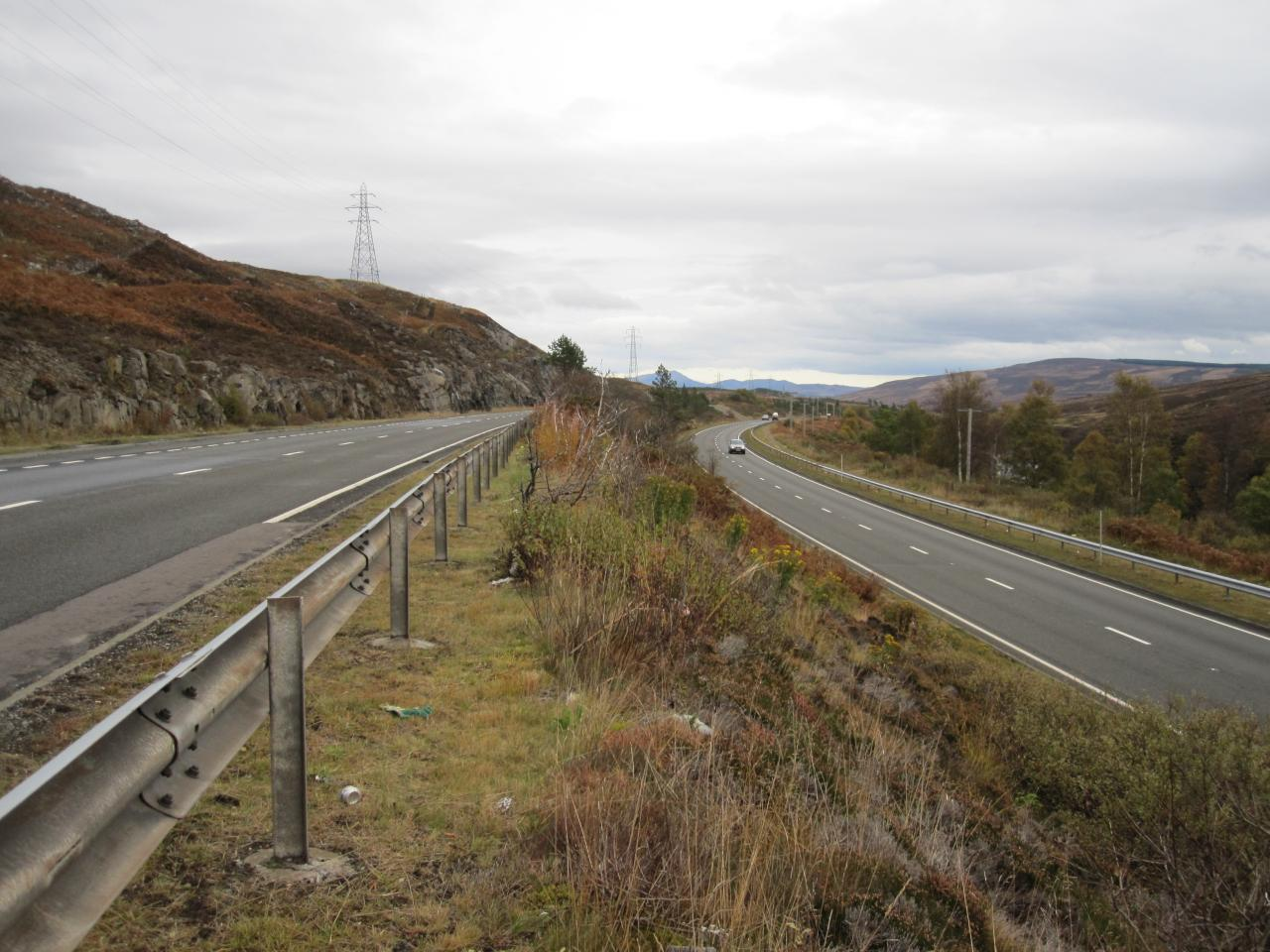
One of the sections of dual carriageway built in the late 1970s and early 1980s; this is the section in the north of Perthshire between Dalnacardoch and Dalnaspidal

Between Perth and Inverness, the road has been dubbed Killer A9, because of accidents and fatalities where dual-carriageway sections merge into a single carriageway; the principal cause is that motorists drive at excessive speeds to overtake lines of slower-moving vehicles before the dual carriageway ends. Dangerous overtaking manoeuvres on long single-carriageway stretches of the road are also common causes of accidents.

=== Early announcement ===
Since 2007, the Scottish Government has given serious consideration to converting the entire Perth–Inverness section to dual carriageway with more grade separated junctions, with the initial estimated cost at £600 million. In late 2008, the Scottish Government's transport plan for the next 20 years was announced. It brought forward planned improvements to the A9 to try to stimulate the economy and protect jobs. This included a commitment to full dualling of the road between Perth and Inverness. Work costing a total of £8.5 million was undertaken at Moy, Carrbridge and Bankfoot. Northbound overtaking lanes were created and the carriageway was reconstructed at both Moy and Carrbridge. Junction improvements were also made at Moy and at the Ballinluig junction, south of Pitlochry.

=== Speed cameras and speed limits ===
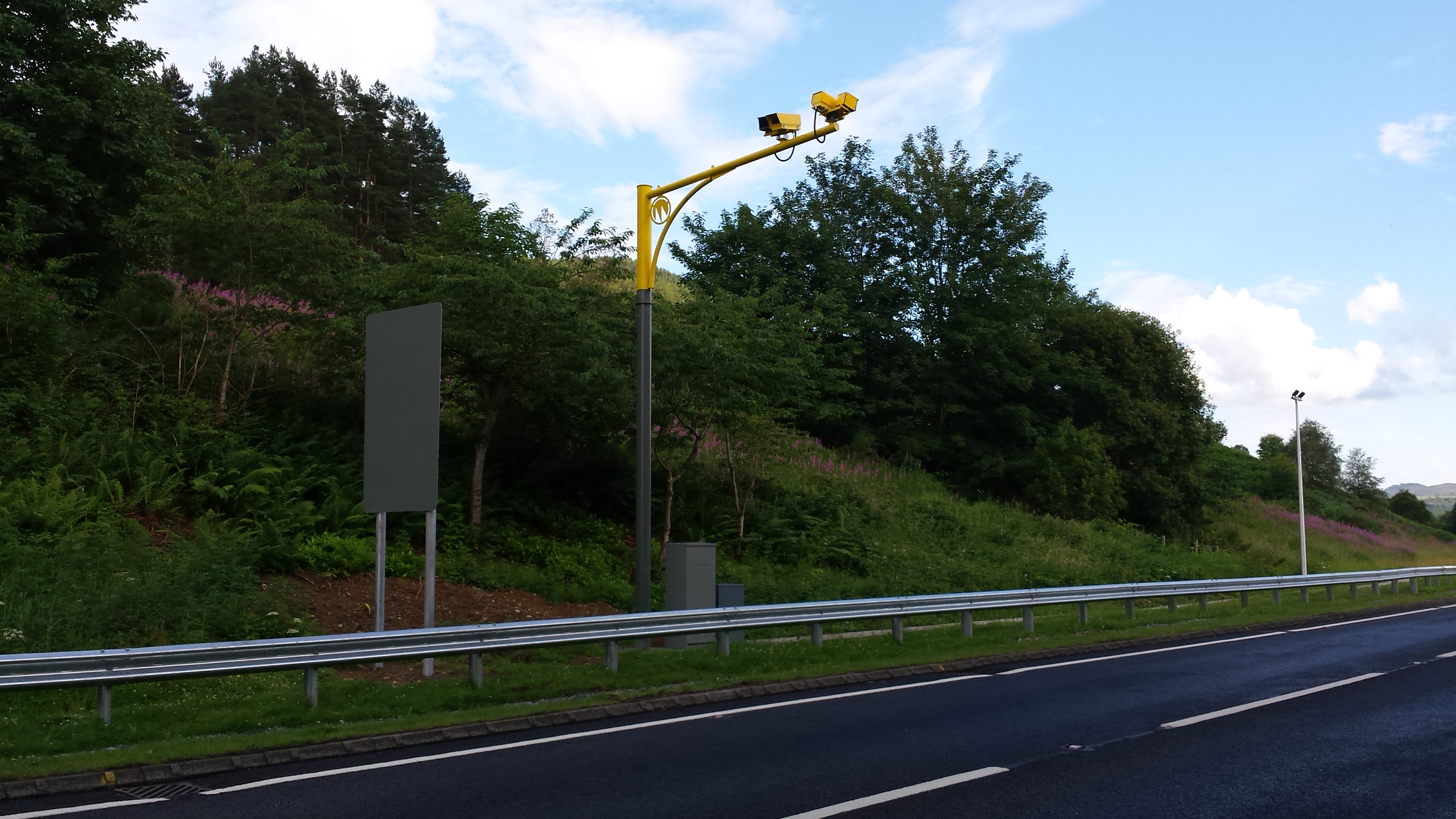
The average speed cameras which became operational on the A9 in October 2014, alongside the 50 mph HGV trial

In July 2013, the Scottish Government announced a plan to install average speed cameras on the A9 between Perth and Inverness. This was undertaken with an aim to reduce accidents and fatalities on the road, and was the second permanent average speed camera scheme in Scotland. Simultaneously, an increased speed limit for heavy goods vehicles (HGVs) from 40 mph (64 km/h) to 50 mph (80 km/h) was also announced to help mitigate driver frustration. Both became operational in October 2014. However, the 40 mph single carriageway speed limit remains on other single carriageways of Scotland. This was before the single carriageway speed limit for HGVs was increased in England and Wales from 40 to 50 mph in 2015. The HGV speed limit for dual carriageways in Scotland remains at 50 mph.

After the Scottish Government proposal to reduce the national speed limit on single carriageways from 60 to 50 mph was rejected, there are proposals to increase the HGV speed limits. This would put it in line with England and Wales, where the single carriageway speed limit will be raised from 40 to 50 mph, and the dual carriageway speed limit from 50 to 60 mph.

The A9 Safety Group claim that the speed cameras have had a "positive influence" on road users, with the number of drivers breaking the speed limit by over 10 mph (16 km/h) decreasing by 97%. Improvements to safety include at least a 40% reduction in fatalities, and this has been attributed, at least in part, to a reduction in speeding, from 1 in 3 vehicles to just 1 in 15. The average speed cameras may be removed after the A9 dualling project is complete. The increased HGV speed limit has led to improved driver behaviour and reduced road deaths and serious injuries by 31% as drivers are less likely to perform dangerous overtaking. It also improves fuel efficiency.

A9 speed limit Perth–Inverness (mph)	SC	DC
Cars/motorcycles	60	70
Cars towing trailers	50	60
HGVs (Note: defined as a vehicle weighing over 7.5 tonnes gross vehicle weight (GVW))	50 (Note: a 40 mph speed limit for HGV applies to other single carriageway roads in Scotland (including the single carriageway sections of the A9 outside of Perth to Inverness) when the national speed limit sign is displayed. However, there are plans to increase this to 50 mph nationwide, as this was implemented in England and Wales in 2015)	50
Buses/coaches (Note: defined as a vehicle with more than eight passenger seats)	50	50

== Road safety statistics ==
The A9 has been dubbed the most dangerous road in Scotland. In 2022, despite the installation of average speed cameras, 17 people died on the A9, of whom 13 were on the stretch between Perth and Inverness, where much of the route is single carriageway. It also included the deaths of three Americans visiting Scotland in August 2022, where the crash happened in the Highlands. This was the highest number of fatalities in a one-year period over the past 20 years. However, other recent years had few fatalities; there was one death per year between 2019 and 2021, and four deaths in 2023. Between 2010 and 2022, there were a total of 72 fatalities on the A9 between Perth and Inverness, working out at an average of 5.5 deaths per year. The "A9 Dual Action Group" was established to bring attention to the statistics. It submitted a petition to the Scottish Parliament in December 2022, calling on the Scottish Government to follow through on its 2011 commitment to convert the remaining 77 miles (124 kilometres) of single carriageway into dual carriageway by 2025. In 2023, the Scottish National Party (SNP) stated that the dualling of the road would not be complete by 2025.

The annual average daily traffic (AADT) of the A9 varies between Perth and Inverness from 8,500 around Pitlochry, 22,500 around Perth and 37,000 around Inverness.

== Construction ==
=== Announcement ===
In November 2011, the Scottish Government announced that it would upgrade the entire road between Perth and Inverness to a dual carriageway by 2025. The design contract was split into three lots with Lot 1 (Glengarry to Dalraddy) awarded to a CH2M / Fairhurst joint venture in April 2014. Lot 2 (Pass of Birnam to Glengarry) was awarded to Jacobs in August 2014 and Lot 3 was awarded to an Atkins / Mouchel joint venture in December 2014. The contract for a preliminary section (outwith Lots 1 to 3) of the £3 billion project was awarded in June 2015. Then transport minister Keith Brown stated that the A9 dualling project would be "the biggest transport project in Scotland's history". Preliminary work started in 2014 in preparation of main construction work.

=== Completed sections ===
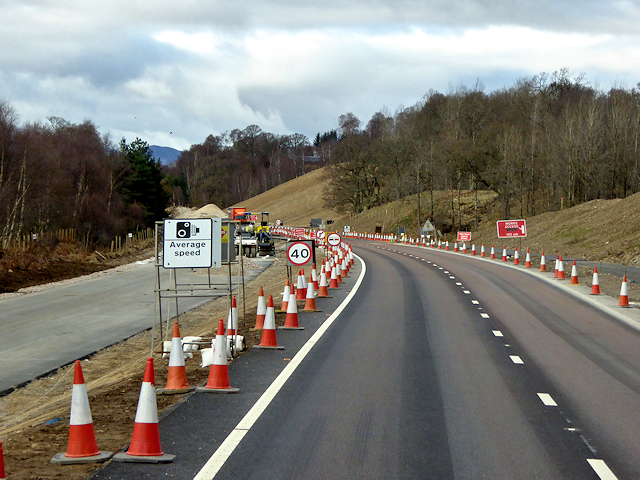
Construction works for the first newly completed dual section of the A9 near Alvie

Work began on the first 5-mile (8 km) section between Kincraig and Dalraddy (located just south of Aviemore) in September 2015. The first section was scheduled to open in the summer of 2017, but due to technical problems, this section suffered a slight delay and completed in September 2017 at a cost of £35 million. It is an isolated stretch of dual carriageway (i.e., this section is not an extension of an existing dual carriageway or something that fills the gap, as was done for the second and third section down below). Since Kincraig to Dalraddy was upgraded, a 2+1 road section (also known as WS2+1) was removed due to CD 109 requirements of the Design Manual for Roads and Bridges (DMRB) requiring a minimum of a 2 km section of single carriageway between the dual carriageway and the WS2+1 section.

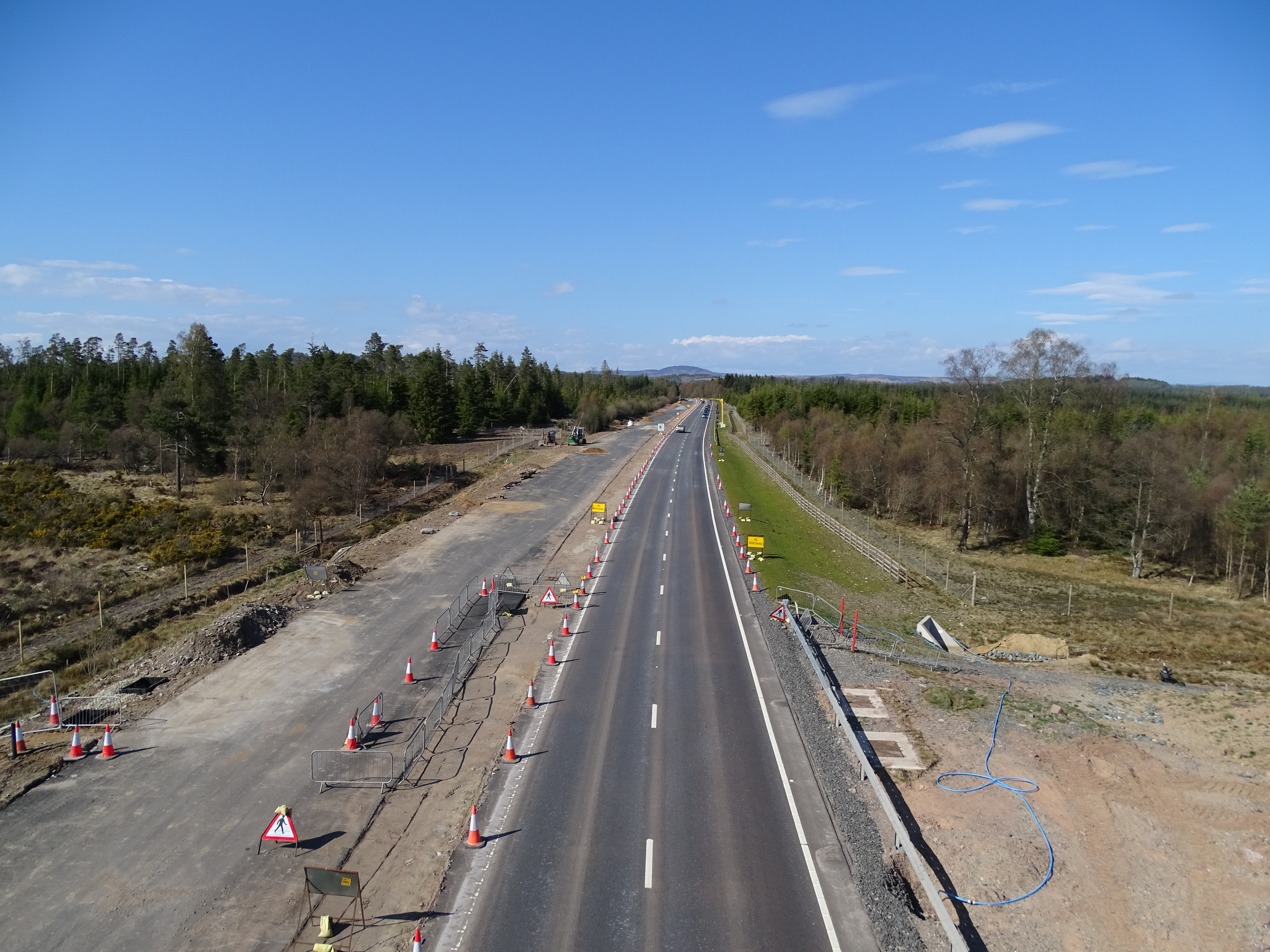
Construction work for the second section of the scheme between Luncarty and Pass of Birnam, taken in 2021

The second section of the project was the 6-mile (10 km) section between Luncarty and Pass of Birnam, the first section of what was single carriageway north of Perth. After the £96 million contract was awarded to Balfour Beatty in August 2018, construction works began in February 2019. Between September 2017 and February 2019 there were no works in relation with the dualling programme. This section was scheduled to finish in early 2021. Like the Kincraig to Dalraddy section, it experienced a slight delay meaning that this section was finished in August 2021 with off-carriageway works to finish by 2022. After the completion of the first two sections, 11 miles (18 km) of single carriageway had been converted to dual carriageway.

=== Proposed and under construction sections ===
Between August 2021 and October 2024, no sections of the A9 were upgraded or under construction. The project will be delivered via a hybrid approach, utilising both 'design and build' (D&B) and 'mutual investment model' (MIM), a type of public-private partnership, contracts.

The third section to be upgraded is between Tomatin and Moy, also 6 miles long. This is the northernmost section of single carriageway for the scheme. In November 2023, Transport Minister Fiona Hyslop announced three contractors had been shortlisted for this scheme: John Graham Construction Ltd, Sacyr UK Ltd and Balfour Beatty Civil Engineering Ltd. The £150 million contract was awarded to Balfour Beatty in July 2024. Some preparation works to this section include trees being cut down and a new railway bridge on the Highland Main Line, which were done in 2021 and 2022, ahead of the main construction work. The new railway bridge is also wide enough should the Highland Main Line be doubled in the future. It was initially projected that this section would be upgraded by the end of 2027. Delays due to Belfour Beatty needing to assess the "impact of weather and environmental restrictions around working in rivers and streams" have pushed the completion date to early 2028. Preparatory works on this section began in October 2024, and major construction started in May 2025. The section's cost rose to £308 million from £254 million in July 2024 and before that, £197 million.

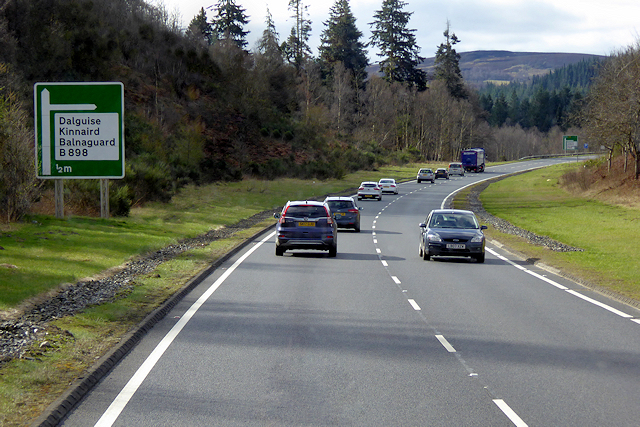
The A9 single carriageway (pictured) north of the Jubilee Bridge is scheduled for dualling in 2025

In April 2024, Transport Scotland began procurement for the 5-mile (8 km) section between Tay Crossing (also known as the Jubilee Bridge) and Ballinluig. This involved publishing a prior information notice for a £155 million contract to complete this section. Initial ground survey and borehole samples took place for the section in 2020. In August 2024, three contractors were shortlisted for this scheme: Balfour Beatty Civil Engineering Ltd, Wills Bros Civil Engineering Ltd and John Graham Construction Ltd. After the £152.7m contract was awarded to Wills Bros in July 2025, preliminary work started in November 2025, with main construction to start in spring 2026. Work on the fourth section will end in 2028, which is the same as the third section between Tomatin and Moy.

A prior information notice was published for the 4-mile (6.4 km) section between Pitlochry and Killiecrankie in May 2025, the fifth section of the project. It passes through nearby designated environmental sites including the River Tay Special Area of Conservation. The contractor for this section will also upgrade existing at-grade junctions at Pitlochry North and Pitlochry South and convert them both into grade separated junctions. In November 2025, three contractors (Balfour Beatty, Kier Transportation, and Wills Bros) were shortlisted for the £205 million contract to upgrade this section. The contract is expected to be awarded in autumn 2026 and the new dual carriageway is expected to open by 2030. Four other sections of the project will be awarded contracts between 2028 and 2030.

Transport Scotland made orders for the 15-mile section between Dalraddy and Slochd in December 2024. This was followed by Crubenmore to Kincraig a month later leaving the Pass of Birnam to Tay Crossing section as the last to start the statutory process. Draft orders were published on 30 May 2025, highlighting the start of the statutory process for this section. It will introduce two new grade-separated junctions and a new roundabout. When upgraded, it will bring many benefits to the surrounding areas.

=== Progress ===
As of October 2025, 35% of the A9 between Perth and Inverness is a dual carriageway. This will rise to 48% by the end of 2030, 85% by the end of 2033 and 100% by the end of 2035.

Unless stated otherwise, the source for the table is:

Section	Length	Status	Start of work	End of work	Type of contract
Kincraig to Dalraddy	4.7 mi (7.5km)	Complete	Sep 2015	Sep 2017	D&B
Luncarty to Pass of Birnam	5.9 mi (9.5 km)	Complete	Feb 2019	Aug 2021	D&B
Tomatin to Moy	6 mi (9.6 km)	Under construction	May 2025	2028	D&B
Tay Crossing to Ballinluig	5.1 mi (8.2 km)	Under construction	Nov 2025	2028	D&B
Pitlochry to Killiecrankie	4 mi (6.4 km)	In preparation	2026	2030	D&B
Pass of Birnam to Tay Crossing	5.2 mi (8.4 km)	In preparation	2028	2032	D&B
Dalraddy to Slochd	15.6 mi (25 km)	In preparation	2028	2033	MIM
Dalwhinnie to Crubenmore	6.9 mi (11 km)	In preparation	2028	2033	MIM
Crubenmore to Kincraig	10.3 mi (16.5 km)	In preparation	2030	2035	MIM
Glen Garry to Dalwhinnie	5.9 mi (9.5 km)	In preparation	2030	2035	MIM
Killiecrankie to Glen Garry	13.8 mi (22 km)	In preparation	2030	2035	MIM

== Delays ==
The construction project started in September 2015, and was originally scheduled for completion in 2025, but in February 2023, the Scottish Government reported that the original deadline was "unachievable". A review from the BBC stated that the civil engineers knew that finishing the project by its original deadline of 2025 was going to be impossible. In December 2023, Transport Scotland announced that this deadline was postponed to late 2035 and announced a new delivery plan. Former first minister of Scotland Nicola Sturgeon stated that the reason for the delay was because it "faced significant challenges beyond their control, including from Brexit and the Covid pandemic" She apologised that the 2025 deadline could not be met. She denied that the Scottish National Party (SNP) or the Scottish Government "messed up". Other factors included the Russian invasion of Ukraine.

These claims were not well received by residents at the northern end of the A9, and it was pointed out that issues such as Brexit, the COVID-19 pandemic and the war in Ukraine were not factors when the project started to slow down, with former First Minister Alex Salmond believing the project became less of a priority after he left the Scottish Government in 2014. The first two sections of the scheme were already delayed by no more than a couple of months. Only 11 out of 90 miles of the A9 were converted to dual carriageway from 2015 to 2023, leaving 79 miles to be dualled. According to a 2012 report, Alex Neil, Cabinet Secretary for Infrastructure and Capital Investment, said that the "2025 [deadline] was challenging but achievable"

In September 2023, Fergus Ewing was suspended by the SNP, in part for criticising the party for the A9 dualling delays. In March 2024, Ewing, a longstanding MSP, and former minister in the Scottish Government, issued a public letter to Transport Secretary Fiona Hyslop highlighting delays to the project and continuing fatalities on the road. In November 2024, the SNP announced it was considering slashing the national speed limit on single carriageway roads nationwide from 60 mph to 50 mph, causing major concern from campaigners that it would further push back dualling of the A9, or lead to the project being cancelled outright, and that a further reduced speed limit would only increase frustration and lead to more accidents. The consultation to reduce the national speed limit on single carriageways from 60 to 50 mph was rejected on 15 December 2025, after over 77% of the 19,500 responses objected to the reduced speed limit. On the other hand, proposals to increase the HGV speed limit on single carriageways to 50 mph (to align with England and Wales plus the A9 between Perth and Inverness) have been approved.

There were calls to accelerate the dualling programme and to prioritise upgrading the deadliest sections of single carriageway. This was rejected by the Scottish Government in January 2025, which risks the project to miss its already-delayed deadline of 2035. Transport Scotland reported that in order to meet the 2035 deadline, there could be up to 43 miles (70 km) of concurrent roadworks on the A9. Each section of roadworks will be limited to 15 miles (24 km).

== Criticism ==
Plans to dual the A9 and A96 have been criticised by Patrick Harvie of the Scottish Greens, who has said the plans were incompatible with the Scottish Government's climate initiatives. A study in 2016 found that the dualling project would cost more to construct than it would bring in, including wider economic benefits. The Scottish Government was criticised by the Highland Council for stalling the project. However, in 2024, the Transport Secretary of the Scottish Government stated that net zero Scotland would still need roads and the government had committed to continuing with the dualling project. A report from The Inverness Courier feared that the A9 dualling project is at risk due to the Scottish Government cuts as Shona Robison, the finance secretary, states that "we cannot afford all of our capital commitments". The 40 mph (64 km/h) speed limit had led to some driver frustration when the section between Luncarty and Pass of Birnam was upgraded in 2021. It was also reported that £340 million were spent on the design and planning stages of the programme, after only 11 miles of the A9 were upgraded to dual carriageway. A public local inquiry was launched in 2026 on the 5-mile (8 km) £478 million section between Pass of Birnam and Tay Crossing, after receiving objections to the proposed scheme.

The A9 runs through the site of the Battle of Killiecrankie. Expanding the road in that location will destroy some of the historic battleground. Transport Scotland said dualling the road will have "some impact" on the site.
