= Moy, Highland =

Coordinates: 57.38106°N 4.0452°W

Moy: Scottish Gaelic: A' Mhoigh
- Location within the Inverness area
- OS grid reference: NH771337
  - Edinburgh: 104 mi (167 km)
  - London: 435 mi (700 km)
- Council area: Highland
- Lieutenancy area: Inverness
- Country: Scotland
- Sovereign state: United Kingdom
- Post town: Inverness
- Postcode district: IV13 7
- Police: Scotland
- Fire: Scottish
- Ambulance: Scottish
- UK Parliament: Inverness, Skye and West Ross-shire
- Scottish Parliament: Inverness and Nairn

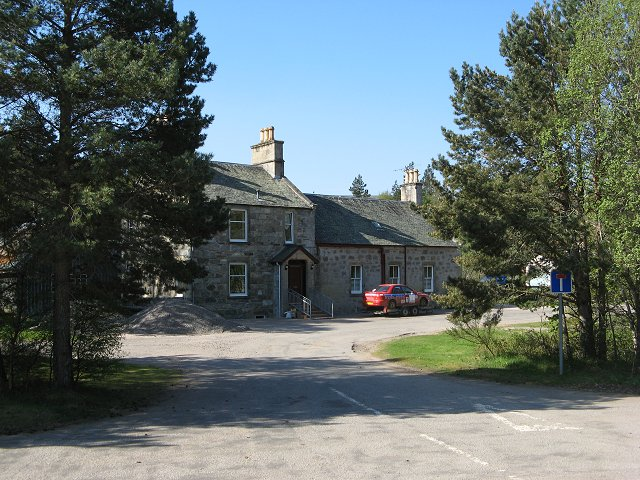
The old railway station at Moy

The village of Moy (Scottish Gaelic: A' Mhoigh) is situated between the villages of Daviot and Tomatin, in the Highland region of Scotland. It sits beside Loch Moy and used to have a railway station on the Inverness and Aviemore Direct Railway.

On 16 February 1746 Charles Edward Stuart spent the night at Moy Hall. To prevent the troops from Inverness descending on the estate in surprise during the night, Lady Anne Farquharson-Mackintosh sent Donald Fraser, the blacksmith, and four other retainers to watch the road from Inverness. Surely enough, during the night, several hundred government troops were detected marching down the road. The Mackintosh defenders started beating their swords on rocks, jumping from place to place and shouting the war cries of different clans in the Chattan Confederation. Thinking that they had been ambushed, the government troops retreated leaving Inverness open for the prince to capture the next day, an event known as the Rout of Moy. There was only one casualty of the incident. The piper for the Hanoverian troops, possibly a MacCrimmon of the famous MacCrimmon piping family, was killed.
