= List of road projects in the UK =

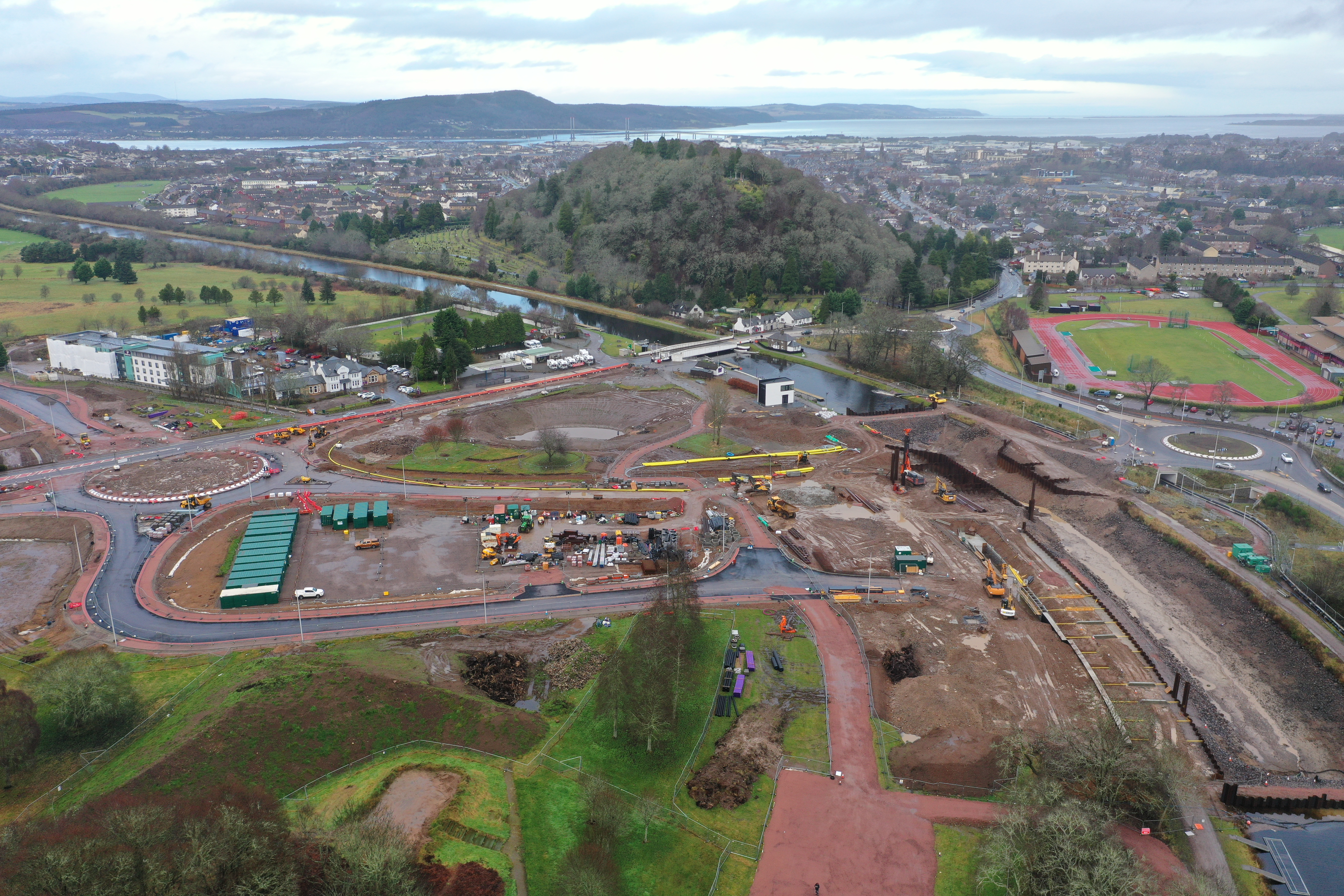
The Inverness Trunk Road Link West Section under construction in January 2020

This article lists current and planned road building in the United Kingdom. Significant investment is expected, including plans for £14 billion of investment in road expansion by England's National Highways. In addition to physical expansion, smart motorways have been pursued as a means to increase capacity by introducing regular traffic on the hard shoulder. Transport is devolved, projects in Scotland, Wales, and Northern Ireland are delivered in co-operation with the devolved authorities of Transport Scotland, the Welsh Government, and DfI Roads respectively.

== New roads under construction ==
=== England ===
- Heyhouses Link Road
- Wichelstowe Southern Access
- Grantham Southern Bypass
- A5 to A43 link (Towcester bypass)
- St Austell to A30 link road
- Botley Bypass
- Lyminster Bypass
- North-South Link Road (Weston-Super-Mare)
- Mottram Bypass (under preparation for construction)
- Black Cat to Caxton Gibbet. A new 16 km (9.9 miles)-long dual carriageway, to be renamed A421, mostly paralleling the existing A428 road, between the A1 south of St Neots and Caxton Gibbet, with enlarged junctions at either end. A £507 million contract to build the scheme was awarded in March 2021.
- Carlisle Southern Link Road
- Lower Thames Crossing

=== Northern Ireland ===
- Newtownards Movilla Road to Donaghadee Road and Bangor Road Link
- Larne Distributor (South)

== Proposed new roads ==
- Shrewsbury North West Relief Road
- A new route to parallel the existing A83, currently under consultations
- A27 Arundel bypass
- A46 Newark-on-Trent bypass, under planning, expected to cost between £400m and £500m
- Northampton North-West Relief Road, a 1.9 km (1.2 miles) bypass
- A509 Isham bypass. Will start at Junction 9 A14 Kettering, bypassing Isham village reconnecting at Great Harrowden, reducing traffic between Kettering and Wellingborough.
- Ashbourne bypass (a new 2.8 km road to the west of Ashbourne in Derbyshire)
- Norwich Western Link route, a proposed new 3.8 mile dual carriageway road in Norfolk
- A new 2.4 km (1.5 miles) dual carriageway west of Elmstead Market linking the A120 and the A133. Planning application submitted in April 2021 with an expected cost of £70 million.
- A5036 Port of Liverpool Access
- A66 Dualling Temple Sowerby to Appleby
- A66 Dualling Stephen Bank to Carkin Moor
- A64 Dualling Hopgrove to Barton-le-Willows, currently under planning,
- Banwell Bypass – from the A371 west of Banwell, Somerset, to the A368 near Sandford, with a spur towards the A371 Winscombe.
- A new link road between the M54 and the M6, will be constructed. A timeline is expected to be given by spring 2026. It is currently expected to cost of between £175 million and £200 million
- Bean Road Underpass – a planned 75 m tunnel in Kent to link the Whitecliffe/Eastern Quarry housing area with Bluewater Shopping Centre, primarily for Fastrack buses plus a pedestrian and cycle path.

== Expansion ==
- Dualling of the A9 between Perth and Inverness
  - A9 Tomatin to Moy (due 2027)
  - A9 Tay Crossing to Ballinluig (due 2028)
- A9/A82 Longman Junction Improvement Scheme
- Dualling of the A96
  - A96 Inverness to Nairn including Nairn Bypass
- A66 Dualling:
  - Penrith to Temple Sowerby
  - Appleby to Brough
  - Bowes Bypass
  - Cross Lanes to Rokeby
- Dualling of 8 km (5 mi) of the A1 between Alnwick and Ellingham and 12.9 km (8 mi) between Morpeth and Felton, This is still awaiting government consent with a decision now due in June 2024
- Dualling of the A47 between North Tuddenham and Easton, expected to cost £100 million to £250 million, and between Blofield and North Burlingham at a cost of £50 million to £100 million.
- An additional lane for both sides of the A1 between Birtley and Coal House, a 6.5 km (4.0 miles) stretch. Approved in January 2021, Highways England stated the cost of this scheme was "yet to be determined".
- Partial dualling of the A5, expected to start in 2025 at a cost of £20 million to £25 million
- Capacity increase for three junctions along the A38 in Derby, expected to start in 2021 and be completed by 2024 2025 at a cost of £200 million to £250 million. The Secretary of State approved the scheme's Development Consent Order on 8 January 2021 allowing the scheme to proceed
- M60 Simister Island junction 18 capacity increase, expected to be constructed between 2026 and 2028 at a cost of between £207–£340 million
- M42 capacity increase, including a new 2.4 km (1.5 miles) long dual-carriageway link road, a new junction, junction capacity increases, and a new pedestrian overbridge. Expected to be completed in 2024 2025 at a cost of £282 million.
- Berryden corridor, a road-widening project in Aberdeen
- Grade separation of the Sheriffhall roundabout on the Edinburgh City Bypass, expected to cost £120 million
- A465 Dowlais Top to Hirwaun (Section 5 and 6)
- A1231 Dualling, Sunderland
- A4440 Dualling, Worcester
- A6 dualling - M22 to Castledawson
- A6 dualling - Dungiven to Derry, under construction
- M2 junction 5 (with the A249) capacity increase, started September 2021 and completed Summer 2025 and cost £100 million
- M621 junctions 1 to 7, capacity increase, Including extra lanes at J2.
- A64 Askham Bryan Junction Improvement
- M1/M62 Lofthouse Interchange

== Legal challenges ==
Legal challenges against the construction of specific roads:

- A47 road schemes
- A38 road expansion

Transport Action Network challenged the Government over its Road Investment Strategy 2 (RIS2) on climate grounds.

== See also ==
- Proposed British Isles fixed sea link connections
- List of road protests in the UK and Ireland
- Welsh Government roads review — 2023 cancellation of most road projects in Wales
