= Carrbridge railway station =

Railway station in Highland, Scotland

Carrbridge Scottish Gaelic: Drochaid Chàrr
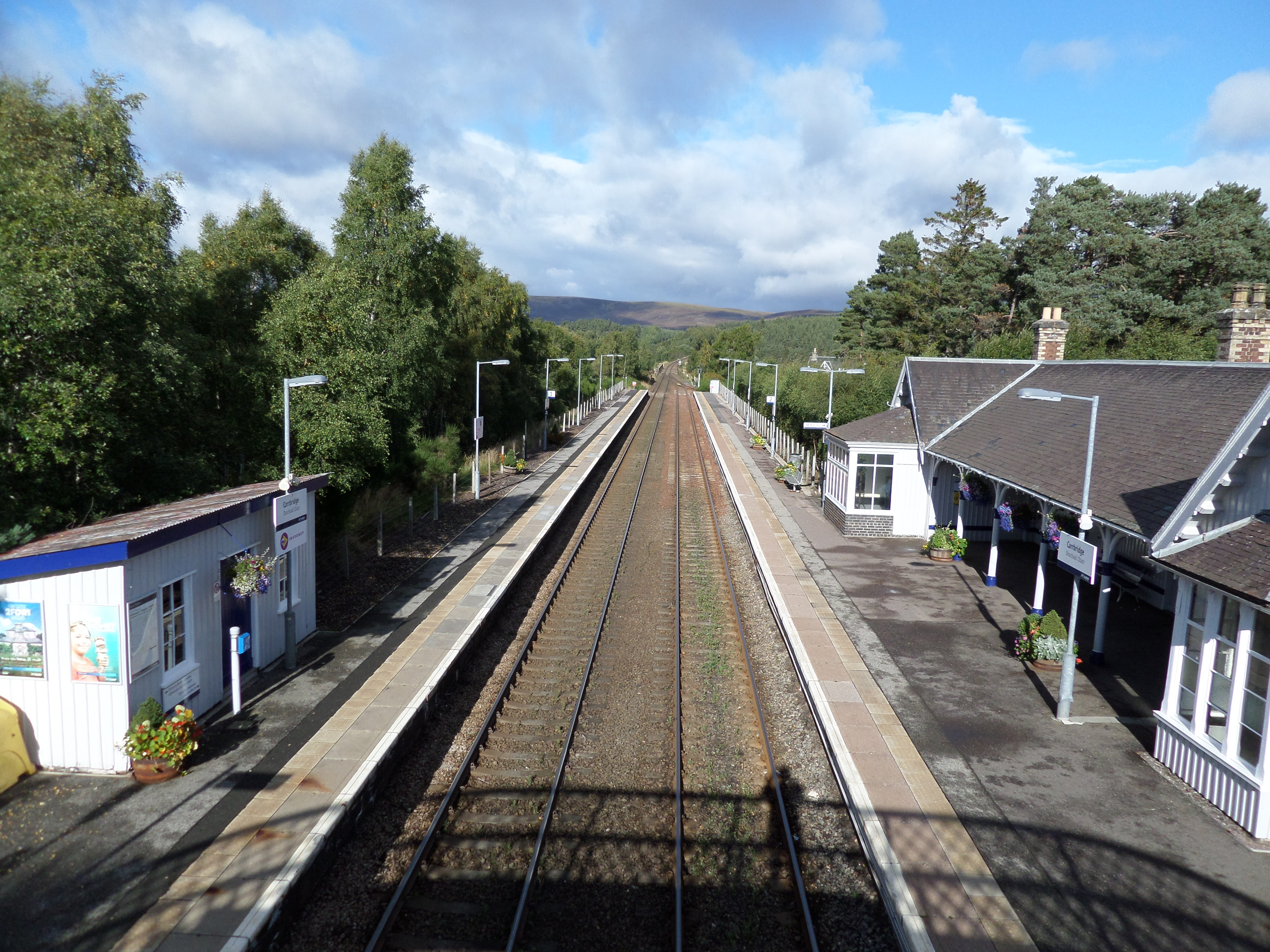
- Carrbridge railway station, looking towards Inverness

General information
- Location: Carrbridge, Highland; Scotland
- Coordinates: 57.2794°N 3.8280°W
- Grid reference: NH899224
- Manager: ScotRail
- Platforms: 2

Other information
- Station code: CAG

History
- Original company: Highland Railway
- Pre-grouping: Highland Railway
- Post-grouping: London Midland and Scottish Railway

Key dates
- 8 July 1892: Opened as Carr Bridge
- 16 May 1983: Renamed as Carrbridge

Passengers
- 2021/22: ▲3,714
- 2022/23: ▲4,840
- 2023/24: ▲6,544
- 2024/25: ▲7,020
- 2025/26: ▲7,770
Location
Notes
- Passenger statistics from the Office of Rail and Road

Carrbridge railway station serves the village of Carrbridge, Highland, Scotland. The railway station is managed by ScotRail and is on the Highland Main Line, 90 miles (140 kilometres) from Perth, between Aviemore and Inverness.

== History ==
The station was opened on 8 July 1892 when the Highland Railway opened the line from Aviemore.

Services northbound started on 8 July 1897 when the line to Daviot was opened. The line through to Inverness opened on 1 November 1898.

The station was built with a passing loop on the otherwise single track railway, a signal box (automatic token-exchange apparatus was used) and several sidings on the north side of the line.

The station building is thought to be by the architect William Roberts, dating from 1898. A camping coach was positioned here by the Scottish Region from 1954 to 1965.

=== Accidents and incidents ===
There have been two accidents at Carrbridge, one in 1914 and another in 2010.

==== 1914 bridge collapse ====
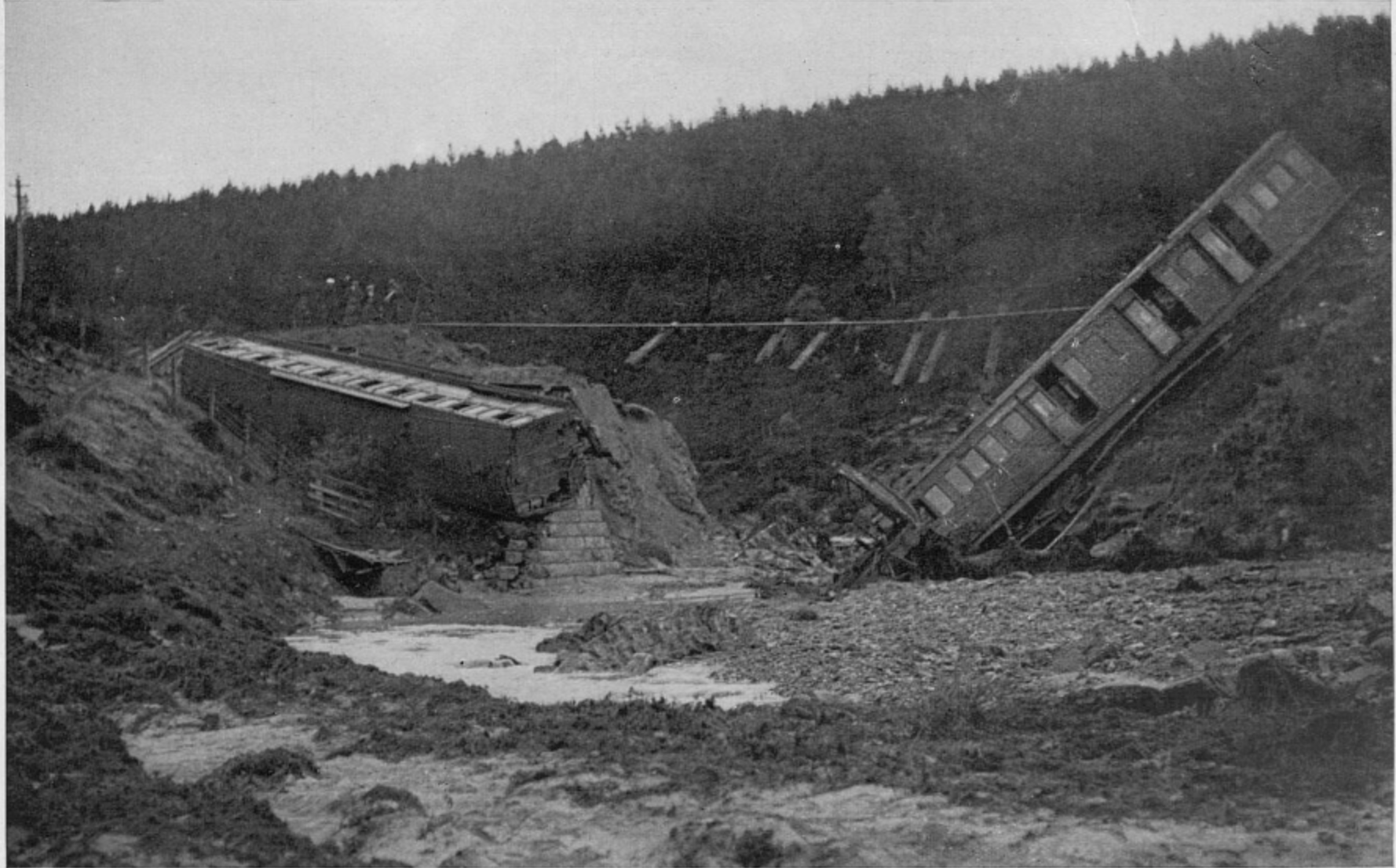
Photograph of the 1914 accident by J. Barron of Inverness, published in The Sphere, 27 June 1914

On the afternoon of 18 June 1914, a tremendous thunderstorm struck the mountains to the north of the Highland Main Line. The road bridge carrying the road from Carrbridge to Inverness across the Baddengorm Burn was swept away, while further down the valley the burn entered a narrow gorge, crossed by the railway by means of a narrow arch span of only 15 ft (4.6 m). The water was at rail level when the six-carriage 11:50 Perth to Inverness train, 9 minutes late leaving Carrbridge Station at 15:24, crossed the bridge. The first two carriages reached the other side but the bridge then gave way, its foundations having been undermined by a vortex of water. The third carriage was left on the north bank of the burn but the next was plunged into the torrent which soon demolished the carriage, drowning five passengers; remarkably four survived.

==== 2010 freight train derailment ====
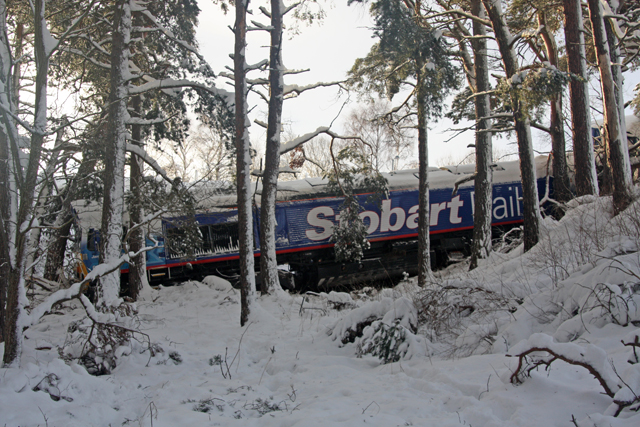
Derailed Class 66 locomotive 66 048 at Carrbridge, in 2010

On 4 January 2010, a freight train from Inverness to Grangemouth, hauled by a DB Schenker Class 66 for Stobart Rail, derailed on the 1 in 60 (1.67%) gradient down from Slochd Summit at the run out or trap points at the northern end of the station, and ran down an embankment. The driver and technician on the train suffered minor injuries. The line was not reopened until 13 January.

The RAIB report found that the cause was snow and ice that worked its way into the space between the wheels' brake blocks. This may also have interfered with other parts of the brake mechanisms on the freight wagons. It was also found that the way the driver performed running brake tests while on the trip contributed to the outcome. Other possible contributing factors were that ploughed snow may have been allowed to accumulate too close to the tracks, thus the train passing these snowbanks at speed may have pulled snow into the brake mechanisms.

== Facilities ==
The station has a car park, with bike racks, but is not permanently staffed. Flowering shrubs on the platforms are tended by volunteers as part of an 'adopt a station' initiative. Platform 1 has a specific waiting shelter, whilst passengers on platform 2 have to make do with the station buildings. Both platforms also have benches, whilst platform 2 also has a help point. Only platform 2 has step-free access - platform 1 can only be reached via the footbridge. As there are no facilities to purchase tickets, passengers must buy one in advance, or from the guard on the train.

== Platform layout ==
It has a passing loop 30 chains (600 m) long, flanked by two platforms which can each accommodate a thirteen-coach train.

== Passenger volume ==
Passenger Volume at Carrbridge
	2004–05	2005–06	2006–07	2007–08	2008–09	2009–10	2010–11	2011–12	2012–13	2013–14	2014–15	2015–16	2016–17	2017–18	2018–19	2019–20	2020–21	2021–22	2022–23	2023–24	2024–25
Entries and exits	1,910	2,987	3,954	5,438	3,796	4,500	5,118	5,636	4,454	5,540	6,256	6,898	5,808	6,064	5,584	5,474	1,622	3,714	4,840	6,544	7,020

The statistics cover twelve month periods that start in April.

== Services ==
As of May 2026, there are 6 trains per day northbound to Inverness and southbound to Perth, the latter continuing mostly to Glasgow Queen Street, with one continuing to Edinburgh. 4 trains call each way on Sundays, including the southbound Highland Chieftain to London King's Cross. The Caledonian Sleeper serves the station northbound only, six nights per week.

Preceding station	National Rail	Following station
Aviemore	London North Eastern Railway; Sunday & Southbound Only	Inverness
Aviemore	ScotRail; Highland Main Line	Inverness
Aviemore	Caledonian Sleeper; Northbound, weekdays only	Inverness
	Historical railways	
Aviemore; Line and station open	Highland Railway; Inverness and Aviemore Direct Railway	Tomatin; Line open; station closed

== Bibliography ==
- Brailsford, Martyn, ed. (December 2017) [1987]. Railway Track Diagrams 1: Scotland & Isle of Man (6th ed.). Frome: Trackmaps. ISBN 978-0-9549866-9-8.
- Butt, R. V. J. (October 1995). The Directory of Railway Stations: details every public and private passenger station, halt, platform and stopping place, past and present (1st ed.). Sparkford: Patrick Stephens Ltd. ISBN 978-1-85260-508-7. OCLC 60251199. OL 11956311M.
- Gifford, John (1992). The Buildings of Scotland, Highland and Islands. Yale University Press. ISBN 0-300-09625-9.
- Jowett, Alan (March 1989). Jowett's Railway Atlas of Great Britain and Ireland: From Pre-Grouping to the Present Day (1st ed.). Sparkford: Patrick Stephens Ltd. ISBN 978-1-85260-086-0. OCLC 22311137.
- McRae, Andrew (1998). British Railways Camping Coach Holidays: A Tour of Britain in the 1950s and 1960s. Vol. Scenes from the Past: 30 (Part Two). Foxline. ISBN 1-870119-53-3.
- Quick, Michael (2022) [2001]. Railway passenger stations in Great Britain: a chronology (PDF). version 5.04. Railway & Canal Historical Society. Archived from the original (PDF) on 25 November 2022.
- Thomas, John; Turnock, David (1989). A Regional History of the Railways of Great Britain. Vol. 15 The North of Scotland (1st ed.). Newton Abbott, Devon: David & Charles. ISBN 0-946537-03-8.
