= Jubilee Bridge (Tay) =

Road bridge in Perth and Kinross, Scotland

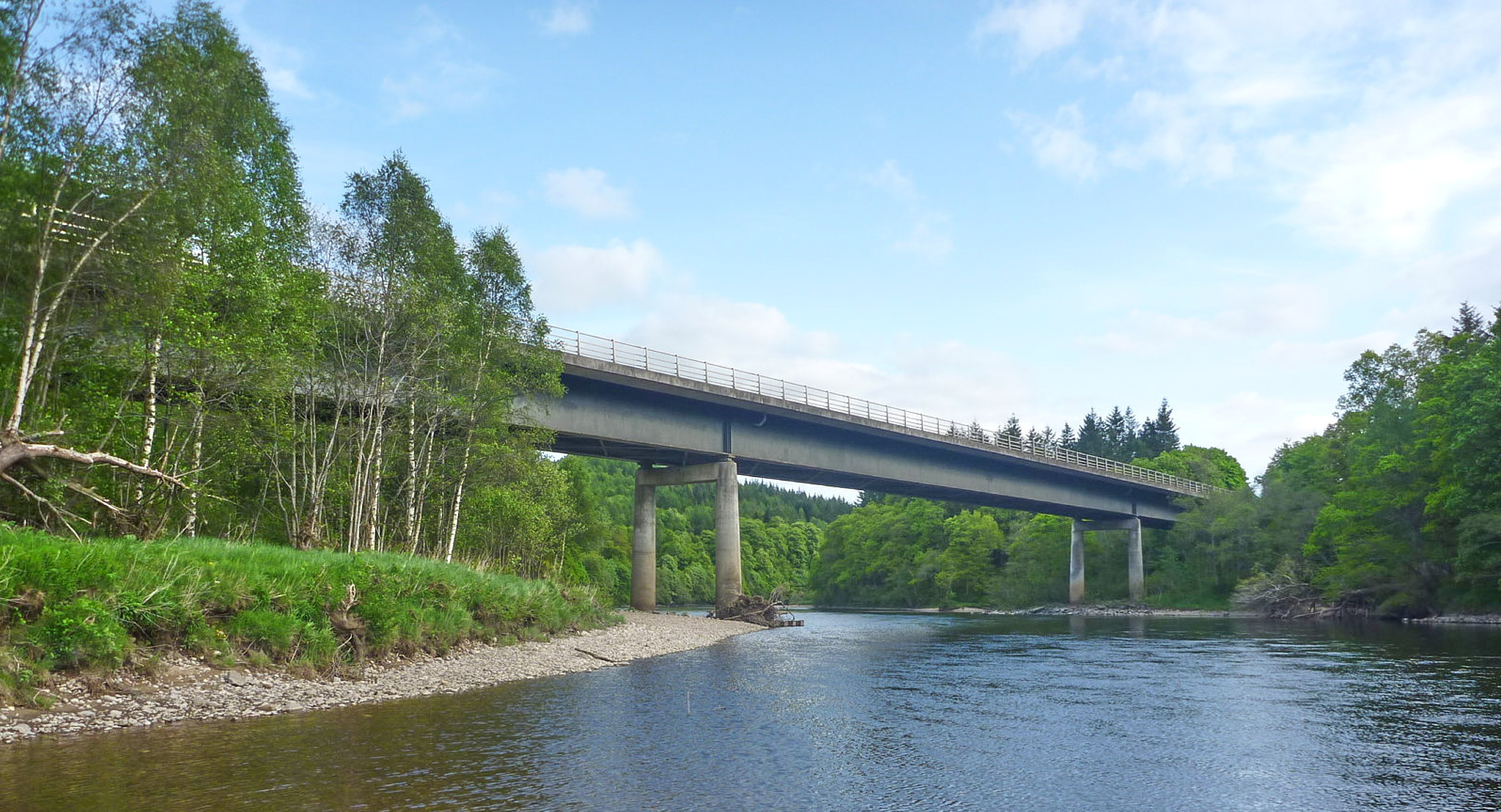
- Jubilee Bridge over the River Tay, looking downstream (south), taken from river level
- Coordinates: 56.5756°N 3.6219°W
- Carries: A9
- Crosses: River Tay
- Locale: Perth and Kinross
- Other name: Tay Crossing

Characteristics
- Total length: 225 metres (738 ft)

History
- Opened: May 1977

Location
- Interactive map of Jubilee Bridge

The Jubilee Bridge is a 254 m (833 ft) road bridge over the River Tay near Dunkeld in Scotland. The bridge conveys the A9 road over the river. A concrete box bridge also joins the Jubilee Bridge at its southern end as it carries the A9 over the Highland Main Line. The area of the River Tay below the bridge is accessible for personal watercraft and walkers. As part of the A9 dualling project, the bridge will be duplicated by 2032.

== History ==
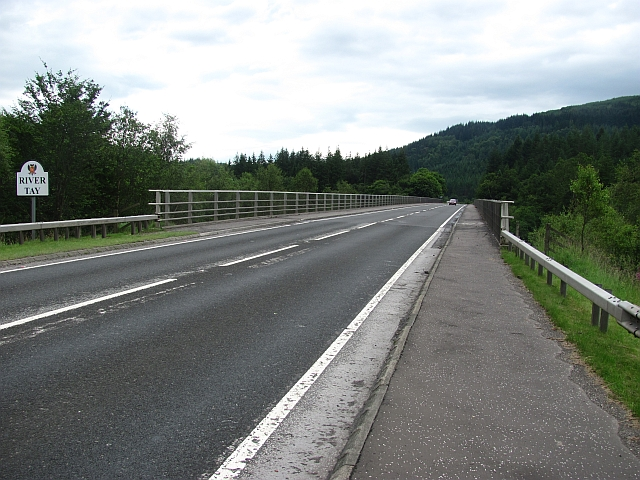
The A9 on the top of the bridge

Before the bridge was secured in place, much of the bridge works took place north of the river. The bridge was named after the Silver Jubilee of Elizabeth II and completed in May 1977. The bridge is composed of a concrete reinforced deck supported by steel girders in three spans and on two pairs of piers that are positioned at the edge of the river. The bridge construction cost £1.3 million and the consulting engineers for the project were Babtie Shaw & Morton. The bridge has footpaths on both sides.

The construction of the bridge is featured in the 1982 documentary A9 Highland Highway about the reconstruction of the A9 now in the National Library of Scotland. The bridge received a Civic Trust award for the effectiveness of its integration with the adjacent landscape.

== Improvements ==
In December 2018, essential works were carried out on the bridge to replace a damaged joint to ensure the bridge remained safe for traffic. In 2018 and 2019, boreholes and trial pits were dug adjacent to the bridge in preparation for improvements.

The bridge will be duplicated as part of the A9 dualling project (section: Tay Crossing to Ballinluig) with improvement works expected between 2025 and 2032. The project (and therefore the second bridge) was supposed to be complete in 2025, but delays to the project meant that the doubled bridge is scheduled to be finished by 2032 instead and the overall project in 2035.

== See also ==
- List of bridges in Scotland
