= Moy railway station =

Disused railway station in Moy, Highland

Moy
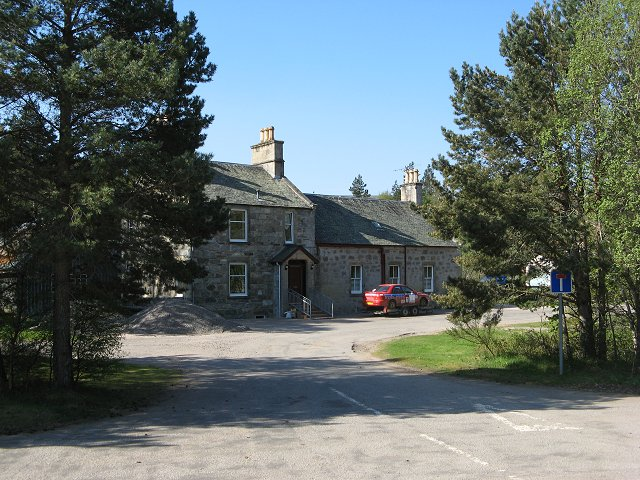
- The site of the station in 2007

General information
- Location: Moy, Highland; Scotland
- Coordinates: 57.3841°N 4.0574°W
- Grid reference: NH764344
- Platforms: 2

Other information
- Status: Disused

History
- Original company: Highland Railway
- Pre-grouping: Highland Railway
- Post-grouping: London, Midland and Scottish Railway

Key dates
- 8 July 1897: Opened
- 3 May 1965: Closed
Location

Moy railway station served the village of Moy, Highland, Scotland from 1897 to 1965 on the Inverness and Aviemore Direct Railway.

== History ==
The station was opened on 19 July 1897 by the Inverness and Aviemore Direct Railway. The station building was situated on the southbound platform. Goods facilities were handled to the northeast. There were two signal boxes: north and east. Despite their names, they were both situated to the west. The station closed to both passenger and goods traffic on 3 May 1965.

Preceding station	Historical railways	Following station
Tomatin; Line open, station closed	Highland Railway; Inverness and Aviemore Direct Railway	Daviot; Line open, station closed
