= Kincraig =

Coordinates: 57.12835°N 3.934143°W

Kincraig: Scottish Gaelic: Ceann na Creige
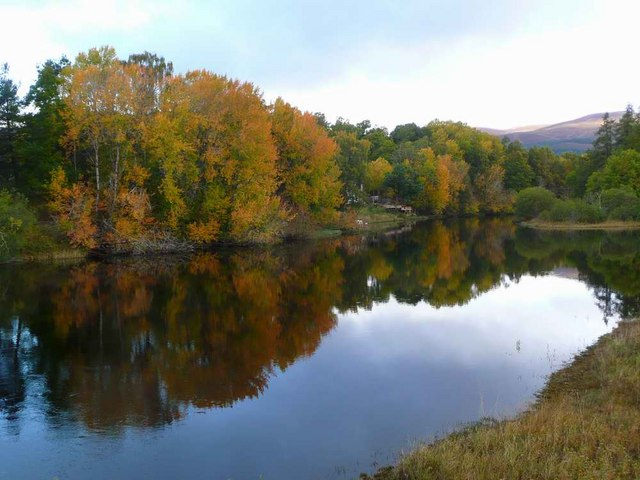
- Autumn colour at Kincraig The river Spey is calm and reflects the first turning of leaves to autumn colour.

- Location within the Badenoch and Strathspey area
- OS grid reference: NH830058
- Council area: Highland
- Country: Scotland
- Sovereign state: United Kingdom
- Post town: Kingussie
- Postcode district: PH21 1
- Police: Scotland
- Fire: Scottish
- Ambulance: Scottish

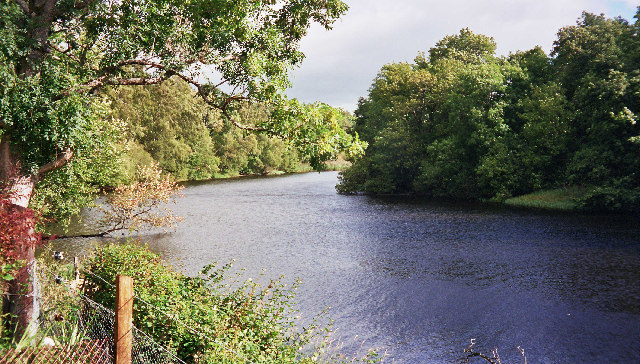
The River Spey at Kincraig

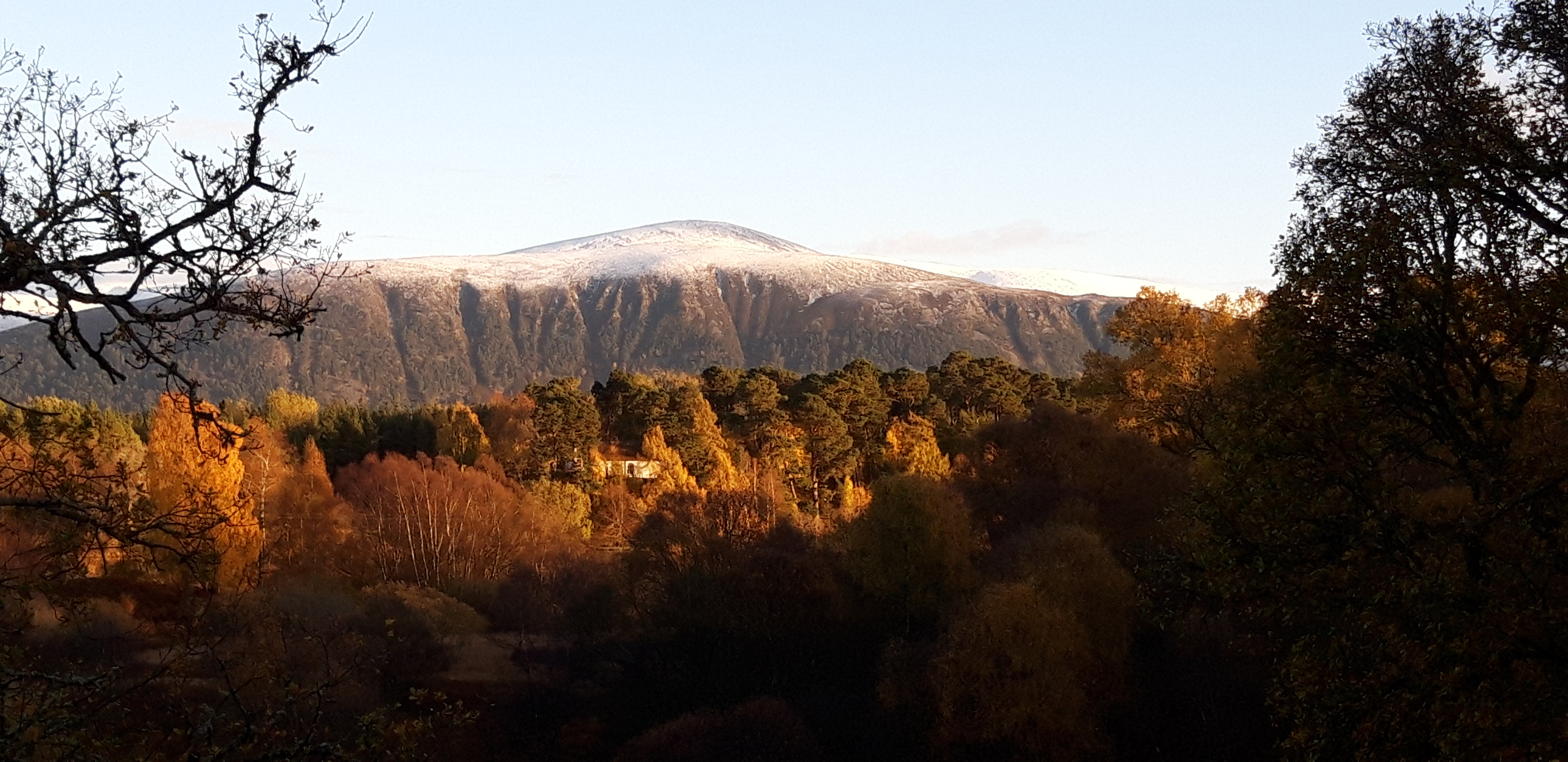
Creag Mhigeachaidh from Kincraig

Kincraig (Scottish Gaelic: Ceann na Creige) is a village located north of Kingussie and south of Aviemore in Highland, Scotland. Its original name was Boat of Inch, reflecting the ferry boat crossing of the Spey River that once operated here but the name was changed after a single track bridge was erected in 1871.

The village lies at the side of the former A9, the B9152, and close to the current dual carriageway, which was upgraded in 2017 as part of the A9 dualling project. It is close to Loch Insh which is fed from and drains into the river Spey. It has a pub and village hall, but Kincraig Stores and Post Office, which traded continuously for 120 years, closed in July 2016. It was reopened in June 2019 as 'Old Post Office Cafe Gallery'. The main Perth to Inverness railway passes through the village, although the station closed in 1965.

There is a mix of housing ages and types, from Victorian stone build cottages and villas, through 1930s terraces, to 1980s' individually-designed detached houses in their own plots to a 1990s estate of detached houses.

Alvie Primary School is located at the north end, the Loch Inch Outdoor Centre about 2 miles south east and The Highland Wildlife Park about 3 miles south west.
