= Shrewsbury North West Relief Road =

Proposed road construction project in Shropshire, England

The Shrewsbury North West Relief Road is a proposed 4 miles (6.4 km) long single-carriageway bypass for Shrewsbury in England. It gained approval under the Conservative-run administration in Shropshire Council, but required additional funding in order to be built. Following the election of a Liberal Democrat majority in 2025, work on the project was paused.

== History ==
The road has been discussed officially since the mid-1980s. Plans to introduce tolls to fund the road were explored, but dismissed in December 2007.

In 2019, the cost was stated to be £71 million. In April 2021, the cost was stated to be £84.3 million. £54 million was promised from national government funding with local government picking up the rest, including any overspend.

Despite some opposition, the relief road was approved in 2024. By this time the costs are believed to have reached £120 million and Shropshire Council are unable to pay for it without additional funding from the national government.

Following the election of a Lib Dem majority in the 2025 Shropshire Council election, the project was paused, with the intention of negotiating with the Department for Transport over the use of the grant, and was reported to have been officially cancelled in February 2026.

== Route ==
The road would connect the A5 in the west with the A5124 in the east, creating a complete ring road around Shrewsbury. It will cross the River Severn via a 668 metres (2,192 ft) long viaduct near to the Darwin Trail and be close to sites of scientific interest and an ancient woodland, necessitating the felling of some trees.

== Reception ==
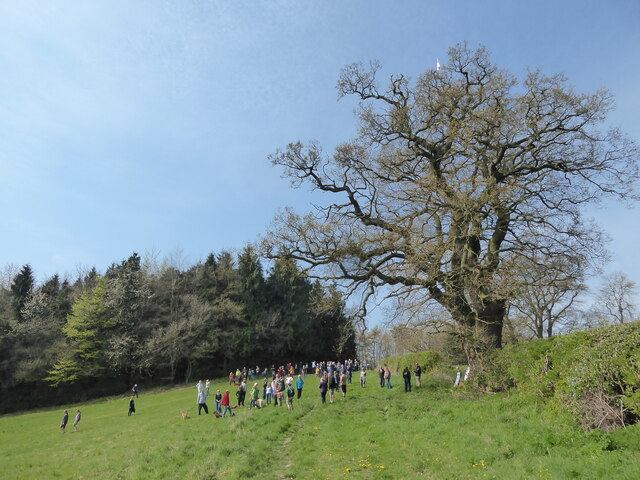
Protests against the road in April 2021

The Conservative administration argued that the road would reduce congestion and unlock new land for housing. The scheme has received over 5,000 formal objections and has been criticised for being contradictory to the council's net zero by 2030 pledge.

The project has been criticised by climate activists for its environmental impact. They claimed the road would require at least 29 trees to be felled including one which is over 550 years old.

During the 2024 general election campaign, BBC Radio Shropshire hosted a debate between the local candidates with only the incumbent Conservative Party MP Daniel Kawczynski speaking out in favour of the project with all of his opponents opposed to it. Following the election, the newly elected Labour Party MP Julia Buckley reportedly believed that the money already secured for the project should be used on different projects instead.

== See also ==
- List of road projects in the UK
