= Culloden Moor railway station =

Disused railway station in Culloden, Highland

Culloden Moor
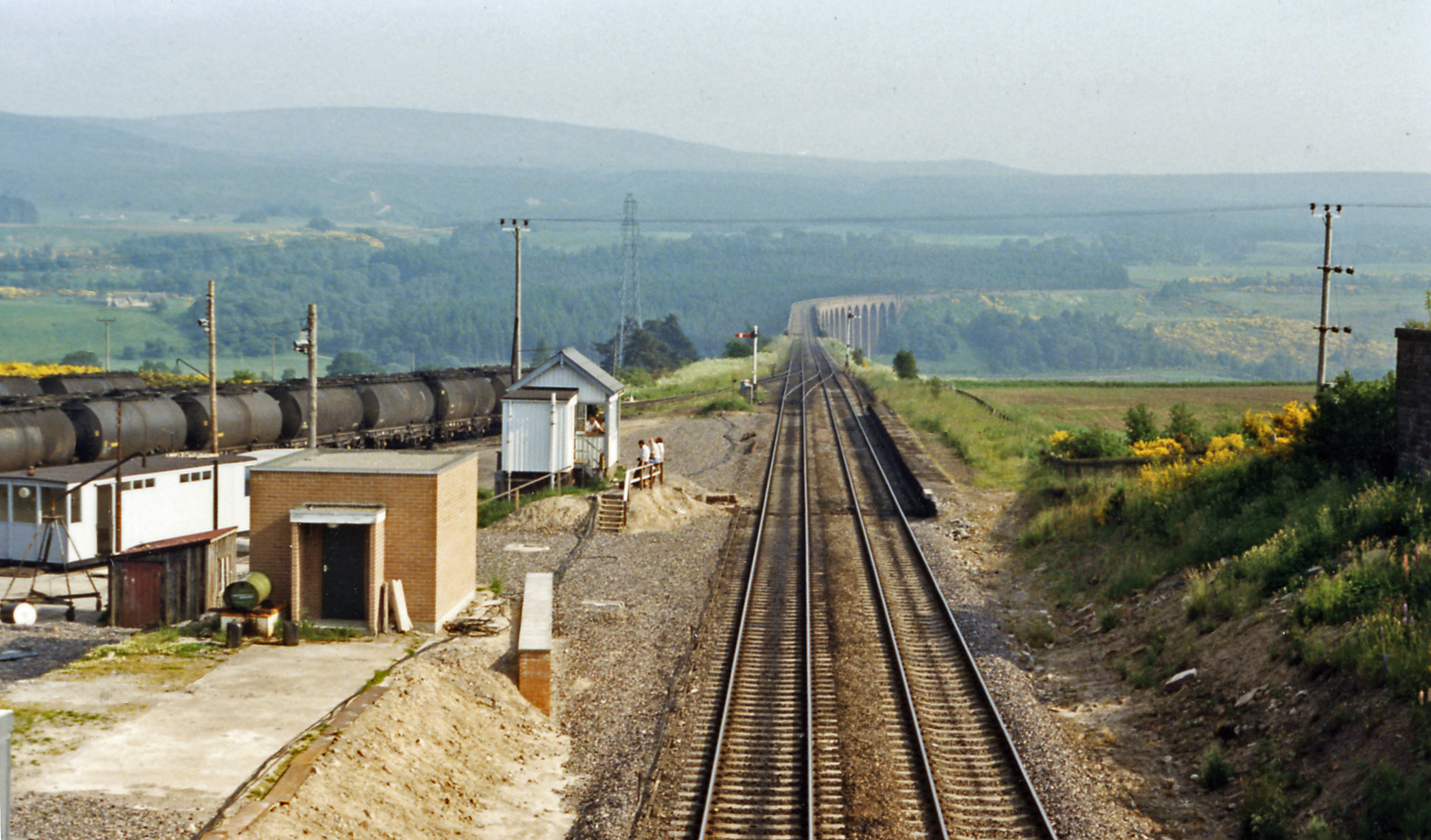
- The remains of the station in 1986

General information
- Location: Culloden, Highland (council area); Scotland
- Coordinates: 57.4844°N 4.0661°W
- Grid reference: NH762456
- Platforms: 2

Other information
- Status: Disused

History
- Original company: Highland Railway
- Pre-grouping: Highland Railway
- Post-grouping: London, Midland and Scottish Railway

Key dates
- 1 November 1898: Opened
- 3 May 1965: Closed
Location

Culloden Moor railway station served the village of Culloden, Highland, Scotland from 1898 to 1965 on the Inverness and Aviemore Direct Railway.

== History ==
The station was opened on 1 November 1898 by the Highland Railway. It closed to both passenger and goods traffic on 3 May 1965.

Preceding station	Historical railways	Following station
Daviot; Line open, station closed	Highland Railway; Inverness and Aviemore Direct Railway	Inverness; Line and station open
