= Loch Moy =

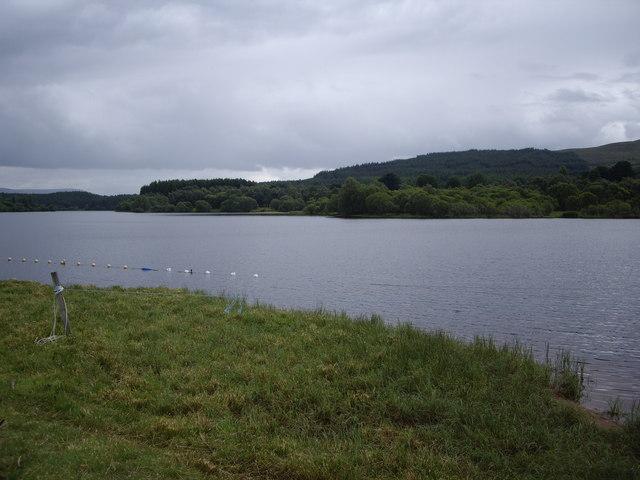

- Location within Scotland
- Location: Scottish Highlands, Scotland
- Coordinates: 57.3836°N 4.0369°W
- Type: loch

Loch Moy (from the Scottish Gaelic Loch A'Mhoigh meaning the Loch of the Plain) is a freshwater loch beside the village of Moy near Inverness in the Scottish Highlands.

== History ==
There is an island on the loch called the Isle of Moy and on this island are the ruins of Moy Castle that was seat of the Chiefs of Clan Mackintosh from the 14th century to about 1700. According to the Old Statistical Account of Scotland there were the ruins of a house with four fire rooms and that above the gate an inscription stated that it had been built in 1665 by Lachlan Mackintosh, 20th chief of Clan Mackintosh. In about 1700, the Mackintoshes built a new seat in-land called Moy Hall.
