= Tomatin railway station =

Disused railway station in Tomatin, Highland

Tomatin
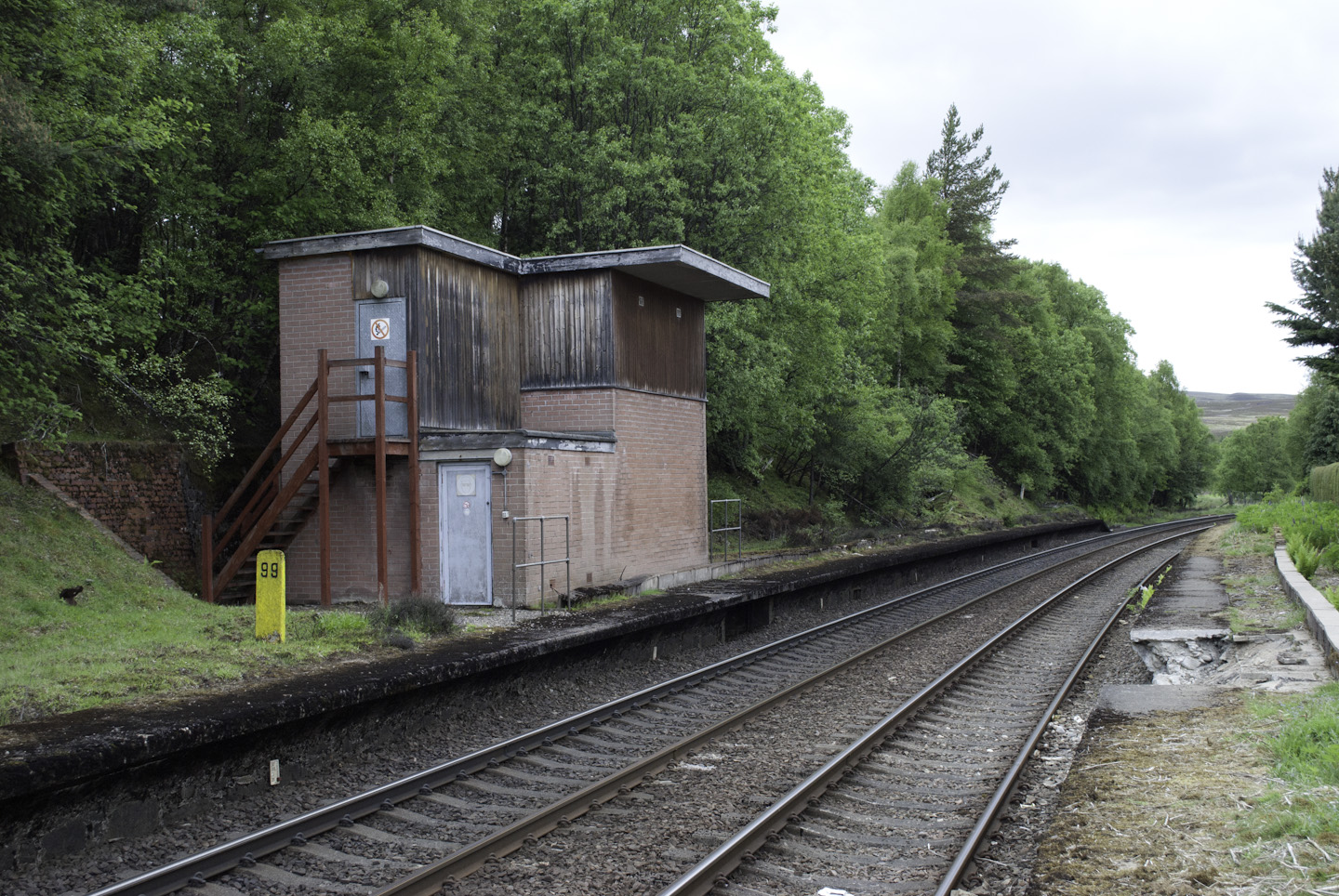
- Site of the former station (2013)

General information
- Location: Tomatin, Highland; Scotland
- Coordinates: 57.3388°N 4.0034°W
- Grid reference: NH795293
- Platforms: 2

Other information
- Status: Disused

History
- Original company: Highland Railway
- Pre-grouping: Highland Railway
- Post-grouping: London, Midland and Scottish Railway

Key dates
- 8 July 1897: Opened
- 3 May 1965: Closed
Location

Tomatin railway station was a railway station that was built to serve the village of Tomatin, Highland, Scotland.

It was used from 1897 to 1965 on the Inverness and Aviemore Direct Railway.

== History ==
The station was opened on 8 July 1897 by the Highland Railway. It closed to both passenger and goods traffic on 3 May 1965.

In 2026 the Scottish Green Party stated in their manifesto that they would put forth proposals to reopen the station.

Preceding station	Historical railways	Following station
Carrbridge; Line and station open	Highland Railway; Inverness and Aviemore Direct Railway	Moy; Line open, station closed
