= Kevin Thain =

Kevin Thain (born 1969) is a Scottish shinty player from the village of Tomatin. He has played almost his whole career for Kingussie Camanachd and has been an integral part of its success since the mid-1980s.

== Playing career ==
Thain announced his arrival in the sport of shinty with a winning goal against Newtonmore in the MacTavish Cup Final in 1986.

He won 18 league titles with Kingussie and is the second highest scorer in shinty history, although his total is dwarfed by that of team-mate, Ronald Ross.

Thain had famously never appeared on the losing side in a Camanachd Cup Final until his 13th final appearance in 2008 when Kingussie was beaten by Fort William.

Thain has now dropped down to second team level in order to help bring on Kingussie's promising youths. He had his nose broken in early 2010 by Andrew Banks of Skye. Due to an injury crisis at Kingussie in early 2011, Thain has been given a recall to the first team squad.

Thain is a businessman and owns an electrician company in the Scottish Highlands. He was working off-shore when Kingussie lost three finals in the early 1990s, during this time he played for Glasgow Mid-Argyll from time to time.

He was given the honour of opening his local community's new sports centre in 2010 in honour of his sporting achievements. Thain also coaches the local shinty team, Strathdearn.
