= List of listed buildings in Daviot and Dunlichity =

This is a list of listed buildings in the parish of Daviot and Dunlichity in Highland, Scotland.

== List ==
Name	Location	Date Listed	Grid Ref. (Note: Sometimes known as OSGB36, the grid reference (where provided) is based on the British national grid reference system used by the Ordnance Survey. • "Guide to National Grid". Ordnance Survey. • "Get-a-map". Ordnance Survey.)	Geo-coordinates	Notes	LB Number (Note: Historic Environment Scotland assign a unique alphanumeric identifier to each designated site in Scotland, for listed buildings this always begins with "LB", for example "LB12345".)	Image
Aberarder House Original 17th Century House Now Rear Service Quarters/Caretaker's Dwelling				57°17′58″N 4°17′27″W	Category B	1697	Upload Photo
Faillie Bridge Over Nairn River				57°24′51″N 4°08′45″W	Category B	1683	Upload Photo
Flichity House				57°19′43″N 4°12′07″W	Category B	1684	Upload Photo
Daviot Parish Church Of Scotland And Burial Ground				57°25′38″N 4°07′39″W	Category B	1700	Upload Photo
Daviot Church Of Scotland Manse				57°25′40″N 4°07′39″W	Category B	1701	Upload Photo
Daviot House (House Of Daviot)				57°26′17″N 4°07′10″W	Category B	1702	Upload Photo
Dunlichity Parish Church Of Scotland, Watch-House Mcgilleveray Burial Enclosure And Burial Ground				57°22′03″N 4°13′48″W	Category B	1704	Upload Photo
Farr, The Old Inn				57°21′35″N 4°11′49″W	Category B	1685	Upload Photo
Culloden Moor, Memorial Cairn				57°28′39″N 4°06′00″W	Category A	1699	Upload another image
Tordarroch Bridge Over The Nairn River				57°22′24″N 4°12′10″W	Category B	1707	Upload Photo
Bridgend Farmhouse, Farm Buildings And Byre				57°18′07″N 4°16′49″W	Category B	42470	Upload Photo
Daviot Mains (Including Horse Engine House)				57°26′17″N 4°07′30″W	Category B	1703	Upload Photo
Dunmaglass Bridge Over River Farigaig				57°17′22″N 4°18′40″W	Category B	1682	Upload Photo
Croachy, Tomintoul House				57°19′34″N 4°13′34″W	Category B	1698	Upload Photo
Littlemill Bridge Over The Allt Na Fuar Ghlaic				57°24′35″N 4°08′59″W	Category C(S)	1705	Upload Photo

== Key ==
The scheme for classifying buildings in Scotland is:

- Category A: "buildings of national or international importance, either architectural or historic; or fine, little-altered examples of some particular period, style or building type."
- Category B: "buildings of regional or more than local importance; or major examples of some particular period, style or building type, which may have been altered."
- Category C: "buildings of local importance; lesser examples of any period, style, or building type, as originally constructed or moderately altered; and simple traditional buildings which group well with other listed buildings."

In March 2016 there were 47,288 listed buildings in Scotland. Of these, 8% were Category A, and 50% were Category B, with the remaining 42% being Category C.

== See also ==
- List of listed buildings in Highland
