= Archibald Cook =

Scottish minister (1788–1865)

Archibald Cook (1788 - 1865) was a Free Church of Scotland minister whose preaching attracted thousands of people and was later published; his main ministry was in Daviot, Highland Inverness-shire from 1844 until his death.

Many of his sermons from Daviot were recorded in a form of short-hand adapted for the Gaelic language and later published in 1907 and 1916 with a later 1946 reprint. An English translation appeared in 2015. The American theologian B. B. Warfield once compared Cook's sermons to those of Archibald Alexander.

Born on the farm of Auchereoch in the Isle of Arran, he experienced Christian conversion during the revivals associated with Calvinism in the southern end of the island. His Caithness ministry in the bilingual missionary charge of Bruan-Berriedale also affected thousands of seasonal herring fishermen from the west Highlands and the Isle of Lewis, for whom he organised Gaelic services in Wick. In 1837 Cook moved to Inverness after a strong section of the East Church there left it to create a new 'North' charge in the town; they followed Cook into the Free Church of Scotland at the Disruption of 1843 but saw him leave for Daviot in 1844.

Archibald Cook was popular with the ordinary people who found him sympathetic and approachable. He himself paid tribute to the influence of his mentor in student days in Glasgow, Dr John Love of Anderston Chapel of Ease. Like Dr Love, Cook's preaching was seen as 'searching' (challenging) and 'experimental'(experience-focussed). Archibald's brother Finlay Cook was a minister in Achreny (Caithness), Cross (Isle of Lewis), Inverness and Reay (Caithness).
