= Moy Hall =

House south of Inverness, Scotland

Coordinates: 57.3892°N 4.0503°W

Moy Hall near the village of Moy, south of Inverness, is the home of the chiefs of the Clan Mackintosh, a Highland Scottish clan.

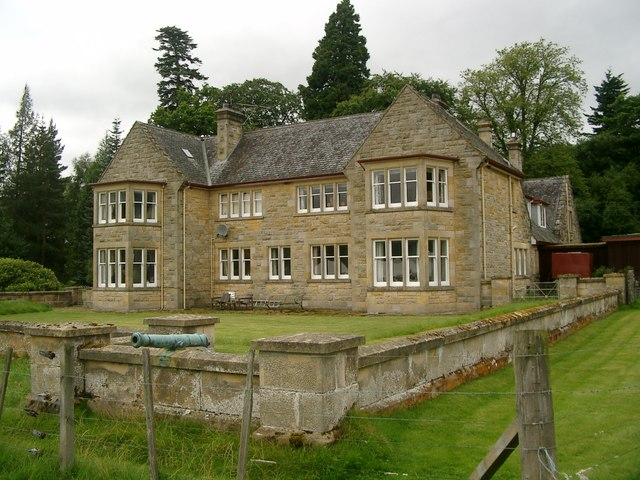
The current Moy Hall, built 1955-57

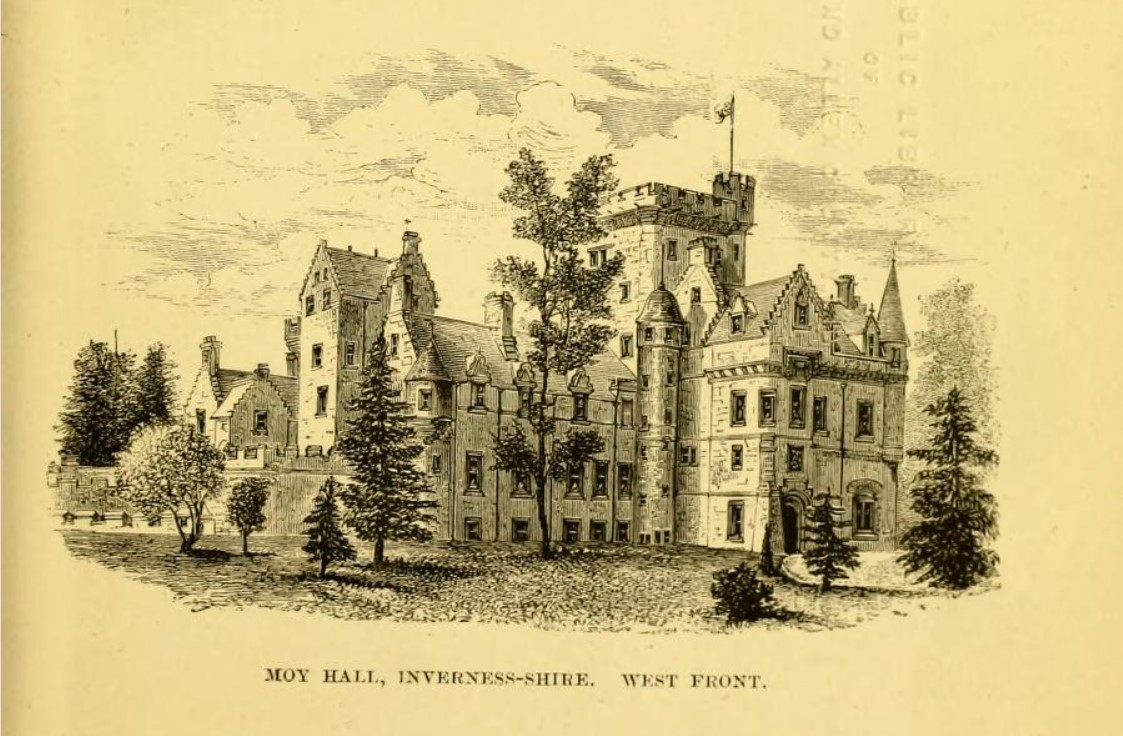
The Moy Hall built in about 1800, extended with tower and wings in about 1870 and demolished in the 1950s

== History ==
The original Moy Hall was built in about 1700 to replace Moy Castle which was on Moy Island on Loch Moy.

Jacobite supporter Lady Anne Farquharson-MacKintosh entertained Charles Edward Stuart here in February 1746. Lady MacKintosh learned that government forces were advancing to capture Stuart and she arranged for four of her men to hide by the roadside when the government troops approached. Setting off their pistols to fire one at a time, they shouted for Clan MacDonald and Clan Cameron to advance, thus tricking the government forces into thinking they had stumbled into the whole of the Jacobite Army. Government forces speedily retreated and the event is remembered as the "Rout of Moy".

The Moy Hall that was built in about 1700 was accidentally burned down in the time of Aneas Mackintosh, 23rd chief (died 1820). He had another Moy Hall built in about 1800 which was remodeled in the 1870s when the tower and two large wings were added. It was discovered to have dry rot, and despite remedial treatment was demolished in the 1950s. It was replaced with a much plainer house that was built 1955-57. The new Moy Hall, built nearby, is a somewhat smaller but comfortable home which retains various features from the old place, such as the wooden panelling.
