= Daviot, Highland =

Coordinates: 57.42659°N 4.12865°W

Daviot: Scottish Gaelic: Deimhidh
- Location within the Inverness area
- OS grid reference: NH722393
- Council area: Highland
- Country: Scotland
- Sovereign state: United Kingdom
- Post town: INVERNESS
- Postcode district: IV2
- Police: Scotland
- Fire: Scottish
- Ambulance: Scottish
- UK Parliament: Inverness, Skye and West Ross-shire
- Scottish Parliament: Inverness and Nairn

Daviot (Gaelic: Deimhidh) is a village in the Highland council area of Scotland. It is about 8 kilometres (5 mi) south east of the city of Inverness, next to the A9, the main road to Inverness.

== Etymology ==
The name Daviot was recorded as Deveth in 1206–33, and is Pictish origin. The root of the name is *dem, meaning "sure, strong", sharing a derivation with the Brittonic tribal name Demetæ (> Dyfed, Wales).

== Daviot Church ==
The current Daviot Church was built in 1826, and it located near a small hillock which is known as Cnoc an t’Saigart, or the ‘Priest’s Hillock’. The church building was substantially restored in 1991. Records show that there has been a place of worship upon that site since before a charter was granted in the 13th century. In 1618, Daviot parish was united to Dunlichty parish, which lies further south west.

On Sunday 30th July 2023, the Church closed. The area of the parish is now part of Strathnairn and Strathdearn Parish Church of Scotland.

Historically, the parish was within the Presbytery of Inverness and the Synod of Moray. There was formerly a Free Church about 4 miles south of Daviot, located near Farr.

== Daviot Railway Station ==
On the railway network, Daviot had its own railway station, which lay about a mile to the east of the main settlement of Daviot. It was opened on 19 July 1897 by the Highland Railway. It was the terminus of the line until Culloden Moor opened in 1898. The station closed on 3 May 1965. Today, only the platforms remain.

== Daviot Castle ==
Daviot Castle is located near Daviot House, about a mile north of the main settlement of Daviot, on the west bank of the River Ness. It was built in the beginning of the 15th century by David, Earl of Crawford. However, by the 19th century it was in ruins.

== Notable people ==
- Archibald Cook - Free Church of Scotland minister
- Alistair MacLean - novelist

== See also ==
- List of listed buildings in Daviot and Dunlichity
