= Daviot railway station =

Disused railway station in Daviot, Highland

Daviot

General information
- Location: Daviot, Highland; Scotland
- Coordinates: 57.4313°N 4.1061°W
- Grid reference: NH736398
- Platforms: 2

Other information
- Status: Disused

History
- Original company: Highland Railway
- Pre-grouping: Highland Railway
- Post-grouping: London, Midland and Scottish Railway; British Rail (Scottish Region)

Key dates
- 19 July 1897: Opened
- 3 May 1965: Closed
Location

Daviot railway station served the village of Daviot, Highland, Scotland, from 1897 to 1965 on the Inverness and Aviemore Direct Railway.

== History ==
The station was opened on 19 July 1897 by the Highland Railway. It was the terminus of the line until Culloden Moor opened in 1898. On the northbound platform was the station building and to the southwest was the goods yard. There were two signal boxes: one to the north which was built, but never opened. The other signal box was to the south, between the goods sidings. It was relocated slightly to the north in 1952. The station closed on 3 May 1965. The signal box closed in 1969. Only the platforms remain.

Preceding station	Historical railways	Following station
Moy; Line open, station closed	Inverness and Aviemore Direct Railway	Culloden Moor; Line open, station closed
