= Inverness Trunk Road Link =

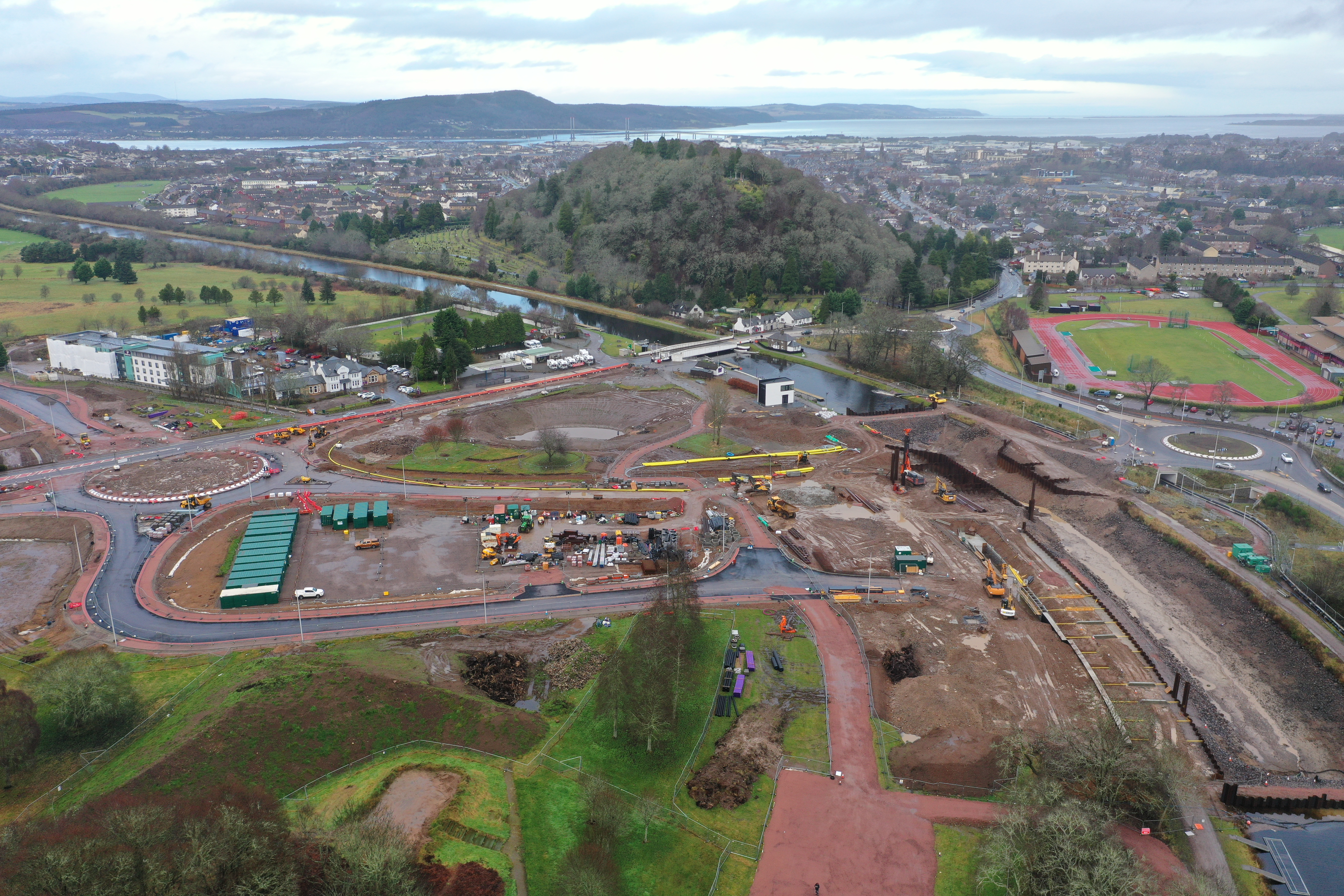
The West Section under construction in 2020

The Inverness West Link Project is a finished project in the city of Inverness with its aim of linking A9, A82 and A96 together, construction of a crossings of the Caledonian Canal and the River Ness in the Torvean area, southwest of the city.

The bypass, known as the Inverness Trunk Road Link (TRL), is aimed at resolving Inverness’s transport problems and has been split into two separate projects, the east and west sections. Also proposed is the upgrade of the existing B8082 Southern Distributor Road to dual 2-lane carriageway or single 4-lane carriageway, that will connect the two sections together.

== East Section ==
The east section will bypass Inshes Roundabout, and accommodate proposals for new development at the West Seafield Retail and Business Park and also a new Inverness Campus, which houses Inverness College UHI's main campus together with "An Lochran" which is jointly occupied by HIE and UHI Executive Office.

== West Section ==
At the west end, two options for crossing the River Ness and Caledonian Canal were developed. One involving a high level vertical opening bridge which will allow the majority of canal traffic to pass under without the need for opening. The other involved a bridge over the river and an aqueduct under the canal. Both of these designs are technically complex and were considered in detail along by the key stakeholders involved in the project. Ultimately it was decided that a bridge over the river and a tunnel under the canal were the best option, although more expensive. Following a public consultation, 8 route options were put forward for consideration by Highland Council from which one was chosen. This route passes through the canal park area of Inverness, and remains highly contentious. An Inverness Courier poll indicated that 85% of residents would choose an alternative route, most popularly one through Torvean Quarry.

This section is expected to be completed in 2021.

== Funding ==
In late 2008 the controversial decision by the Scottish Government not to include the full Inverness bypass in its transport plan for the next 20 years was made. The government's Strategic Transport Projects Review did however, include the eastern section of the route, which will see the A9 at Inshes linked to the A96.

But the absence of the TLR's western section, which would include a permanent crossing over the Caledonian Canal and River Ness, sparked dismay among several Highland councillors and business leaders in Inverness who feel the bypass is vital for the city's future economic growth.
