= Tomatin =

Coordinates: 57.33394°N 3.99170°W

Tomatin: Scottish Gaelic: Tom Aitinn
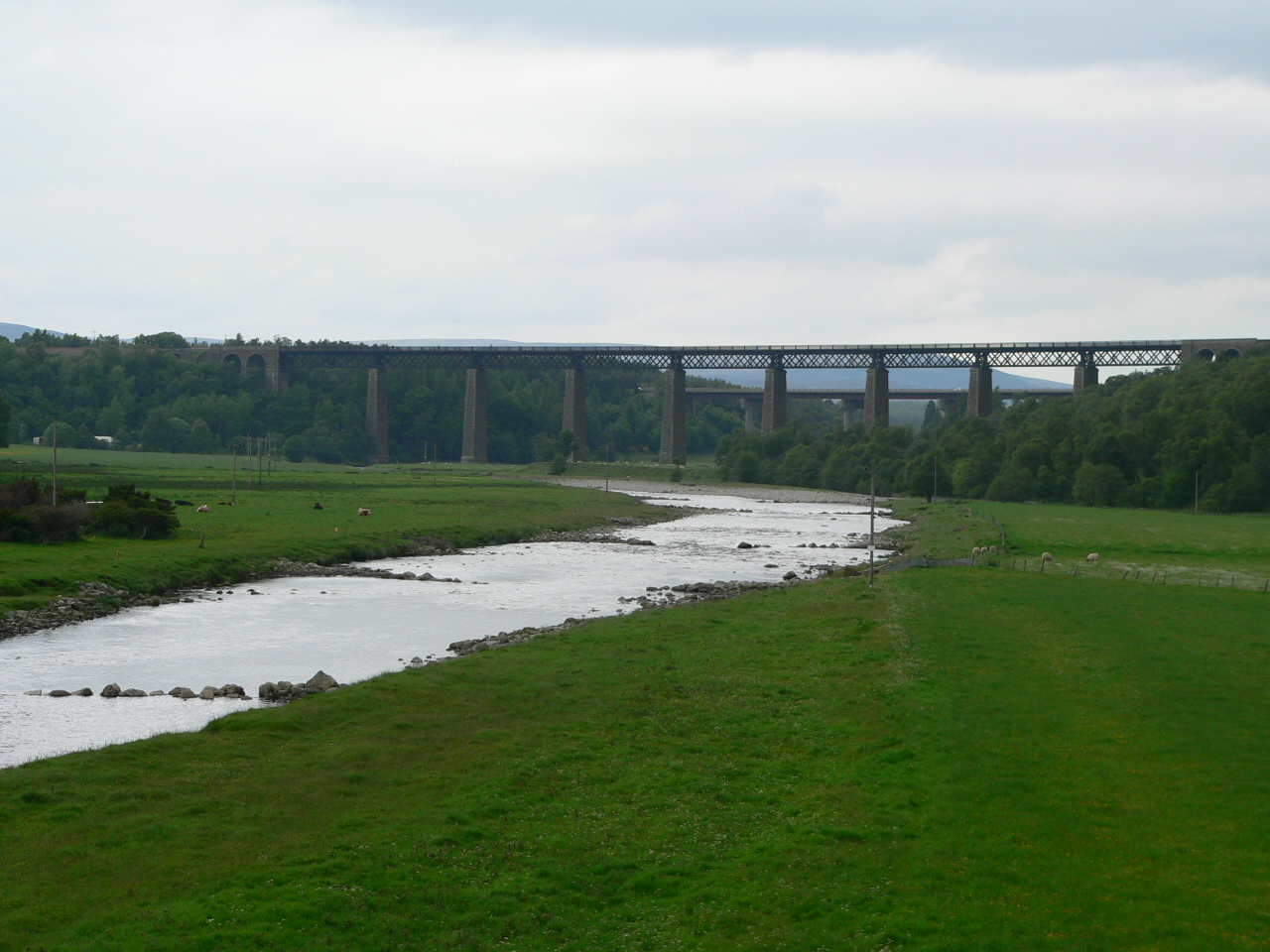
- The River Findhorn is crossed by the Highland Main Line and the A9 just east of Tomatin

- Location within the Inverness area
- Population: 183 (2001)
- OS grid reference: NH795297
  - Edinburgh: 100 mi (161 km)
  - London: 431 mi (694 km)
- Council area: Highland
- Lieutenancy area: Inverness
- Country: Scotland
- Sovereign state: United Kingdom
- Post town: INVERNESS
- Postcode district: IV13
- Dialling code: 01808
- Police: Scotland
- Fire: Scottish
- Ambulance: Scottish
- UK Parliament: Moray West, Nairn and Strathspey
- Scottish Parliament: Inverness and Nairn

Tomatin (/toʊˈmætɪn/; Scottish Gaelic: Tom Aitinn) is a small village on the River Findhorn in Strathdearn in the Scottish Highlands, about 16 miles (26 km) southeast of the city of Inverness. The name derives from the Scottish Gaelic name Tom Aitinn (hill of juniper). The river Findhorn rises at Coignafearn, a large game estate near Tomatin, and then passes through Tomatin village itself. The village has a shop, school and village hall and is most known for its whisky distillery.

At the 2001 census, Tomatin had a population of 183. Many of the inhabitants are employed by local farms and estates, while others commute to Inverness and surrounding towns.

Tomatin has been bypassed by the A9 since 1976.

== The Tomatin Distillery ==
Tomatin is perhaps best known for being the home of Tomatin whisky which, with its 23 stills, was the largest malt distillery in Scotland during the 1970s. Although it is thought that whisky has been distilled on the site since the 16th century, when cattle drovers would buy from a local still, the distillery was not established until 1897 under the name of Tomatin Spey Distillery Co Ltd. In 1986 it was taken over by Japanese conglomerate Takara Shuzo and was renamed The Tomatin Distillery Co Ltd. The number of stills has since been reduced to 12. The distillery was the first in Scotland to install a wood pellet boiler (2012).

== Local facilities ==
Facilities in the village include a general store, primary school and village hall that is used for a number of social activities. Local estates generate a significant income by attracting wealthy businessmen to take part in grouse shooting; the shooting season begins on 12 August of each year, which is known as the Glorious Twelfth.

The village was served by Tomatin railway station from 1897 to 1965.

In late 2010, the £185,000 Strathdearn Community Centre & Sports Facility was opened by local resident and shinty player, Kevin Thain.

== Tomatin United ==
Tomatin United plays in the Strathspey and Badenoch Welfare Football Association, playing its home matches at Raigbeg School. The team is made up of locals from 15 years and up. The team is well supported by the local community and receives sponsorship from a local business.
