= Ballinluig =

Coordinates: 56.653975°N 3.670209°W

Ballinluig: Scottish Gaelic: Baile an Luig
- Location within Perth and Kinross
- OS grid reference: NN977526
- Council area: Perth and Kinross
- Lieutenancy area: Perth and Kinross
- Country: Scotland
- Sovereign state: United Kingdom
- Post town: PITLOCHRY
- Postcode district: PH9
- Dialling code: 01796
- Police: Scotland
- Fire: Scottish
- Ambulance: Scottish
- UK Parliament: Angus and Perthshire Glens
- Scottish Parliament: Perthshire North

Ballinluig (Gaelic: Baile an Luig) is a village in Perth and Kinross, Scotland. It lies on the banks of the River Tummel in Logierait Parish, and is approximately 4 miles (6 kilometres) southeast of Pitlochry. It developed with the building of the Highland Railway, and sat where a branch line went off to Aberfeldy, both the branch line and Ballinluig station were closed in 1965.

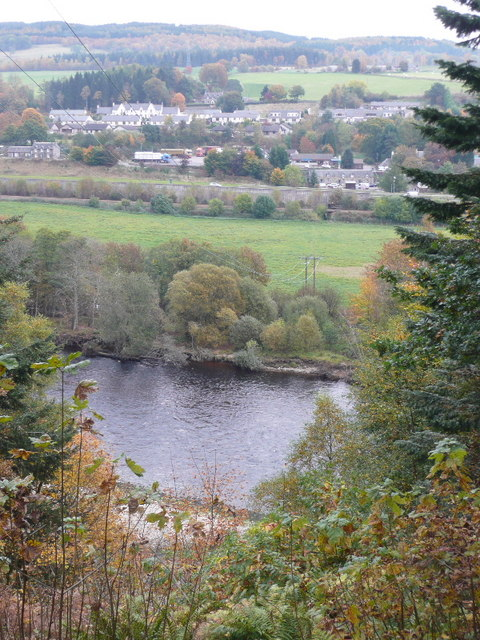
Ballinluig, across the River Tummel

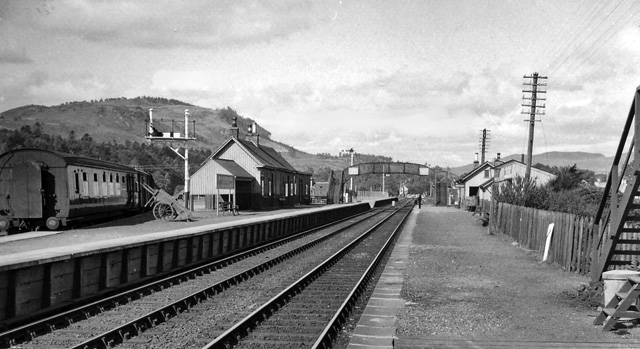
Until 1965 there was a station on the Highland Railway

== Demography and culture ==
=== Education ===
The village is home to Logierait Primary School which is a nursery and primary school. It has existed in Ballinluig since 1863 with the then rail station being located near it. It was designed by the Edinburgh architects R & R Dickson. A postcard released in 1905, captioned “The School and Schoolhouse, Ballinluig”, depicts the school buildings in Ballinluig.
