= Slochd Summit =

Summit in Highland, Scotland

Coordinates: 57°18′23″N 3°56′0″W

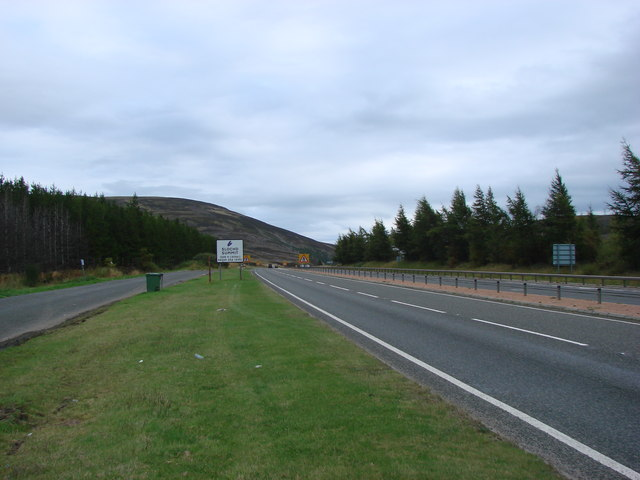
The A9 at Slochd Summit

The Slochd Summit (/slɒxk/; Scottish Gaelic: An Sloc) is a mountain pass on the A9 road and the Highland Main Line Railway in the Scottish Highlands between Inverness and Aviemore. An old military road also goes through the pass. National Cycle Network route 7 also goes over the summit, largely following the old A9.

Both the road and the railway have signs marking the spot - the A9 is at a height of 1,328 feet (405 m), while the railway reaches 1,315 feet (401 m). The Slochd Summit is the second highest place on the route from Inverness to Perth - the Pass of Drumochter at 1,500 feet (460 m) is higher and bleaker.

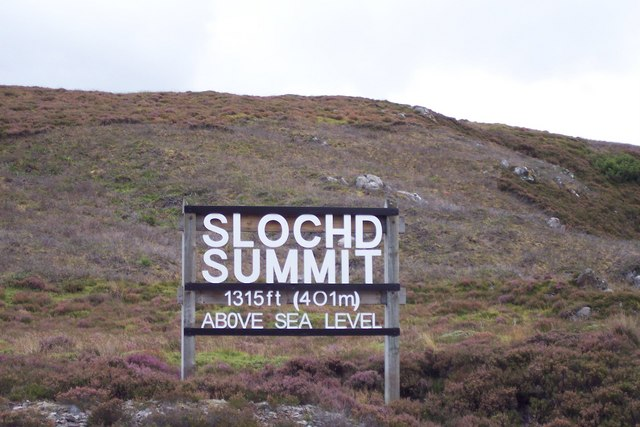
Sign next to the railway line
