= Inverness and Aviemore Direct Railway =

Railway line in Scotland

Overview
- Locale: Scotland
- Dates of operation: 8 July 1892–31 December 1922
- Successor: London Midland and Scottish Railway

Technical
- Track gauge: 1,435 mm (4 ft 8 1/2 in)

The Inverness and Aviemore Direct Railway was a section of railway built by the Highland Railway to provide a shorter and more direct route between Inverness and Aviemore, carrying its main line traffic to Perth and the south.

The line was constructed as a tactical measure to fend off incursions into the area by rival companies. It opened in 1898. The earlier route from Forres via Dava was retained, and for many years the Highland Railway and its successors operated both routes in parallel, but in 1965 the Dava route was closed.

The Inverness and Aviemore Line continues in operation at the present day, forming part of the Highland Main Line between Inverness and Perth.

== To the South from Inverness ==
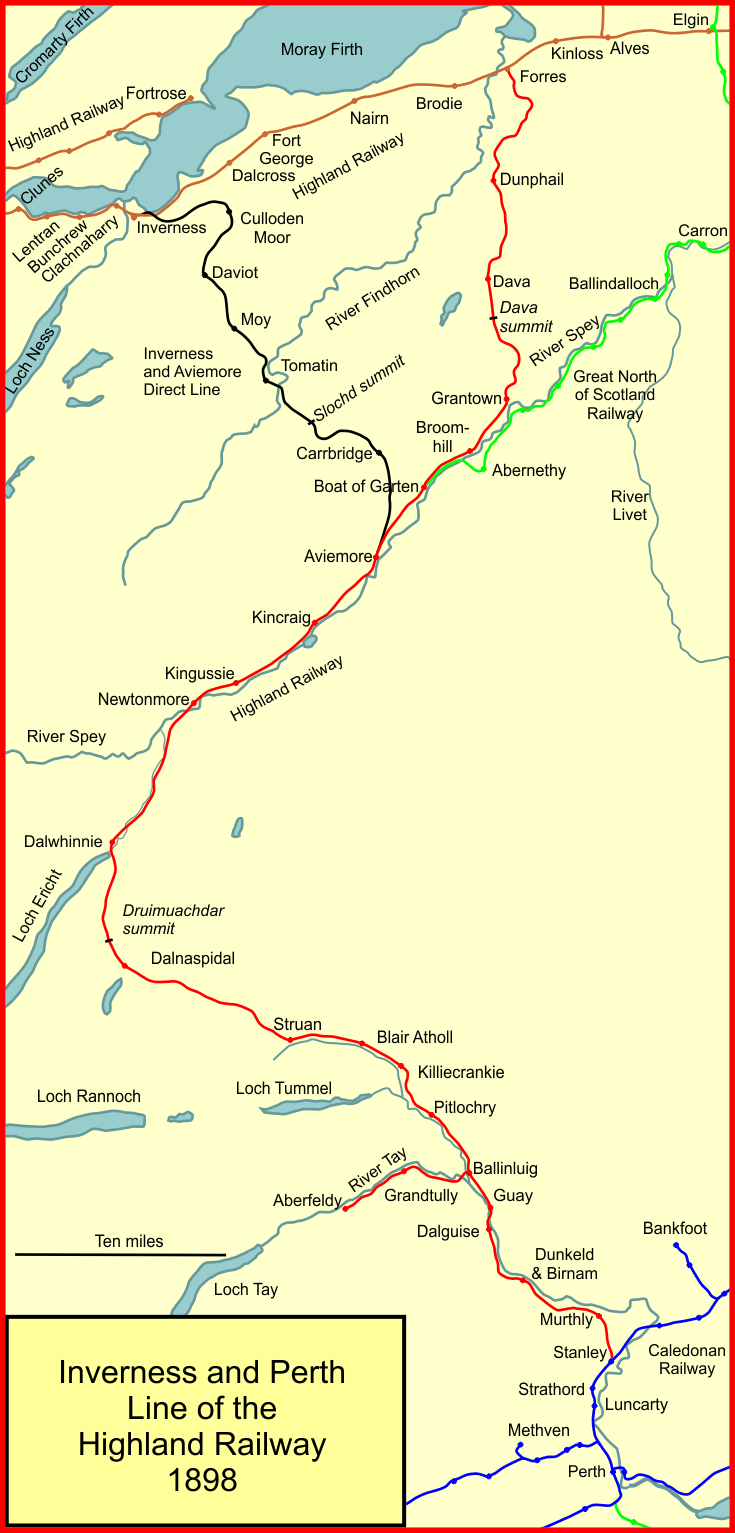
The Inverness to Perth line in 1898 showing the Carr Bridge deviation

Interests in Inverness had long wanted a railway connection to Central Scotland and the south. The Inverness and Aberdeen Junction Railway provided a route to Keith where the Great North of Scotland Railway connected to Aberdeen. This route became available in 1858. The co-operation of the Great North of Scotland Railway was less than perfect; and this, coupled with the circuitous route, and connectional difficulties at Aberdeen, made the arrangement very unsatisfactory to people in Inverness.

The Inverness people proposed a more direct route to the south, and this was authorised as the Inverness and Perth Junction Railway. It was routed southwards from Forres so as to provide a convenient connection for all the communities on the Inverness and Aberdeen Junction Railway: a route direct to Inverness would make the I&AJR a branch line, it was felt.

The I&PJR ran over wild and remote terrain as far as Aviemore, and then on to Dunkeld. From there trains used the Perth and Dunkeld Railway to Stanley Junction, and from there the Scottish North Eastern Railway to Perth. This was a considerable improvement over the Aberdeen route, although operation of the line over the mountainous route was difficult. The traffic from east of Forres proved to be lighter than anticipated, and at the same time traffic from Inverness and from the Inverness and Ross-shire Railway became increasingly dominant. The deviation to Forres before turning south was now a serious liability.

In addition it was clear that the Great North of Scotland Railway was planning its own independent line between Elgin and Inverness; at the same time the West Highland Railway was known to be considering a line along the Great Glen connecting from Fort William to Inverness. The Highland Railway was alarmed at both of these competitive encroachments into what it considered to be its own territory. It anticipated that Parliament would look favourably on them, if it could be shown that the Highland Railway was not taking adequate steps to improve its own line and its service to passengers and goods customers.

== A more direct route ==
The solution was a new line of 34 miles (55 km) running directly south from Inverness, rejoining the existing Perth line at Aviemore. This became the Inverness and Aviemore Direct Railway, informally known as the Carr Bridge line, or later the Carr Bridge line. Its authorising act of Parliament, the Highland Railway (New Lines) Act 1884 (47 & 48 Vict. c. clxxxiii), was passed on 28 July 1884.

The commercial impact of the new line was hardly positive for the Highland Railway. Acworth set out the issue in 1890:

No amount of genius can extract much sustenance for railways… from the barren hills of Perthshire or Inverness. The Highland must always mainly depend for a dividend upon its through traffic. And its through traffic it is forced to carry over a single line route so tortuous that, though the total distance from Wick to Perth, as the crow flies, is only 125 miles [201 km], the railway is 305 miles [491 km] in length. A year or two back, in order to keep out the Great North, it took powers for the construction of a new direct line from Aviemore to Inverness, cutting off the great elbow round by Forres and Nairn and so saving no less than 24 miles [39 km] of distance. Having got its powers, it did nothing towards making the line. But when the Great North announced their intention to apply for powers to Inverness, the Highland dared not wait longer.

It could never face a Parliamentary Committee and maintain that the existing facilities to Inverness were sufficient, when it had taken no steps to supply the additional accommodation whose necessity it had itself asserted only a few years before…

The construction of the new road will mean to [the Highland Railway], in the first place, a capital expenditure of some hundreds of thousands of pounds; secondly the cost of working some thirty additional miles [50 km]; thirdly no additional traffic whatever; and lastly, the reduction of the passenger fares by as many pence as the new road will be shorter in miles than the old.

== Construction delayed ==
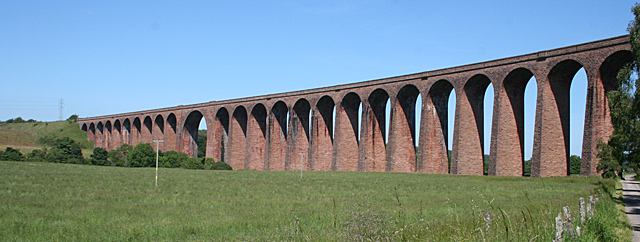
Strathnairn Viaduct near Culloden Moor; Scotland's longest railway viaduct; photo Anne Burgess

Having received the authorisation, the Highland Railway did nothing to hasten actual construction, no doubt believing that the danger of encroachment had been staved off. In any event, for the Highland Railway this was the most important development of the decade.

The cut-off was 34 1/2 miles (55.5 km) of new line between Aviemore and Inverness. For six years from obtaining the necessary act of Parliament on 28 July 1884, the company managed to stave off any real action, although by 1886 agreements about land acquisition were made with proprietors. Altogether four extensions of time to complete the line were granted: two before and two during construction.

== Opening ==
The Carr Bridge line was opened in stages: the first, from Aviemore to Carr Bridge, opened on 8 July 1892 as a branch line operated by a tank engine, and carrying very little traffic. The line from Carr Bridge to Daviot opened on 19 July 1897.

The route was completed for through running by the opening between Daviot and Millburn Junction, Inverness, on 1 November 1898. (Note: There is ambiguity about the dates; Aviemore to Carr Bridge is given as 8 July 1892 by Vallance (page 42 and page 177), Ross (page 104) and Sinclair (page 47). But Thomas and Turnock give 6 July 1892. Carr Bridge to Daviot is given as 8 July 1892 by Vallance (page 42 and page 177). The date for Carr Bridge to Daviot, 19 July 1897, is supported by Sinclair (page 47) and Quick (page 156, quoting a report in the Inverness Courier on 20 July); Thomas and Turnock (page 317) and Vallance (page 42 and page 177) give 8 July, possibly confusing the date with the Aviemore to Carr Bridge opening; Ross (page 105) gives 16 July; and in a footnote on page 239 Ross adds "Sir Francis Marindin inspected the section for the Board of Trade on 15 and 16 July. Vallance's date of 8 July seems incorrect." But the formality at the time was that the Inspecting Officer would report back to the Board of Trade, who would then issue the permission to open, so that opening on the same day as the actual inspection seems highly unlikely.)

In October 1897 it was decided to install double track on the as-yet unopened section between Inverness and Daviot. The decision involved widening some completed single-track bridges. Sinclair records:

The construction work was the greatest upheaval in the history of East Daltullich [where Sinclair lived as a child]. Not only was an embankment built a hundred yards from the farm, the local Smithy demolished, the public road diverted, and a new approach made to the farm under the railway, but new entrances had to be made to several of the fields. By 1897 the contract appeared finished, but then the HR decided to extend the double line from Culloden Moor to Daviot, and the bridge over the road to the farm had to be rebuilt from its single track formation before a train had run over it. The opening of the line to Inverness was delayed for a further year until the completion of the route’s major work, the Culloden Viaduct over the Nairn, whose construction had bankrupted its first contractor.

This section, from Inverness Millburn Junction to Daviot, and with it the entire route, opened on 1 November 1898.

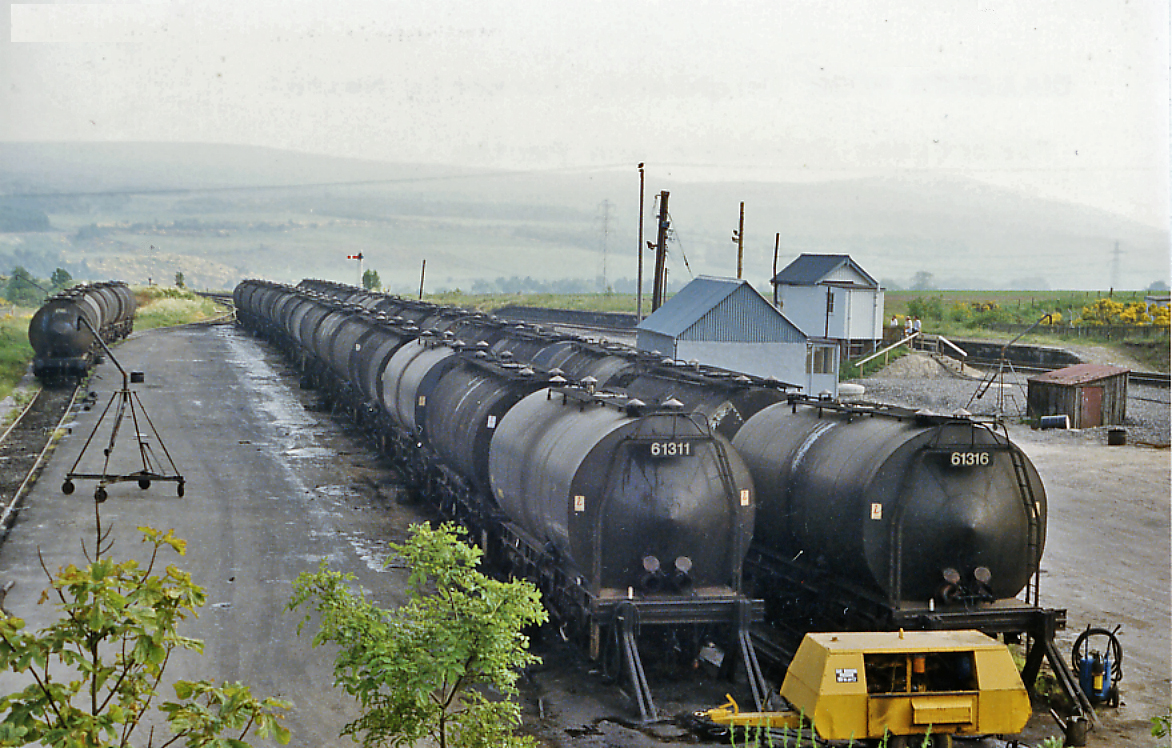
Culloden Moor Station, Highland Bitumen sidings and closed signal box.

The new line incorporated the Highland Railway’s second-highest summit: Slochd at 1,315 feet (401 m). The Strathnairn Viaduct near Culloden Moor is Scotland’s longest masonry viaduct at 600 yards (550 m) in length; there are 29 arches. Major enlargement of the track facilities was also carried out at Millburn Junction in Inverness. The total cost of the line was almost £1 million.

== Train services ==
The principal passenger trains were diverted to the Carr Bridge line, and the older route became a secondary main line.

Ross gives a detailed description of the train services with two main lines to Inverness:

From the opening of the direct line from Aviemore… the traffic planners had to cater for two main lines into Inverness from the south. In the summer of 1909, seven scheduled trains ran each day between Perth and Inverness. The night train from Perth left at 12.50 a.m., with sleeping car from Glasgow, and travelled via Carr Bridge, arriving at 5.10 a.m. A connecting train left Aviemore for Forres at 4.00 a.m., arriving also at 5.10 a.m. Nairn passengers went on to Inverness and changed trains there. At 5 a.m. another train left Perth, conveying sleeping cars from London and through carriages from southern railways, running via Carr Bridge and arriving at Inverness at 8.35 a.m. This ran only from 1 July to 11 August. Fifteen minutes later the 'normal' night train from London left Perth, and arrived in Inverness at 9.08 a.m. This train was also noted as conveying Sleeping Carriages Euston to Strathpeffer…

A Forres connection left Aviemore at 8.25 a.m., arriving at 9.35 a.m. The Mail left Perth at 6.15 a.m. and reached Aviemore at 8.33 a.m. Here it divided, the direct Inverness portion arriving at 10.10 a.m., and the Grantown portion arriving in Inverness at 11.15 a.m. A Saturdays-only train left Perth at 9.25 a.m., reaching Inverness at 1.50 p.m.; its Forres connection left Aviemore at 12.45, arriving 1.56 p.m. A train for Inverness via Forres still left Perth at 11.50 a.m., running non-stop to Newtonmore, which it reached at 1.44 p.m.; Forres was reached at 3.25, and Inverness at 4.15. Only ten minutes later, the old Parliamentary left Perth, stopping at all stations (five on request only) and reaching Inverness via Carr Bridge at 4:36 p.m.…

== Later developments ==
As part of the Highland Railway, the line became part of the London, Midland and Scottish Railway in 1923 upon the Grouping of the railways under the Railways Act 1921. The line became part of British Railways Scottish Region on railway nationalisation in 1948.

In the 1960s many local stations nationwide were closed, and here on 3 May 1965 Culloden Moor, Daviot, Moy and Tomatin stations closed. Carr Bridge was the sole intermediate station continuing in passenger use.

== Locations ==
- Inverness, Millburn Junction;
- Culloden Moor; opened 1 November 1898; closed 3 May 1965;
- Daviot; opened 19 July 1897; closed 3 May 1965;
- Moy; opened 19 July 1897; closed 3 May 1965;
- Tomatin; opened 19 July 1897; closed 3 May 1965;
- Slochd summit; 1,315 feet;
- Carrbridge; opened 8 July 1892; still open. At first usually spelt Carr Bridge; altered to one word 16 May 1983, although the one-word spelling had been used internally since 1899;
- Aviemore; opened 3 August 1863, on original Inverness and Perth Junction Railway; still open.

== Current operations ==
The line is open as part of the Highland Main Line, and passenger trains are operated by ScotRail.
