= Tourism in Scotland =

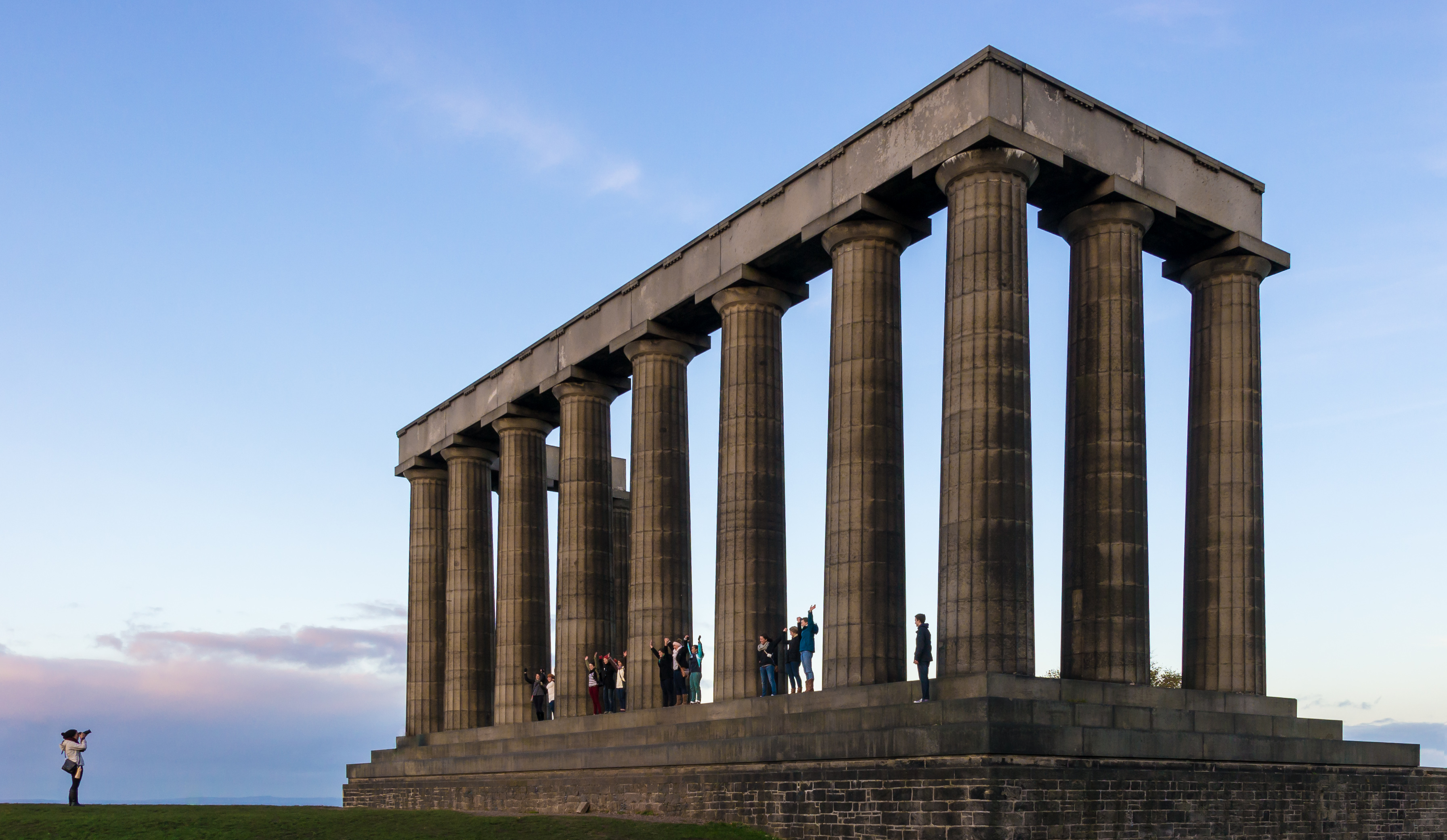
Tourists posing in front of the National Monument of Scotland in Edinburgh

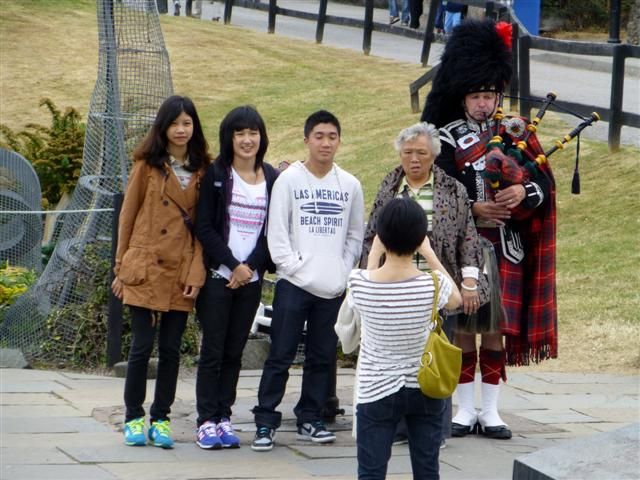
Tourists from Japan posing with a bagpiper in Fort Augustus

Scotland is a well-developed tourist destination, with tourism generally being responsible for sustaining 200,000 jobs mainly in the service sector, with tourist spending averaging at £4bn per year. In 2002, for example, UK visitors made 18.5 million visits to Scotland, staying 64.5 million nights and spending £3.7bn. In contrast, overseas residents made 1.58 million visits to Scotland, staying 15 million nights and spending £806m. In terms of overseas visitors, those from the United States made up 24% of visits to Scotland, with the United States being the largest source of overseas visitors, and Germany (9%), France (8%), Canada (7%) and Australia (6%), following behind.

Scotland is generally seen as a destination with beautiful scenery combined with thousands of historic sites and attractions. These include prehistoric stone circles, standing stones and burial chambers, and various Bronze Age, Iron Age and Stone Age remains. There are many historic castles, houses, and battlegrounds, ruins and museums. Many people are drawn by the culture of Scotland.

The main tourist season is generally from April to October. Summer sees busier roads and crowded ferries, while winter brings unpredictable weather and challenging conditions, especially in mountainous areas. In addition to these factors, the national tourist agency, VisitScotland, have deployed a strategy of niche marketing, aimed at exploiting, amongst other things, Scotland's strengths in golf, fishing and food and drink tourism.

== Statistics ==
Most visitors (for any purpose) to Scotland in 2018 came from the following countries:

| Rank | Country | Number |
|---|---|---|
| 1 | United States | 492,000 |
| 2 | Germany | 451,000 |
| 3 | France | 318,000 |
| 4 | Italy | 268,000 |
| 5 | Spain | 205,000 |
| 6 | Australia | 172,000 |
| 7 | Netherlands | 172,000 |
| 8 | Canada | 131,000 |
| 9 | Sweden | 121,000 |
| 10 | Norway | 106,000 |
| | Rest of the World | 1,102,000 |
| | Total overseas tourist visits | 3,538,000 |

== Tourist destinations ==
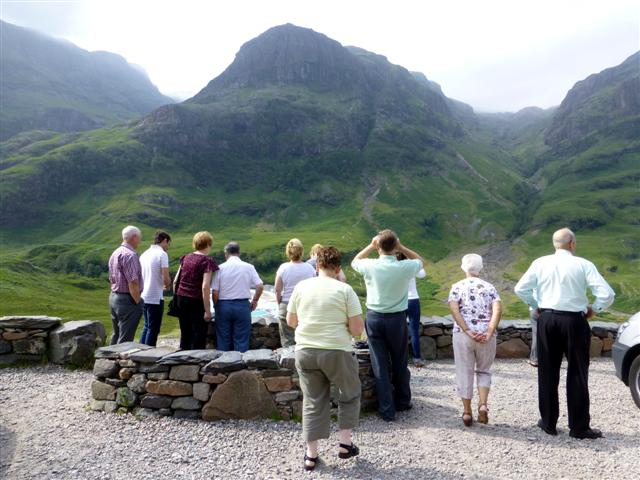
Tourists gather for photographs at Glen Coe

- Edinburgh is the capital city. The Old and New Towns of the city constitute a UNESCO World Heritage Site. Edinburgh is the largest tourist destination in Scotland, and the second largest in the United Kingdom after London. The cities' major tourist attractions include Edinburgh Castle, Edinburgh Zoo, Royal Botanic garden, the Palace of Holyroodhouse, Our Dynamic Earth and the Royal Mile. It has four universities including the University of Edinburgh founded in 1583. Edinburgh hosts cultural Fringe Festival and Royal Edinburgh Military Tatoo.
- Glasgow is the largest city in the country, and the second largest tourist destination after Edinburgh. Its attractions include the Burrell Collection, Glasgow Cathedral, the Glasgow Science Centre, Glasgow Transport Museum and the Kelvingrove Museum. In addition tourists come to Glasgow for its renowned Victorian architecture and Gothic architecture as well as its shopping. The city has three universities, including the University of Glasgow founded in 1451, and is a UNESCO City of Music which hosts the world renowned Royal Conservatoire of Scotland and Royal Scottish National Orchestra. Glasgow is host to many cultural festivals, including Glasgow international film festival and Celtic Connections trad music festival.
- Stirling is a historic city in central Scotland, 30 miles to the north-west of Edinburgh, and is generally known as the "Gateway to the Highlands", due to its geographical position between highland and lowland Scotland. Amongst its attractions are Stirling Castle, the Wallace National Monument and the Thieves Pot/Thistles Centre.
- Aberdeen is known as the "Granite City" and is renowned for its gothic architecture. The notable attractions include: Aberdeen Art gallery, Maritime Museum, Aberdeen Science Centre and Marischal Museum of anthropology. Aberdeen is a city of approximately 210,000 people and serves as the main administrative centre for the north-east of Scotland. With its large port and harbour, Aberdeen serves as the departure point for the ferries that connect the Scottish mainland with the Northern Isles of Orkney and Shetland. Aberdeen has two universities, and a large student population.
- St Andrews is a small, but busy town in north-east Fife. The royal burgh's economy is centred on the golf industry, with St Andrews being regarded as the home of the modern game, explored in its Museum of Golf. The University of St Andrews (the oldest in Scotland) has colleges located throughout the town and a small museum on the history of the University which is open to the public free of charge.
- Dundee is known as the "City of Discovery" and is the home of V&A Dundee, Scotland's first and only design museum. Dundee is home to Scott of the Antarctic's ship the RRS Discovery. Dundee has two universities. It has a Jute museum called Verdant Works, an Anchor Point of ERIH – The European Route of Industrial Heritage.
- Perth is a small but historic city on the east coast, which stands on the River Tay. Perth is known for its abundant parkland. Notable places are Perth Art Gallery and Perth Concert Hall. Close by is the village of Scone, ancient capital of Scotland and former home to Scottish kings.
- Inverness is the administrative centre for the Highlands, close to Loch Ness and serves as a transport hub for much of the Highlands, with rail and bus services departing here to much of the northern and west Highlands. It is a popular destination for tourists wishing to explore the north of Scotland. Famous Inverness Castle bears a historical connection to Mary Queen of Scots.
- Ayrshire offers wonderful scenery, outdoor activities, enthralling history with links to William Wallace, Robert the Bruce and Scotland's best known poet, Robert Burns. Ayrshire offers some of the finest golf courses in the world (32 in total). North Ayrshire hosts Kelburn Castle which is famous for its Graffiti Project.
Popular tourist destinations and attractions in Scotland
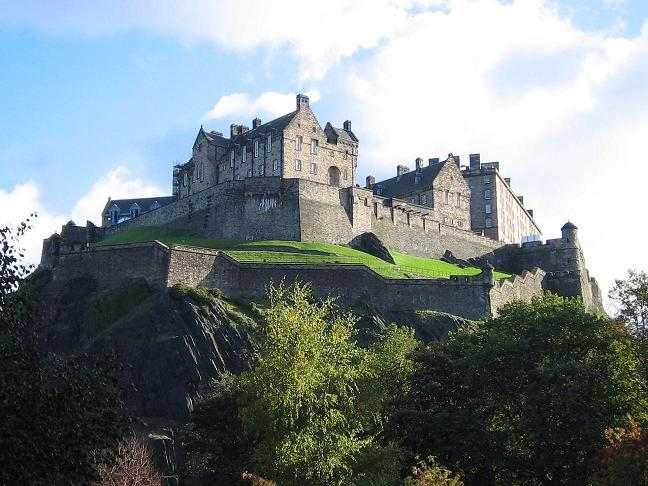
Edinburgh Castle

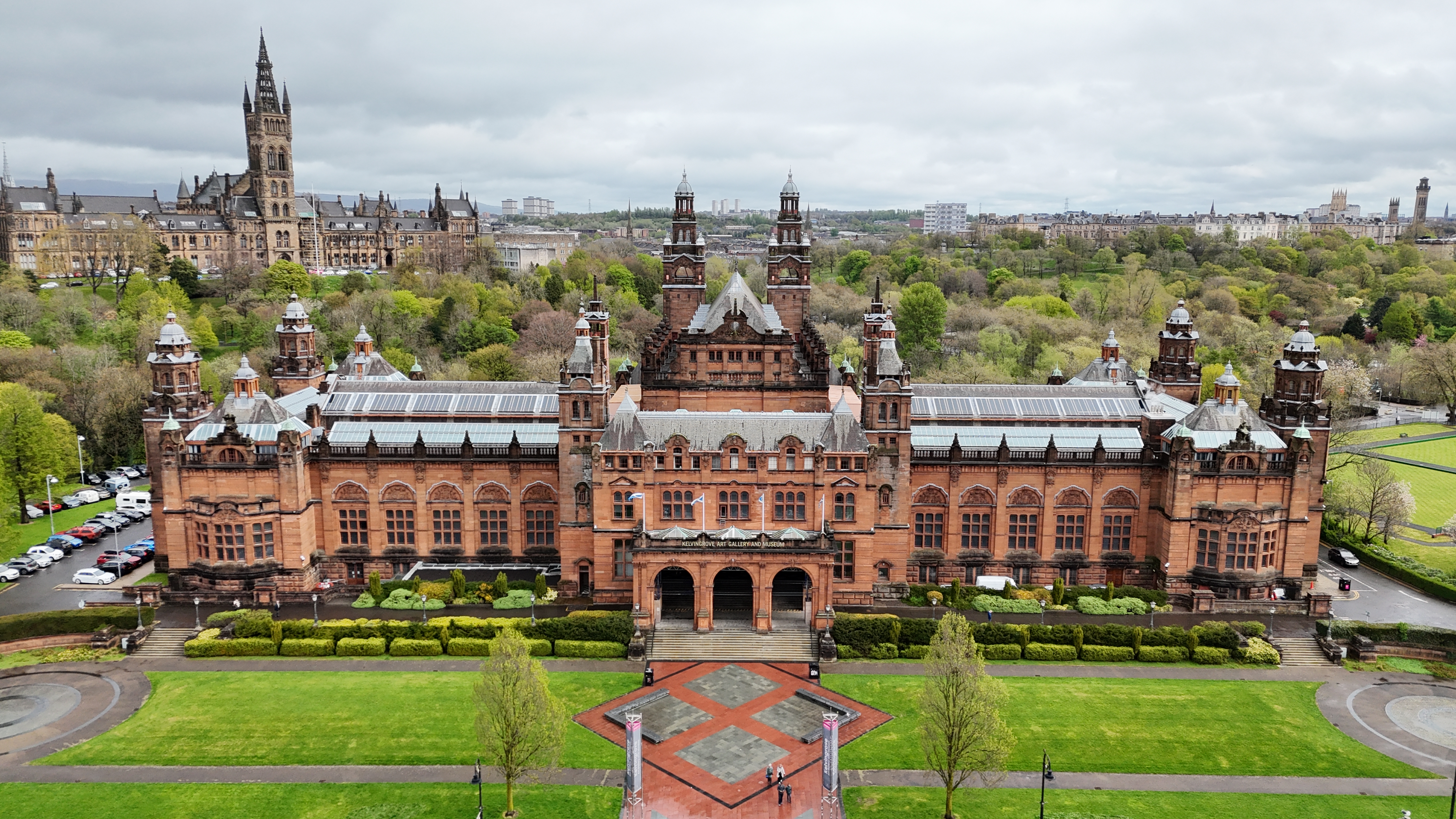
Kelvingrove Art Gallery and Museum

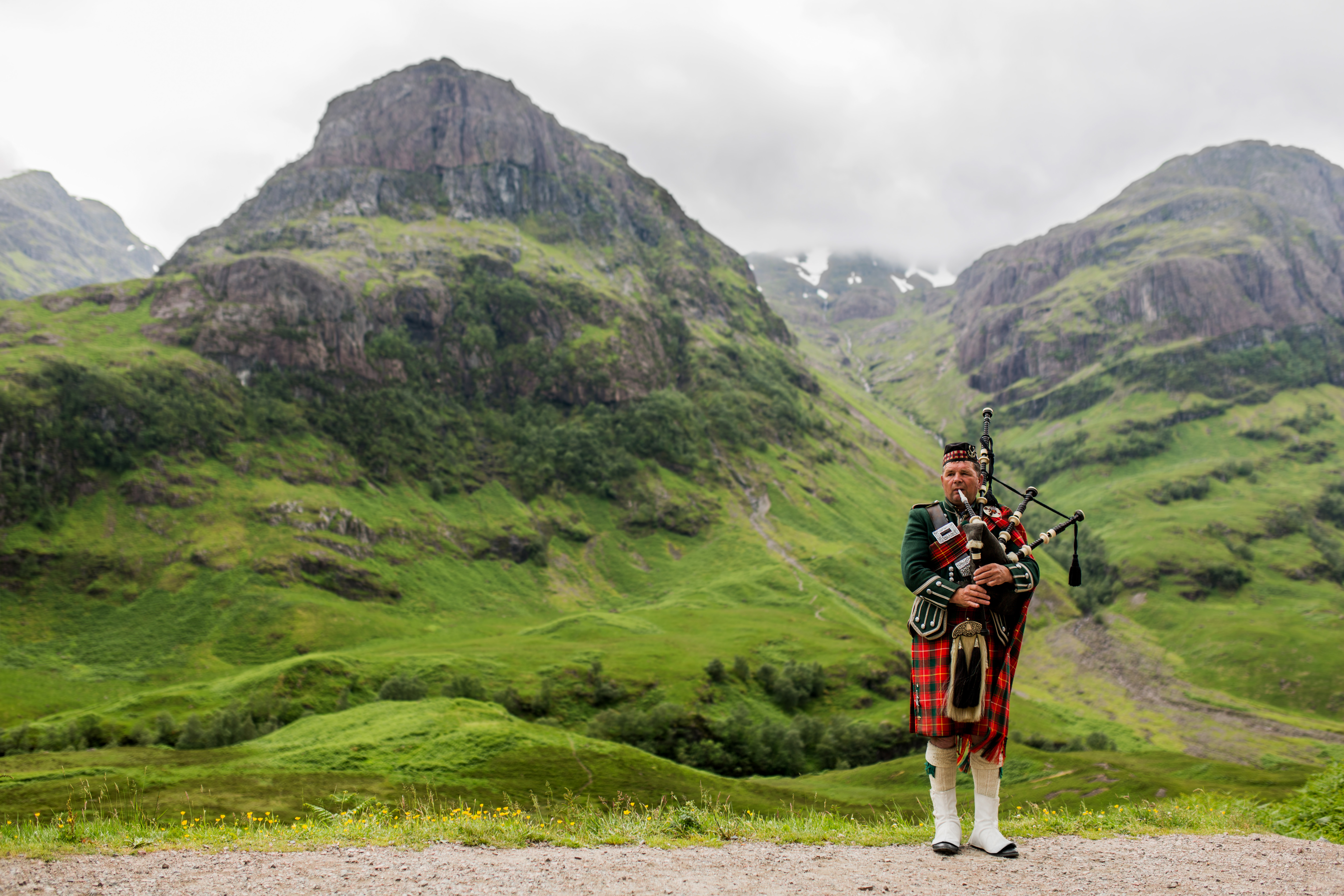
Scottish Highlands

=== Attractions ===
==== Top paid attractions ====
| Rank | Attraction | Number |
|---|---|---|
| 1 | Edinburgh Castle | 1,981,152 |
| 2 | Stirling Castle | 594,938 |
| 3 | Edinburgh Bus Tours | 563,568 |
| 4 | Edinburgh Zoo | 531,557 |
| 5 | Urquhart Castle | 473,814 |
| 6 | Culloden Visitor Centre | 374,443 |
| 7 | The Royal Yacht Britannia | 332,635 |
| 8 | Camera Obscura and World of Illusions | 331,881 |
| 9 | Glasgow Science Centre | 330,536 |
| 10 | Newhailes | 304,111 |
| | Total number of visits to paid attractions | 17,849,139 (2023) |
| | Increase in 2024 | 2.4% |

==== Top free attractions ====
| Rank | Attraction | Number |
|---|---|---|
| 1 | National Museum of Scotland | 2,314,974 |
| 2 | National Gallery of Scotland | 1,999,196 |
| 3 | St Giles' Cathedral | 1,742,147 |
| 4 | Riverside Museum | 1,273,395 |
| 5 | Kelvingrove Art Gallery and Museum | 1,172,226 |
| 6 | Loch Lomond | 1,099,738 |
| 7 | Royal Botanic Garden Edinburgh | 1,041,767 |
| 8 | National War Museum | 756,200 |
| 9 | The Burrell Collection | 555,888 |
| 10 | Glenfinnan Monument | 546,377 |
| | Total number of visits to paid attractions | 31,859,344 (2023) |
| | Increase in 2024 | 4.8% |

== Areas of Interest ==
Other areas which are popular for tourists include the Highlands and the Hebrides, such as the Isle of Skye. Perthshire, the Scottish Borders and Orkney and Shetland are popular tourism destinations.

Ben Nevis is the highest mountain in the United Kingdom, but there are many other significant mountains in Scotland, albeit relatively small by international standards. The Cuillin on the Isle of Skye offer challenging climbs such as the Inaccessible Pinnacle. Ben Lomond on the shores of Loch Lomond is closest to Glasgow.

Scotland has amusement parks such as M&D's in the town of Motherwell, North Lanarkshire, Landmark Forest Adventure Park at Carrbridge in the Highlands. Scotland’s first inland surf resort near Edinburgh has opened in 2024. Scotland’s International Climbing indoor arena is also located nearby at Ratho. Ski centres are located in Cairngorms and Pentland Hills.

Scotland has many lochs, including Loch Lomond, and Loch Ness, home of the mythical Loch Ness monster. Rivers such as the Spey, Tay, Tweed, and Aberdeenshire Dee are famous for salmon and fly fishing. Scotland is a popular destination for hunting, especially deer and grouse.

Scotland's best known export is Scotch Whisky and numerous visitors a year enjoy a tour around its Whisky distilleries. The Highlands is by far the largest region in Scotland both in area and in whisky production. This massive area has over 30 distilleries on the mainland. When the Islands sub-region is included, the total number of distilleries is 47. The nearby Speyside area has the largest number of distilleries including Aberlour, Balvenie, Cardhu, Cragganmore, Dalwhinnie, Glenfarclas, Glenglassaugh, Glenfiddich, Speyburn, The Macallan, The Glenlivet, and The Glenrothes. Urban centres like Edinburgh offers access to Port of Leith Distillery and Johnny Walker Whiskey experience. Distilleries are the third most visited attractions in Scotland; roughly 2 million visits were recorded in 2018. 68 distilleries operate visitors' centres in Scotland and another eight accept visits by appointment. The tourism has had an especially visible impact on the economy in some remote rural areas.

Scotland is the home of golf, with historic and famous courses including St Andrews, Gleneagles, Royal Troon, Carnoustie, and Muirfield. There are hundreds of other courses in the country.

== Effects of the COVID-19 pandemic ==
Like all of the UK, Scotland was negatively impacted by the restrictions and lockdowns necessitated by the worldwide COVID-19 pandemic. Tourism has particularly suffered. In October 2020, the Scottish Tourism Alliance made this comment: "The devastating impact of this pandemic will make recovery incredibly challenging, if not questionable, without the assurance of continued targeted support from both the Scottish and UK Governments". The First Minister acknowledged the setbacks that the hospitality/tourism sector had already experienced in a March 2021 speech when she announced financial support for the industry. "It's been an incredibly difficult year for all businesses" and added that she did not "underestimate the acute challenges our tourism and hospitality sectors have faced".

Most reports that provide statistics on the impact of the pandemic on tourism cover the entire UK as an entity rather than specifically for Scotland. VisitBritain in April 2021, stated that the travel restrictions and lockdowns in the UK led to a 76% reduction in "inbound tourism" to the UK in 2020 and forecast for 2021 indicated an estimated that visits would be up "21% on 2020 but only 29% of the 2019 level". An increase in visits was expected but slowly at first and the report concluded that tourism was not expected to come "even close to normal levels".

The VisitBritain report in April 2021 discussed the effects of the pandemic on domestic within the UK in 2020, citing a significant reduction in spending, for an estimated decline of 62% over the previous year. As of January 2021, the forecast for 2021 suggested that spending would increase by 79% over the previous year and that "the value of spending will be back to 84% of 2019 levels" by the end of 2021.

A report published in March 2021 by the Fraser of Allander Institute at the University of Strathclyde indicated that in the UK, "tourism and hospitality suffered notable losses from the pandemic" and provided detailed specifics for both domestic and international visits. This report reviewed the Scottish hospitality industry in great detail; the situation was not yet optimistic at that time, with "no sign of a trend reversal with more than 70% of businesses in the sector reporting lower turnover than usual".

The Scottish Tourism Alliance Task Force published its recommendations in October 2020, with "Immediate Actions" for both the Scottish government and the UK government. The group particularly requested support for the tourism/hospitality industry, including financial grants, the funding of marketing for the sector, and a "temporary removal of Air Passenger Duty to boost route competitiveness". On 24 March 2021, First Minister Nicola Sturgeon announced a £25 million tourism recovery programme "to support the industry for the next 6 months to two years". Sturgeon reminded the hospitality/tourism industry that the government had provided "over £129 million" in support "for this sector".

On 5 April 2021, the BBC published specifics about domestic tourism in the UK indicating that the restrictions were to be loosened during that month, at least for domestic travel within Scotland, Wales and England. Travel within mainland Scotland was expected to be permitted again starting on 26 April. A survey in March 2021 indicated that roughly 70% of the 500 Scots surveyed were hoping to "have a holiday at home this year". The BBC recommended such "staycationing" but reminded readers that travel to "Scotland's islands or across the border at Gretna and Berwick" might not be possible for some time.

The VisitBritain website discussed the UK's "COVID-19 restrictions" that were expected to be loosened in April but indicated that there was no confirmation as to whether the rules on international travel, either inbound or outbound, would actually be loosened in mid-May.

It was possible that the UK's plan to loosen restrictions on inbound tourists would not commence as early as planned. On 8 April 2021 sources in the European Union stated that a "third wave of the pandemic [was sweeping] the continent". (Two days earlier, PM Boris Johnson had made it clear that "We don't want to see the virus being reimported into this country from abroad".) Of particular concern was the B117 variant, a mutation of the virus, "which [was] spreading rapidly in at least 27 European countries".

Travel restrictions were loosened in England on 12 April 2021, but not in Scotland. Some lockdown measures were expected to be relaxed on 26 April. It was hoped that domestic travel would again be allowed and that cafes and restaurants would be permitted to re-open at least their outdoor facilities, as in England.

== See also ==
- Golf in Scotland
- VisitScotland
- Museums in Scotland
- Scotch whisky
- Scottish topics
- Common Travel Area
- Tourism in England
- Tourism in Wales
- Wild Scotland
- Most visited museums in the United Kingdom

== Sources ==
- "The Scotch Whisky Regulations 2009: Guidance for Producers and Bottlers" (PDF). Scotch Whisky Association. 2 December 2009. Archived from the original (PDF) on 23 June 2017.
