= Bob Moore (executive) =

Founder of Bob's Red Mill (1929–2024)

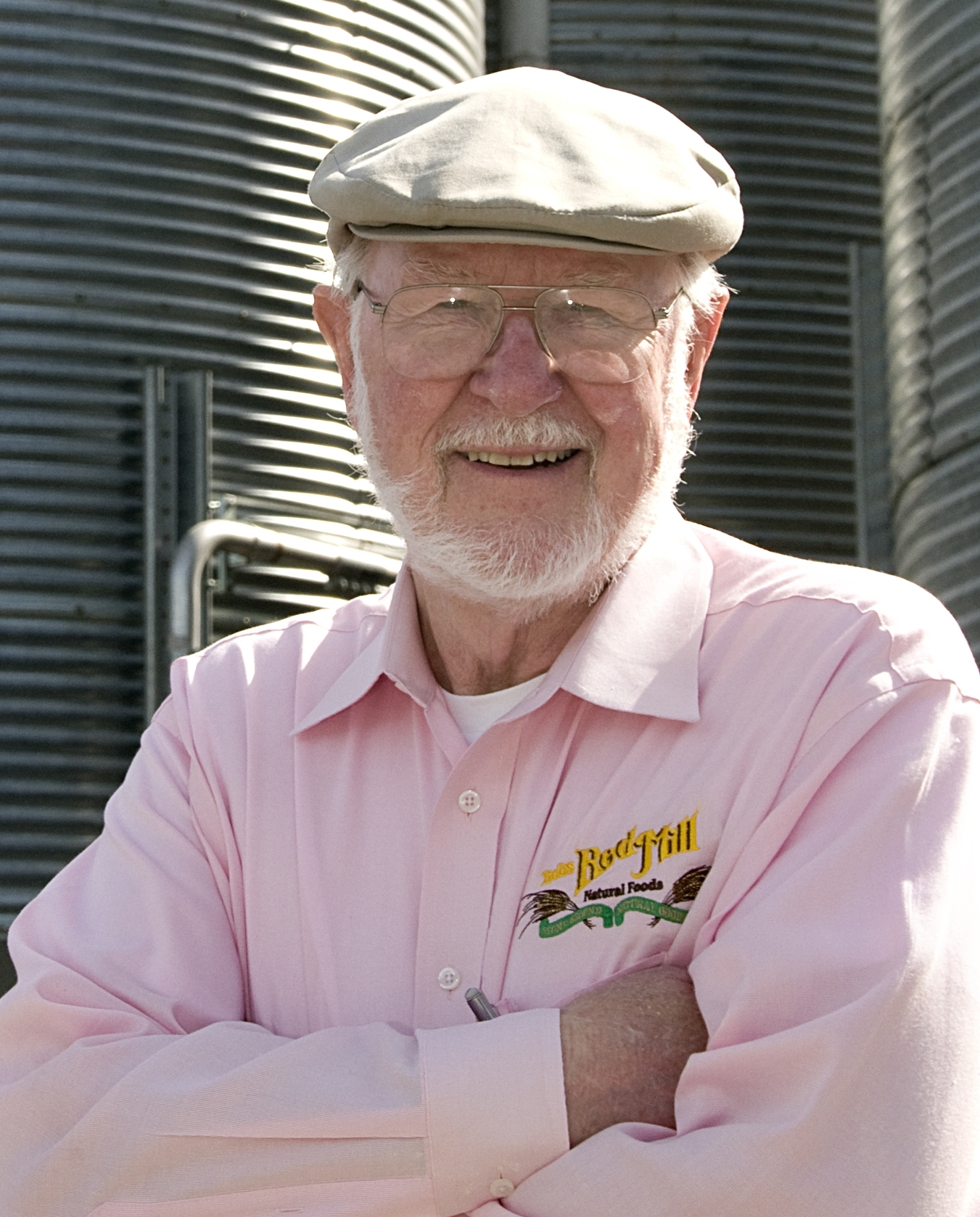
- Moore in 2012
- Born: Robert Gene Moore; February 15, 1929; Portland, Oregon, U.S.
- Died: February 10, 2024 (aged 94); Milwaukie, Oregon, U.S.
- Resting place: Lincoln Memorial Park, Portland, Oregon, U.S.
- Occupations: Cofounder and board member of Bob's Red Mill
- Spouse: Charlee Coote (m. 1953; died 2018)
- Children: 3

Robert Gene Moore (February 15, 1929 – February 10, 2024) was an American food executive and philanthropist. He and his wife Charlee founded Bob's Red Mill, a brand of whole-grain foods and baking products, in 1978. Known for his white beard, red vest, bolo tie, and flat cap, an illustration of Moore's face is found on all of the company's products, alongside the salutation "To Your Good Health".

Born in Portland, Oregon, and raised in San Bernardino, California, he had a number of jobs throughout his life, including serving in the United States Army, owning a pair of gas stations, and working at JCPenney. He discovered his passion for whole-grain milling in the mid-1960s, when he started up Moore's Flour Mill in Redding, California, in 1974. After briefly retiring to learn to read the Bible in its original languages, Charlee and Bob ended up opening up another flour mill in Milwaukie, Oregon, that became Bob's Red Mill. The company grew to $100 million in revenue by 2010, at which point he transitioned the company to an employee stock ownership plan based on his religious convictions. He retired as CEO in 2018, remaining a board member until his death in 2024 at age 94.

== Early life and education ==
Robert Gene Moore was born in Portland, Oregon, on February 15, 1929, to Ken and Doris Moore. He had a younger sister named Jeannie. He was raised in San Bernardino, California. During his youth, his father had a job driving a Wonder Bread truck.

Moore graduated from high school and then served in the United States Army for three years, building roads and bridges on Enewetak Atoll in the Marshall Islands.

== Career ==
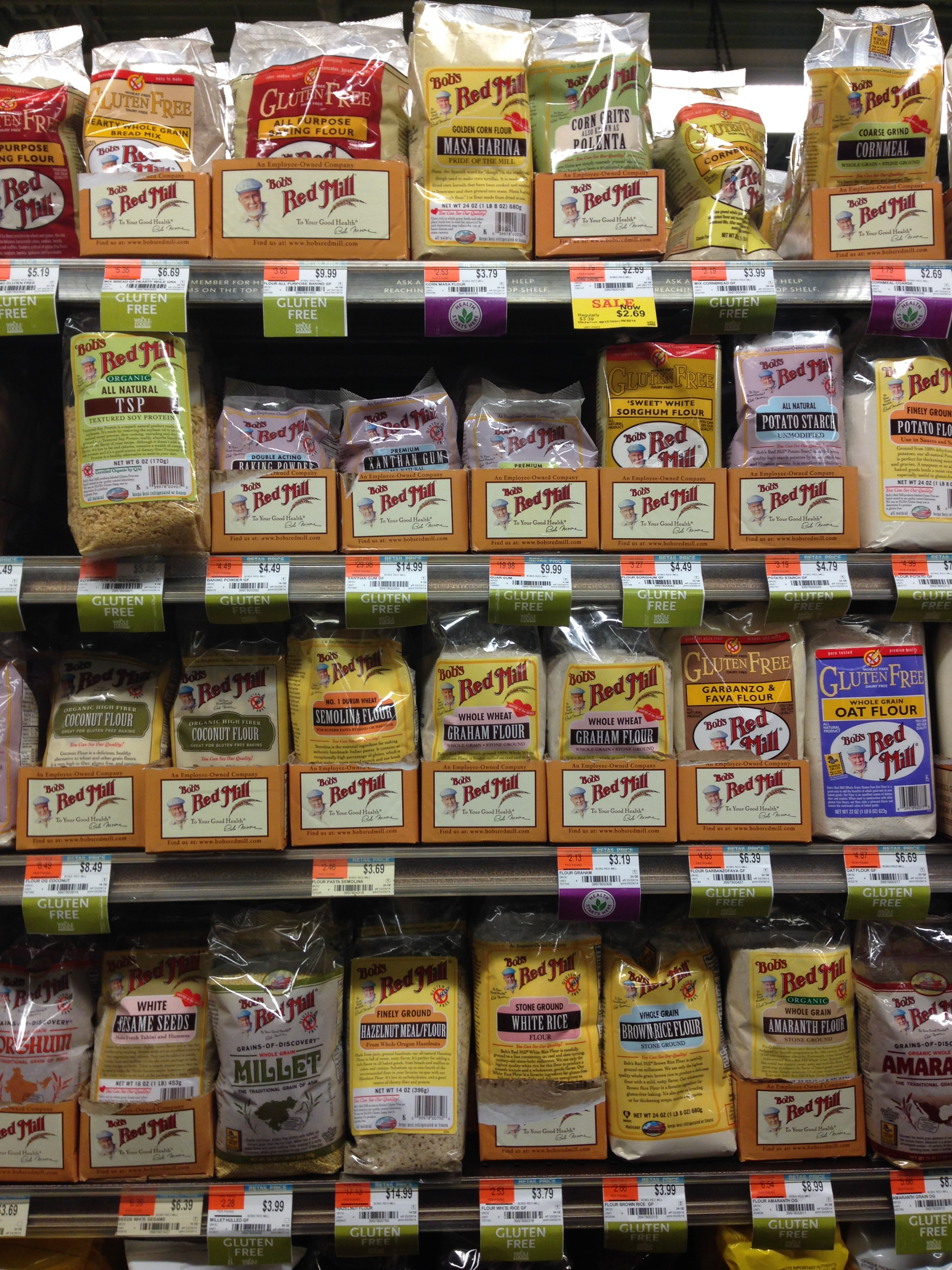
Bob's Red Mill products on grocery store shelves

After the Army, Moore worked as an electronics technician at U.S. Electrical Motors Company, where he met his eventual wife Charlee Lucille Coote. He later managed gas stations in Gardena and Mammoth Lakes, California. After those failed, he moved with his wife to Sacramento, where he worked at Sears. By the mid-1940s, Moore had moved to Redding, California, where he managed a JCPenney auto shop.

Moore's drive for healthier foods started with his father's death of a heart attack at age 49, and his grandmother's healthy eating obsession. He began experimenting with stone-ground flours in the mid-1960s after reading John Goffe's Mill by George Woodbury, a book about an archeologist who rebuilt a flour mill and went into business with no prior experience.

Bob, Charlee, and two of their sons, Bob Jr. and Ken, opened Moore's Flour Mill in Redding, California, in 1974. The business was located in a vacant Quonset hut. Following a desire to read the Bible in its original languages, they left the business to their children to study at Western Evangelical Seminary, a seminary school in Oregon. They originally intended this to be their retirement. Soon after moving though, the couple came upon an old feed mill that was set to be torn down. They founded Bob's Red Mill Natural Foods in 1978 in the old feed mill in Milwaukie, Oregon. An illustration of Moore, who was described as a "folksy, almost Santa-like figure who often donned a red vest or coat" by The Washington Post, is found on all of the company's products, alongside the salutation "To Your Good Health". The use of Moore’s image on the company’s products occurred a few years after the company was started when a friend suggested that Moore himself should appear on the packaging.

In 1988, the mill was torched by an arsonist. The company reopened in 1989, growing to national distribution and, in 2000, international distribution. Bob's Red Mill grew to $100 million in revenue by 2010, with business expanding globally. Moore transitioned the company of then 209 workers to an employee stock ownership plan that year. By April 2020, the company was entirely owned by its more than 700 employees. Moore described his plan for employee ownership and profit-sharing as rooted in his Christian belief that "The Bible says to do unto others as you would have them do unto you."

In 2016, at the age of 87, Moore competed for the Golden Spurtle in Scotland's World Porridge Making Championship. The Golden Spurtle, named for the specialized utensil made to stir porridge, is awarded annually to the person able to make the best traditional porridge, using only oatmeal, water, and salt. The 23rd annual competition was judged blind by two trained chefs and two professional crime writers. Moore took home the Golden Spurtle, besting seventeen other contestants in the traditional porridge category.

Moore retired as CEO in 2018, remaining a board member at Bob's Red Mill until his death.

== Philanthropy ==
In 2011, the Moores donated $5 million to Oregon State University to develop a center to study whole grains called the Moore Family Center for Whole Grain Foods, Nutrition, and Preventive Health. Their donation also helped establish the Charlee Moore Institute for Nutrition & Wellness at Oregon Health & Science University.

== Personal life ==
In 1953, Moore married Charlee Lucille Coote, with whom he had three sons: Ken, Bob Jr., and David. She died in October 2018. Moore died at his home in Milwaukie, Oregon, on February 10, 2024, five days before his 95th birthday. He had nine grandchildren and six great-grandchildren at the time of his death.

Moore was a Christian. He was known for his white beard, red vest, bolo tie, flat cap, and playing the piano.
