= EICA =

EICA may refer to:

- Electrical Instrumentation Control Automation Engineering
- Connemara Airport in Ireland
- Edinburgh International Climbing Arena, indoor climbing arena near Edinburgh
