= Carrbridge =

Village in Badenoch and Strathspey, Scotland

Coordinates: 57.282°N 3.816°W

Carrbridge: Scottish Gaelic: Drochaid Chàrr
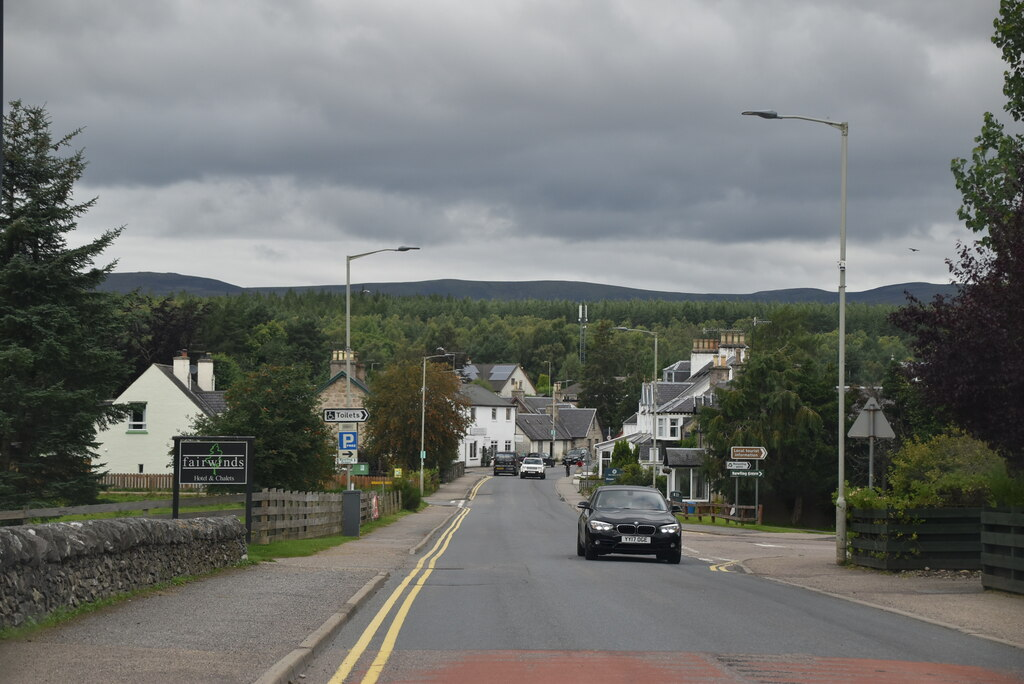

- Location within the Badenoch and Strathspey area
- Population: 708
- OS grid reference: NH905225
  - Edinburgh: 95 mi (153 km)
  - London: 425 mi (684 km)
- Council area: Highland
- Lieutenancy area: Inverness
- Country: Scotland
- Sovereign state: United Kingdom
- Post town: CARRBRIDGE
- Postcode district: PH23
- Dialling code: 01479
- Police: Scotland
- Fire: Scottish
- Ambulance: Scottish
- UK Parliament: Moray West, Nairn and Strathspey
- Scottish Parliament: Inverness and Nairn

Carrbridge (Scottish Gaelic: Drochaid Chàrr) is a village in Badenoch and Strathspey in the Scottish Highlands. It lies on the River Dulnain, off the A9 road, five miles (8 km) north of Aviemore and eight miles (13 km) west of Grantown-on-Spey. It has the oldest stone bridge in the Highlands. The nearby ancient pine forest contains the Landmark Forest Adventure Park.

== Geography ==
Carrbridge lies near Aviemore and forms a gateway to the Cairngorms National Park. It was an early centre for skiing in Scotland. In the 2001 census the village had a population of 708 people, with the majority employed in tourism.

Until the construction of a bypass in the 1980s, the A9 ran straight through the village. Carrbridge is served by Carrbridge railway station on the Highland Main Line.

The name Carrbridge is a partial translation of the Gaelic Drochaid Chàrr(a), meaning "bridge of the rock ledge".

== Attractions ==
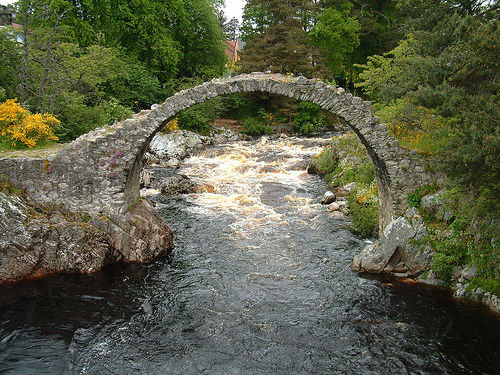
Remains of the old bridge of 1717

Carrbridge's most famous landmark is the old Carrbridge Packhorse Bridge, from which the village is named. The bridge, built in 1717, is the oldest stone bridge in the Highlands. It was severely damaged in the "muckle spate" of 1829 which left it in the condition seen today. In 1847 someone wrote to the Inverness Courier giving it as an example of one of the "all but deserted [bridges of which] the most useful and picturesque ought to be preserved". It is now unstable and is recommended only to be viewed from afar. Jumping off the bridge into the River Dulnain below had long been a popular pastime for younger locals and the more adventurous tourists.

Landmark Forest Adventure Park is set in an ancient pine forest at the south end of the village. It has a variety of attractions, including a wild water coaster, steam powered saw mill and the UK's first nature trail, Treetop Trail.

There has been a Boys' Brigade campsite in the village for many years.

Duthil Old Parish Church and Churchyard, located nearby, includes many graves and memorials of Clan Grant.

== Events ==
The village plays host to two popular annual competitions: the Golden Spurtle World Porridge Making Championship and the Carve Carrbridge Scottish Open Chainsaw Carving Competition. Both contests offer keen but friendly competition, drawing entrants and spectators from all over the world.

Throughout the year, many events are held by Carrbridge Community Arts, a dynamic and innovative local community group, which include Music, Art, Theatre, Celebrations and Festivals.

== In the news ==
In 2009 the village took on the BBC claiming that the Corporation constantly got the weather wrong which was putting off tourists. Local businesses claimed that BBC weather reports on television and on their website constantly reported rain despite there being no rain whatsoever. Locals stated that the BBC generalised the weather to "rain in Scotland". Carrbridge became a minor celebrity with the story appearing on national news networks and the quiz show Have I Got News for You.

== Sport ==
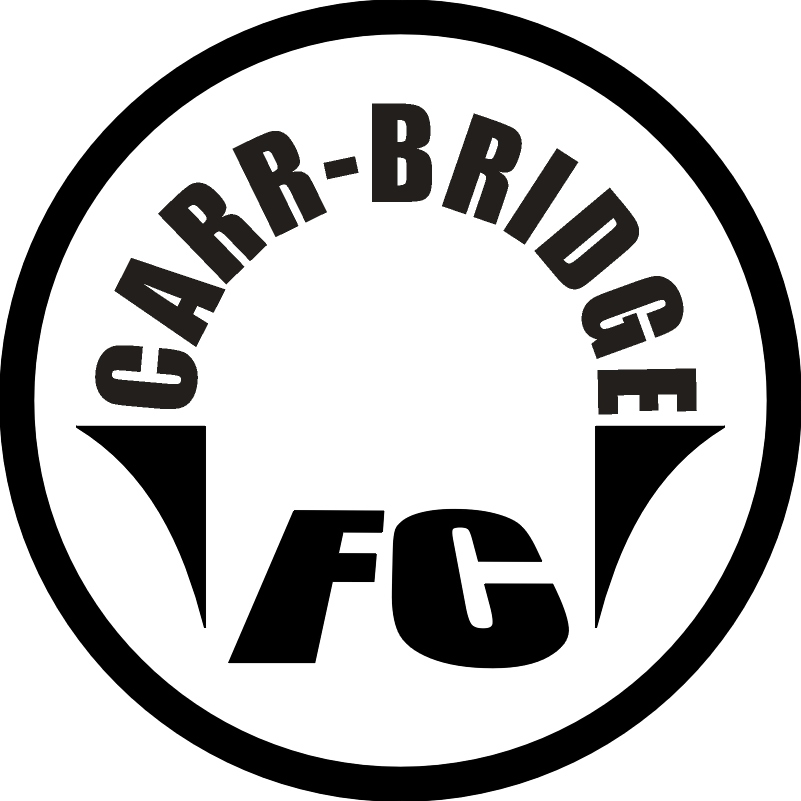
Carrbridge FC club badge

The village has its own association football team, Carrbridge FC, which plays in the Strathspey & Badenoch Welfare FA League and in local cup competitions. They won the League in 1986 and 2008, but were unable to field a team in 2009 and 2010. Their home ground is in the centre of the village (next to the main car park) and their home colours are black & white vertical stripes.

Golfers are catered for with a challenging nine-hole golf course. The village also has a pony trekking centre and a bowling green.

== Wildlife ==
The local pine forests are home to crossbills, crested tits, red squirrels and deer. Nearby areas provide summer habitats for common snipe, greenshanks, Eurasian oystercatchers, northern lapwings and others. On the nature trail in Landmark Forest Adventure Park, there is a special feeding area that attracts pine wood birds and the red squirrel—endangered in most of the country due to competition from the introduced grey squirrel. Around the area, there are rarely seen golden eagles on the mountains and peregrine falcons are more common. Ospreys fly to their summer home in Loch Garten and red deer are commonly seen.

== Notable people ==
- Blackmill, a dubstep musician
- Rachel Sermanni, a folk musician
