= World Porridge Making Championship =

Competition held in Scotland

- Website: http://www.goldenspurtle.com/

The World Porridge Making Championship has been running since 1994, giving a main prize of the "Golden Spurtle" trophy and the title "World Porridge Making Champion" for the best traditional porridge made with only oatmeal, water and salt. A prize is also awarded for the best "Speciality" porridge, which is also made with oatmeal but to which contenders can add their own ingredients. The competition takes place at the village hall in Carrbridge, in the Cairngorms National Park, Scotland. and is run by volunteers on behalf of the Carrbridge Community Council. It has taken place alongside World Porridge Day since 2009.

The 2023 contest had entrants from twenty countries. The winner, Adam Kiani, represented Pakistan and England.

In 2025, director Constantine Costi released The Golden Spurtle, a documentary film about the 2023 competition.

== Winners ==
Year	Golden Spurtle	Speciality	Notes
1994	Florence Ritchie	Ian Cruickshank	
1995	Florence Ritchie	Norman Brockie	
1996	Duncan Hilditch	Duncan Hilditch	
1997	Cancelled	Cancelled	
1998	Scott Chance	Duncan Hilditch	
1999	Scott Chance	Helen Fraser	
2000	Duncan Hilditch	Jean Dewar	
2001	Duncan Hilditch	Jean Dewar	
2002	Jean Dewar	Duncan Hilditch	
2003	Jean Dewar	Duncan Hilditch	
2004	Duncan Hilditch	Lynn Benge	
2005	Lynn Benge	Lara Smitch	
2006	Coleen Hayward MacLeod	Addy Daggert	
2007	Maria Soep	Al Beaton	
2008	Ian Bishop	Addy Daggert	
2009	Mathew Cox	Anna Louise Batchelor (also known as "Porridge Lady")	
2010	Neal Robertson	Catherine Caldwell	
2011	John Boa	Neal Robertson	
2012	Benedict Horsbrugh	Laurie Figone	A "People's Choice" award was also given, to John Boa.
2013	John Boa	Nick Barnard	
2014	Izhar Khan	Chris Young and Christina Conte	
2015	Simon Rookyard	Thorbjorn Kristensen	
2016	Bob Moore (of Bob's Red Mill)	Thorbjorn Kristensen	
2017	Ellinor Persson	Per Carlsson	
2018	Per Carlsson and Calle Myrsell (joint winners)	Chris Young	Junior winner: Lynn Munroe
2019	Lisa Williams	Nick Barnard	
2020		Chris Young	Virtual competition due to COVID-19 pandemic
2021		Miriam Groot	Virtual competition due to COVID-19 pandemic
2022	Lisa Williams	Chris Young	
2023	Adam Kiani	Bobby Fisher	
2024	Chris Ormiston	Kim McGhee	
2025	Sven Seljom	Caroline Velik	
2026	Gina Saarberg	Rob Reid	
