= Strathspey and Badenoch Welfare Football Association =

Sports governing body in Scotland

- Website: http://sbwfa.co.uk

The Strathspey & Badenoch Welfare Football Association is the governing body overseeing amateur Scottish Welfare football in the Badenoch and Strathspey area of Scotland. It is affiliated to Scottish Welfare Football Association and Scottish Football Association and has been running intermittently since its inaugural season in 1929–30. The winners on that occasion were the now-defunct Nethy Bridge F.C.

== Competitions ==
There is an annual league competition which runs from May to July with each member club playing the others four times over the course of the season. For the 2019 season, all league games take place on Tuesday evenings. The SBWFA League is sponsored by local Carrbridge firm David Ritchie & Sons Ltd. As of the 2017 season it has been known as the David Ritchie & Sons Ltd League for sponsorship purposes.

Each club is also responsible for hosting its own cup competition. As of the 2019 season cup matches will take place on Friday evenings, except for the SBWFA North V South Trophy which has yet to be confirmed. 2019 has five cup competitions. These are:

- McCook Cup (Aviemore Thistle)
- Revack Cup (Boat of Garten Ospreys)
- Maclean Cup (Grantown United)
- Capaldi Cup (Kingussie F.C.)
- SBWFA North V South Trophy

Because there were no league competitions in the 2020 and 2021 seasons, the cup matches were also suspended. The format for the 2022 season has not been announced yet.

== Clubs ==
Member club numbers tend to fluctuate from season to season, with the most recent notable extinctions being Grantown F.C. and Tomatin United. The 2022 season is being competed for by the following clubs:

- Aviemore Thistle

One of two sides based at the village of Aviemore, Thistle shared their home park with local rivals RBL Aviemore before RBL Aviemore were mothballed at the end of the 2015 season. Thistle underwent a rebirth at the end of 2007 when the club almost became extinct, but the name and colours were saved at the 11th hour and a Jags side was successfully fielded for the 2008 season.

- Boat of Garten Ospreys

The latest incarnation of Boat of Garten FC, making a return to the SBWFA after a long absence.

- Cromdale
- FC Abernethy
- Kingussie

The side return to the SBWFA after an absence of four years, last competing in the 2015 season when they finished third in the league table that season.

- Spey Valley Youth

== Previous league winners ==
The complete list of League winning clubs since the Association's inception is given below:

- 1929–30 Nethy Bridge
- 1930–31 Nethy Bridge
- 1932–33 Nethy Bridge
- 1933–34 Boat of Garten
- 1934–37 No competition
- 1938–39 Boat of Garten
- 1940–45 No competition
- 1946–47 Boat of Garten
- 1947–48 Kingussie F.C.
- 1948–49 Aviemore F.C.
- 1949–50 Aviemore F.C.
- 1950–51 Aviemore F.C.
- 1951–52 Aviemore F.C.
- 1952–53 Aviemore F.C.
- 1954 Aviemore F.C.
- 1955 REM (Royal Engineers)
- 1956 Nethy Bridge
- 1957 Nethy Bridge
- 1958 Nethy Bridge
- 1959 Kingussie F.C.
- 1960 Kingussie F.C.
- 1961 Kingussie F.C.
- 1962 Aviemore F.C.
- 1963 Aviemore F.C.
- 1964 Kingussie F.C.
- 1965 Kingussie F.C.
- 1966 Aviemore Thistle
- 1967 Kingussie F.C.
- 1968 Grantown F.C.
- 1969 Grantown F.C.
- 1970 Kingussie F.C.
- 1971 Carrbridge F.C.
- 1972–76 No competition
- 1977 Carrbridge F.C.
- 1978 Carrbridge F.C.
- 1979 Carrbridge F.C.
- 1980 Carrbridge F.C.
- 1981 Kingussie F.C.
- 1982 Grantown F.C.
- 1983 Newtonmore F.C.
- 1984 Coylum Bridge
- 1985 Grantown F.C.
- 1986 Grantown F.C.
- 1987 Kingussie F.C.
- 1988 Carrbridge F.C.
- 1989 Grantown United
- 1990 Grantown United
- 1991 Grantown United
- 1992 Grantown F.C.
- 1993 Coylum Bridge
- 1994 Coylum Bridge
- 1995 Kingussie F.C.
- 1996 Grantown United
- 1997 Aviemore United
- 1998 Grantown United
- 1999 Grantown United
- 2000 Kingussie F.C.
- 2001 Kingussie F.C.
- 2002 Kingussie F.C.
- 2003 Kingussie F.C.
- 2004 Cromdale F.C.
- 2005 Tomatin F.C.
- 2006 Aviemore Thistle
- 2007 Tomatin F.C.
- 2008 Carrbridge F.C.
- 2009 Royal British Legion Aviemore
- 2010 Strathspey Thistle Colts
- 2011 Kingussie F.C.
- 2012 Kingussie F.C.
- 2013 Strathspey Thistle Colts
- 2014 Grantown F.C.
- 2015 Grantown United
- 2016 Grantown United
- 2017 Grantown United
- 2018 Grantown F.C.
- 2019 Grantown United
- 2020 No Competition
- 2021 No Competition
- 2022 Boat of Garten Ospreys
- 2023 Aviemore Thistle
- 2024 Aviemore Thistle
- 2025 Badenoch United
- 2026 Badenoch United
