= Rachel Sermanni =

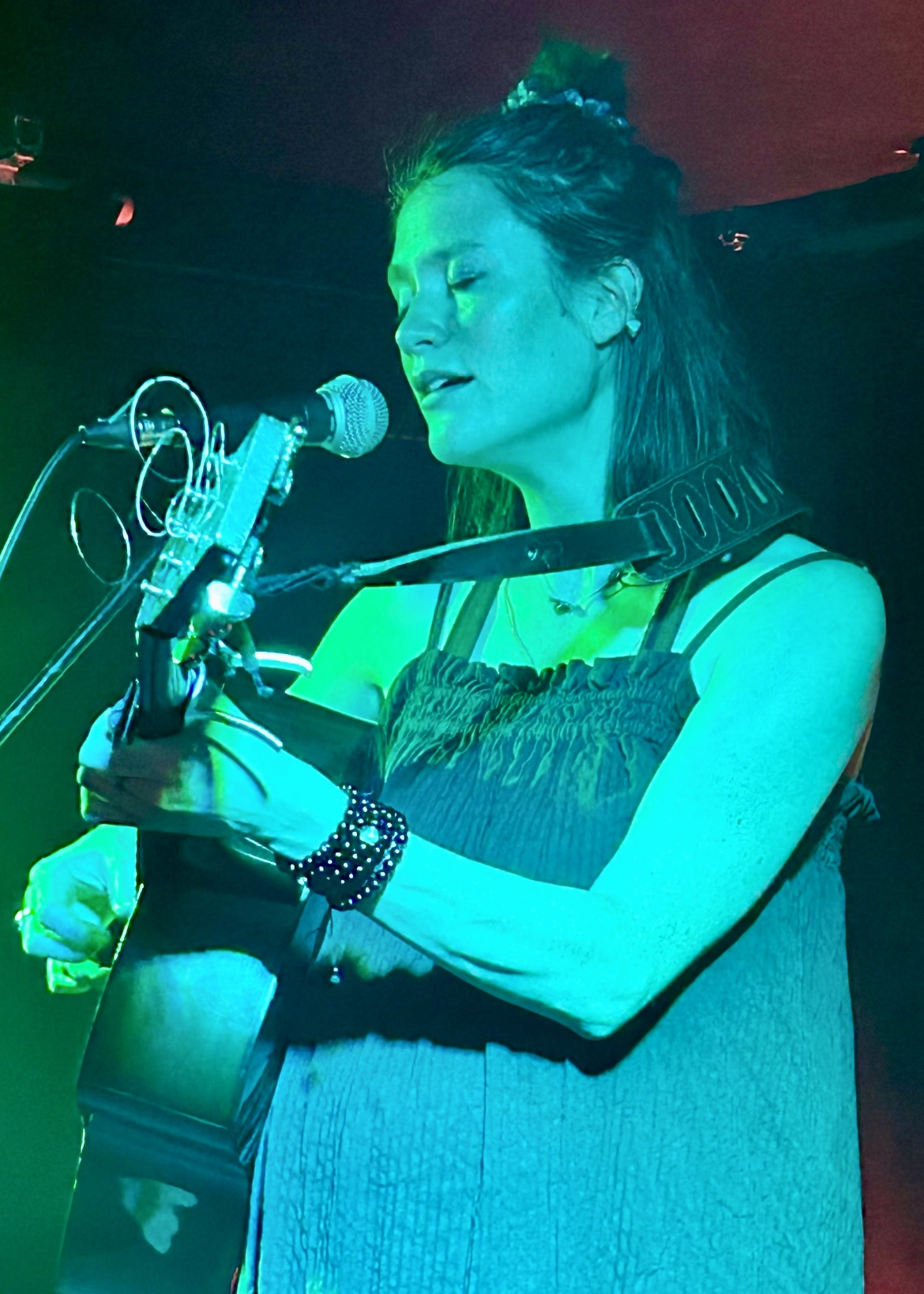
- Sermanni performing at Yes Basement in Manchester, England, 2023

Background information
- Born: 7 November 1991 (age 34)
- Origin: Carrbridge, Highland, Scotland
- Genres: Contemporary folk; indie folk; indie rock; Scottish folk; country
- Instruments: Vocals; guitar; mandolin
- Years active: 2010–present
- Labels: Jellygirl; Middle of Nowhere; Rough Trade; Navigator
- Website: rachelsermanni.com

Rachel Sermanni (born 7 November 1991) is a Scottish folk musician from Carrbridge in Strathspey. She has toured with a number of well-known folk and indie artists in the United Kingdom. Her debut studio album Under Mountains was released in September 2012.

== Early life ==
Sermanni's grandfather moved from the Italian town of Barga in Tuscany to Scotland at a young age, the family later settling in Carrbridge, where she grew up. Her father is a police dog handler and her mother works for the National Health Service (NHS), helping children with mental health issues. She began singing and playing music in the forms of plays or spoof songs with her younger brother and sister, although at the time she dismissed this as being a normal household environment. Her father taught her to play "Twinkle, Twinkle, Little Star" on the pennywhistle, which eventually led to the guitar.

== Career ==
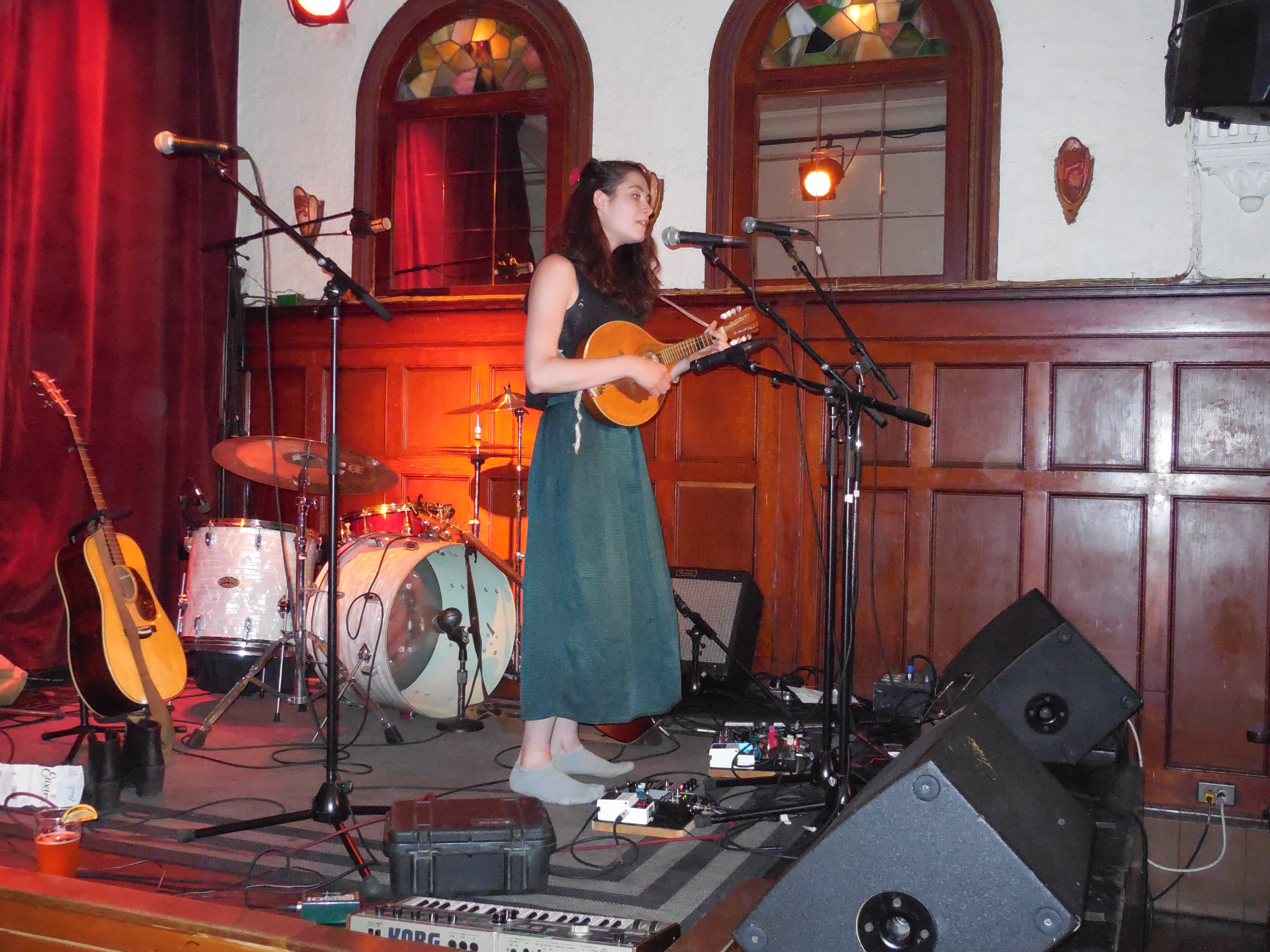
Sermanni performing in 2015

Sermanni was influenced by musicians such as Eva Cassidy, Van Morrison and Bob Dylan, and has talked about vivid dreams that slowly transform into songs. She developed and understood performing when she began listening and performing Scotland's traditional music at school. One of the first songs she wrote at 16 was featured on her first album, despite it being four years old by the time of its release. Sermanni performed in pubs around Glasgow; in September 2009 she went to see the folk rock band Mumford & Sons perform at the Loopallu festival in Ullapool, and after the performance, she found them in a pub "and asked them if they wanted to jam", resulting in a session on the beach. In 2011 she supported them at Dingwalls in London. Sermanni also toured with Fink on his European tour in 2011, was showcased at the Celtic Connections festival in Glasgow, has supported Elvis Costello and Rumer, and performed at 150 gigs between June 2011 and June 2012.

Rough Trade Records released an EP, Black Currents, in February 2012, and in August, Sermanni appeared on the BBC Music Introducing Stage at the Reading Festival. In October she toured Ireland, and on 31 December 2012, she headlined BBC Scotland's annual Hogmanay live programme, appearing in the Glasgow studio with Frightened Rabbit, Phil Cunningham and Aly Bain. Glasgow newspaper The Herald chose her as one of their "Stars of 2012". Her debut studio album, Under Mountains, was released on Middle of Nowhere Records and Rough Trade Records in September 2012.

In 2019, her fourth album, So It Turns, was released.

In 2021, Sermanni hosted a bi-monthly podcast titled Rachel Sermanni's Finger That Points to the Moon.

In September 2023, she released her fifth album, Dreamer Awake.

== Personal life ==
Sermanni has a child with fellow Scottish musician Adam Holmes. Their daughter was born on 5 March 2018.

== Discography ==
=== Albums ===
Year	Album	Chart peak	
Year	Album	SCO	UK Indie
2012	Under Mountains	26	23
2014	Live in Dawson City	—	—
2015	Tied to the Moon	25	32
2019	So It Turns	—	—
2023	Dreamer Awake	8	27

=== EPs ===
Year	Album	Album details
2011	The Bothy Sessions	Format: CD, digital download
2012	Black Currents	Format: CD, digital download
2013	The Boatshed Sessions	Format: CD, digital download
2014	Everything Changes	Format: CD, digital download
2016	Gently	Format: CD, digital download
2021	Swallow Me	Format: 12" Vinyl, digital download
2022	Every Swimming Pool Runs to the Sea	Format: digital download

=== Singles ===
Year	Album	Album details
2012	"Eggshells"	Format: CD / 7" Vinyl Deluxe Package, digital download
2013	"Ae Fond Kiss"	Format: CD, digital download
2014	"Everything Is Ok"	Format: CD, digital download
2017	"Lay My Heart"	Format: CD, digital download
2019	"What Can I Do"	Format: CD, digital download
2019	"Tiger"	Format: CD, digital download
2021	"Brighton House"	Format: CD, digital download
2021	"My Moon My Man"	Format: MP3 (collaboration with the Fretless)
2022	"Aquarium Kisses"	Format: MP3 (self released)
