= Bob's Red Mill =

U.S. brand of whole-grain foods

Coordinates: 45°25′30″N 122°35′28″W

- Type: Private
- Industry: Food
- Founded: 1978; 48 years ago
- Founder: Bob Moore
- Headquarters: Milwaukie, Oregon, U.S.
- Key people: Trey Winthrop (CEO)
- Products: Natural, gluten-free and organic foods
- Revenue: $100 million (2018)
- Number of employees: 500+
- Website: www.bobsredmill.com

Bob's Red Mill is an American brand of whole-grain food marketed by employee-owned American company Bob's Red Mill Natural Foods of Milwaukie, Oregon. The company was established in 1978 by Bob and Charlee Moore, early adopters of the whole grains movement, when other suppliers were making more money by making faster, cheaper products.

The company markets natural grains and certified organic grains, as well as gluten-free milled grain products—marketing itself as the "nation's leading miller of diverse whole-grain foods", and distributing its products in the United States, Canada, and a number of other locations.

The company produces over 200 products, primarily whole grains ground with quartz millstones, as well as baking mixes, beans, seeds, nuts, dried fruits, spices, and herbs, in over 70 countries. The products are marketed through seventy natural food and specialty grocery distributors in the United States and Canada, as well as via the company's online store, and the company's factory store and restaurant.

== History ==
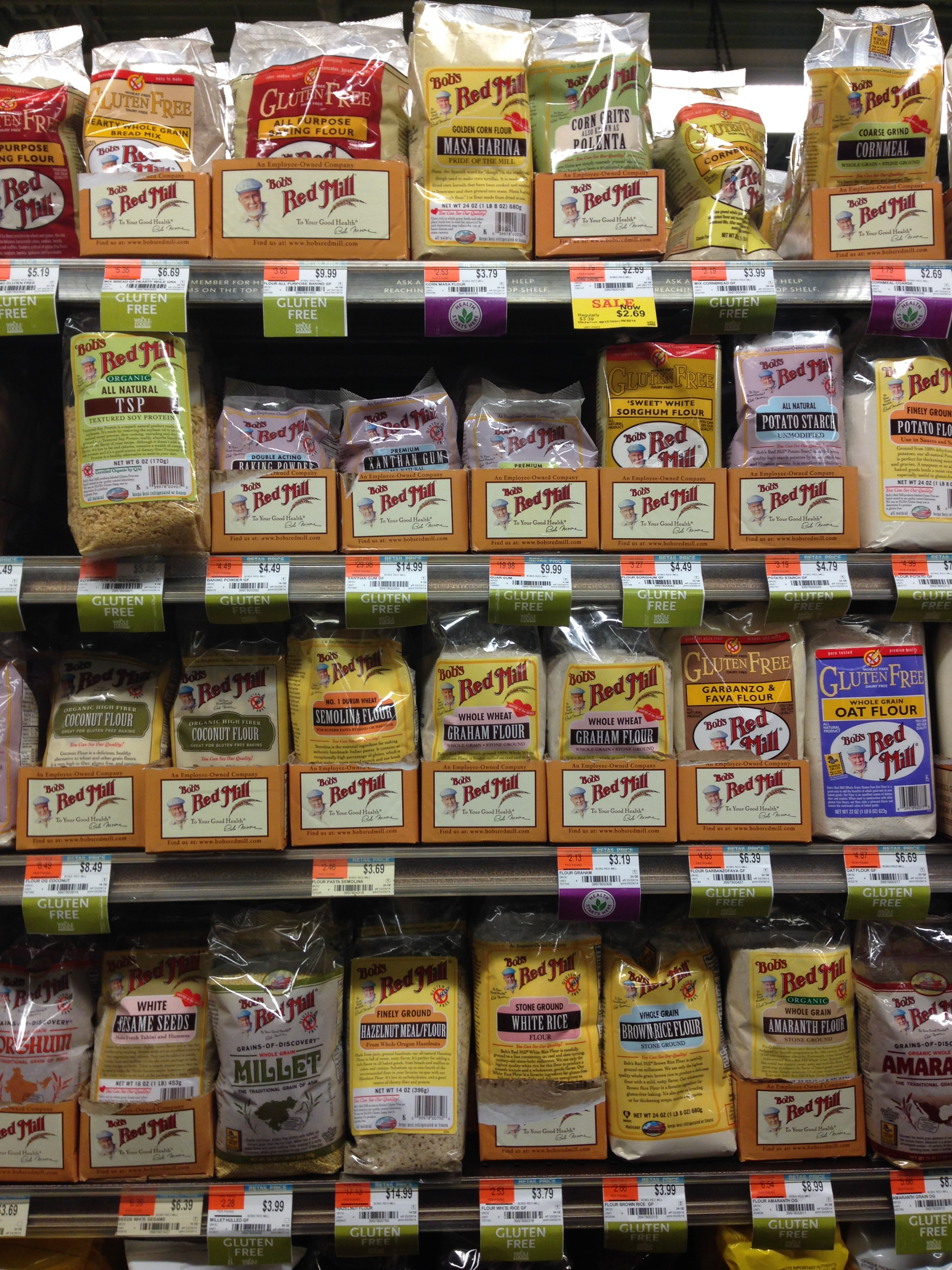
Bob's Red Mill products on grocery store shelves

In the 1950s, Moore briefly owned a gas station in Los Angeles. The smog in the city influenced Bob and his wife Charlee to sell the station, and move to Mammoth Lakes, a small resort town in the mountains about 300 miles (480 km) north of Los Angeles where he opened a second gas station. After its failure, Moore was forced to move his family into an empty rental property owned by their minister.

Moore worked in the hardware department of a Sears store located in Sacramento and was a manager at a J.C. Penney auto shop in Redding. He subsequently bought a five-acre goat farm where he and Charlee raised their sons. He and his sons sold milk and eggs locally. Charlee began experimenting with baking whole grain bread. Moore's drive for healthier foods started with his father's death of a heart attack at age 49, and his wife's grandmother's healthy eating obsession.

In the 1950s, he discovered a book called John Goffe's Mill by George Woodbury at a local library. It details how an archeologist rebuilt a New Hampshire flour mill and went into business with no prior experience. He began experimenting with stone-ground flours in the mid-1960s after reading. Stone grinding, largely abandoned when the flour industry moved to steel grinding burrs, used quartz millstones operating at lower temperatures, blending the germ, its oil, the bran, and the endosperm. By this point, the Moore family had adopted a back-to-basics diet that included whole grains.

He purchased millstones dating back to the 1880s from a company in Fayetteville, North Carolina, which sat for a few years until 1974, when Moore, his wife, and two of his three sons started Moore's Flour Mill, in Redding, California. The mill was converted from a Quonset hut.

After four years, Bob and his wife retired from the Redding Mill and left his sons to run it. That mill still produces some products under contract with Moore's current company.

=== Bob's Red Mill ===
The Moores moved to Portland, where Bob attended a seminary to study the Bible for several months. Bob found a commercial flour mill in Oregon City that was for sale, painted it red, and went back into the flours business. Moore bought millstones from the closed Boyd mill near Dufur, Oregon. He acquired other stones from old mills in Indiana and Tennessee. Bob's Red Mill Natural Foods went into business in 1978 and began producing stone ground flours and cereals for the local area. The product was sold direct through his store until he made a deal with the Fred Meyer grocery stores to carry his products.

Starting in the 1980's Moore's own likeness began to appear on product packaging. In 1983, Moore's employees approached him about buying into the company. He devised a profit-sharing plan as a result. By 1990, Moore was issuing monthly checks to employees who had been with the company for at least a year.

In 1988, annual sales to area health food stores and smaller grocers were approaching $3 million when the original mill was destroyed by an arsonist's fire. The millstones were spared, as grain from the second floor fell on them in the fire, which extinguished the flames around the mills, keeping the quartz stones from shattering in the heat and preserving the gears that turned them.

The company reopened in 1989 and built a new mill in Milwaukie, Oregon, unsuccessful in finding an existing mill that would do after Moore was flown around the state by friends. The couple borrowed $2.5 million to rebuild the factory and warehouse into a new 60,000-square-foot (5,600 m^{2}) facility. Bob continued to grow the business by working with small markets, local retail and larger wholesale customers, rather than a corporate approach. The new facility allowed them to introduce gluten-free products in the 1990s. They were also one of the first flour mills to build laboratories that tested their products to certify organic and gluten-free compliance.

In 1996, the Moores took on partners to expand and pay off their debt. Dennis Gilliam, who came from the printing business, became their vice-president of sales and marketing. John Wagner became vice-president of administration. Gilliam expanded the company wholesaling with California-based Quality Brokerage and Nature's Best, the company's first large regional distributors.

Wagner helped the company control debt by building and repairing machinery in-house, and through the purchasing of used machinery needed for expansion from older and closed mills like Seattle-based Fisher Mills, Inc.

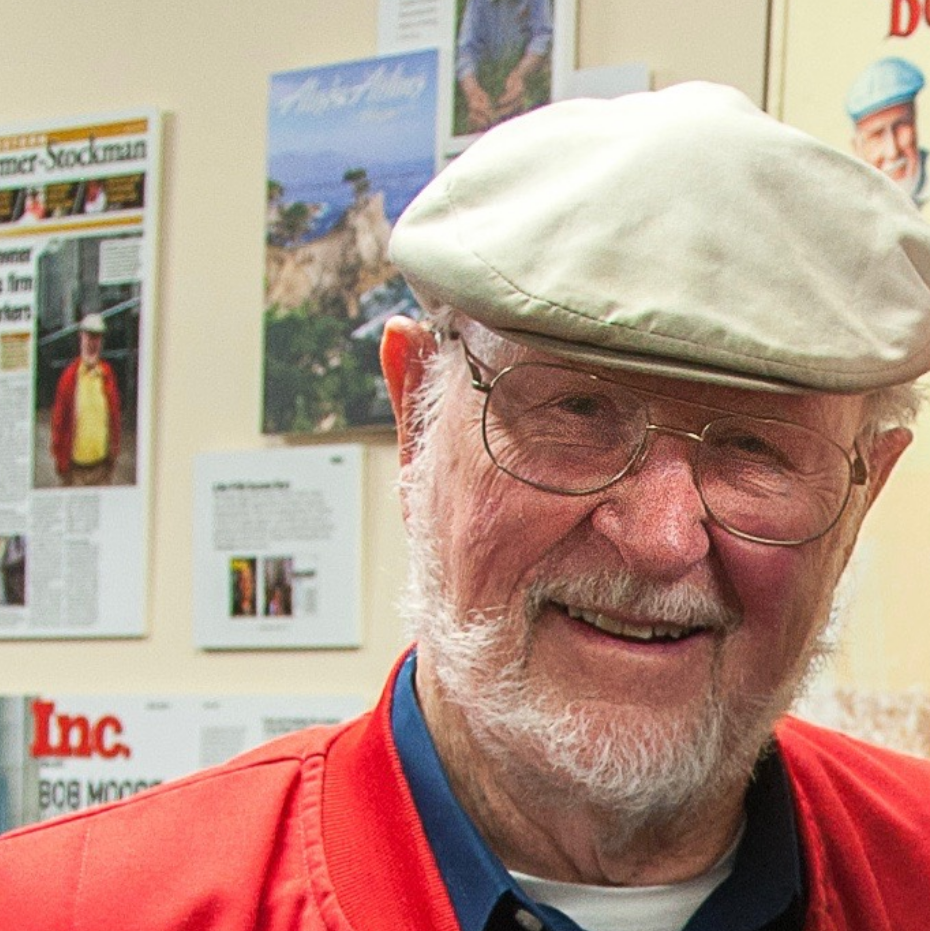
Bob Moore, founder of Bob's Red Mill

The company expanded internationally starting in 2000. In 2003, Bob's Red Mill was a founding member of the Oldways Whole Grain Council, a food and nutrition nonprofit that promotes the use of whole grains. In October 2003, the company opened its Whole Grain Store & Visitors Center, a 15,000 sq ft (1,400 m^{2}) addition to its existing facility. It doubled as the company's new headquarters and featured an 18-foot-high operational water wheel, displays of historic milling equipment, a working stone mill, bookstore, and kitchen classroom. In 2004, the company nearly doubled its warehouse and distribution operations when it moved to a 65,000 sq ft (6,000 m^{2}) facility. In 2005, it was estimated that Bob's Red Mill's annual revenue was between US$30 million and $50 million.

As of 2005, its products were available in Japan and the company intends to expand distribution to other countries. In June 2007, the company announced that it was moving both its administrative headquarters, and manufacturing and warehousing facility to a 325,000-square-foot (30,200 m^{2}) building from its original 130,000-square-foot (12,000 m^{2}) facility, which it planned to sell and sub-lease. Its current manufacturing facility is 82,000 square feet (7,600 m^{2}). The new facility tripled the company's manufacturing capacity.

=== Employee ownership ===
In February 2010, owner Bob Moore transferred one-third of the company to his employees using an employee stock ownership plan. By 2011, the company had 284 products, including 70 gluten-free items, and made more than $110 million in revenue. In 2011, Bob and Charlee Moore donated $25 million to establish the Bob and Charlee Moore Institute for Nutrition & Wellness at Oregon Health & Science University. In January 2014, the company opened a new 125,000-square-foot (11,600 m^{2}) distribution center in Clackamas County. All storage and distribution activities were moved from the Milwaukie headquarters to this new facility. In December 2017, Bob's Red Mill introduced a new Sourced Non-GMO Pledge emblem to all its product packaging to emphasize the company's commitment to sourcing only natural ingredients.

By 2018, the company's annual revenue was estimated at more than $100 million. In 2018, Charlee died and Bob retired as CEO but remained as president and board member. COO Dennis Vaughn was announced as the company's new CEO. By April 2020, 100% of the company was owned by its more than 700 employees. In September 2021, Vaughn retired and CFO Trey Winthrop was elevated to CEO. For years, Bob's Red Mill sold products over the phone, via mail order, and through its website, but the company stopped all direct to consumer operations in August 2022. Moore died in 2024 at the age of 94.

== Awards and recognition ==
Bob's Red Mill began competing in the World Porridge Making Championship in 2009. The company won the Golden Spurtle in 2010, using just oats, water, and salt in the Traditional category and debuted its own Spar For the Spurtle competition in 2011. They were the first Americans to win the award. It won for the Specialty category in 2012, which allows for additional ingredients. Moore himself entered the competition and won the Golden Spurtle award in 2016.

Bob's Red Mill has been recognized for its status as an employee-owned company, winning an ESOP Marketing Award in 2018.

Following Moore's death in 2024, the Portland Business Journal created the "Moore Admired Award" to honor a CEO or president whose leadership exemplifies that of the Bob's Red Mill founder. Columbia Sportswear's CEO and president Tim Boyle was the first to receive the award.
