= Stoneground flour =

Type of wholegrain flour

Stoneground flour is whole grain flour produced by the traditional process of grinding grain between two millstones. This is in contrast to mass-produced flours which are generally produced using rollers. The process leaves the wheatgerm more intact than roller processes for producing wholemeal flour, the larger pieces of bran and other components of the grain cause it to have a coarser texture but greater flavour. This affects its ability to rise; however, it can produce a more satisfying texture for some baked products. The inclusion of more bran and intact wheatgerm in the flour means that it is often credited with significant health benefits.

In the US, flour only has to "pass between stones" once during its manufacture to be regarded as stoneground, and it has been claimed that a significant proportion of flour sold as stoneground in the US has not been processed in this way, being ordinary roller-ground wholemeal.
