= Landmark Forest Adventure Park =

Amusement park in Scotland

- Landmark Forest Adventure Park logo
- Interactive map of Landmark Forest Adventure Park
- Location: Carrbridge, Scottish Highlands
- Coordinates: 57°16′40″N 3°48′46″W
- Status: Operating
- Opened: 1970
- Theme: Outdoors Activity/Nature
- Website: Landmark Home

Landmark Forest Adventure Park is a nature-based theme and adventure park in Carrbridge, Highlands, Scotland, which opened in 1970. It is located within an area of ancient pine woodland and was voted Scotland's Favourite Park in 2023. It was developed by David Hayes as one of the first purpose-built visitor centres in Europe, and was officially opened by Prince Philip, Duke of Edinburgh.

== History ==
The park was opened in July 1970 by Prince Philip, Duke of Edinburgh. It was developed by David Hayes, who drew inspiration from visitor centres in the United States. At the time of its opening, the site included an exhibition hall, restaurant, craft shop, nature trail and picnic areas, with an initial focus on presenting the history and natural environment of the Scottish Highlands.

== Attractions ==
The park includes a range of outdoor and indoor attractions such as water rides, high ropes courses, nature trails and themed areas, including a butterfly house, dinosaur-themed exhibits and illusion-based attractions.

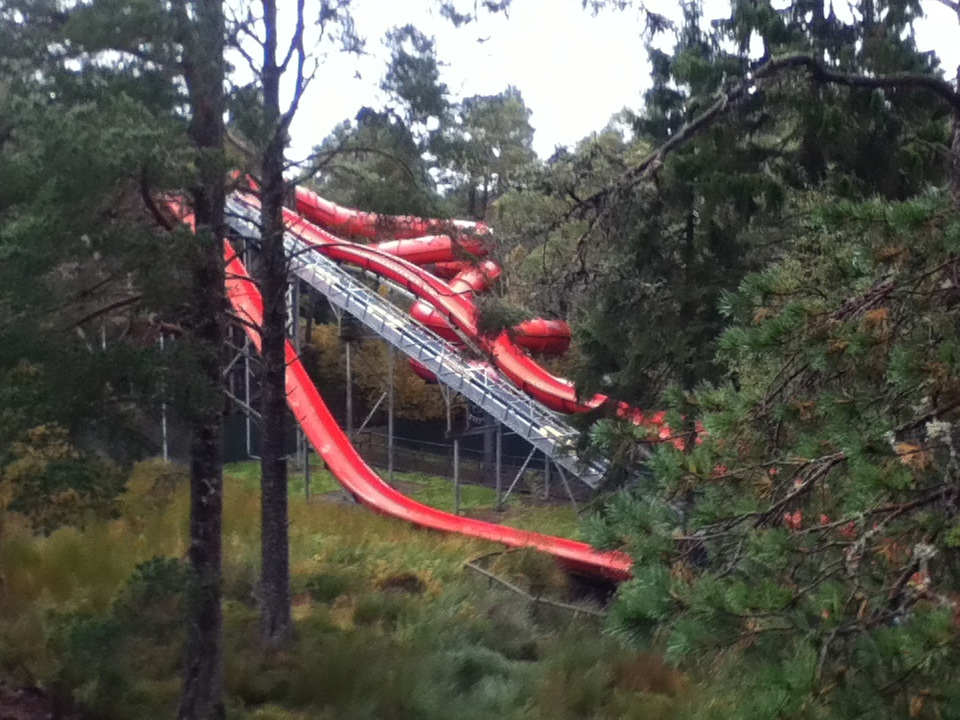
Water slides in the park

Attractions
Attraction	Description	Opened
Ant City Play Area	Large children's play area with a multi-storey tower and chutes.	–
Fire Tower	A large wooden tower, promoted as the UK's tallest.	–
RopeworX	Aerial high ropes course with obstacles at varying heights.	–
Pinnacle	A 10-metre-tall (33 ft) climbing tower.	–
Tarzan Trail	A low-level ropes course designed for younger visitors.	–
Wildwater Coaster	A dinghy-slide complex featuring three slides.	–

== Incidents ==
In August 2021, a rollercoaster known as the "Runaway Timber Train" derailed after a mechanical fault caused it to lose its wheels. Two 12-year-old girls were injured and later treated for whiplash. The ride was subsequently closed and later removed from the park.
