= Edinburgh International Climbing Arena =

Sports venue in City of Edinburgh

Coordinates: 55.92352°N 3.397865°W

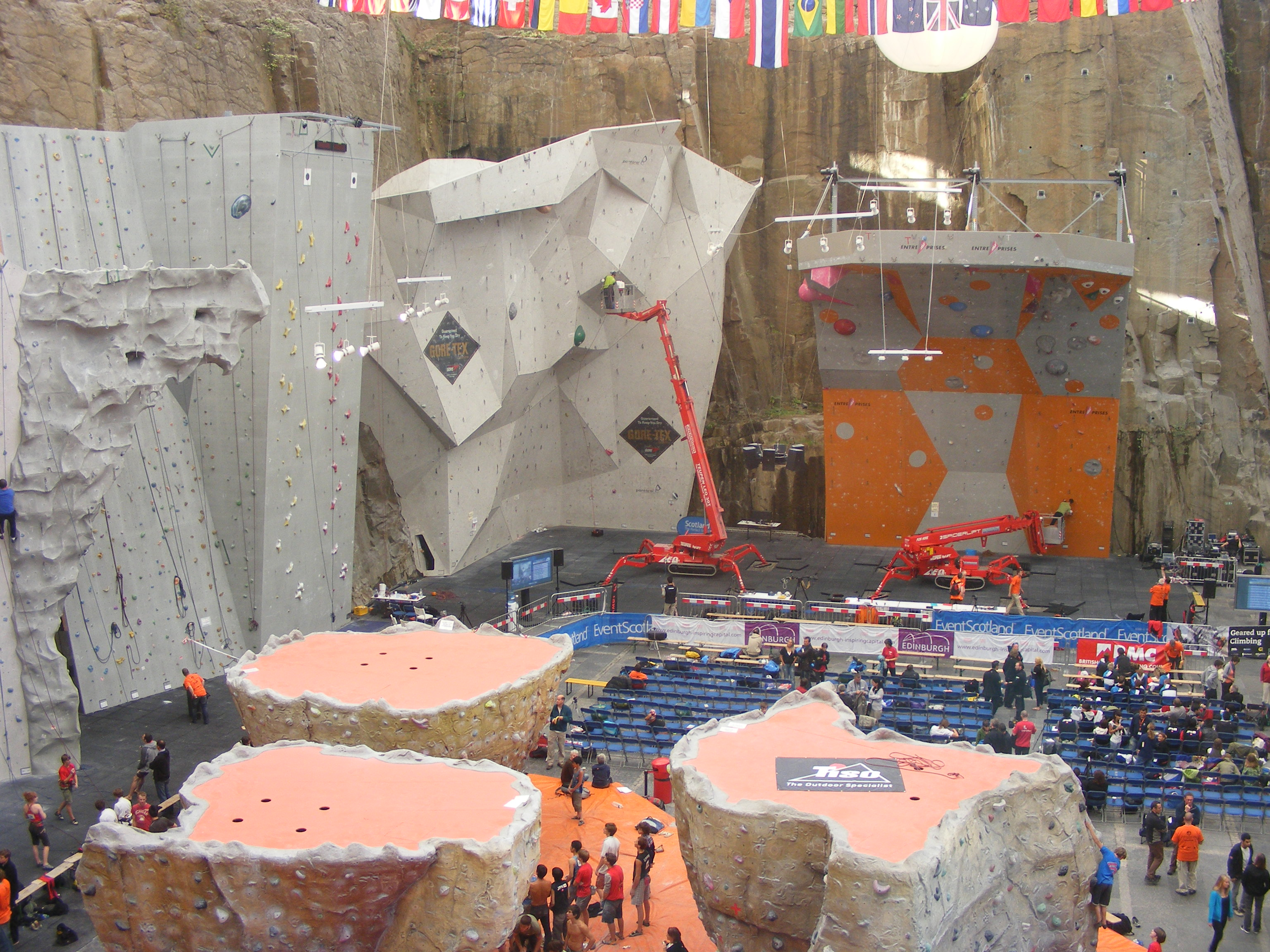
Overview of the Arena

Edinburgh International Climbing Arena (EICA:Ratho, formerly the Ratho Adventure Centre) is an adventure sports facility located in Ratho, near Edinburgh, Scotland. Built in a disused quarry, it is one of the largest indoor climbing walls in the world.

It was purchased by the City of Edinburgh Council and fully reopened in May 2007 after a further programme of works costing around £6 million. The centre is now used by both recreational climbers and for competitions, and is also home to the Scottish National Judo Academy.

== History ==
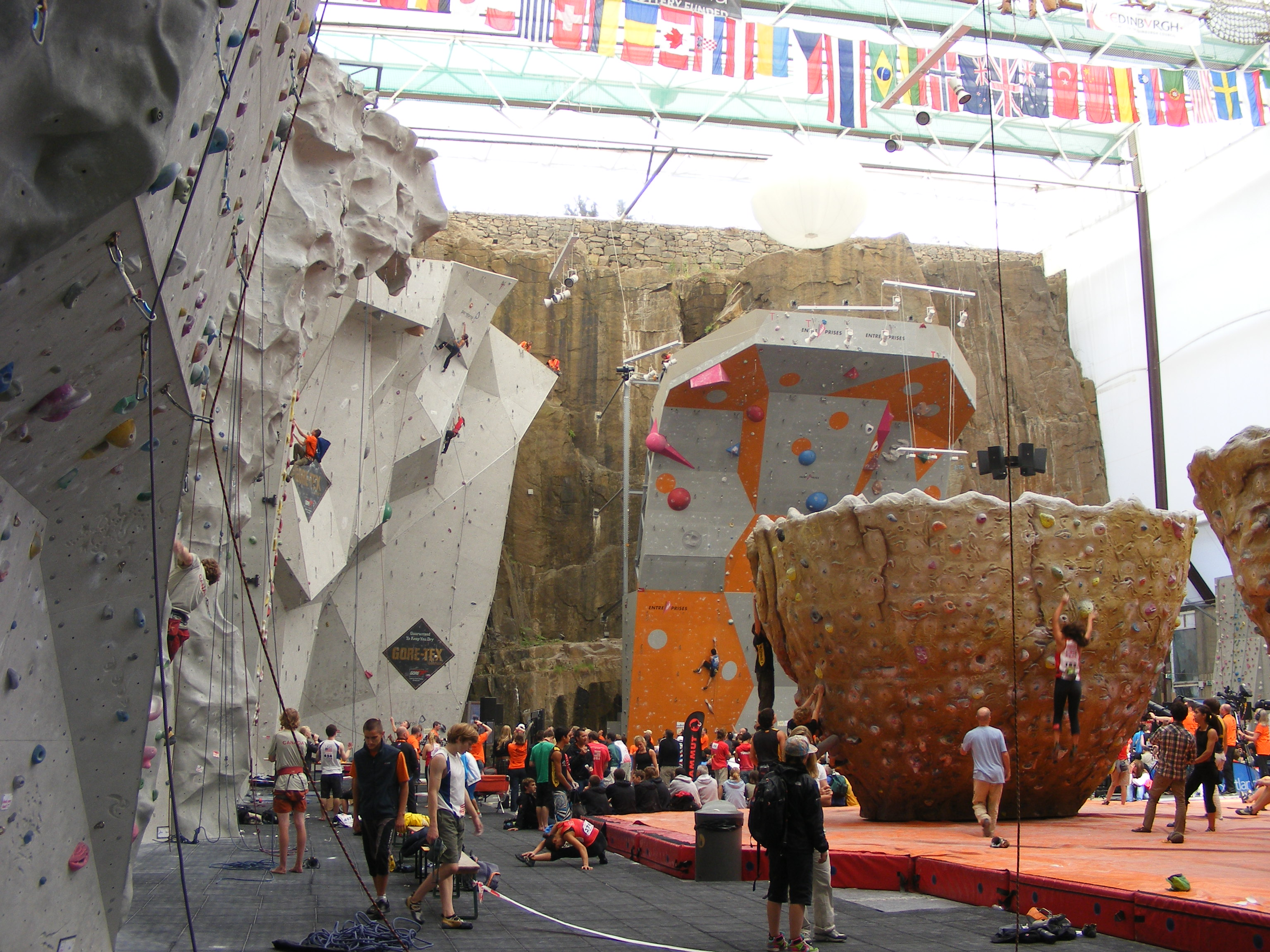
Interior of the Arena

Originally used for supplying stone to the Central Belt of Scotland due to its proximity to the Union Canal, the quarry expanded from around a third of its present size in 1853 to the current outline in 1895. Edinburgh climbers Rab Anderson, Duncan McCallum and architect David Taylor formed the Ratho Quarry Company, and purchased the quarry in 1995 as the site for the climbing centre. The quarry, which had been unused for around ninety years, was filled with compacted rubble and heavily overgrown with trees and shrubs, making assessment of the site difficult until significant work had been carried out, but the assumption that the floor of the quarry was flat proved to be correct. Plans unveiled in late 2001 showed the estimated cost to be £7 million, with funding of £1.5 million to come from a Sportscotland lottery fund grant.

The climbing centre is located in the smaller of two lobes of a figure of eight that make up the quarry. After 250,000 tonnes (250,000 long tons; 280,000 short tons) of rubble was removed, the quarry was shown to have a broadly level floor and be almost 30 metres (98 ft) deep. During construction in April 2002, the partially completed roof was ripped off in a storm.

When it opened in December 2003, the centre was the largest indoor climbing arena in the world, but problems during construction increased the final cost to £22 million. In March 2004 the centre went into receivership due to a leaky roof, poor management, and a lack of money, leaving a number of contractors unpaid. It was purchased by the City of Edinburgh Council in October 2005 for £3.87 million, and then closed in August 2006 to allow full completion of the venue.

It reopened on 25 May 2007, under the management of Edinburgh Leisure, a non-profit organisation which provides sport and leisure facilities on behalf of the City of Edinburgh Council. £6 million was spent overhauling the roof, the plumbing, improving the car park and converting an unopened scuba diving tank into a dedicated bouldering room. Under new management, more emphasis was placed on making the centre accessible to families and visitors as well as experienced climbers. The roof, consisting of 8,500 square metres (91,000 sq ft) of tensioned fabric, was replaced at the end of 2013 at a cost of around £500,000.

== Climbing ==
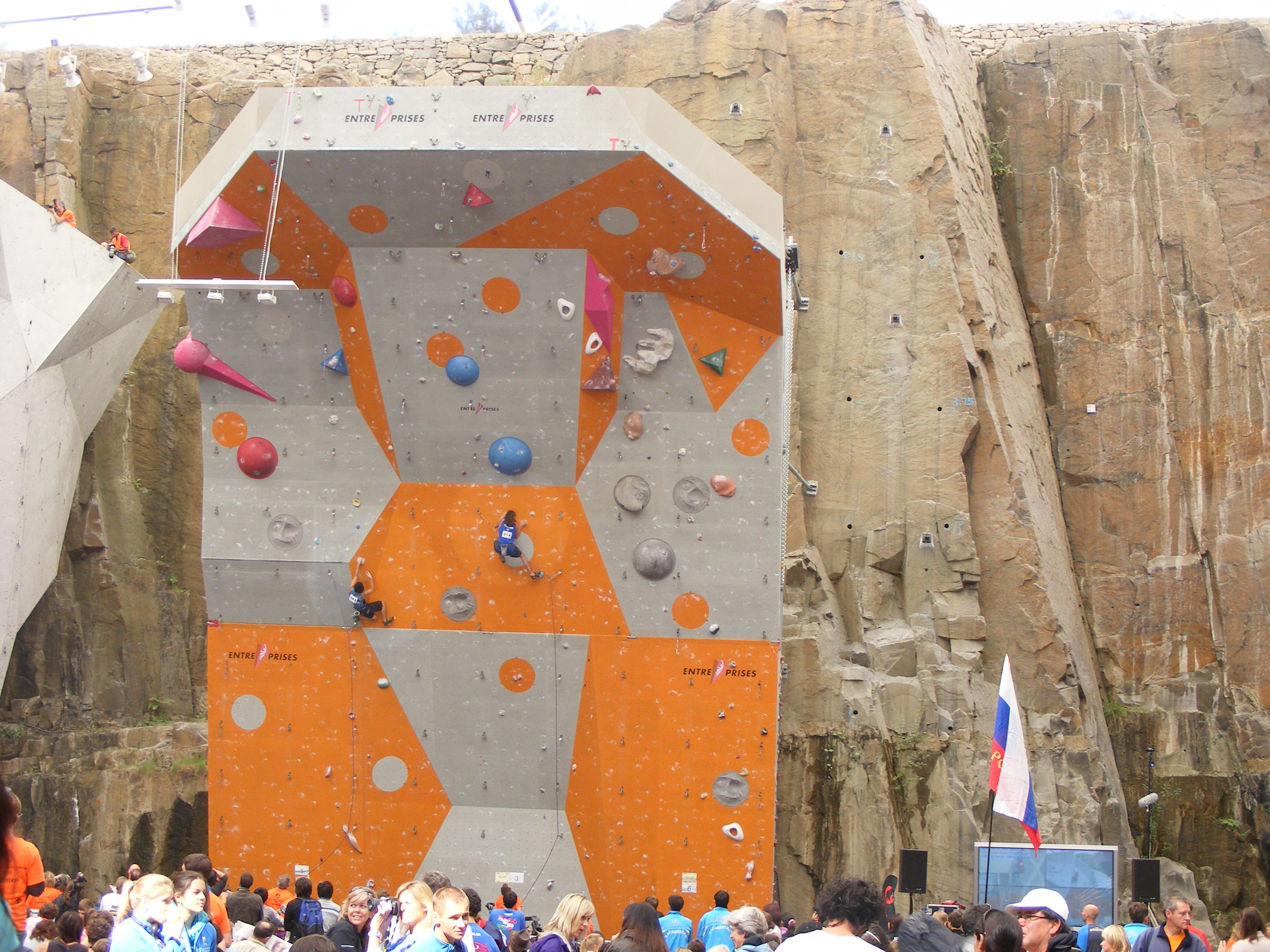
The articulated climbing wall

There are over 15,000 bolt-on holds in the centre, with 300 routes ranging in difficulty from grades 2 to 8b. There are a variety of lead and top rope walls at the centre ranging from 6 to 28 metres. In December 2024 new bouldering facilities were opened replacing the original trio of boulders in the centre of the main hall, these will allow the centre to hold World cup level bouldering events. There is also a dedicated bouldering room, with routes ranging in difficulty from V0 to V15.

The official world record World Climbing speed climbing walls have two identical speed routes which allow speed climbing competitions to be conducted head to head. There is an articulated competition wall known as "The Hanger" that can be raised or lowered to change the angle of overhang.

The larger "lobe" of the quarry is also used for outdoor climbing, although some of the rock is described as "loose and scary". Formed from dolerite, there are around 65 known routes, including many central belt classics such as Shear Fear (E2 5b) and Wally I (E2 5C).

There is a cafe overlooking the main arena as well as smaller cafe on the ground floor. The centre has a fully equipped gym. Other classes are held in the Fitness Studio. The centre also has a softplay with a café called Scrambles for children aged around 0-10 . The centre also houses Scottish National Judo Academy, and Canoe Scotland's Sprint Performance programme.

== Events ==
=== Competitions ===
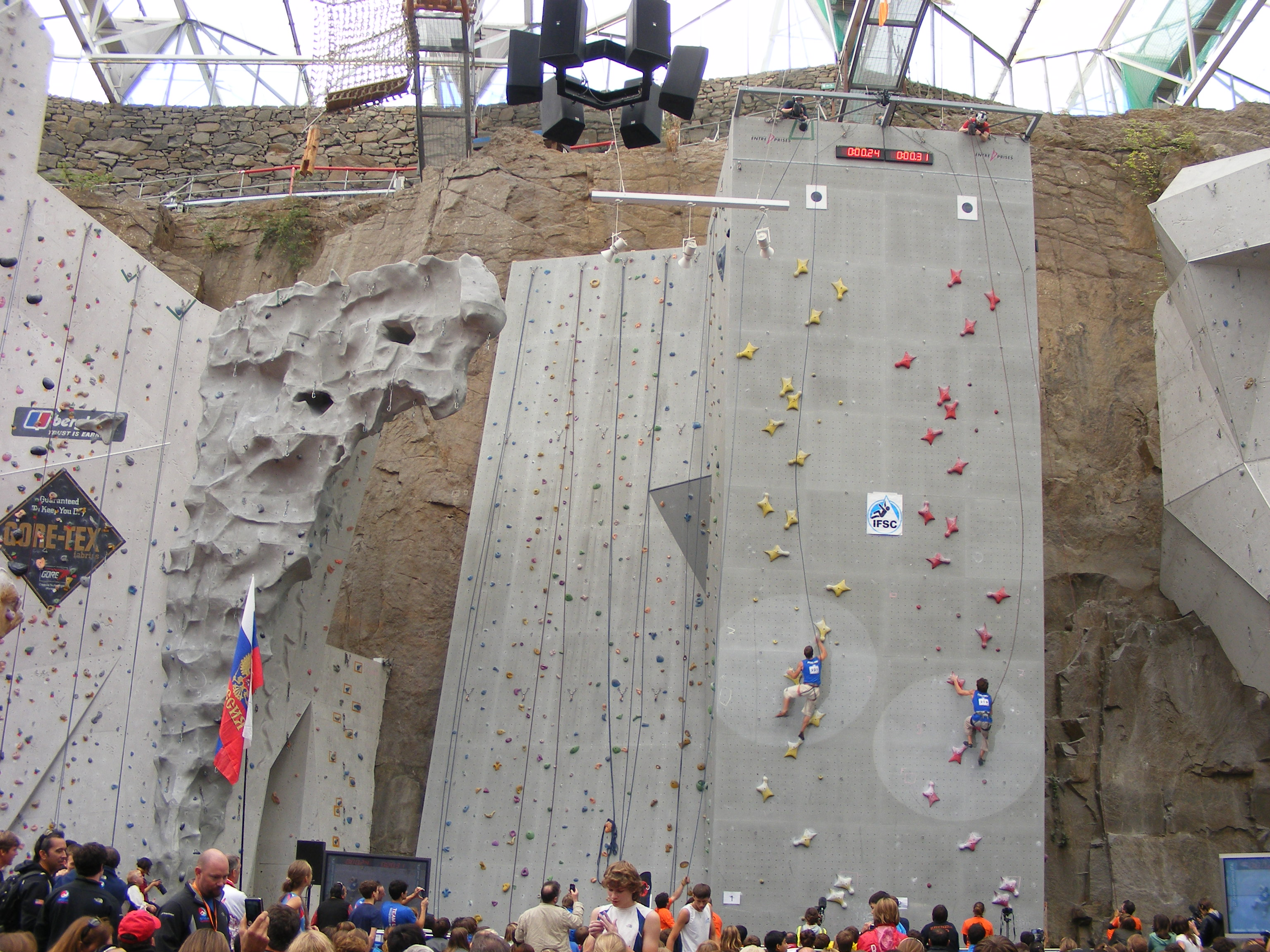
Climbers on the Speed Wall, IFSC World Youth Championship, 2010

EICA hosted the UIAA-ICC Boulder & Lead World Cup in December 2003, the IFSC World Cup Lead and Speed in September 2017, the IFSC European Championship (Lead and Speed) in October 2019, and the 13th event of the IFSC World Cup series from 9 to 11 September 2022.

The centre also hosted the IFSC World Youth Championship in 2004 and 2010, The European Youth Championships in 2015, and the European Youth Cup 2009, 2011, 2012, 2013 and 2014.

At a national level the British Lead Climbing Championships and the Youth Climbing Series Grand Final have been held alternately at the centre since 2008.

=== Theatre ===
In the Edinburgh International Festival 2013, Leaving Planet Earth used the centre as the stage.

=== Politics ===
On 20 April 2015 the Scottish National Party held their manifesto launch for the 2015 general election in the main climbing arena.
