= Spurtle =

Scottish kitchen utensil

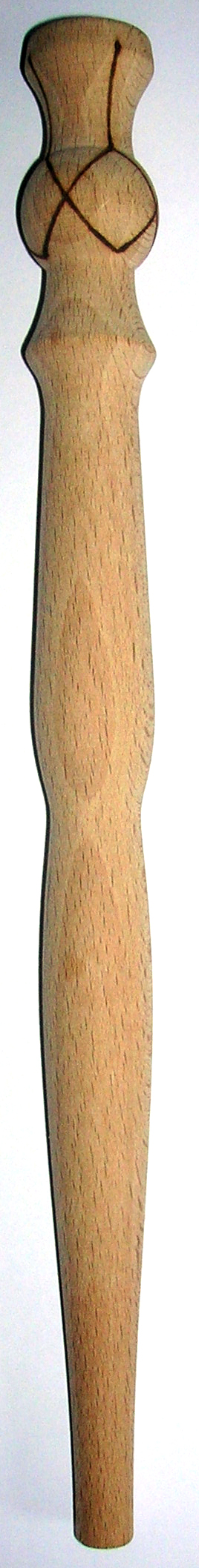
A 28 cm (11 in) spurtle, with decorated end resembling a Scottish thistle

The spurtle (or "spurtel", "spurtil", "spirtle", or "spartle") is a wooden Scottish kitchen tool, dating from the 15th century, that is used to stir porridge, soups, stews, and broths.

The rod-like shape means that porridge can be stirred without congealing and forming lumps, unlike a spoon, which would have a dragging effect during stirring. The low surface area reduces the chances of porridge sticking to the instrument.

Spurtles are made from wood, typically beech, cherry wood, or maple. They come in a range of sizes. Traditional spurtles have stylised thistles at the top, while modern ones often have a smooth taper.

== Etymology ==
Old Scots spurtell is recorded from 1528. The Northern English dialect had a word spartle that meant "stirrer". The modern West Germanic and North Germanic languages, as well as Middle English, also have spurtle cognates that refer to a flat-bladed tool or utensil – so more akin to the couthie spurtle (see below) in shape. Latin spatula, as used in medicine and pharmacy, is their shared ancestor. Spatula is a diminutive of Latin spatha, a broad, flat tool or weapon, which in turn is from Ancient Greek σπαθη ("spathe"), the broad, flat tool used in weaving, or a paddle. The ultimate source of σπαθη is hypothesized to come from the Proto-Indo-European (PIE) language *spe-dh- for spade and its root *spe- for a long, flat piece of wood. According to this theory, spade and spoon are also suggested as having derived from the same hypothetical PIE *spe-, potentially making those words distant cousins of spurtle.

== Couthie spurtle ==
Early spurtles were flat, wooden or metal instruments, with long handles and flat blades. The spatula-like utensils, known as couthie spurtles, are often used for flipping oatcakes or making pancakes – but not for making porridge.

== Modern culture ==
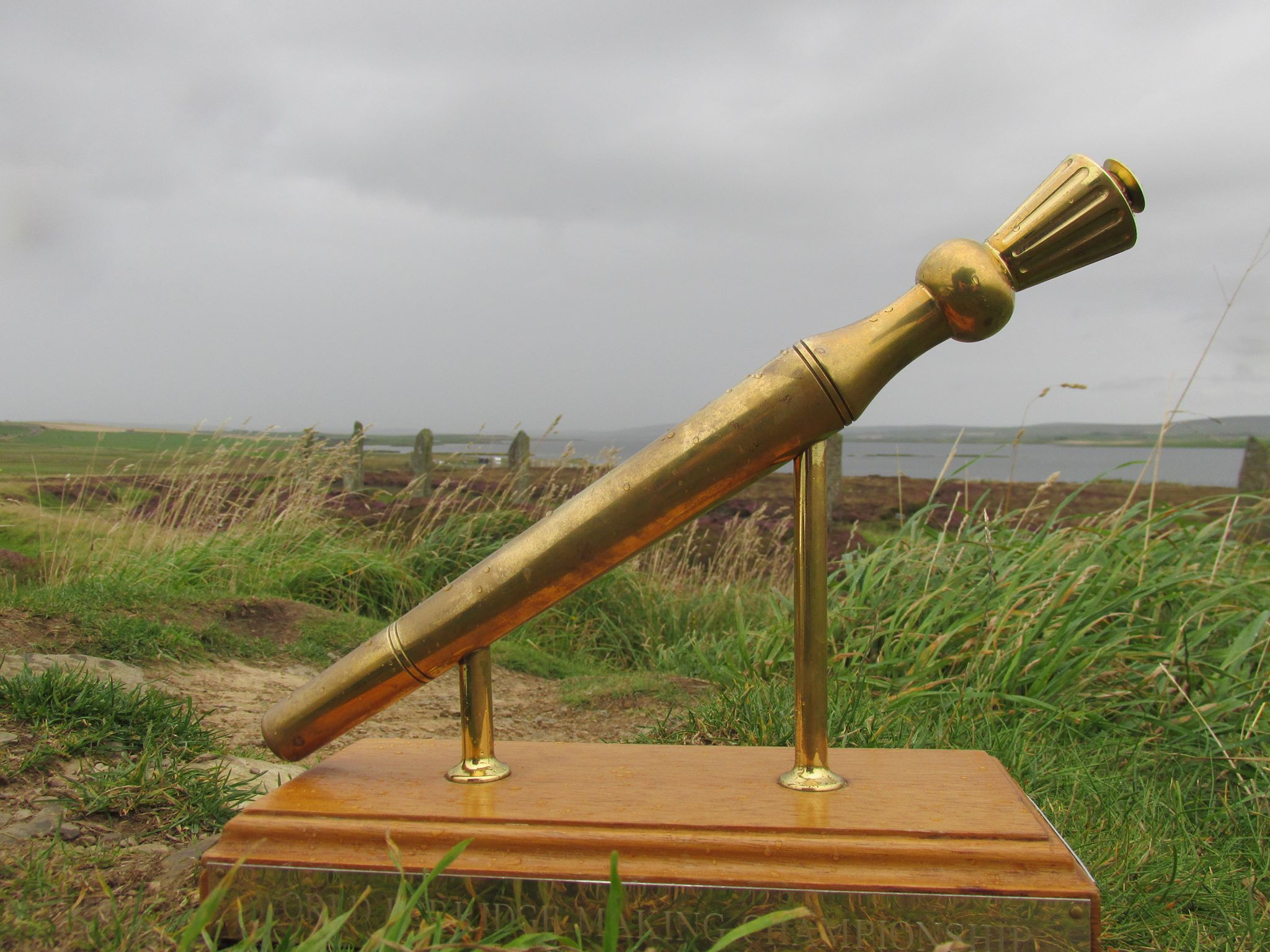
The Golden Spurtle trophy

The World Porridge Making Championship awards a "Golden Spurtle" as its main prize.
