= David Morier =

Swiss-born British painter (died 1770)

David Morier (1705? – c. 8 January 1770) was a Swiss-born British painter who specialised in portraits, military subjects and historical scenes around and after the time of the War of the Austrian Succession and the Jacobite rising of 1745.

== Equestrian portraits ==
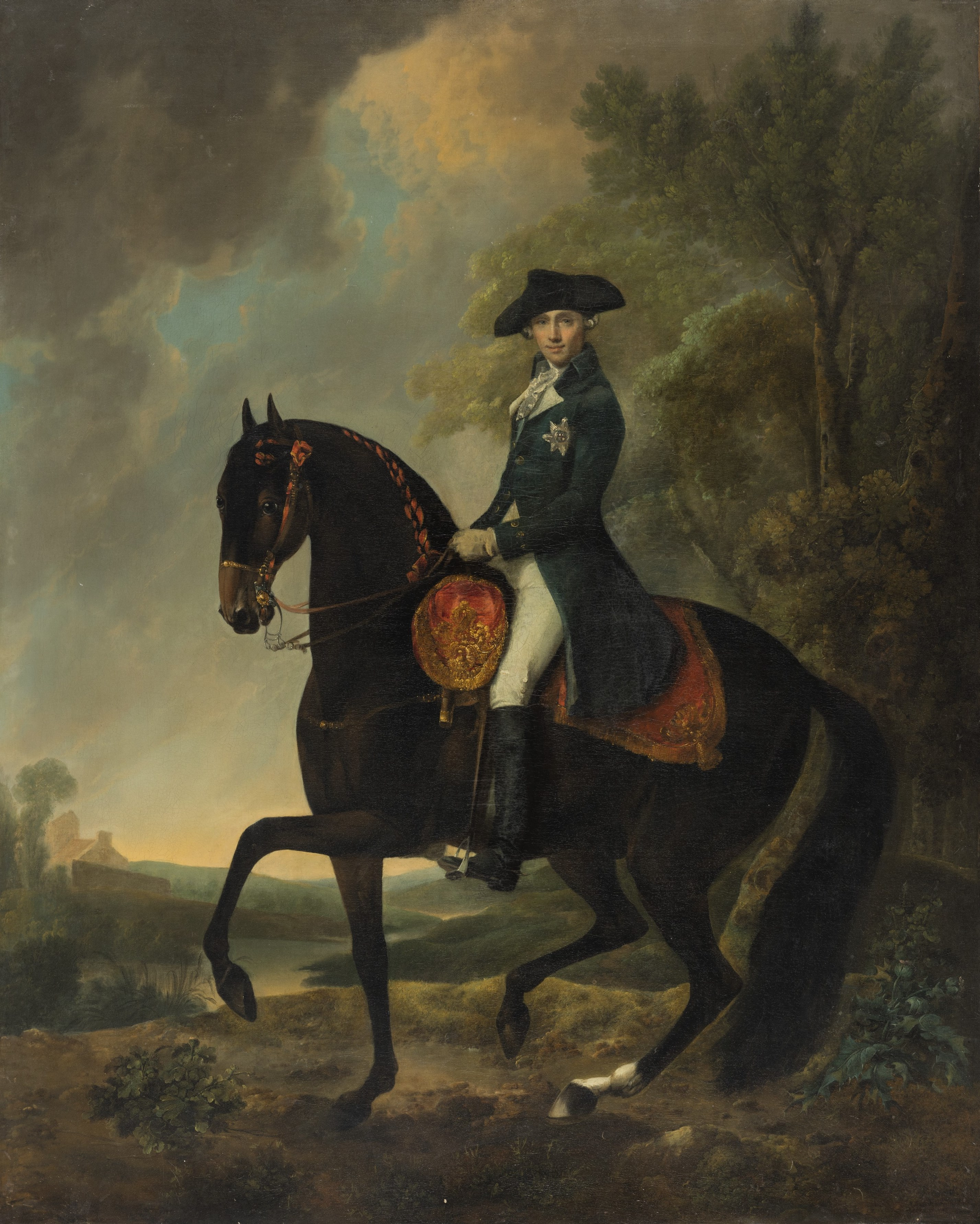
Considered one of the most expensive paintings by David Morier ever sold at auction: The equestrian portrait of Prince Henry, Duke of Cumberland and Strathearn, wearing the Order of the Garter.

When it came to portraits of kings and nobles, David Morier specialised in equestrian portraits. Morier painted equestrian portraits of some of the most famous aristocratic figures of his time, including King George II, King George III, Frederick, Prince of Wales, Prince William, Duke of Cumberland, Prince Henry, Duke of Cumberland and Strathearn, King Frederick II of Prussia, King Frederick V of Denmark, John Manners, Marquess of Granby, William Kerr, 4th Marquess of Lothian, John Ligonier, 1st Earl Ligonier, Henry Herbert, 10th Earl of Pembroke and Maurice de Saxe.

=== First notable painting ===
David Morier's first notable painting was an equestrian portrait of King George II, with a view of the Battle of Dettingen beyond. The painting was later engraved by Simon François Ravenet and published by the artist. This equestrian portrait is part of the Royal Collection. A copy of the engraving is in the British Museum.

== Early years ==
Little is known of David Morier's early life. Even his exact year of birth is unknown. Born in Bern, Morier initially trained as a miniaturist and portrait painter. Later, he gained prominence for his vivid and detailed depictions of military scenes. Therefore, Morier was predominantly considered a soldiers painter, influenced by the equestrian portraits of Jan Wyck, who, like Morier, made a career in England as a painter of sports and military scenes.

== An English career under royal patronage ==
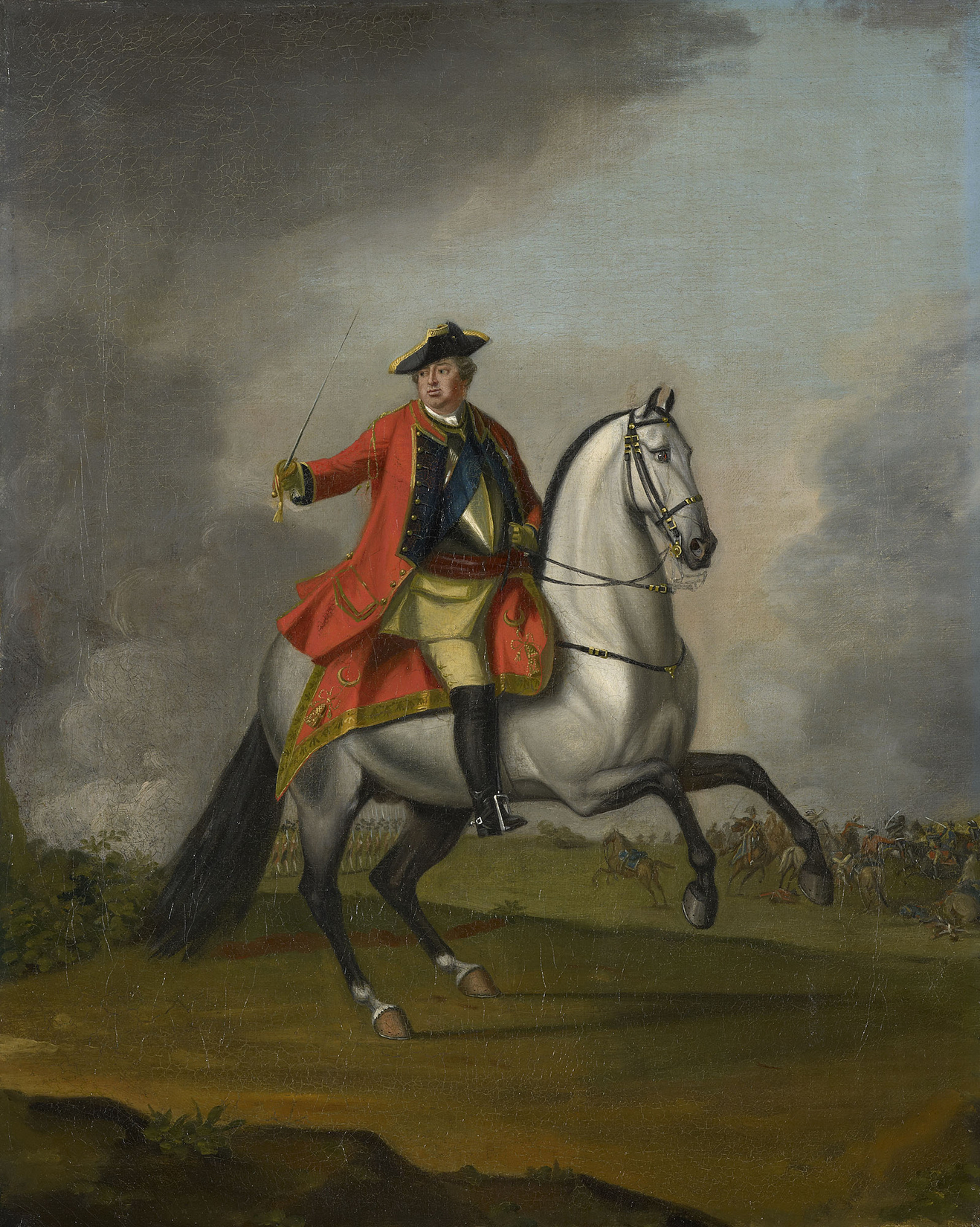
David Morier's patron: Equestrian portrait of Prince William, Duke of Cumberland, by David Morier.

In 1743, David Morier was introduced to Prince William, Duke of Cumberland, by Sir Everard Fawkener, in Germany, where the Duke of Cumberland was on campaign. In the same year, Morier arrived in England, and obtained the patronage of the Duke of Cumberland, who was the effective commander-in-chief of the British Army in the 1750s. From 1752 until 1764 Morier was employed as limner (painter) to the Duke of Cumberland on an annual salary of GBP 100. However, his name also appears regularly in royal accounts from 1764 to 1767.

=== Kings, dukes, earls, a smuggler – and the Godolphin Arabian ===
David Morier produced a number of equestrian portraits of his patron, the Duke of Cumberland, and other members of the Royal Family, including King George II and King George III. Some of these portraits were later engraved, such as the equestrian portraits of King George II and King George III by Simon François Ravenet and Peter Mazell respectively. Furthermore, some of the equestrian portraits of the Duke of Cumberland were engraved by John Faber the Younger and Louis-Simon Lempereur.

It exists a Chinese reverse-painted mirror after the 1751 engraving by Louis-Simon Lempereur of the Duke of Cumberland's equestrian portrait by David Morier, which the duke commissioned around 1750 to commemorate his victory at the Battle of Culloden. This reverse-painted mirror forms part of the collections of the Metropolitan Museum of Art since 2024.

An exotic element in David Morier's work is the portrait of John Pixley (birth unknown – in or after 1749), a smuggler and custom-house officer. John Pixley's portrait was later engraved by John Faber the Younger.

David Morier also produced several small paintings for King George III for 10 guineas apiece. Furthermore, in the 1760s, Morier was commissioned by Henry Herbert, Earl of Pembroke, to paint several paintings, including eight paintings of the 15th light dragoons.

==== The Godolphin Arabian ====
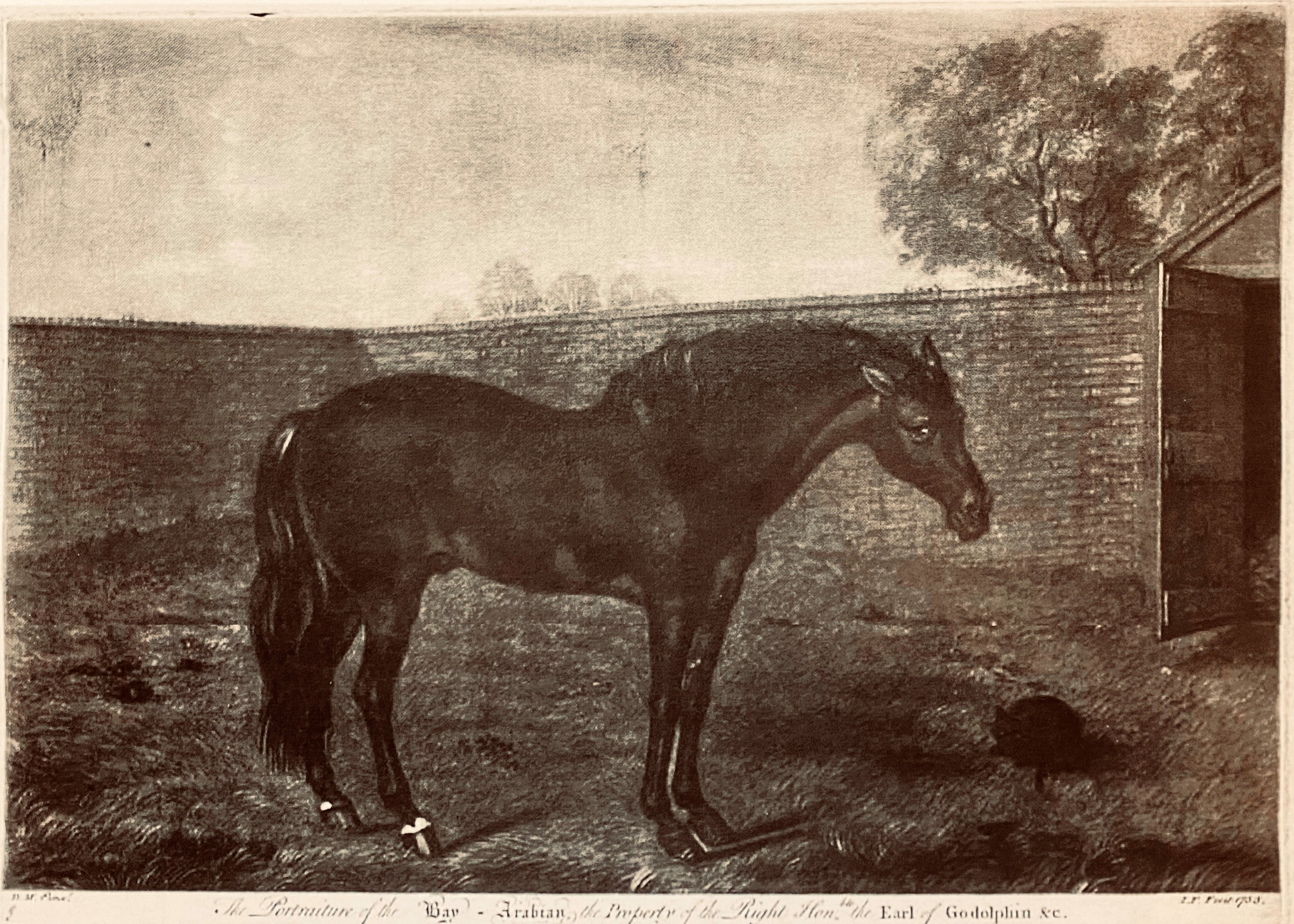
The Godolphin Arabian and the cat Grimalkin, engraved by John Faber the Younger in 1753, after David Morier (initials of the artists).

The most famous horse portrait by David Morier is that of the Godolphin Arabian. The horse, one of three stallions that founded the modern Thoroughbred, was named after his best-known owner, Francis Godolphin, 2nd Earl of Godolphin. Morier's portrait of the Arabian horse was engraved by John Faber the Younger in 1753 and copied by George Stubbs.

The painting shows the Godolphin Arabian, standing in profile, in a grassy yard enclosed by a high brick wall, with a stable to the right, the door open, and the stable cat, named Grimalkin, sitting on the ground looking at the horse. David Morier's portrait of the Godolphin Arabian is the only painting of this famous horse painted from life. The painting is on display at Houghton Hall.

=== Soldier portraits ===
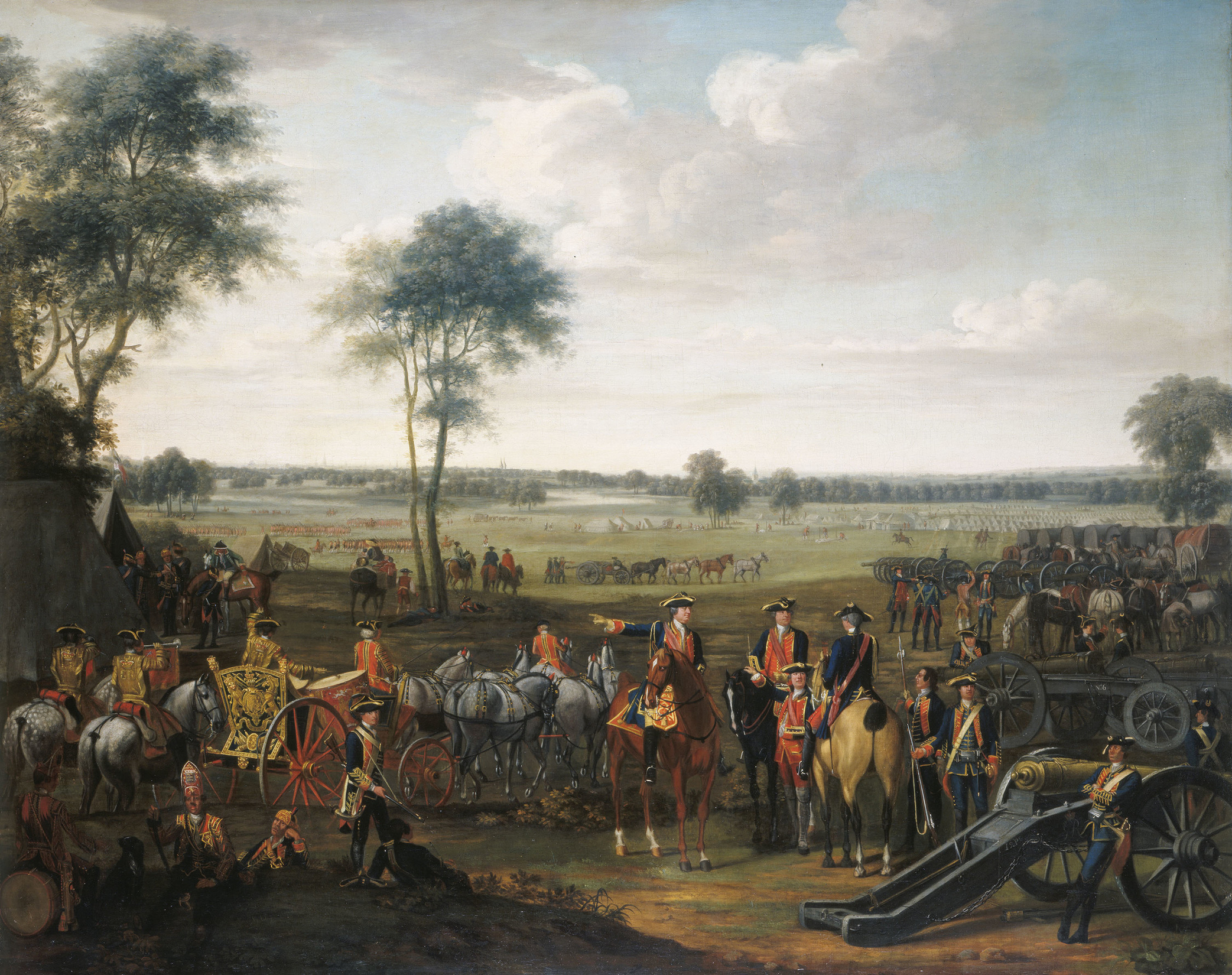
An Encampment of British Troops (Royal Artillery) under the command of the Duke of Cumberland in the Low Countries, by David Morer.

David Morier is well known for his soldier portraits, where he placed great emphasis on accurately depicting the details of their uniforms, as well as he did in his equestrian portraits with the horse tack. In 1747, Morier accompanied the Duke of Cumberland to the Low Countries, where he painted portraits of soldiers of the Royal Artillery and a series of sixty paintings of the allied troops under the duke's command. Today, these paintings are all in the Royal Collection.

==== The British uniform regulations of 1751 ====
In 1751, the first British uniform regulations were issued by royal warrant and David Morier, commissioned by the Duke of Cumberland, began another series of portraits of soldiers, including the light dragoon regiments raised in 1759 and 1760. It was these soldier portraits, in particular the so-called Grenadier Paintings, for which David Morier became famous.

=== The Grenadier Paintings ===
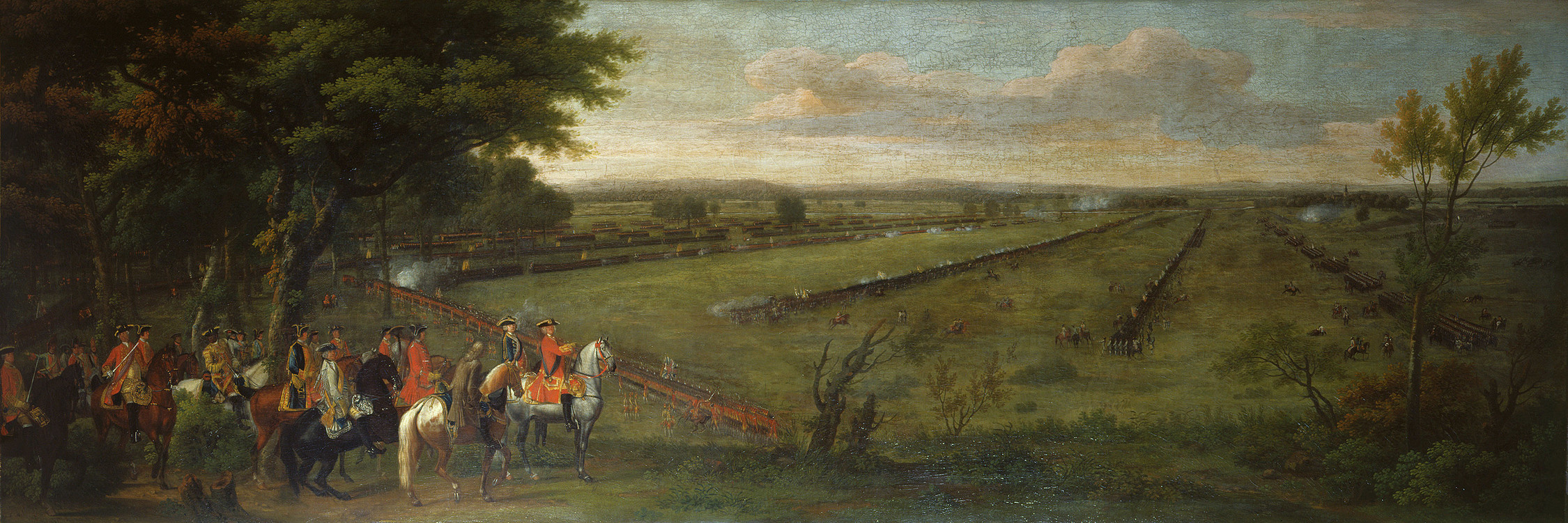
The Battle of Dettingen on 27 June 1743, showing King George II on horseback on a gray horse. The rider next to the king in the blue frock is most likely his son, Prince William, Duke of Cumberland. Painted by David Morier.

The Grenadier Paintings are large panels, depicting the uniforms and the equipment of each of the – at that time – 49 regiments of marching infantry, plus the three regiments of the Guards infantry. On each panel three grenadier privates of three different regiments are portrayed, in numerical order and in a variety of poses, from formal drill to route march order. Morier painted the Grenadier Paintings between 1751 and circa 1760. Once again, David Morier's care and attention to detail have provided a very valuable record of the British Armed Forces material culture in this period.

=== A visual record for the Duke of Cumberland ===
When David Morier had finished the Grenadier Paintings, the Duke of Cumberland had a visual record of every regular British regiment that had ever come under his command. When the duke died in 1765, his second residence, Cranbourne Lodge, housed 106 of Morier's soldier portraits, including paintings of the allied troops that were once under the duke's command. The duke's appreciation for Morier's work went so far, that only paintings by David Morier hung in his picture gallery.

=== An Incident in the Rebellion of 1745 ===
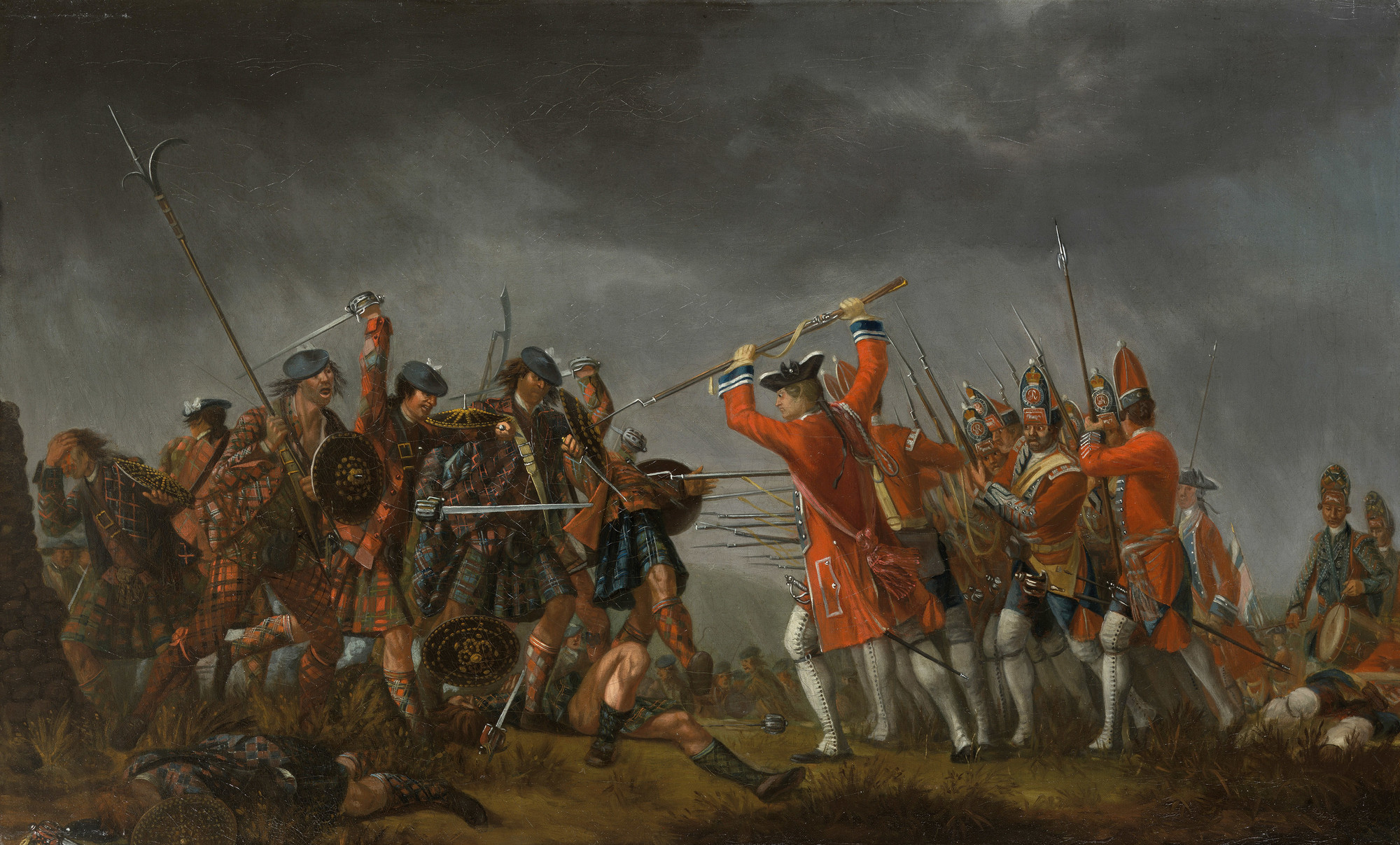
An Incident in the Rebellion of 1745, by David Morier.

David Morier's most recognisable work is An Incident in the Rebellion of 1745. The painting depicts the Highland charge at the climax of the Battle of Culloden, when the charging Highlanders faced off against Col. Barrell's 4th Regiment of Foot.

==== Painted from life and possibly from the battlefield ====
David Morier accompanied the Duke of Cumberland's army to Scotland, and while he may have been an eye-witness at the Battle of Culloden, the subject of his famous painting, he did have the opportunity to make sketches of the clothing and arms of the Jacobite prisoners in the aftermath. The painting remains one of the best contemporary source on the material culture of both: the British and the Jacobite forces in this conflict. The painting now hangs in the King's Ante-Chamber of the Palace of Holyroodhouse.

== Later years and death ==
In 1757, the Duke of Cumberland's military career was ended by his disgrace following his defeat at the Battle of Hastenbeck and his subsequent signing of the Convention of Klosterzeven. After the duke lost his position, also David Morier's career went into decline. Morier appears to have lost his patronage either then, or at the duke's death in 1765. He was jailed for debt in the Fleet prison in 1769 and died there in January the next year. His colleagues of the Society of Artists paid to have him buried at St. James's Church, Clerkenwell on 8 January 1770.

== Exhibitions ==
A founder member of the Society of Artists, David Morier exhibited at its first exhibition in 1760, and again in 1762, 1765, and 1768, sending equestrian portraits, and in the last year a painting titled An Old Horse and the Farmer.

== Legacy ==
David Morier's legacy endures through his influence on the portrayal of military history in art. His contributions to military art are significant, as his works provide invaluable visual evidence of 18th-century warfare. His attention to detail and careful depiction of military uniforms and equipment have made his paintings important historical documents.

Aside from his military works, Morier also painted landscapes and portraits. His works are held in various collections, including the Royal Collection and the National Army Museum.

== Gallery I: The Grenadier Paintings – 49 regiments of marching infantry + the three regiments of the Guards infantry ==
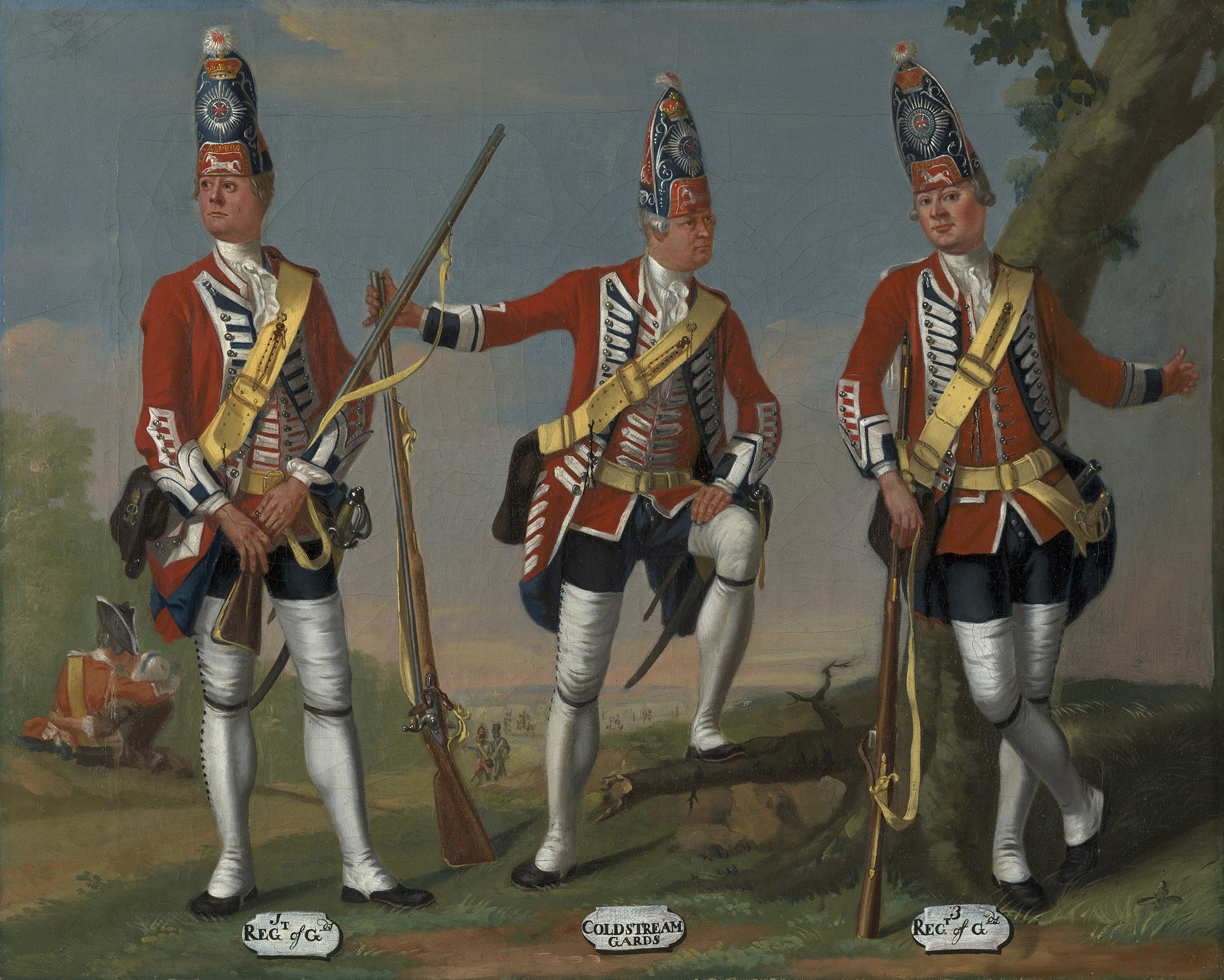
Grenadiers, 1st and 3rd Regiments of Foot Guards and Coldstream Guards

Grenadiers, 1st Royal, 2nd Queen's and 3rd Regiments of Foot

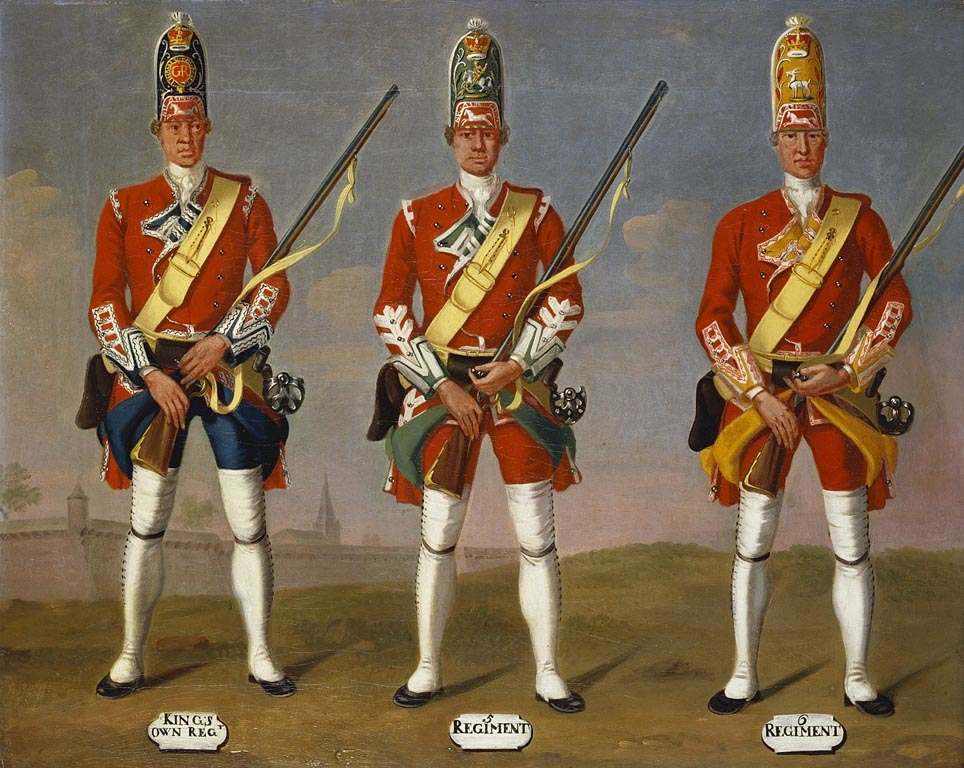
Grenadiers, 4th King's Own, 5th and 6th Regiments of Foot

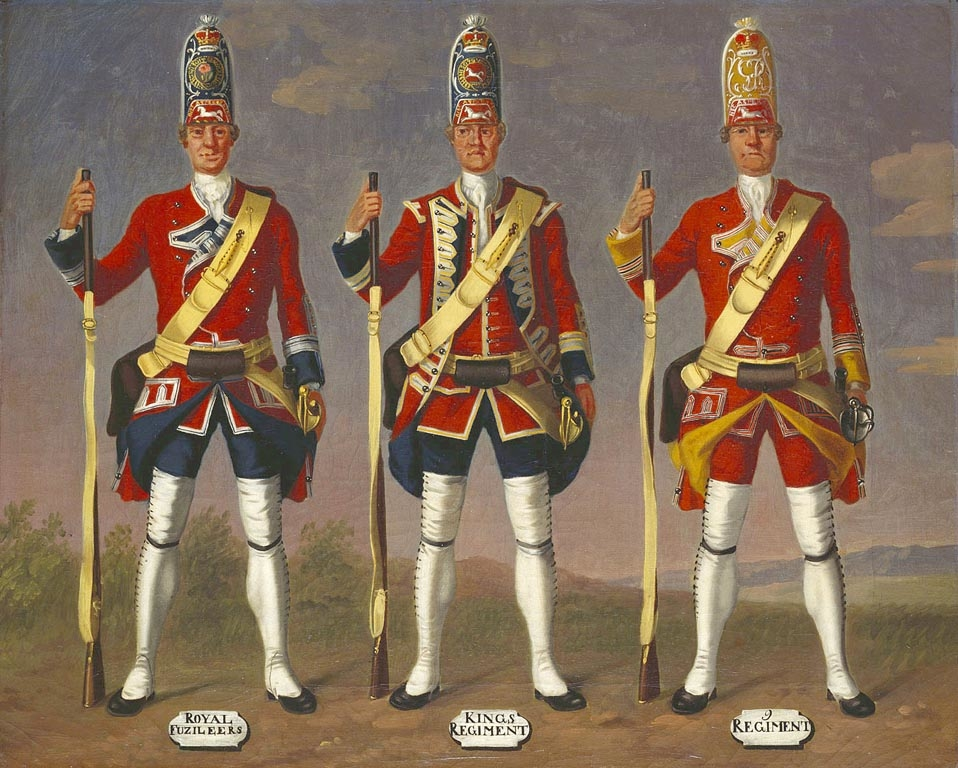
Grenadiers, 7th Royal Fusiliers, 8th King's and 9th Regiments of Foot

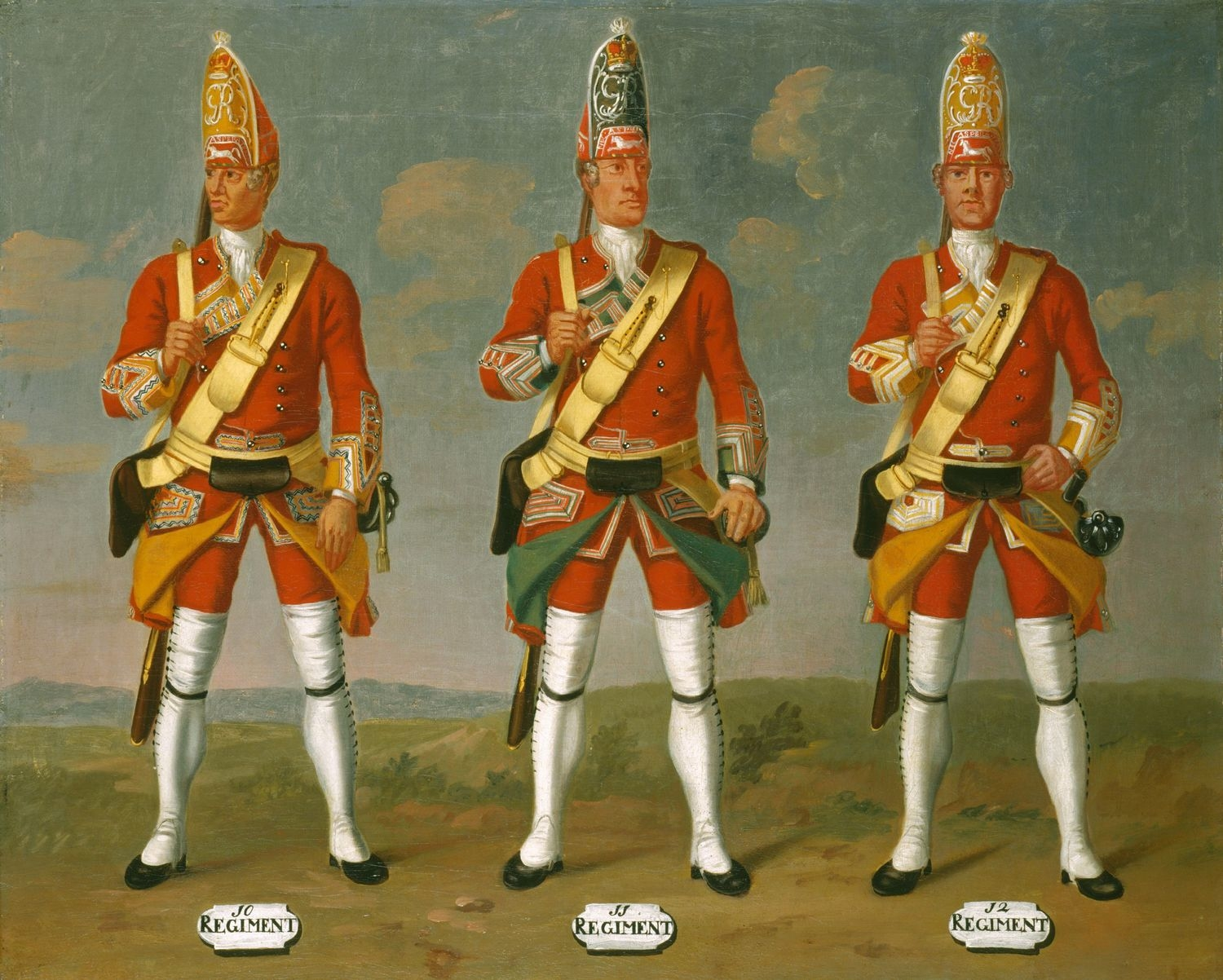
Grenadiers, 10th, 11th and 12th Regiments of Foot

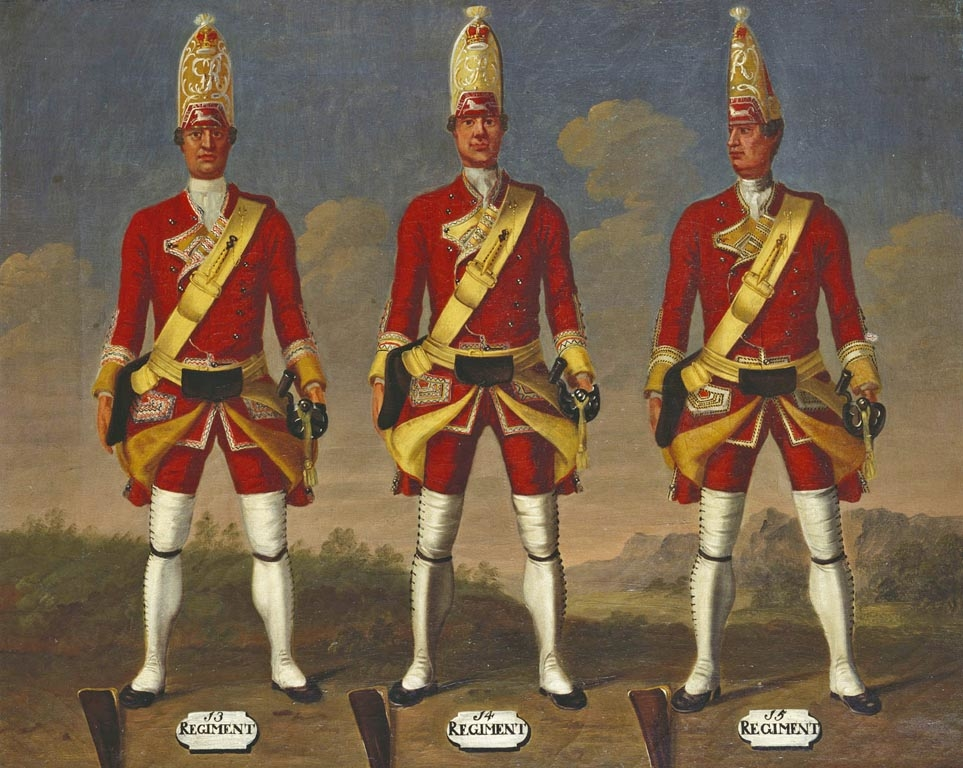
Grenadiers, 13th, 14th and 15th Regiments of Foot

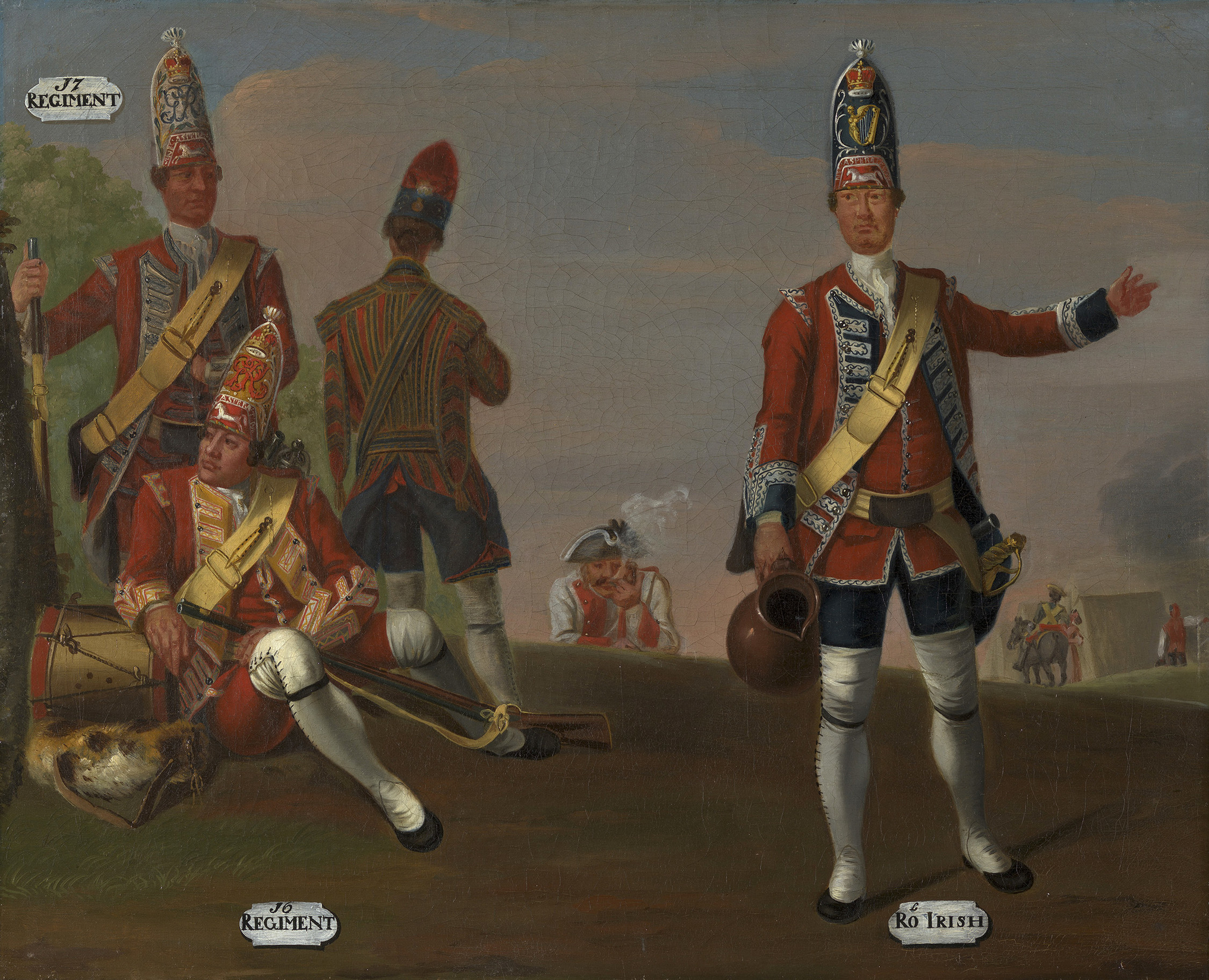
Grenadiers, 16th and 17th Regiments of Foot, and Grenadier and Drummer, 18th Royal Irish Regiment of Foot

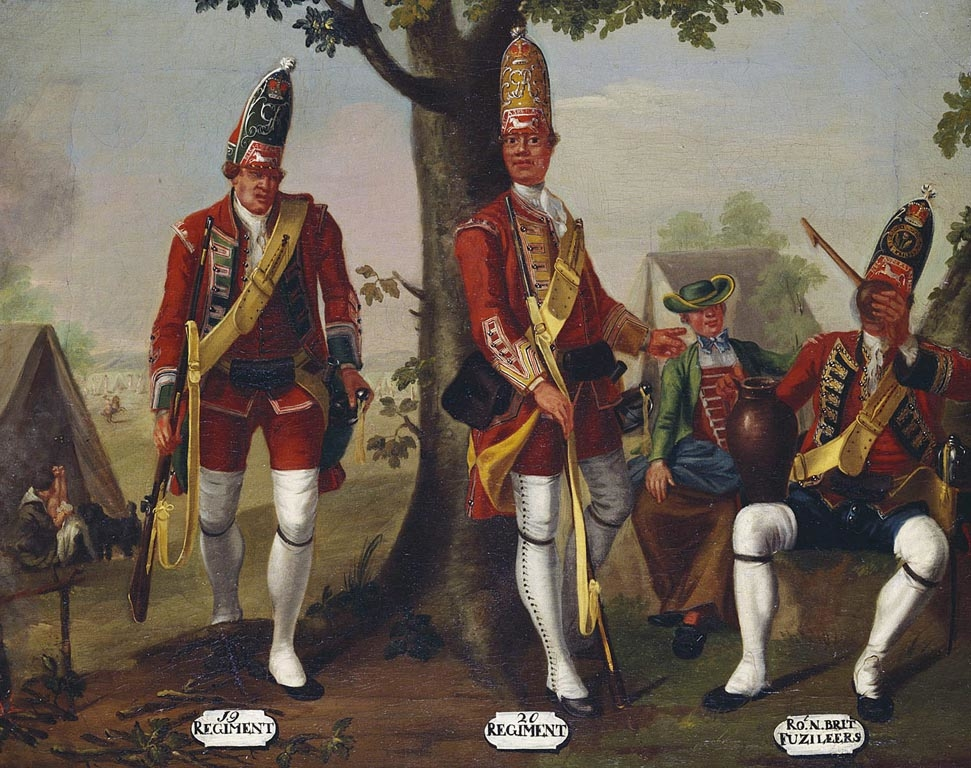
Grenadiers, 19th and 20th Regiments of Foot, and 21st Royal North British Fusiliers

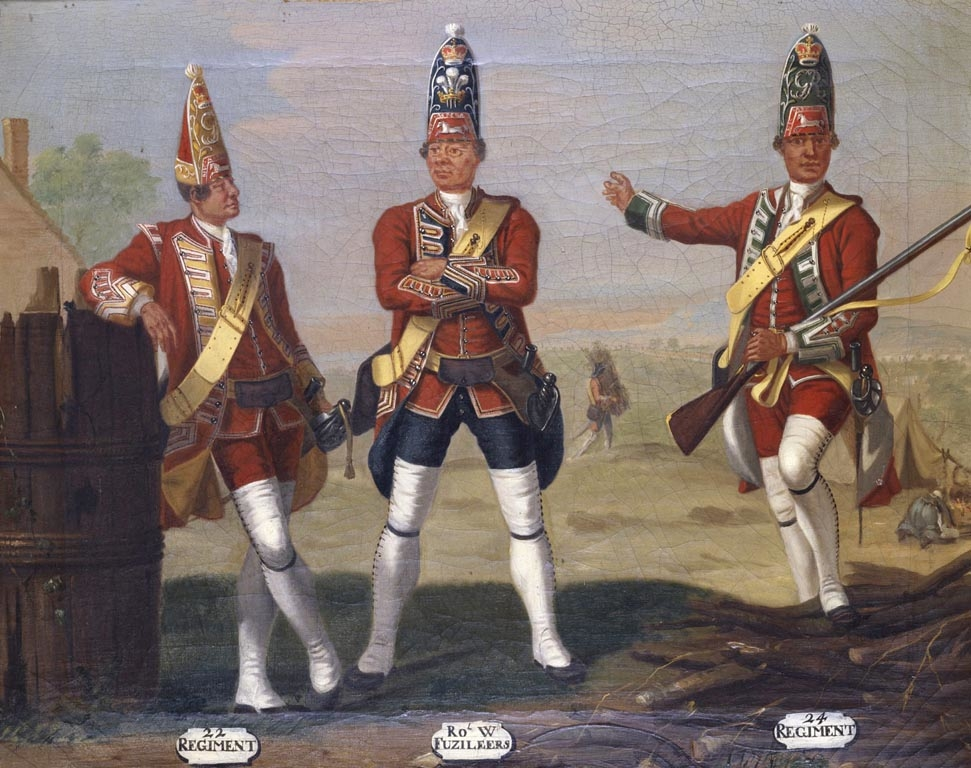
Grenadiers, 22nd and 24th Regiments of Foot, and 23rd Royal Welch Fusiliers

Grenadiers, 25th and 26th Regiments of Foot and 27th Inniskilling Regiment of Foot

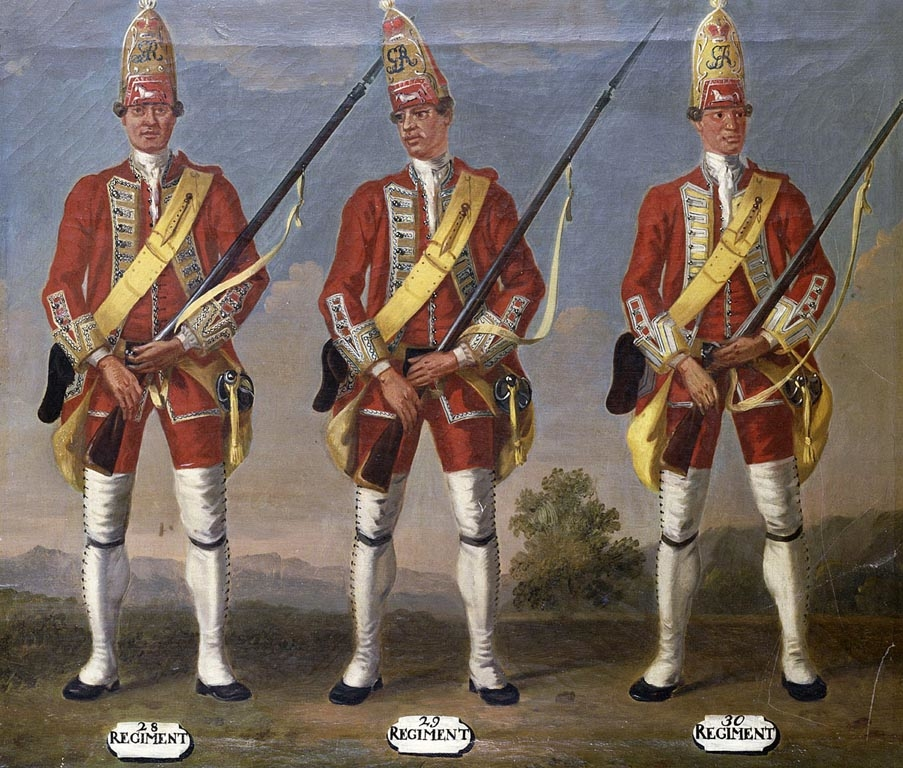
Grenadiers, 28th, 29th and 30th Regiments of Foot

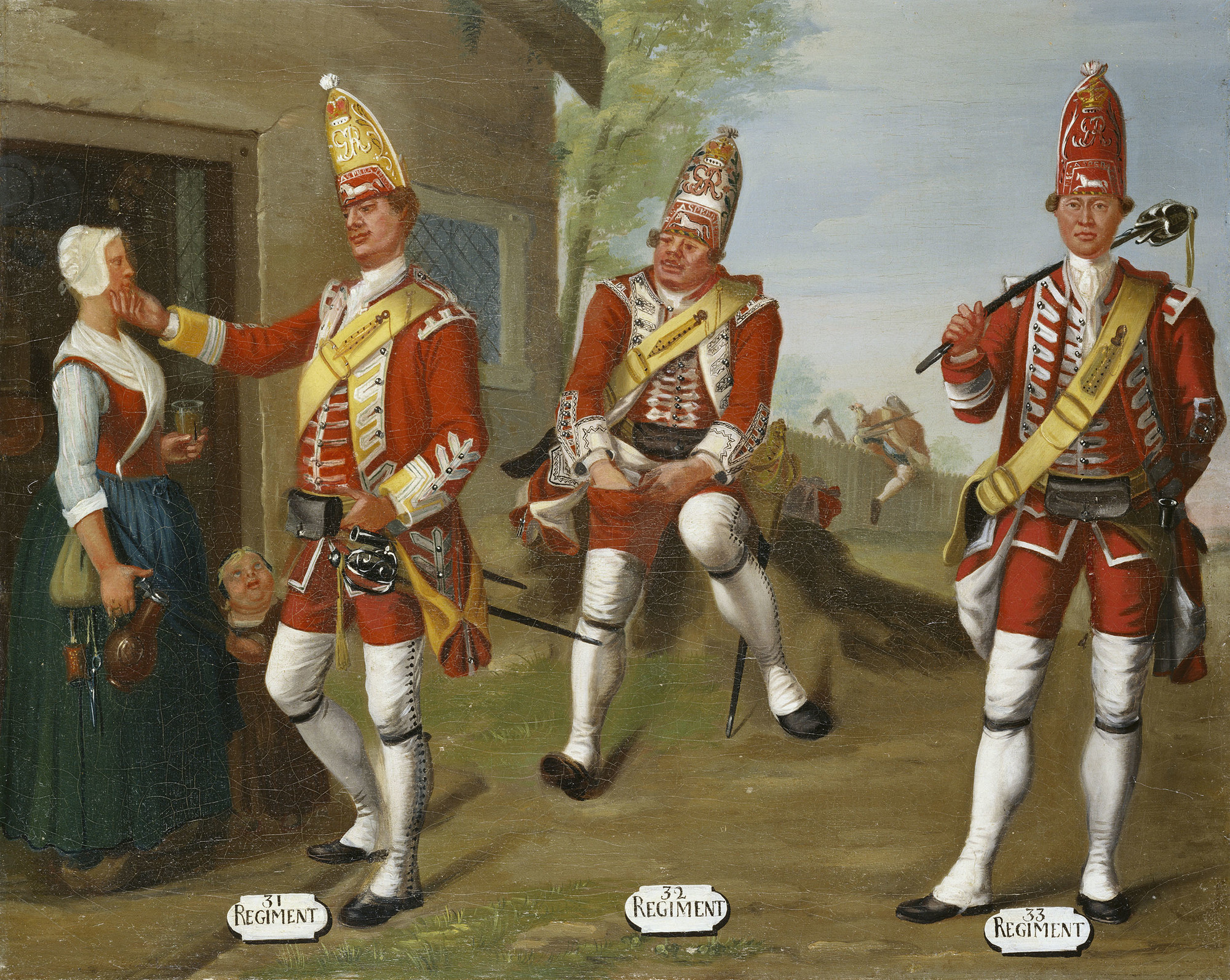
Grenadiers, 31st, 32nd and 33rd Regimants of Foot

Grenadiers, 34th, 35th and 36th Regiments of Foot

Grenadiers, 37th, 38h and 39th Regiments of Foot

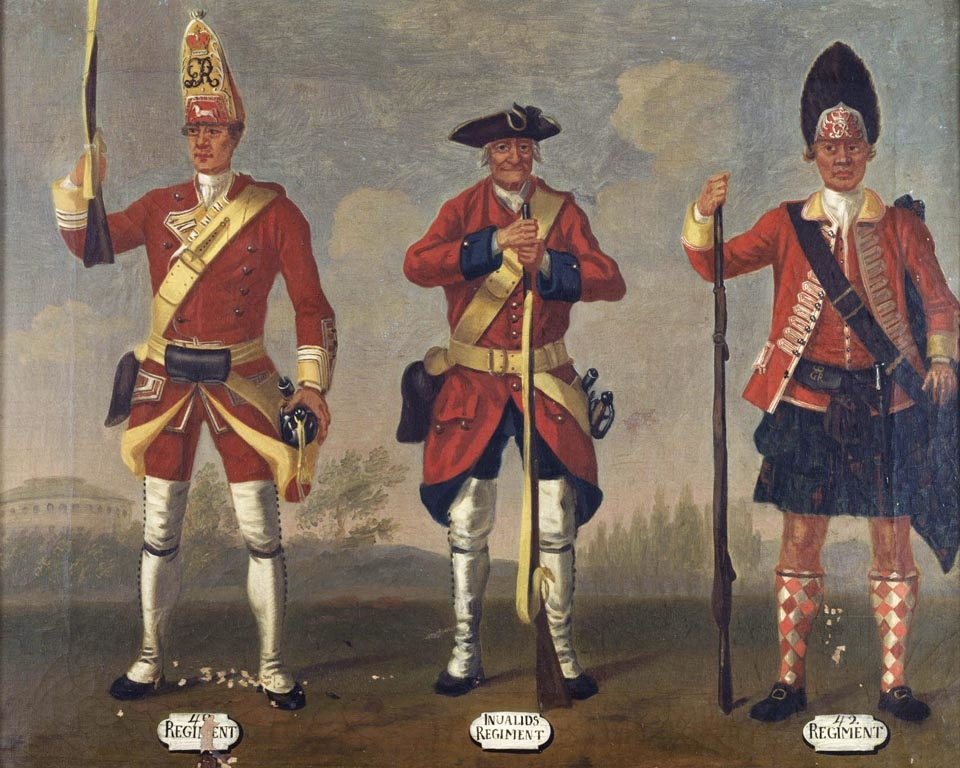
Grenadiers, 40th Regiment of Foot, and Privates, 41st Invalids Regiment and 42nd Highland Regiment

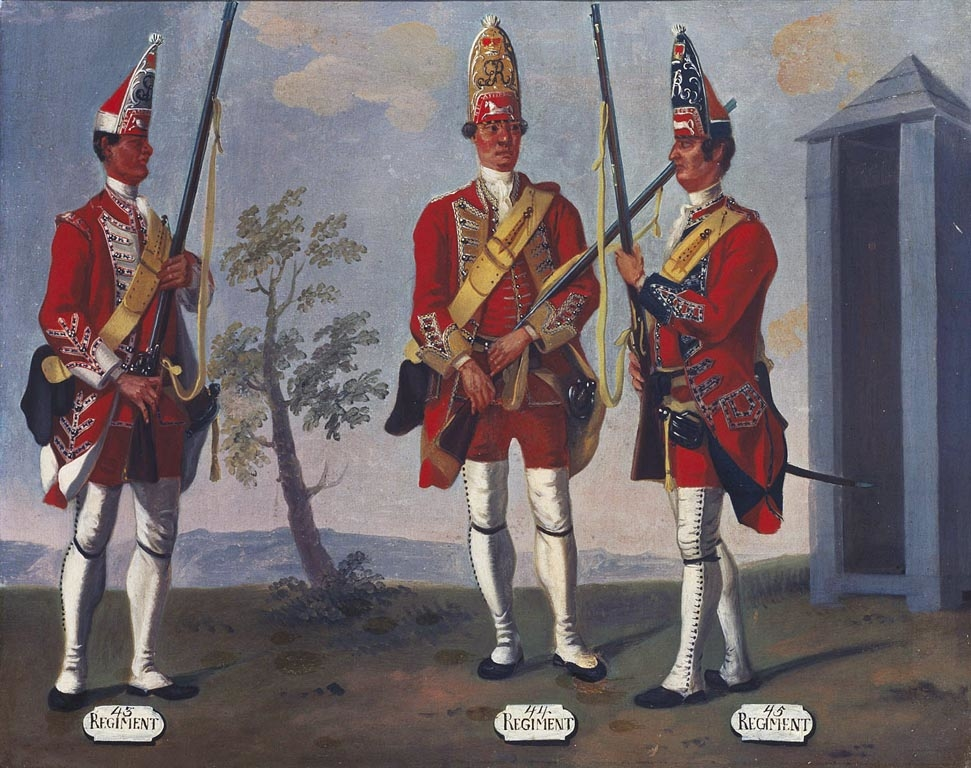
Grenadiers, 43rd, 44th and 45th Regiments of Foot

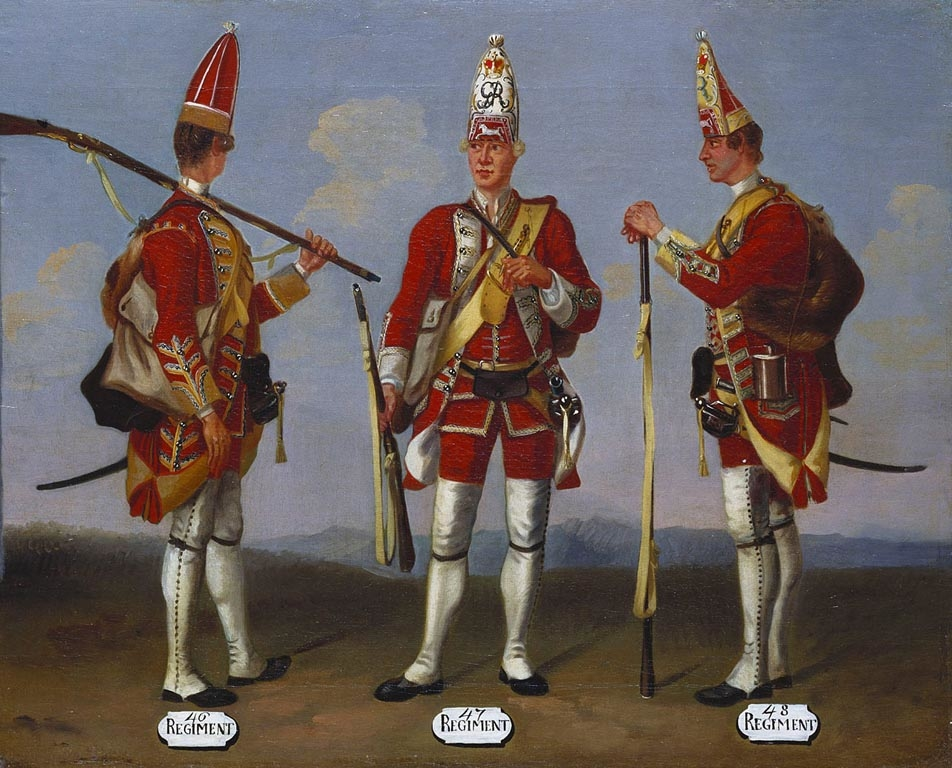
Grenadiers, 46th, 47th and 48th Regiments of Foot

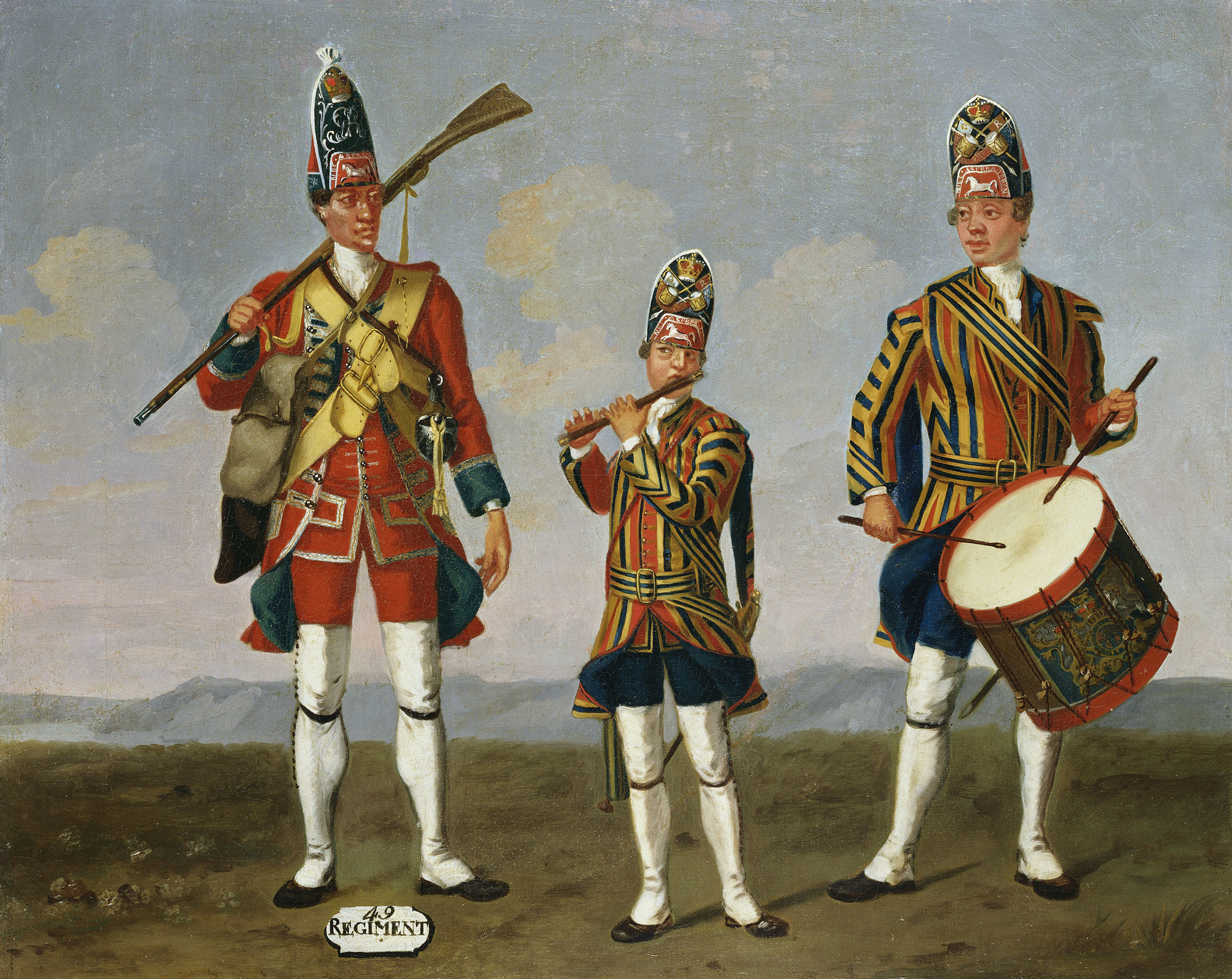
A grenadier of the 49th Regiment and fifer and drummer of the Foot Guards

== Gallery II: Further military paintings ==
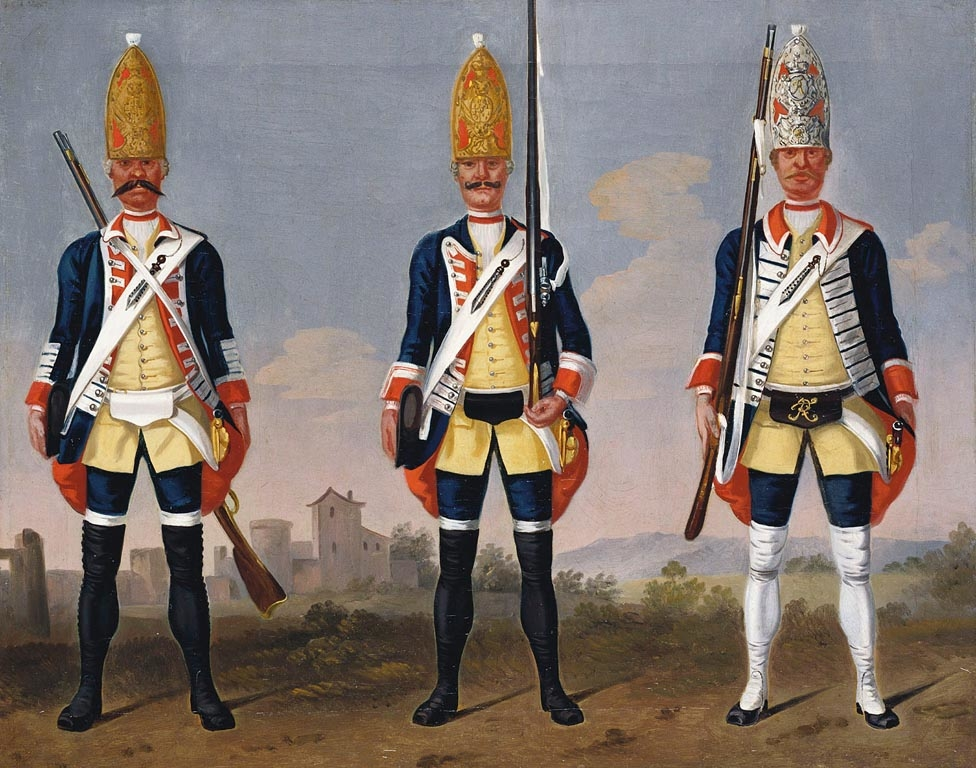
Grenadiers, Grenadier Regiment, Foot Guards and Regiment König

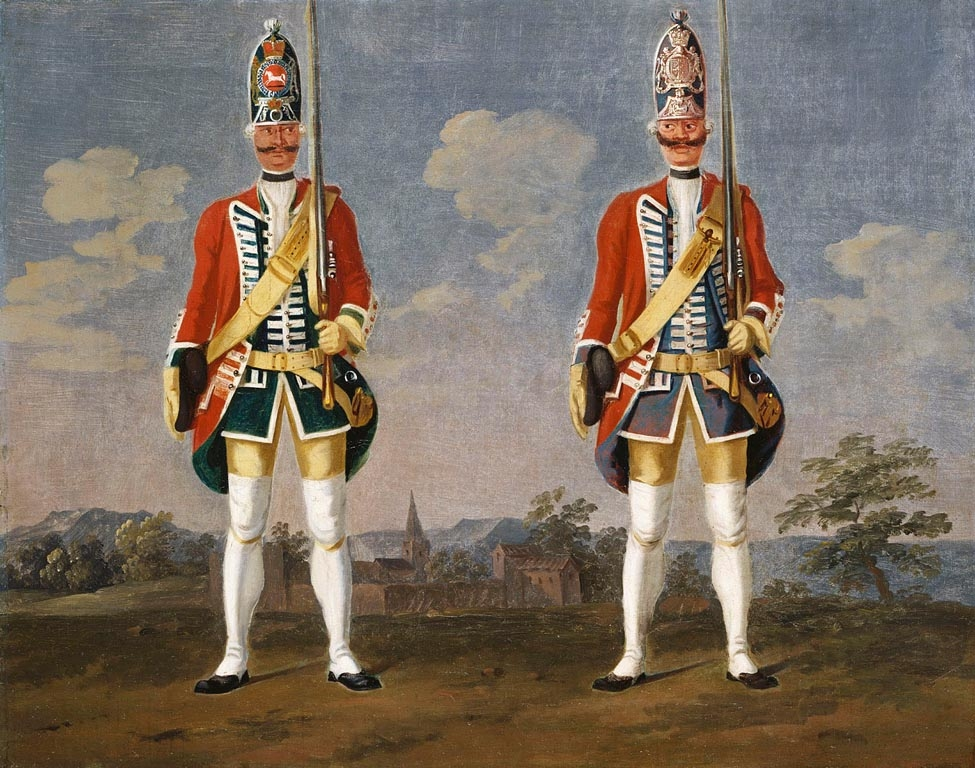
Grenadiers, Infantry Regiments 9B Borch and 12B Brunck

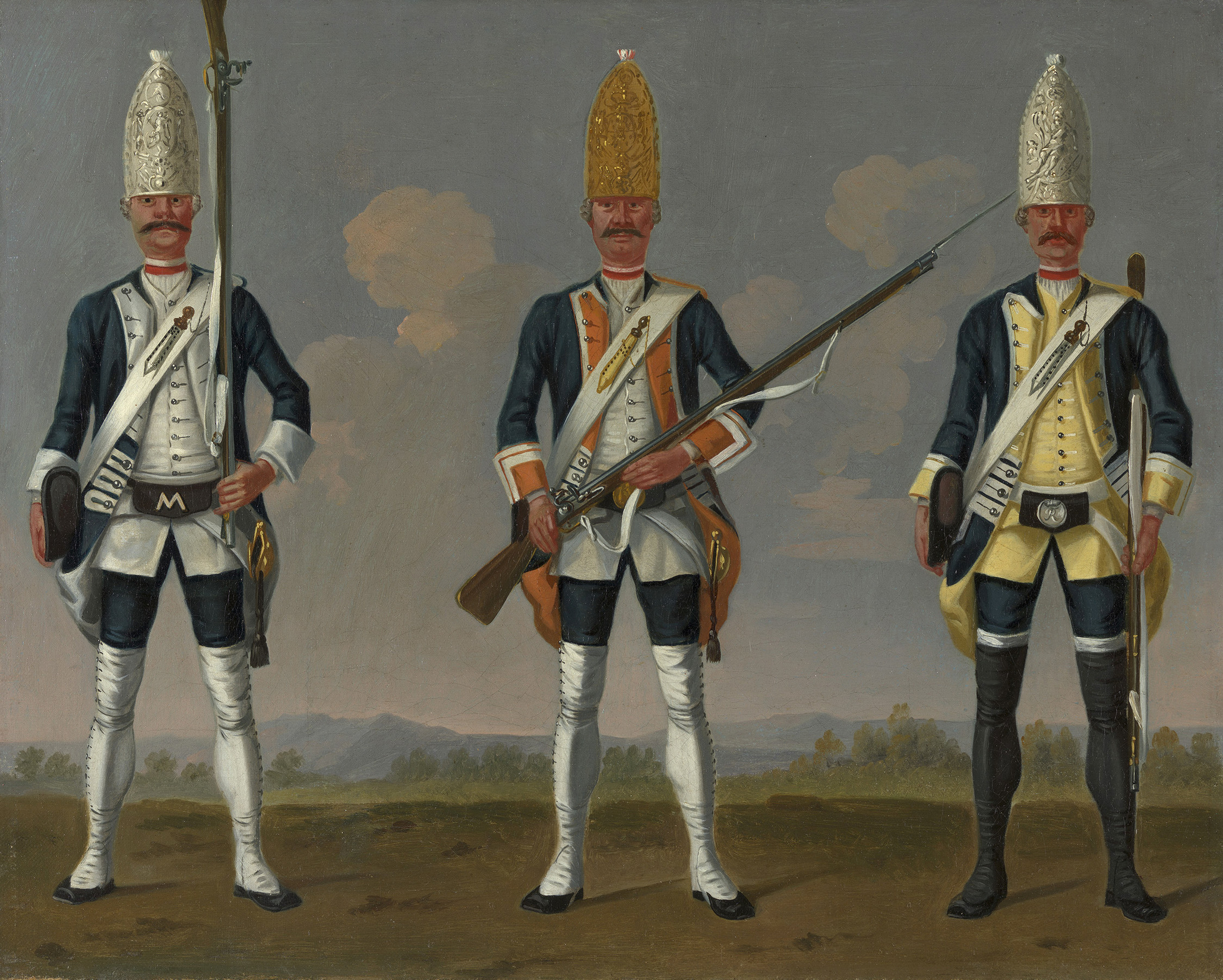
Grenadiers, Infantry Regiments Mansbach, Baumbach and Isenburg

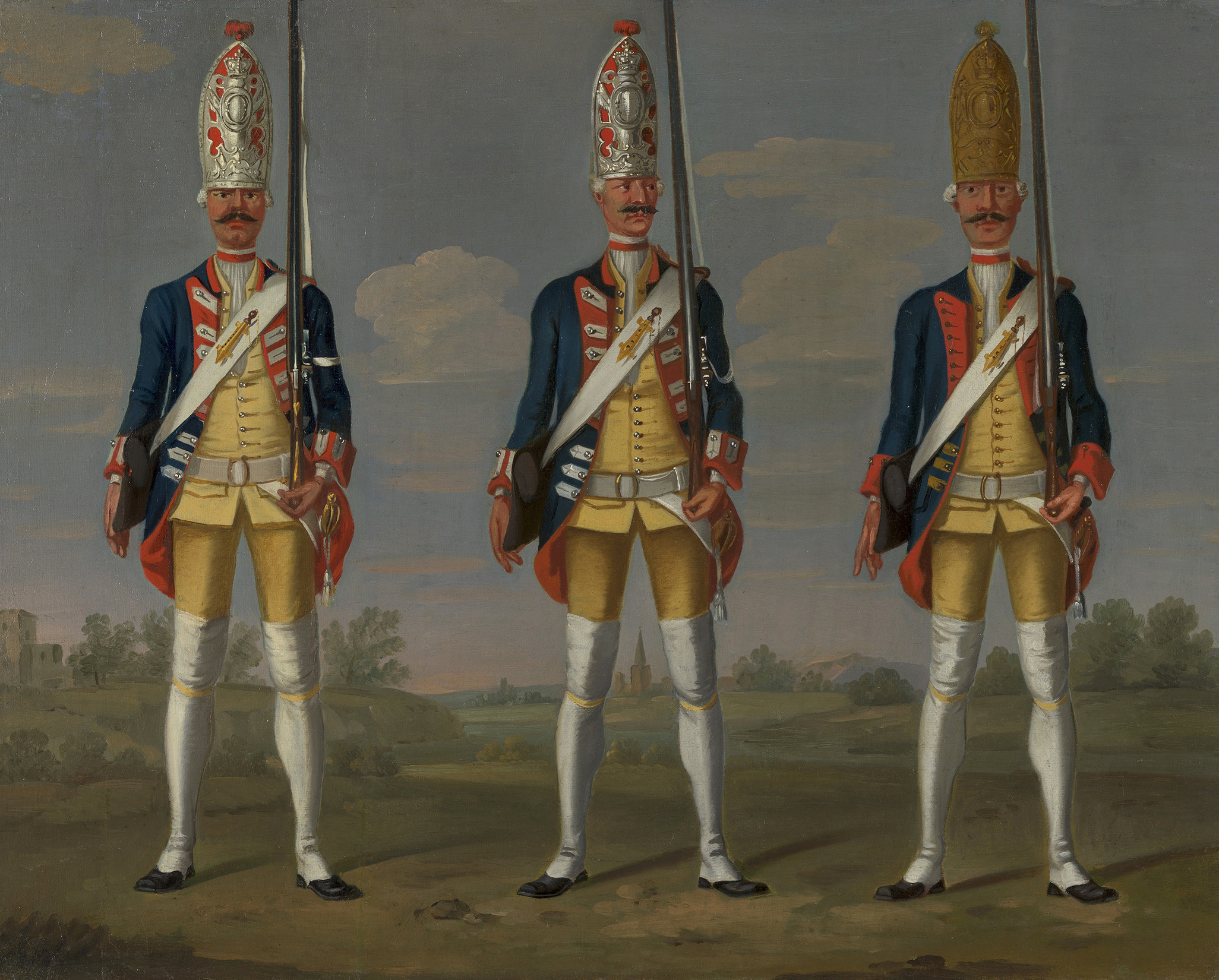
Grenadiers, Infantry Regiments Stammer, Tunderfeld and Both

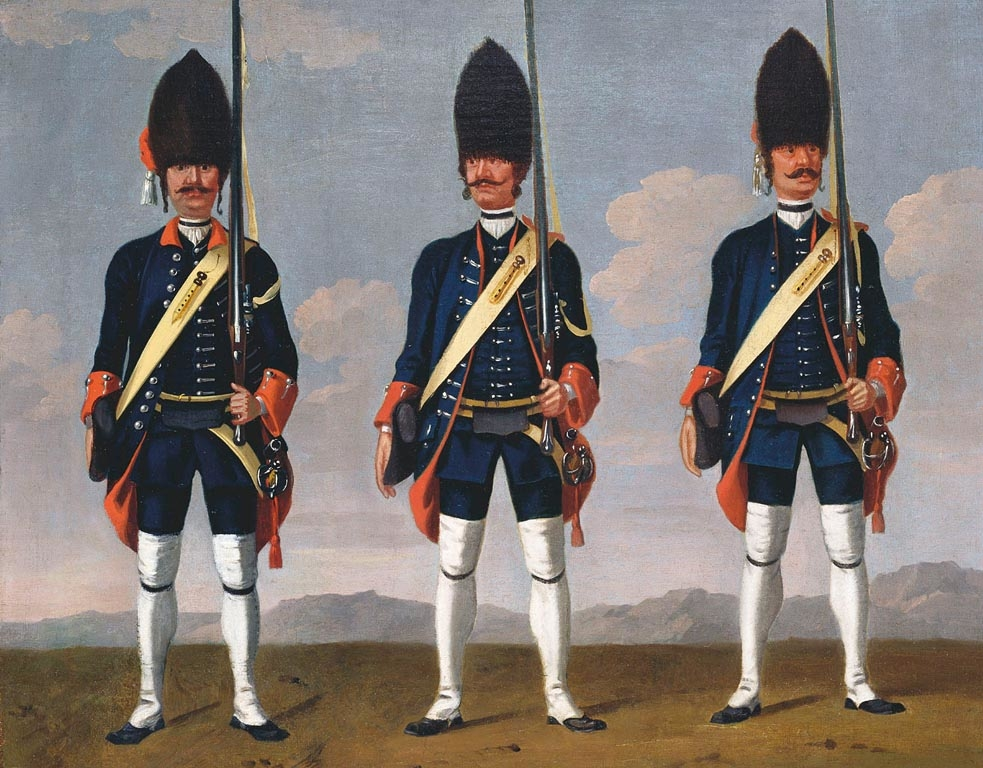
Grenadiers, Swiss Infantry Regiments Hirzel, Constant and Stuerler

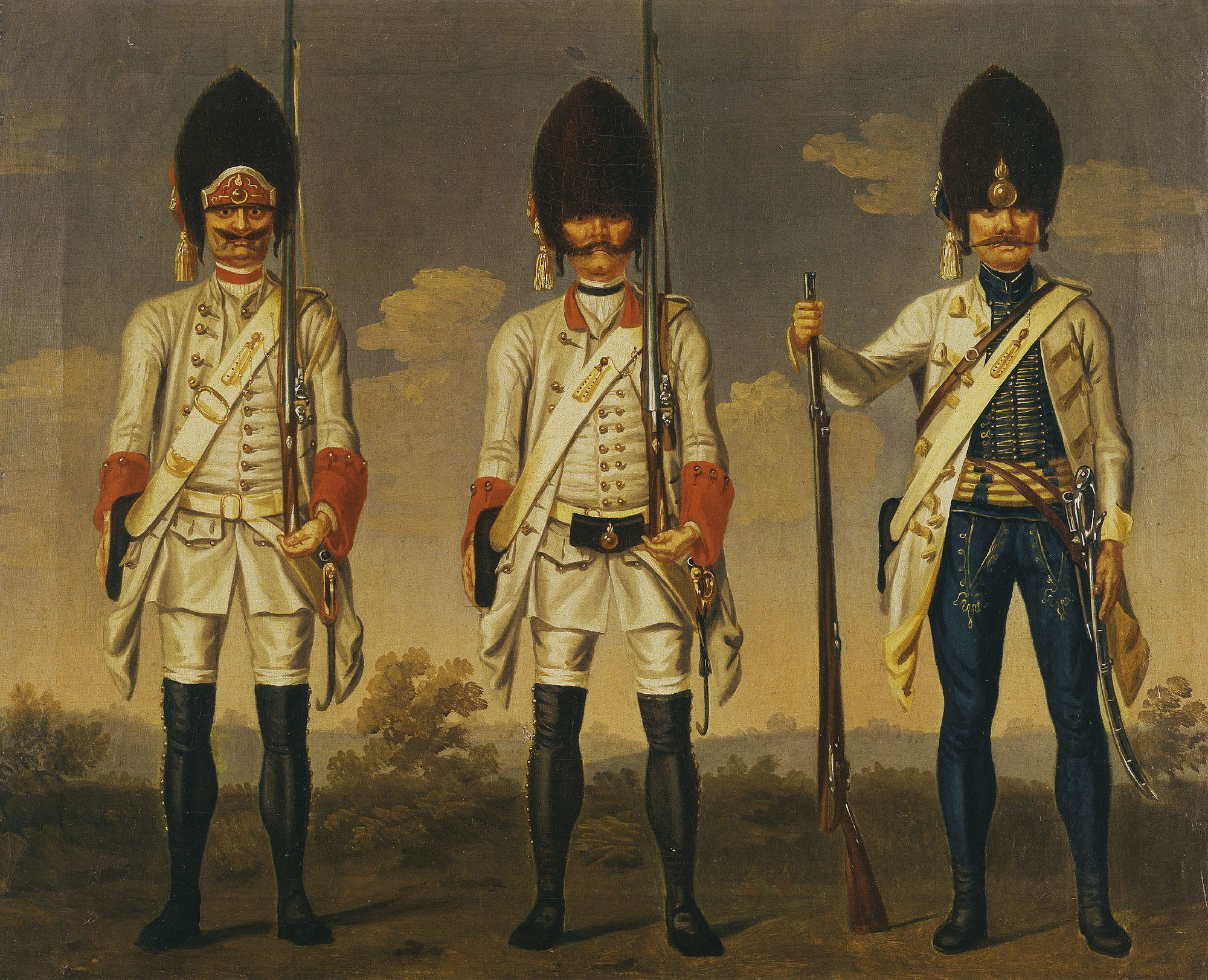
Grenadiers, two unidentified Infantry Regiments and Infantry Regiment Ujvary

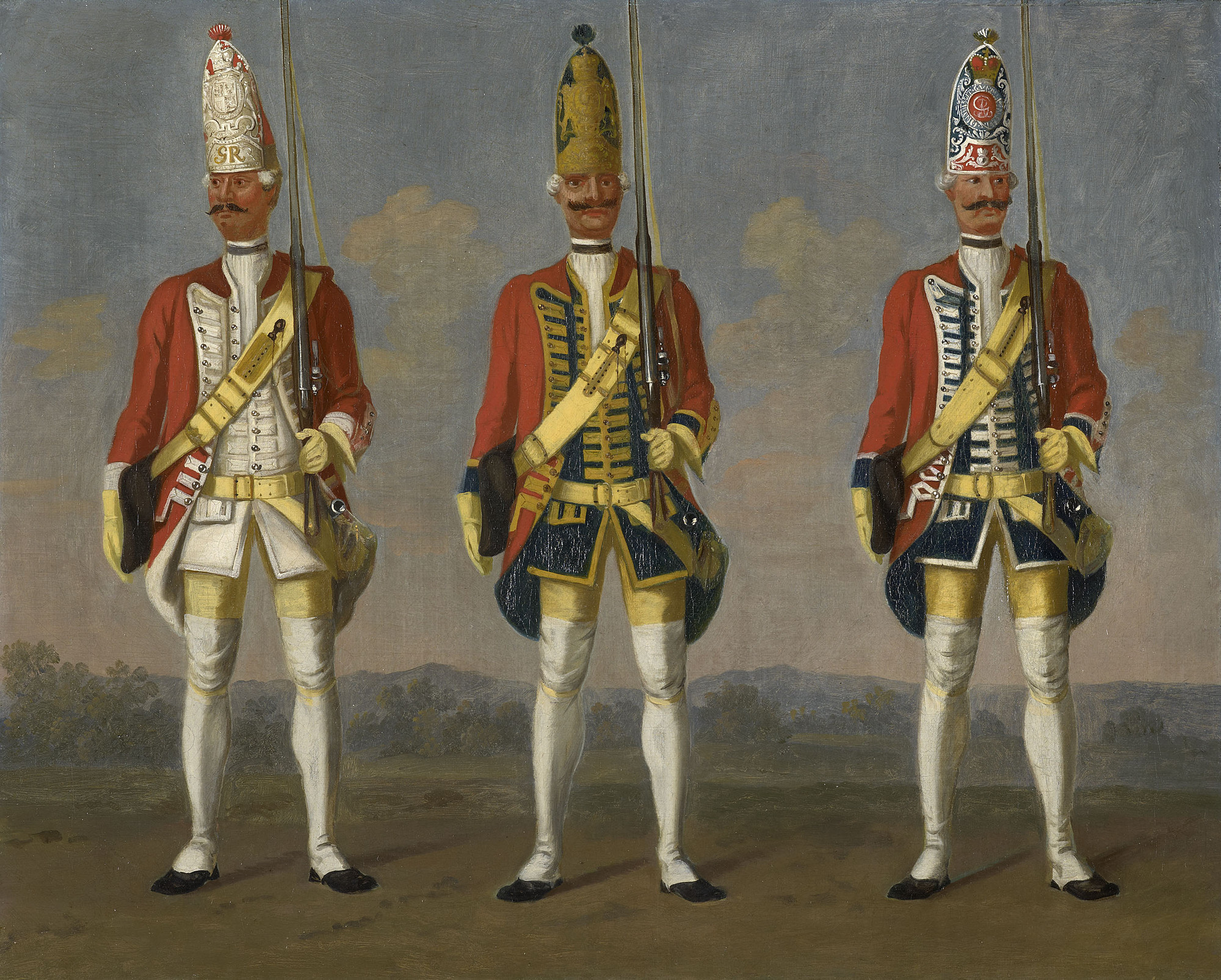
Grenadiers, Infantry Regiments 8B Block, 1A Hattorf and 10A Hammerstein

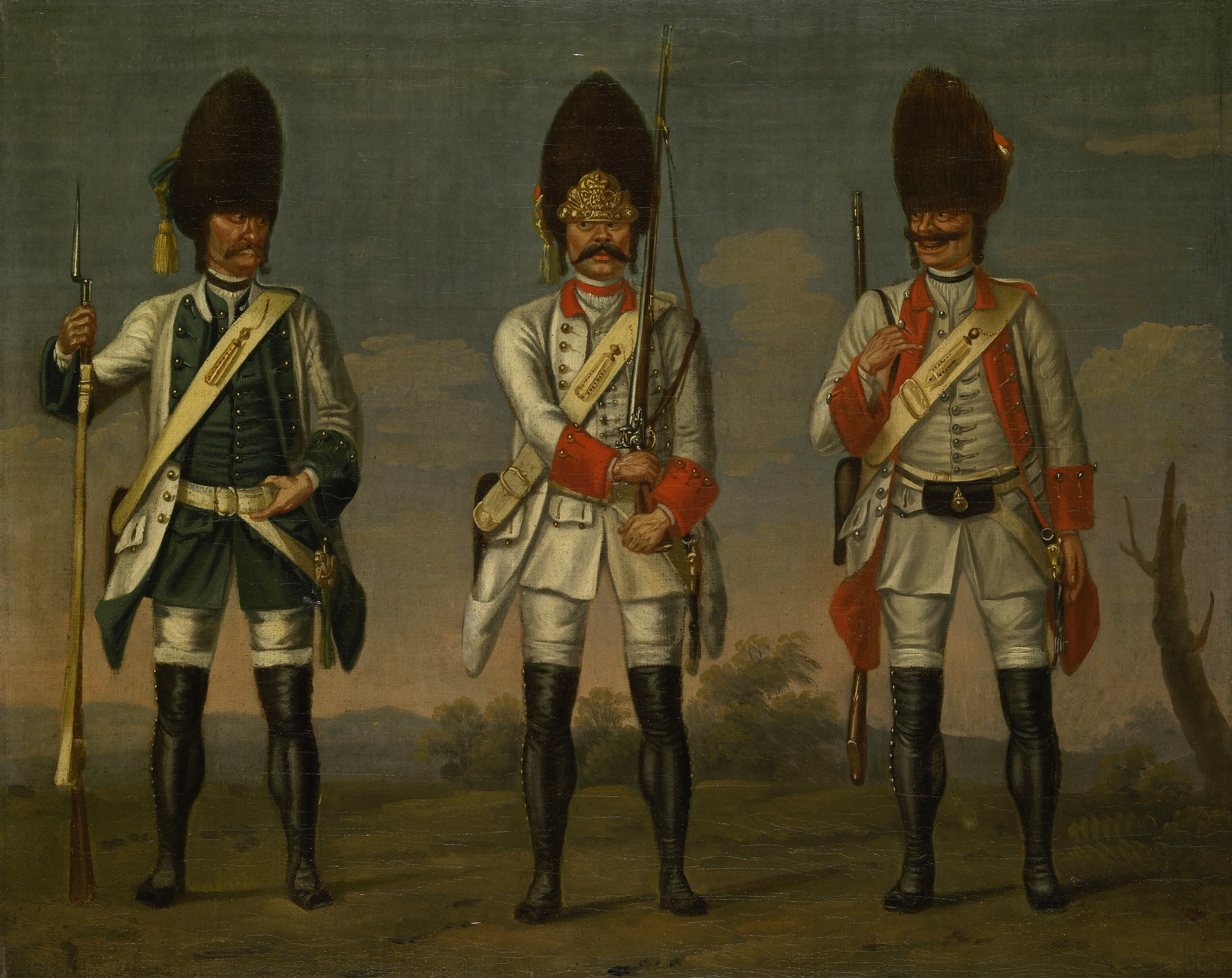
Grenadiers, Infantry Regiments Los Rios, Waldeck and Wurmbrand

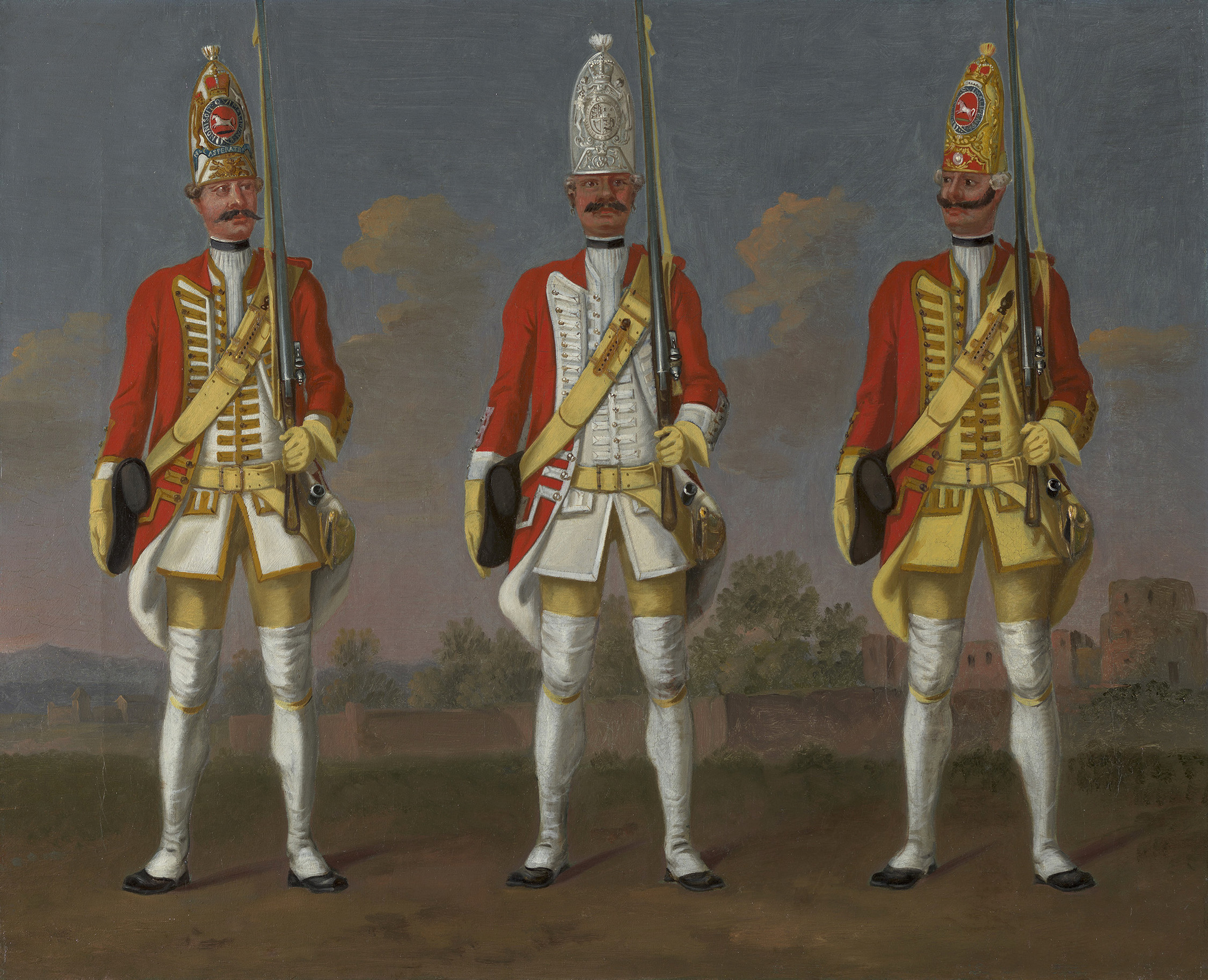
Grenadiers, Infantry Regiments 1B Alt Zastrow, 8A Diepenbroick and 7B Hausz

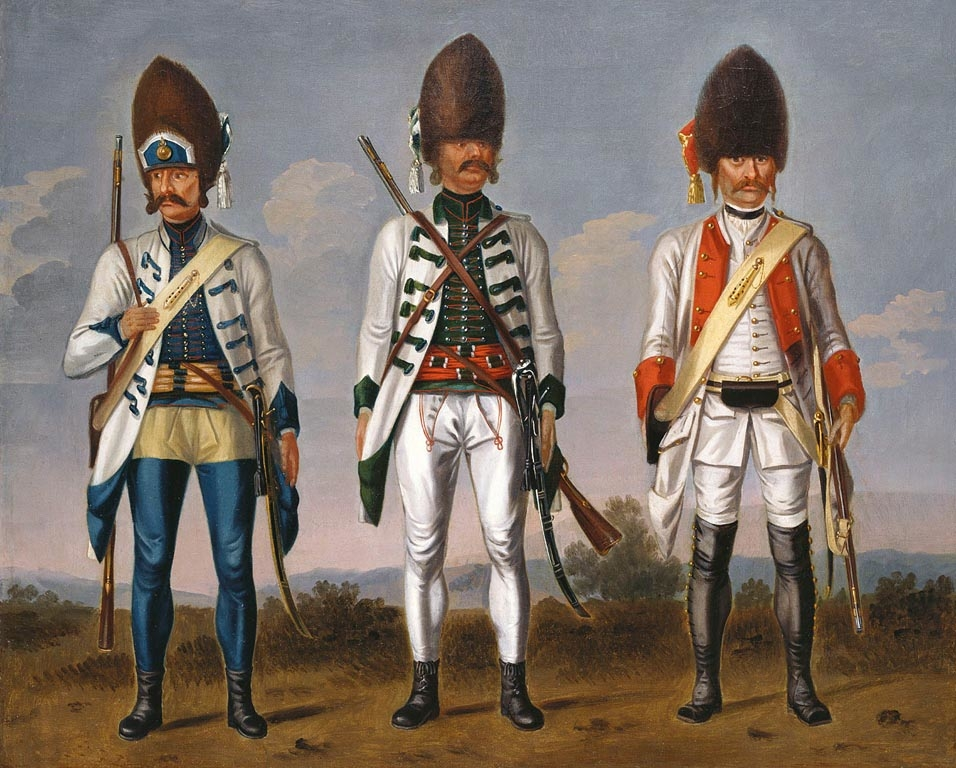
Grenadiers, Hungarian Infantry Regiments Haller, Bethlen and an unidentified Infantry Regiment

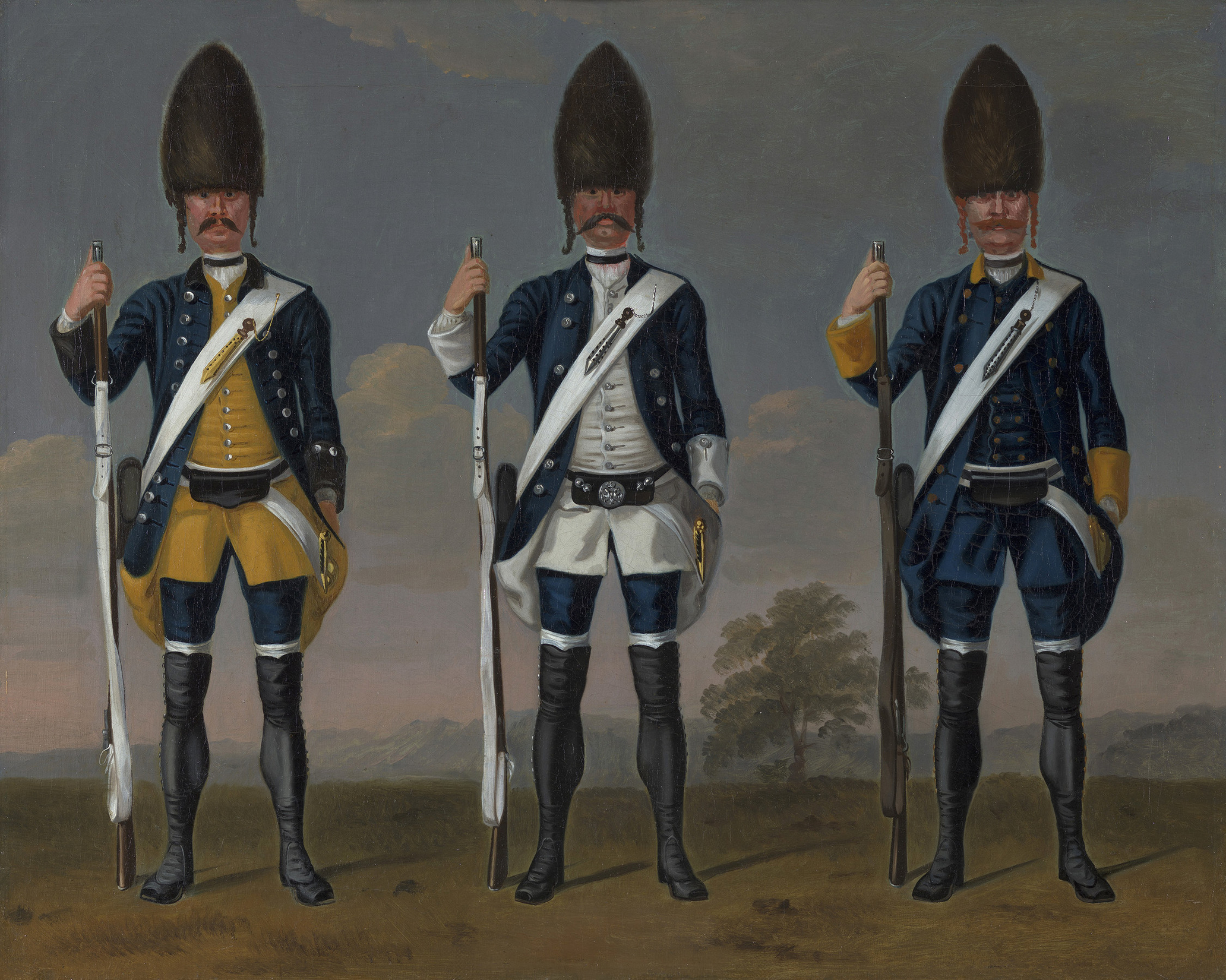
Grenadiers, Infantry Regiment Nyhs, Infantry Battalion Schwartzburg-Sonderhausen and Infantry Regiment During

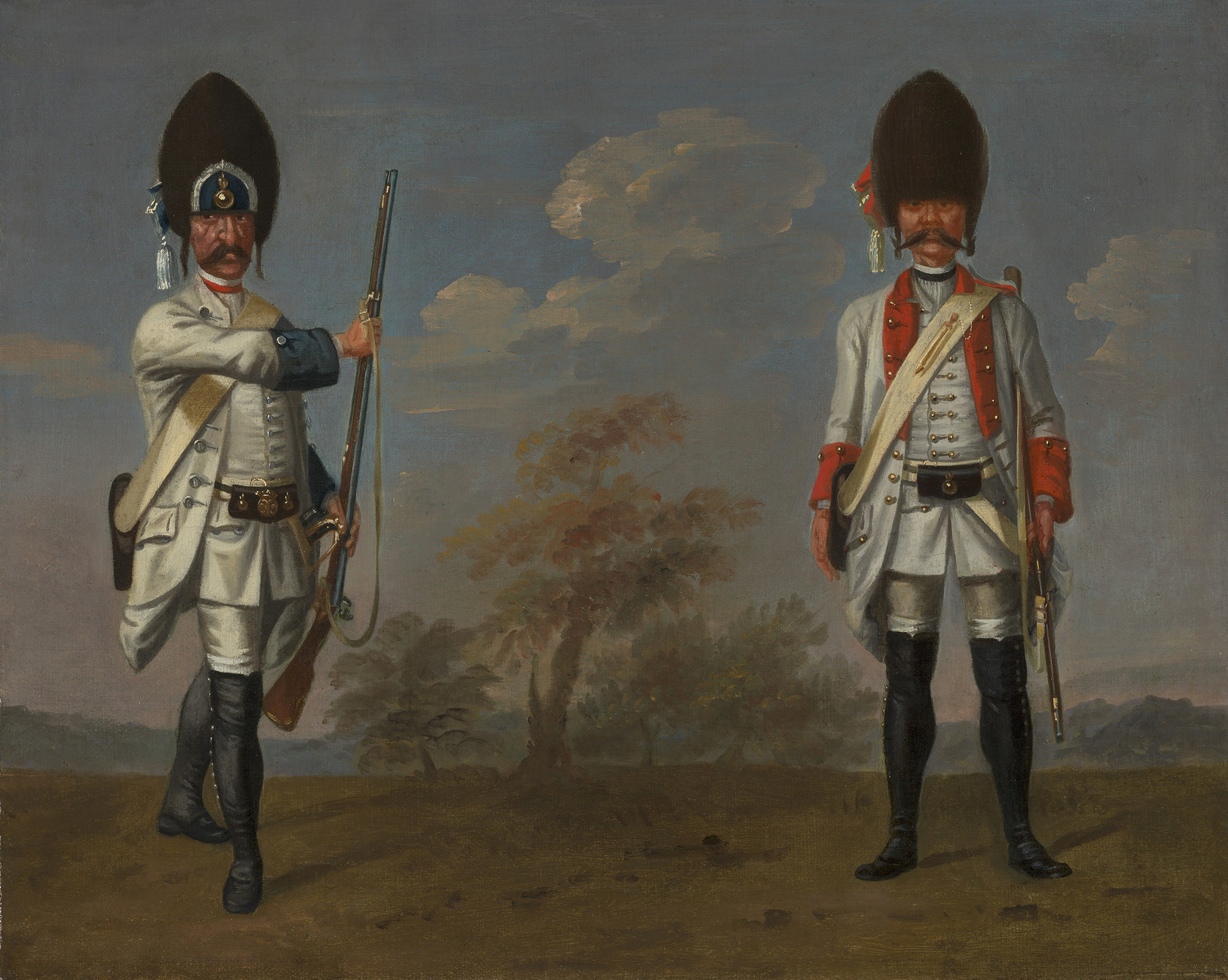
Grenadiers, Infantry Regiment Browne and an unidentified Infantry Regiment

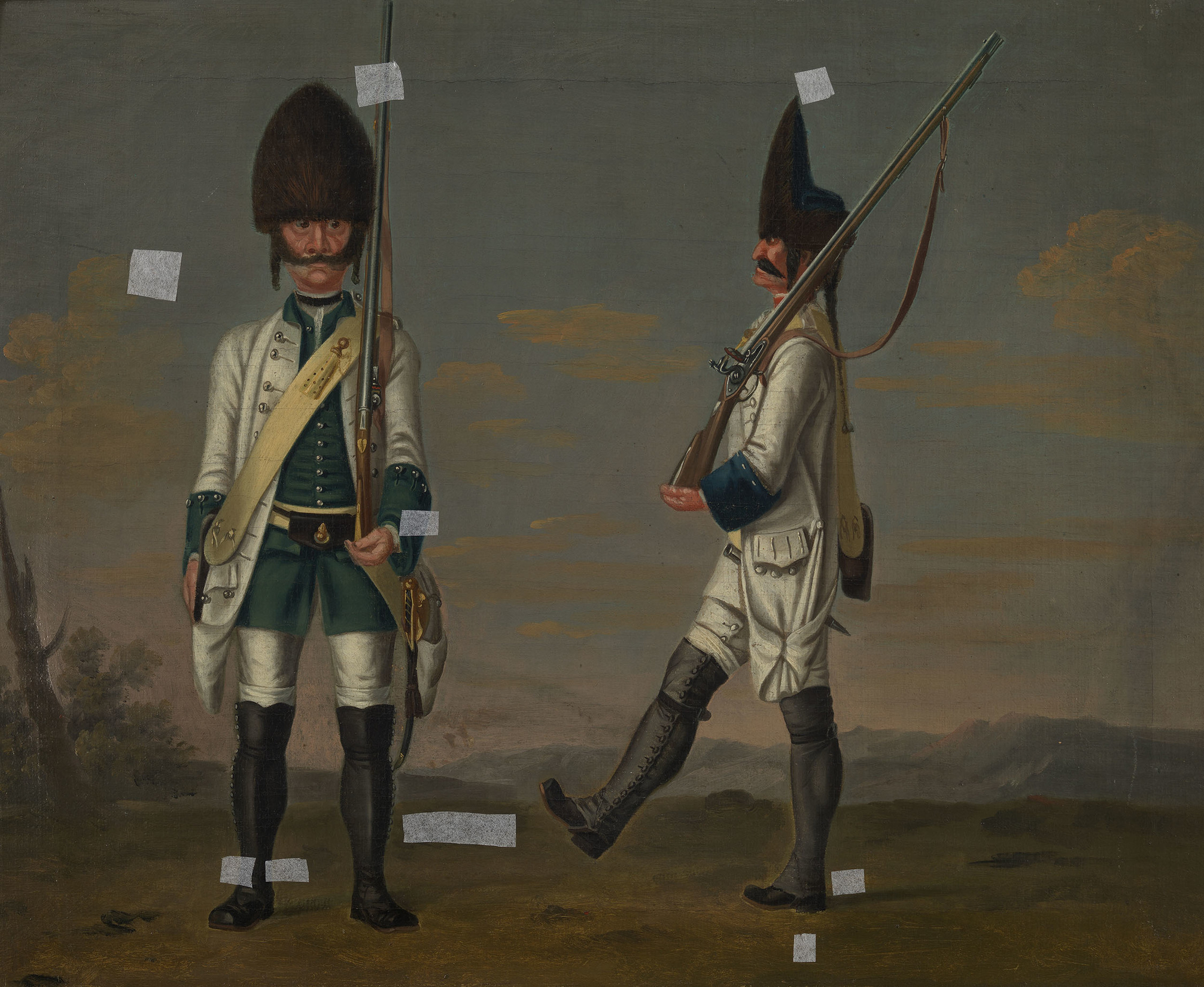
Grenadiers, Infantry Regiment Arenburg and an unidentified Infantry Regiment

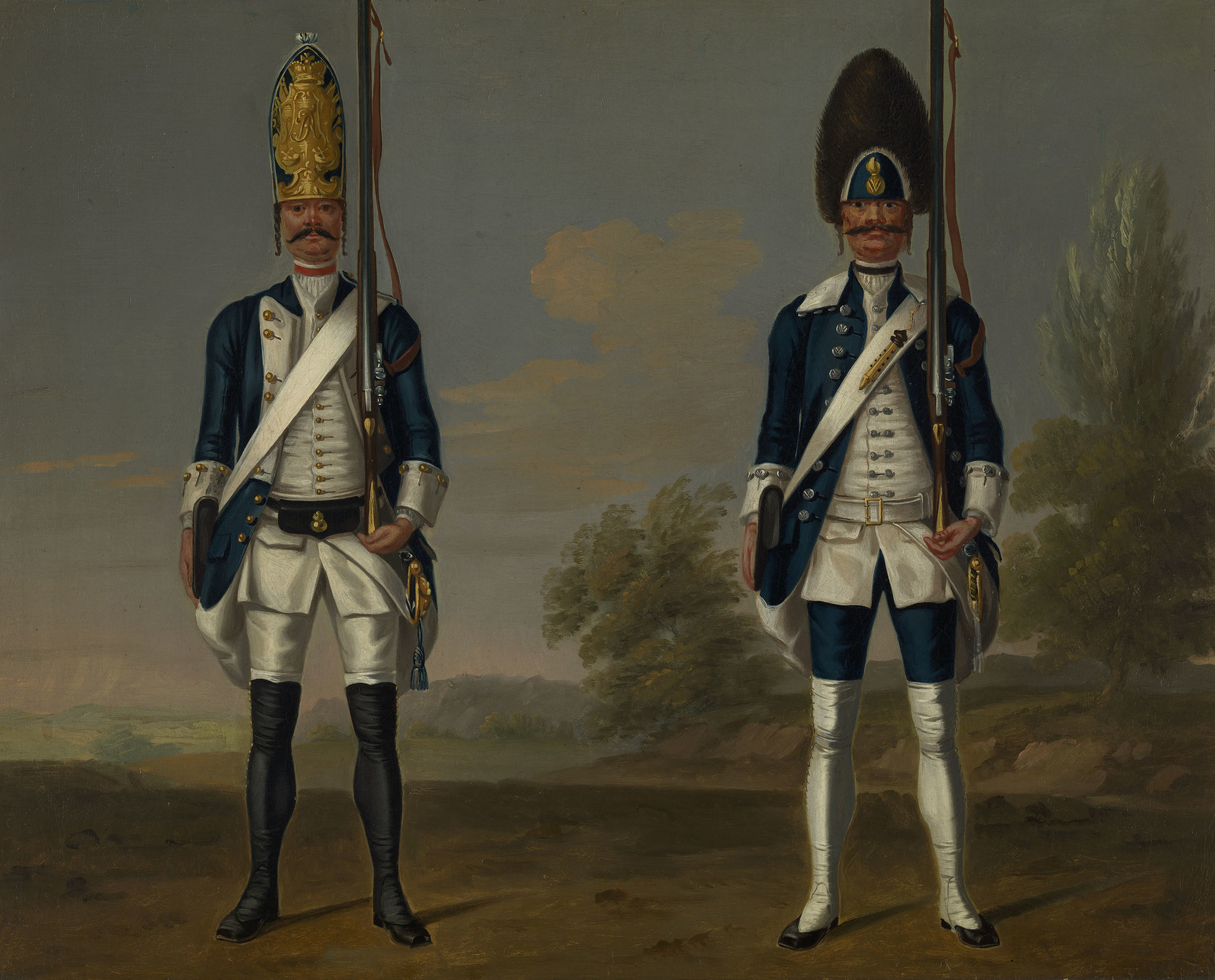
Grenadiers, German Infantry Battalion Schwartzburg-Rudolstadt and Walloon Grenadiers (Dutch)

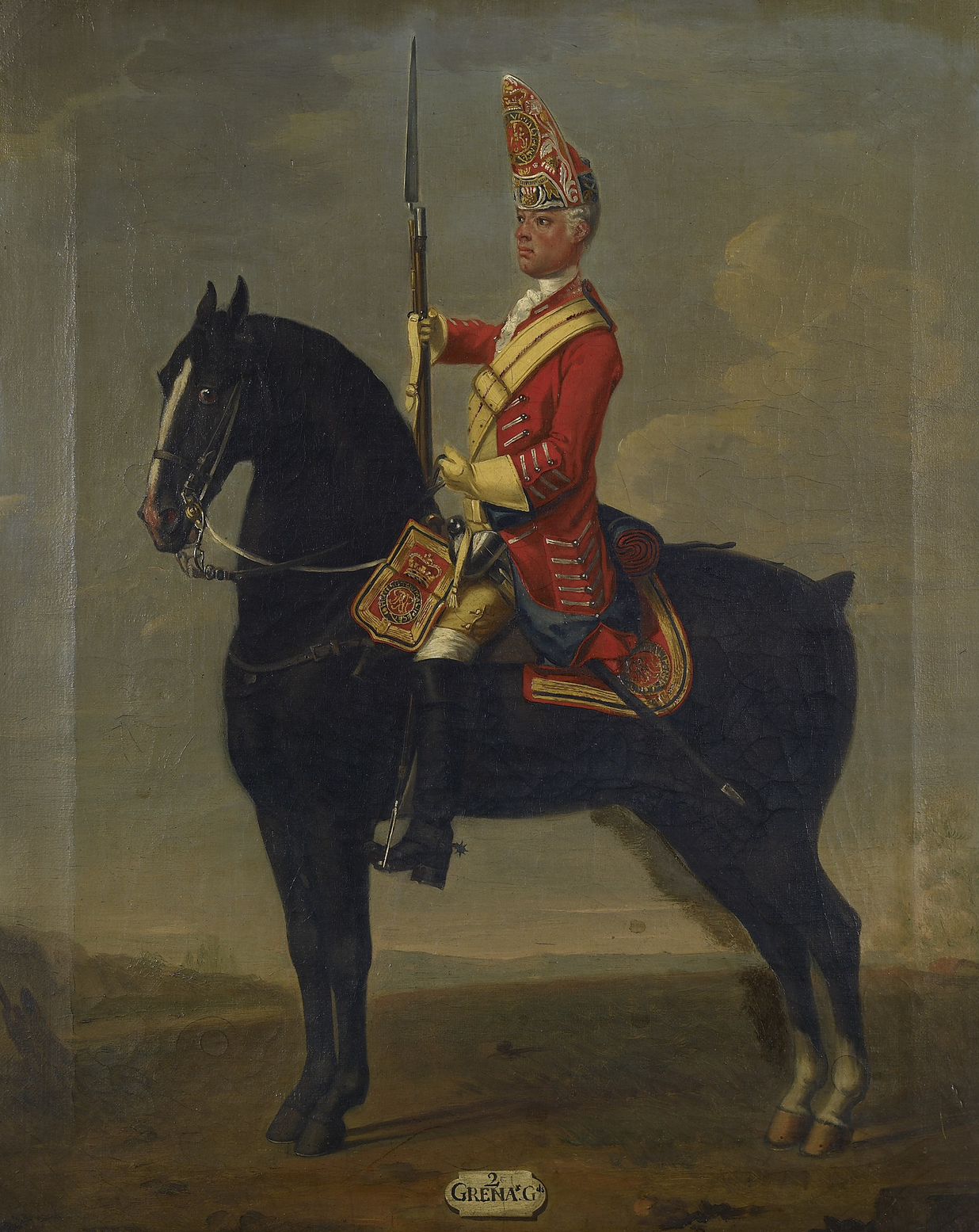
Trooper of the 2nd Horse Grenadier Guards

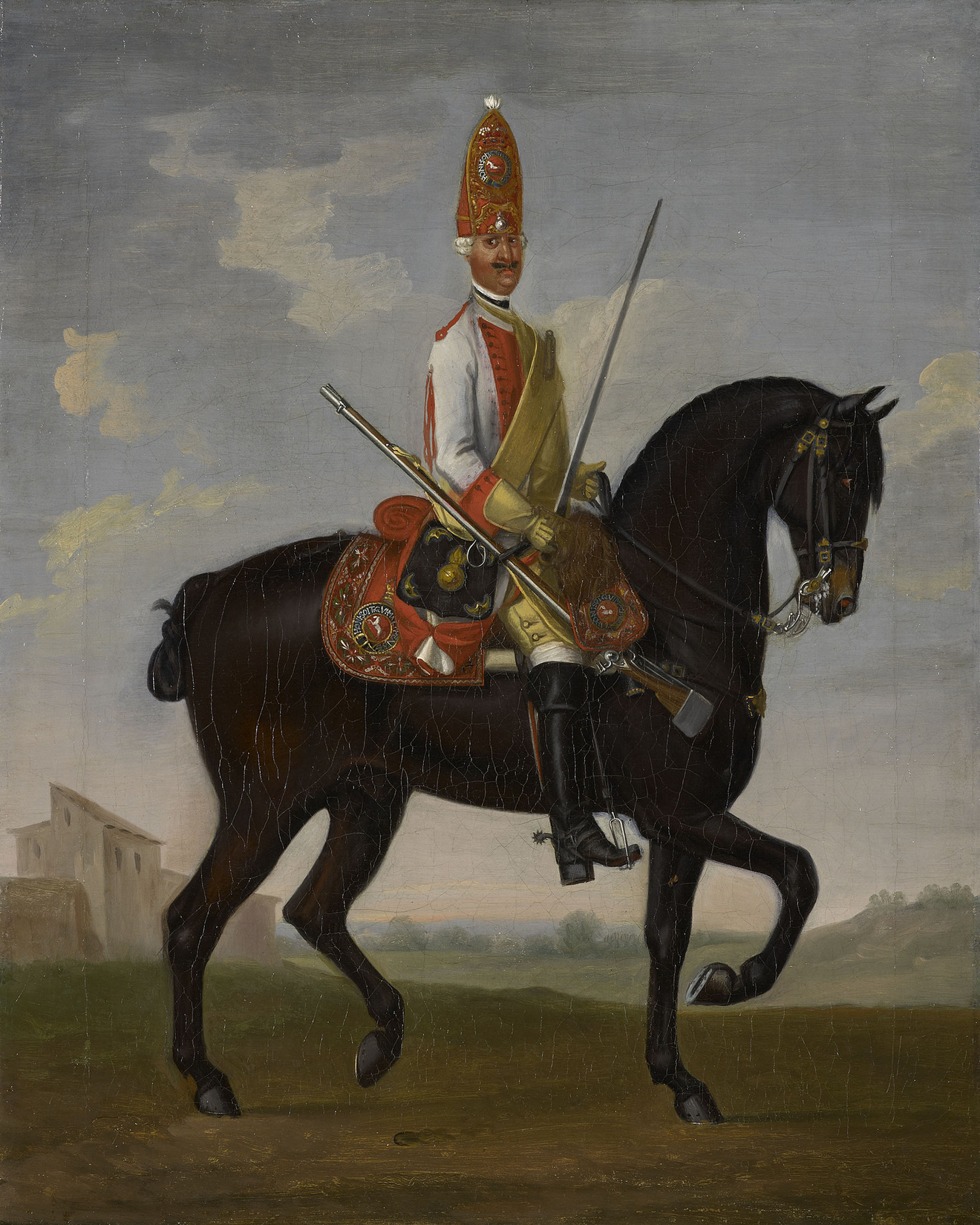
Grenadier, 8th Regiment of Dragoons Pontpietin

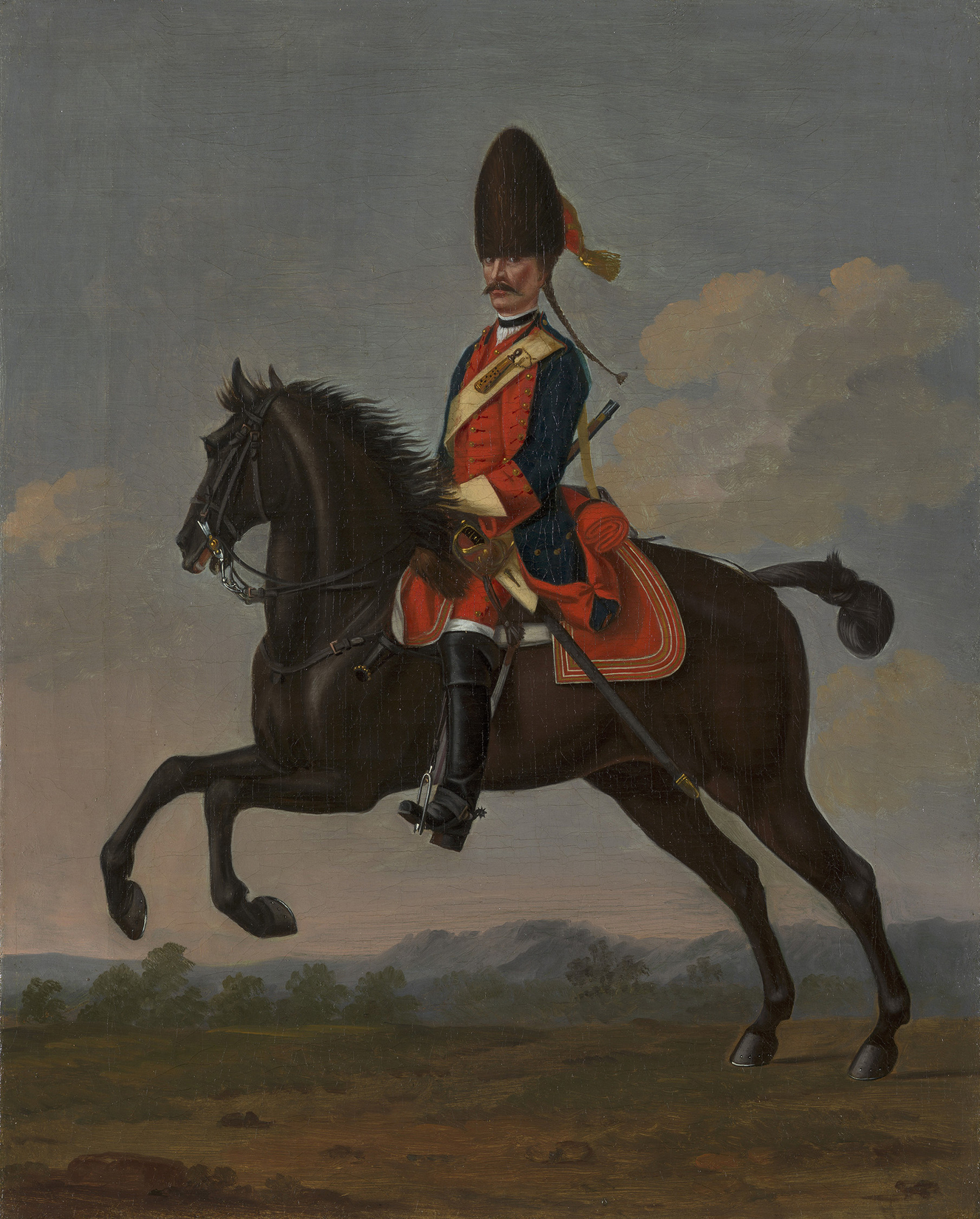
Grenadier, Regiment of Dragoons Liechtenstein

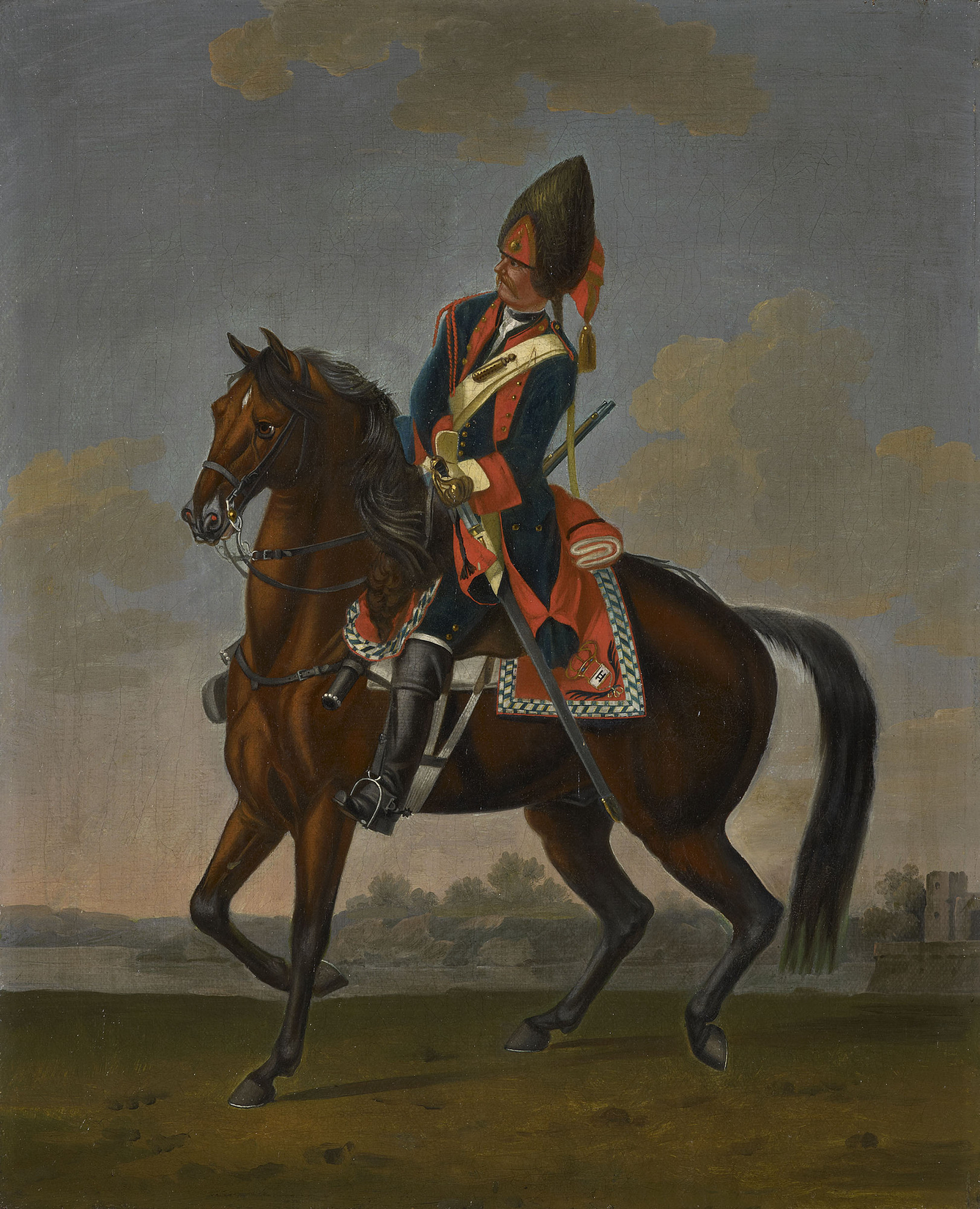
Grenadier, Regiment of Dragoons Althann

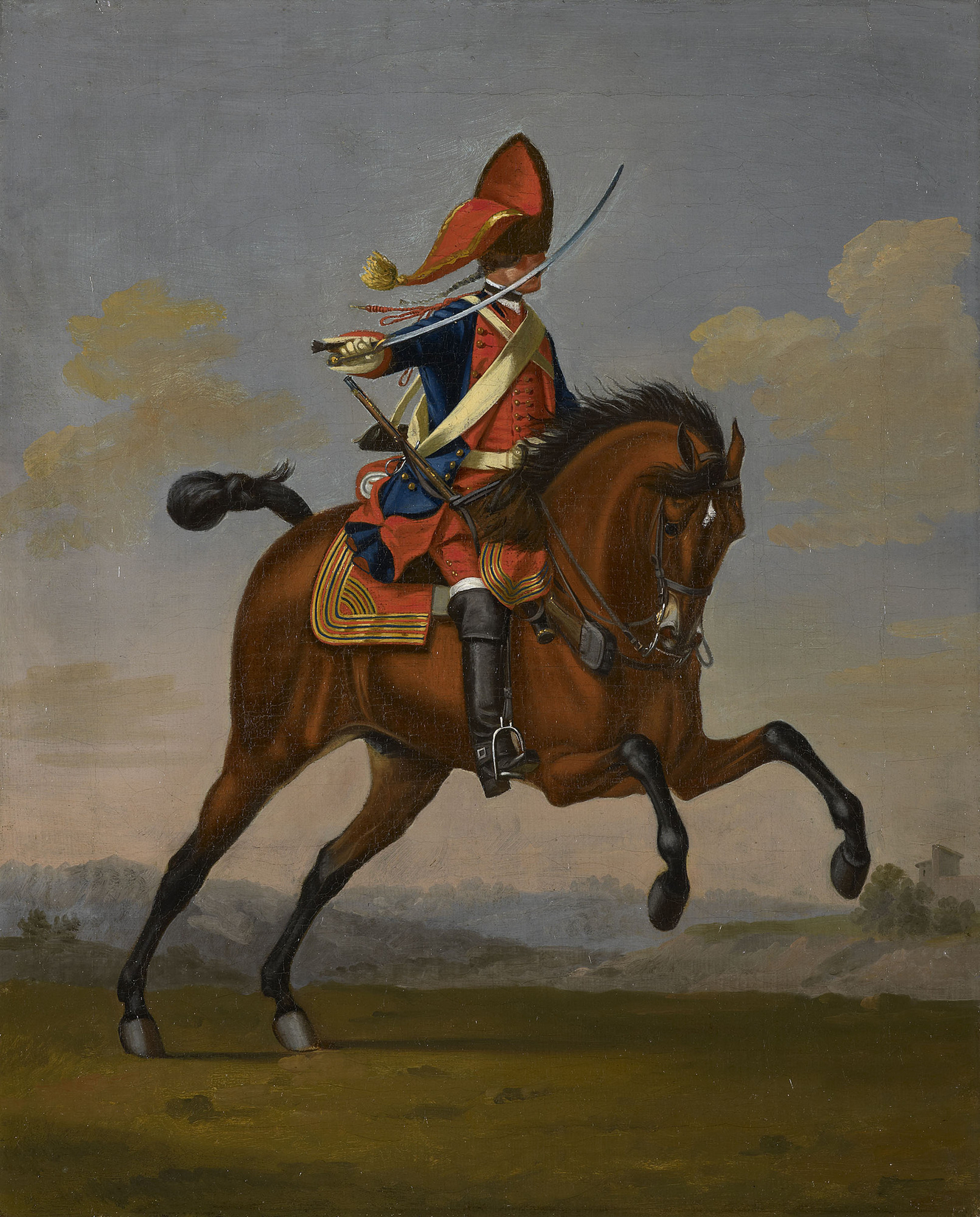
Grenadier, Regiment of Dragoons Batthyany

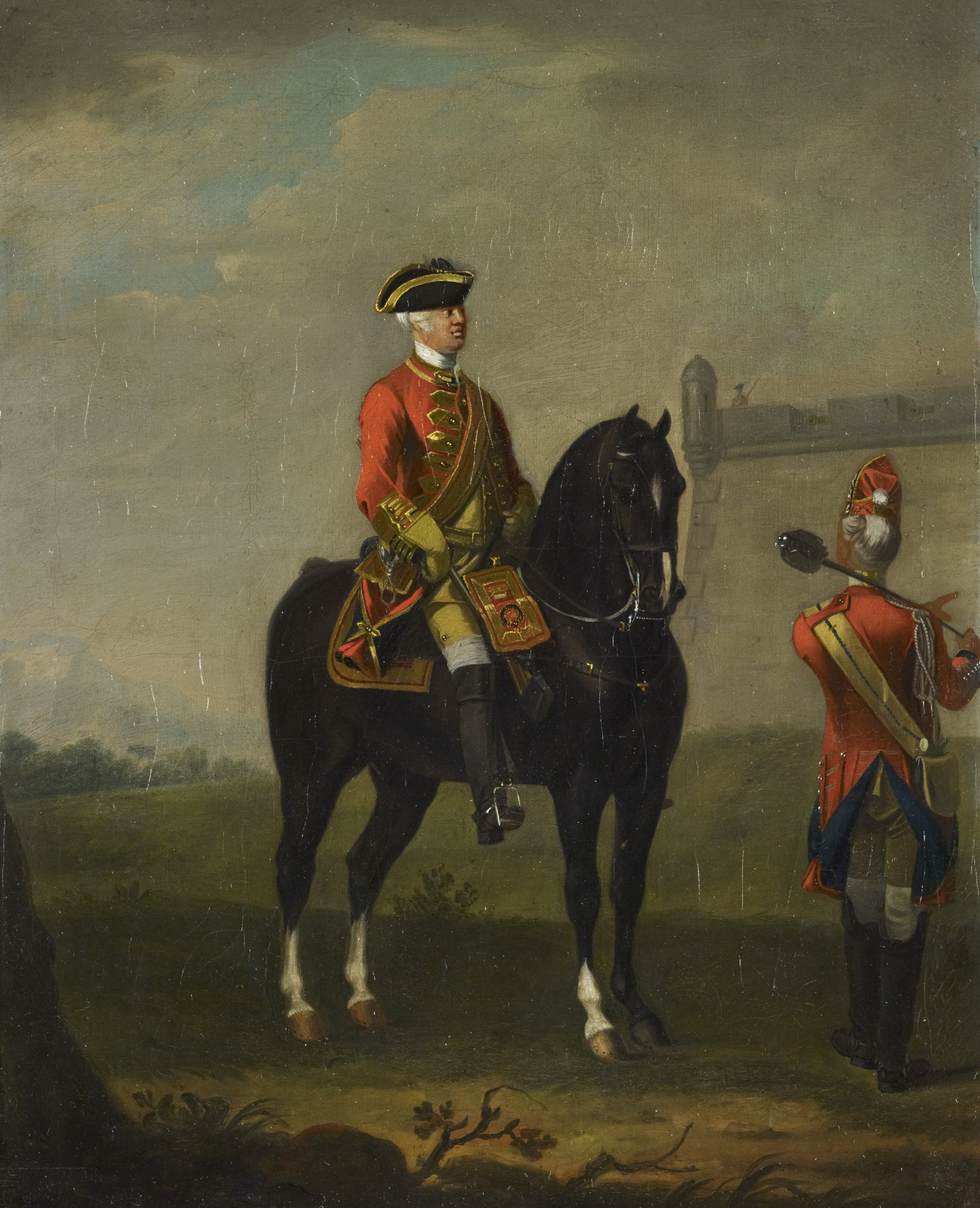
Privates, 1st Troop of Horse Guards and 1st Troop of Horse Grenadier Guards

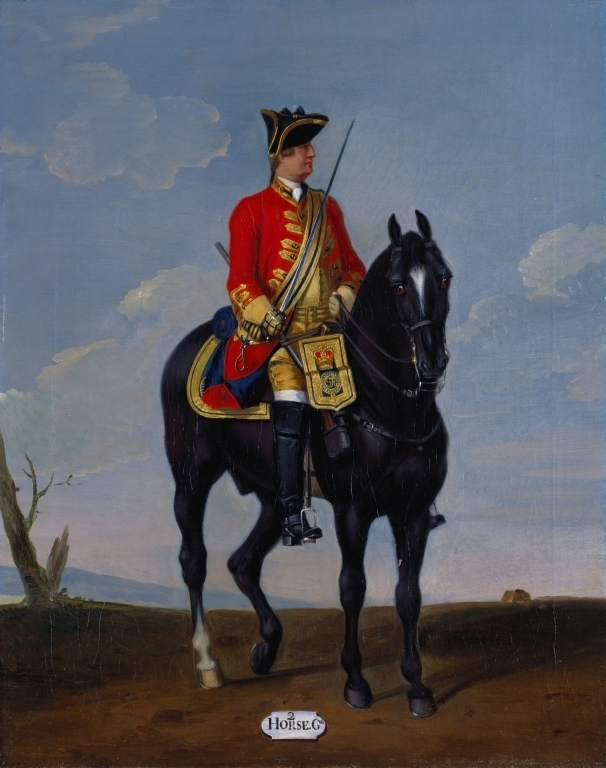
Private, 2nd Troop of Horse Guards

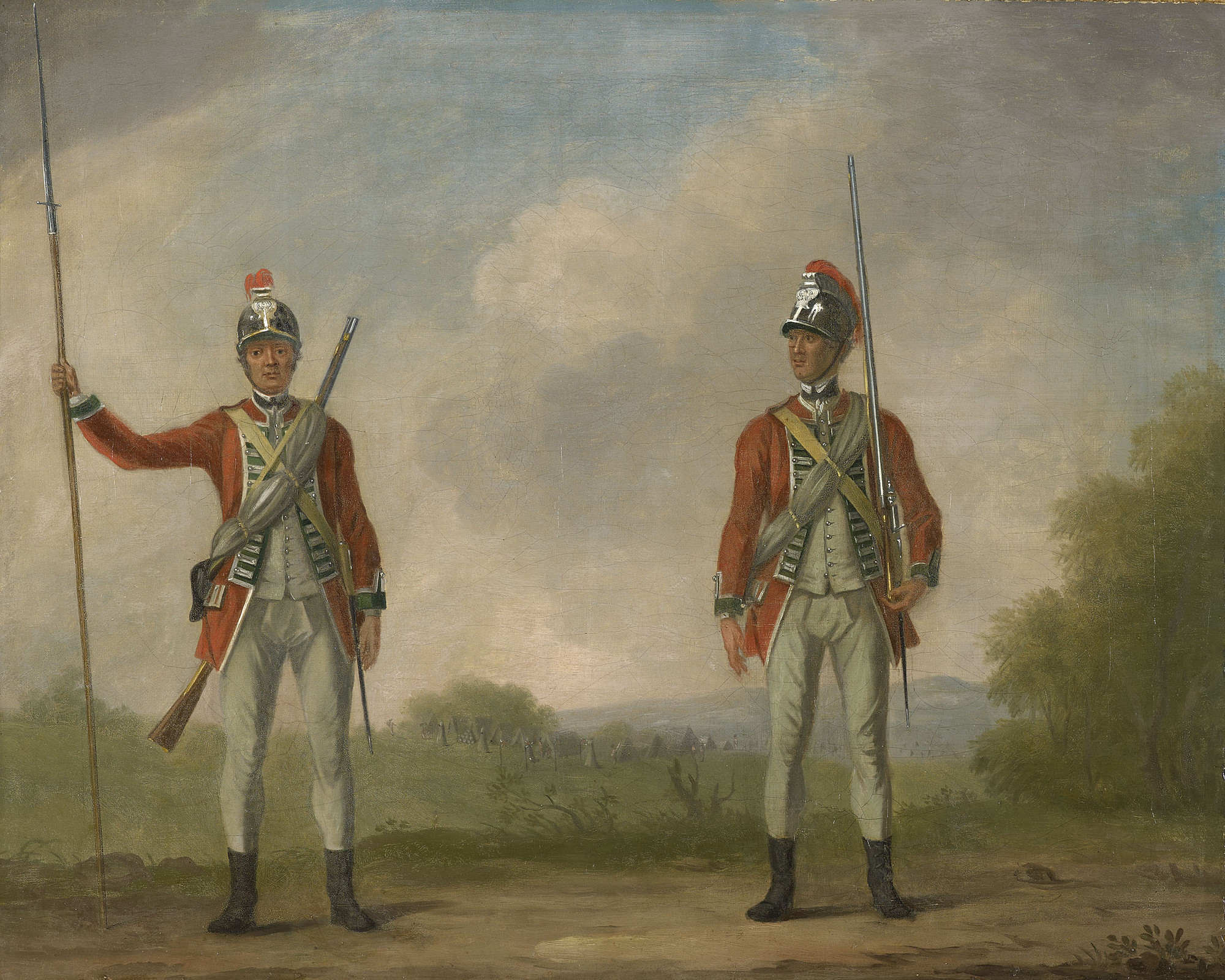
Privates, 119th (Prince's Own) Regiment of Foot

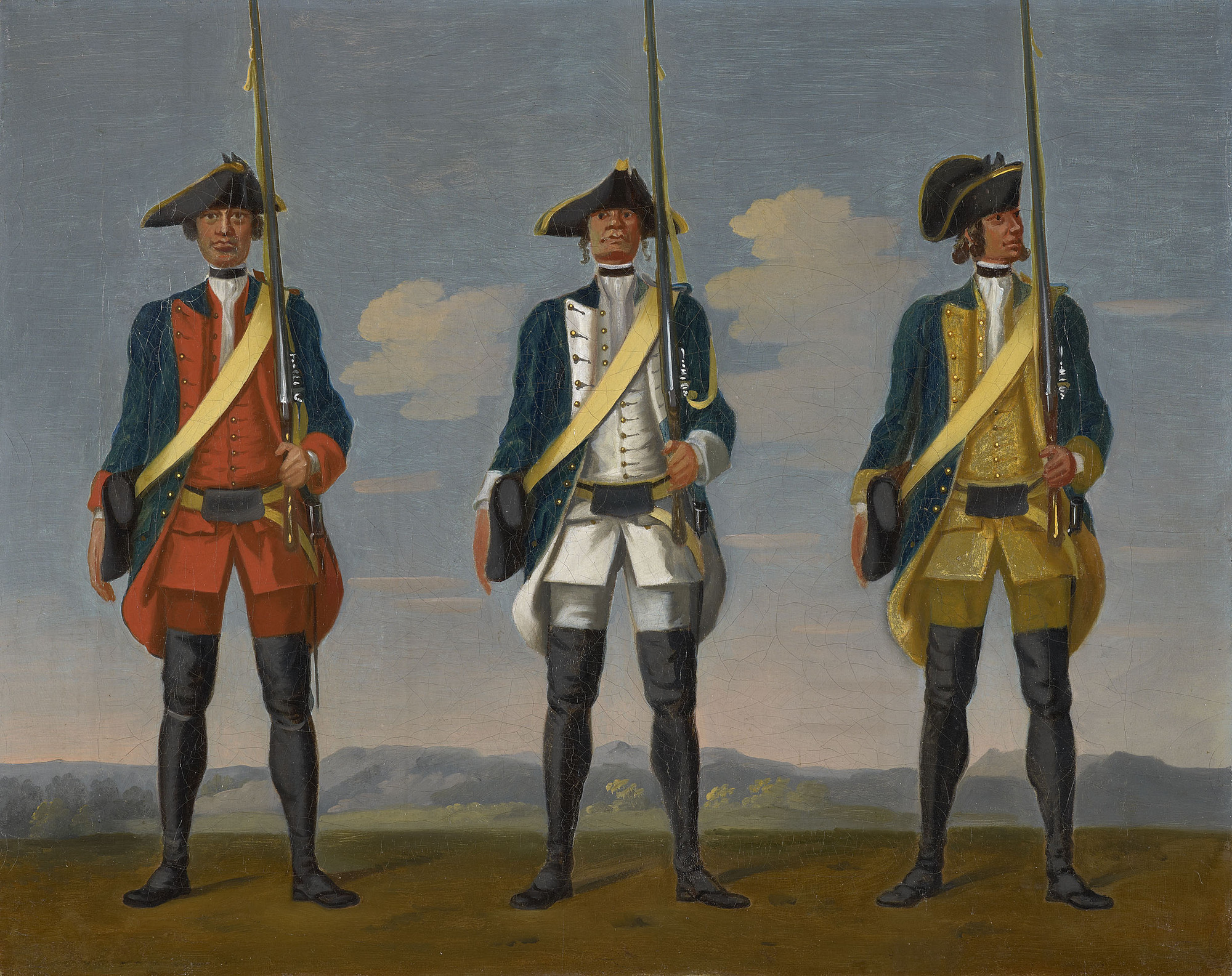
Privates, Austria, Vrei-Compagnien

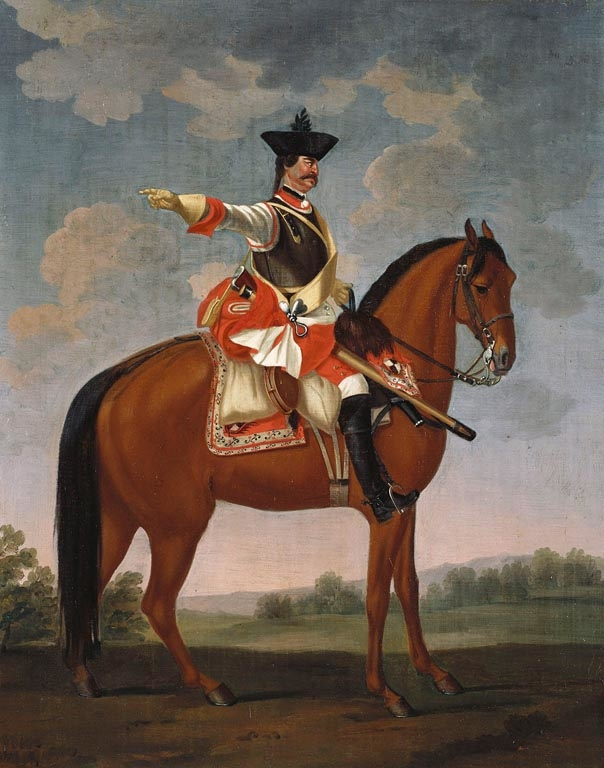
Private, 1st Regiment of Cuirassiers Hohenzollern-Hechingen

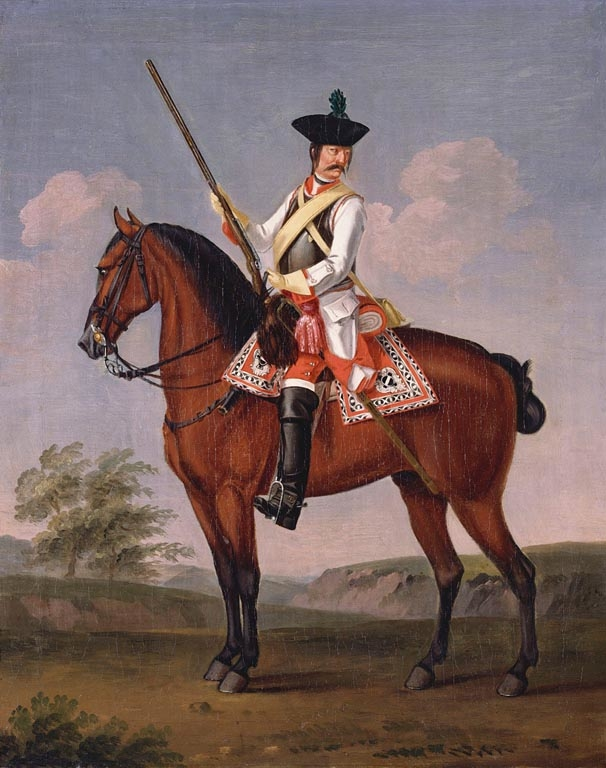
Private, 15th Regiment of Cuirassiers Diemar

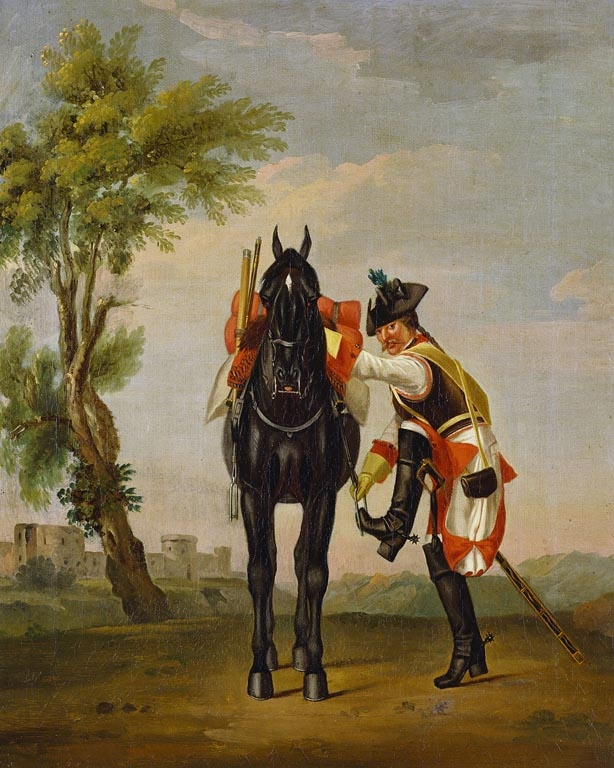
Private, 10th Regiment of Cuirassiers Pfalz-Birkenfeld

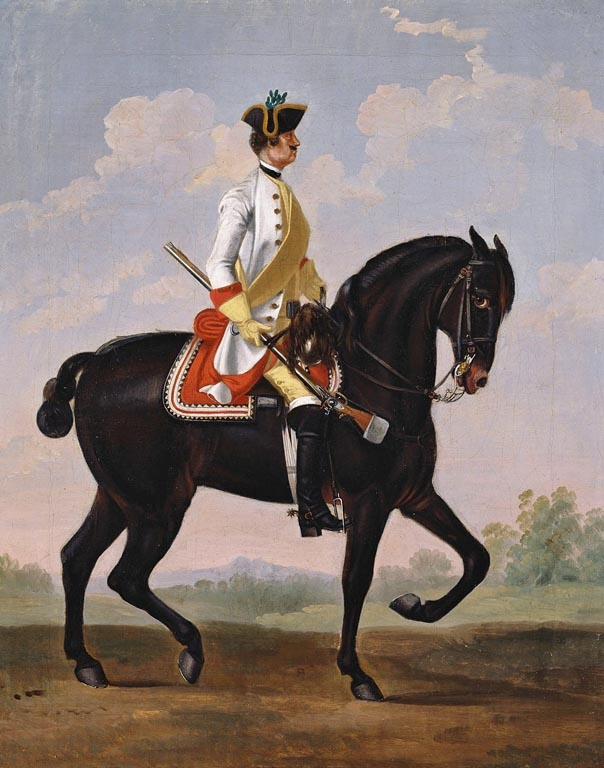
Private, Regiment of Horse 3A Wrede

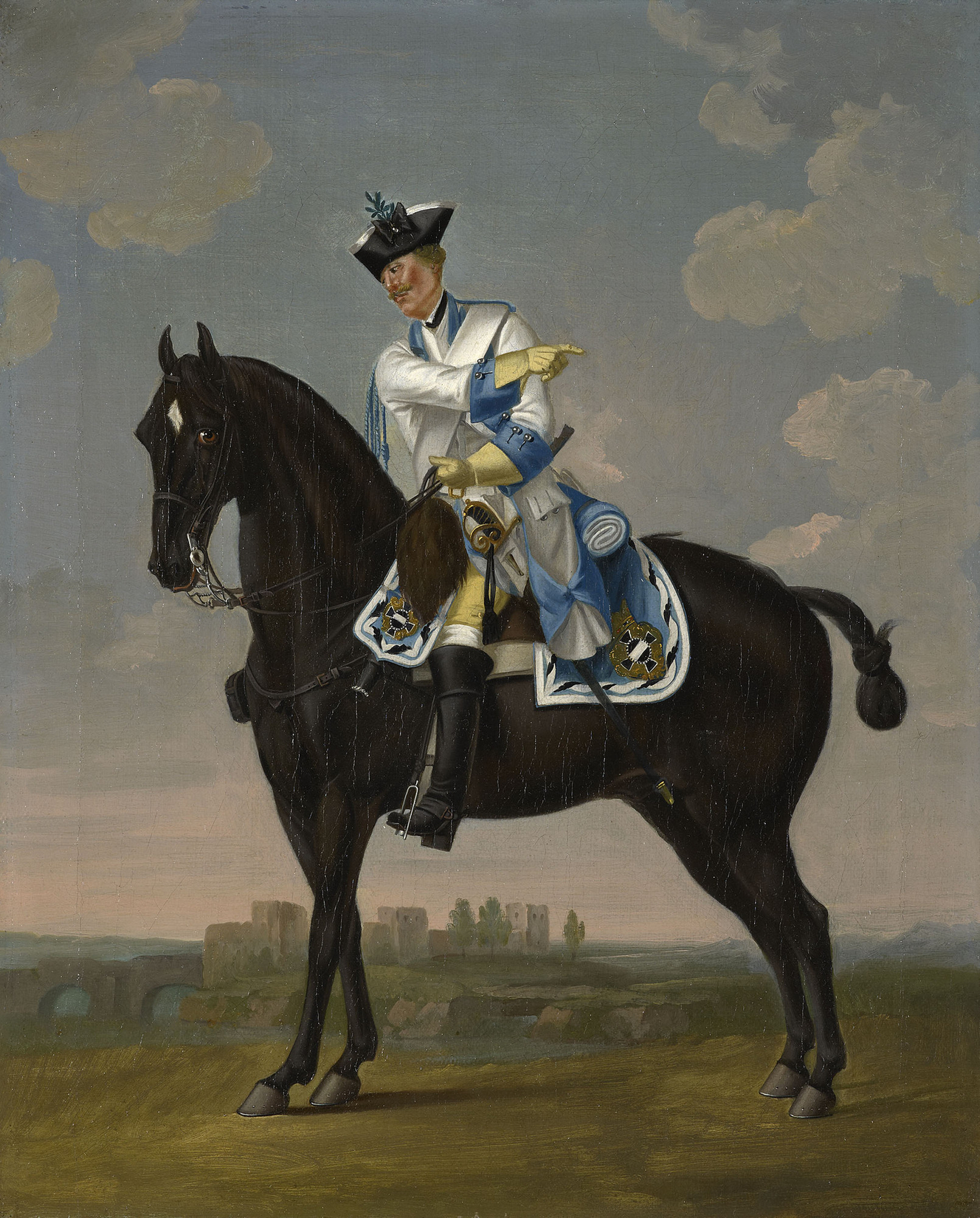
Private, Regiment of Horse Isenburg

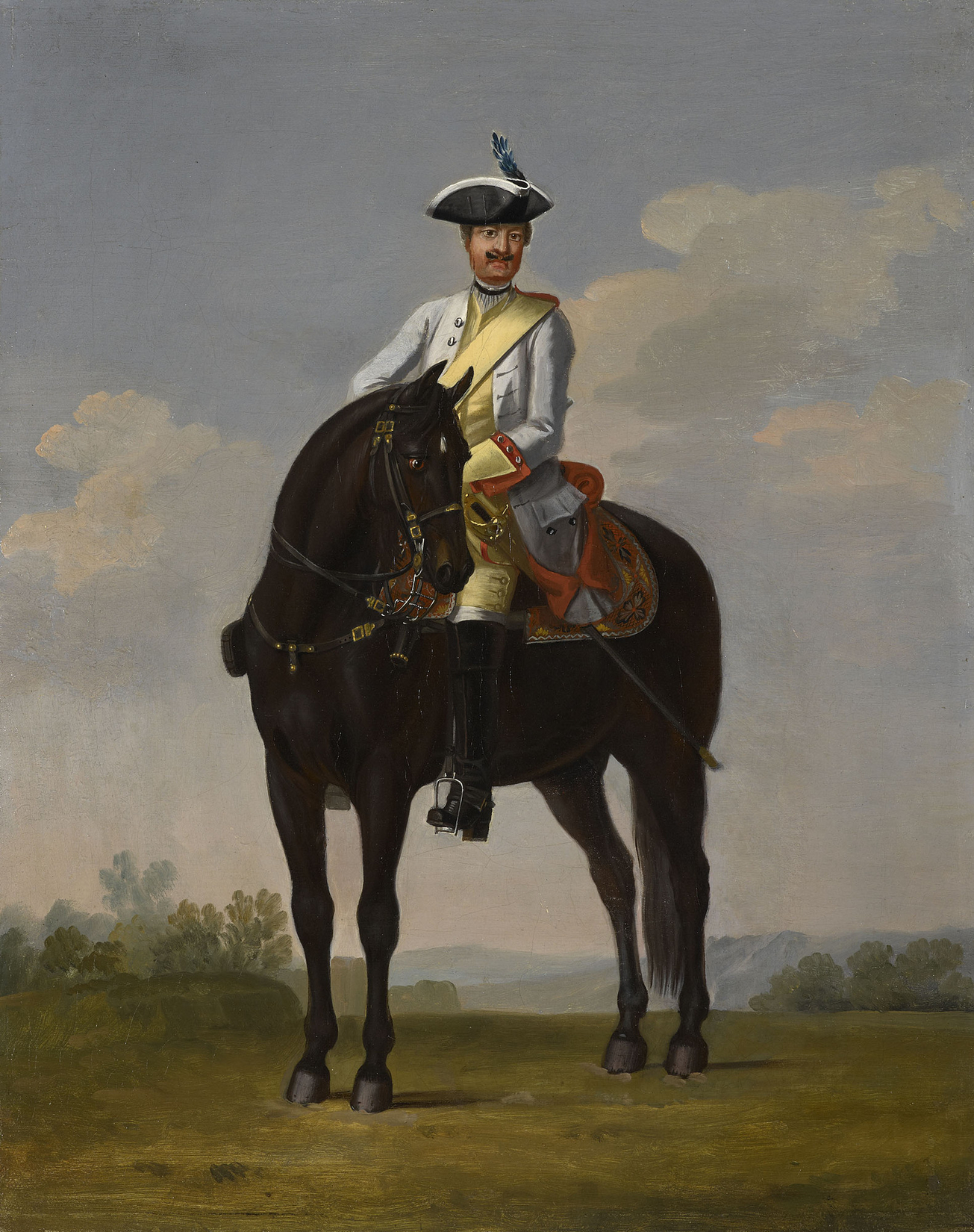
Private, Regiment of Horse 3B Briedenbach

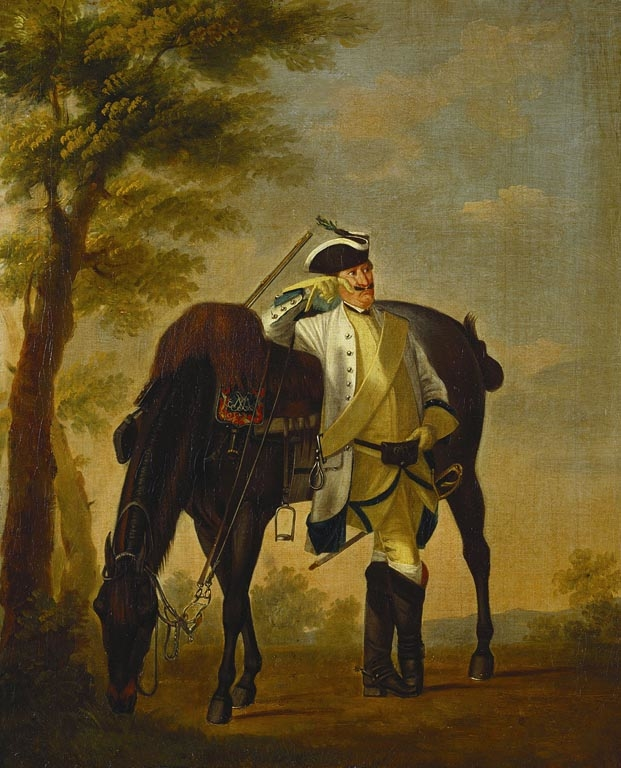
Private, Regiment of Horse 4B Pöllnitz

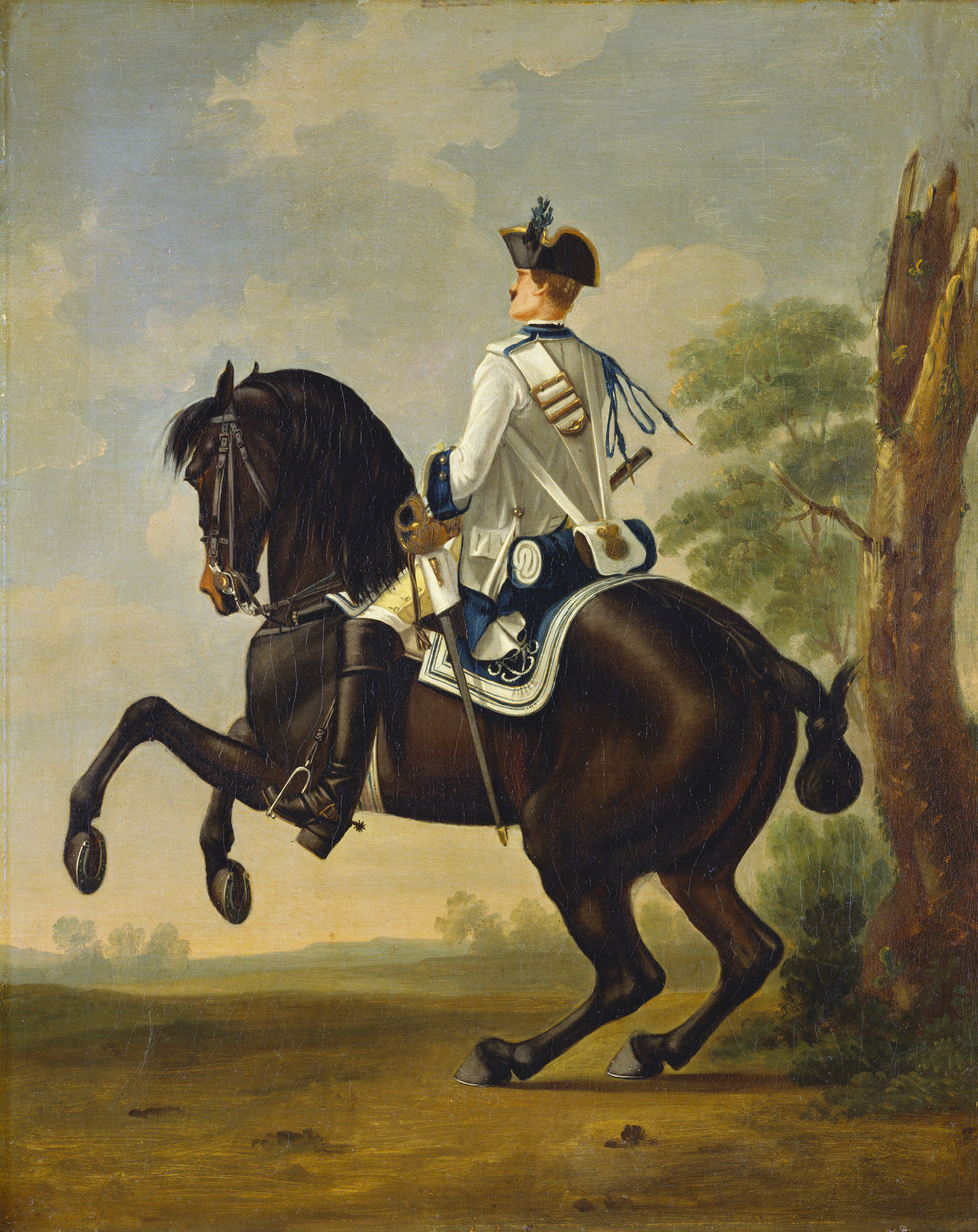
Private, Regiment of Horse Prinz Maximilian

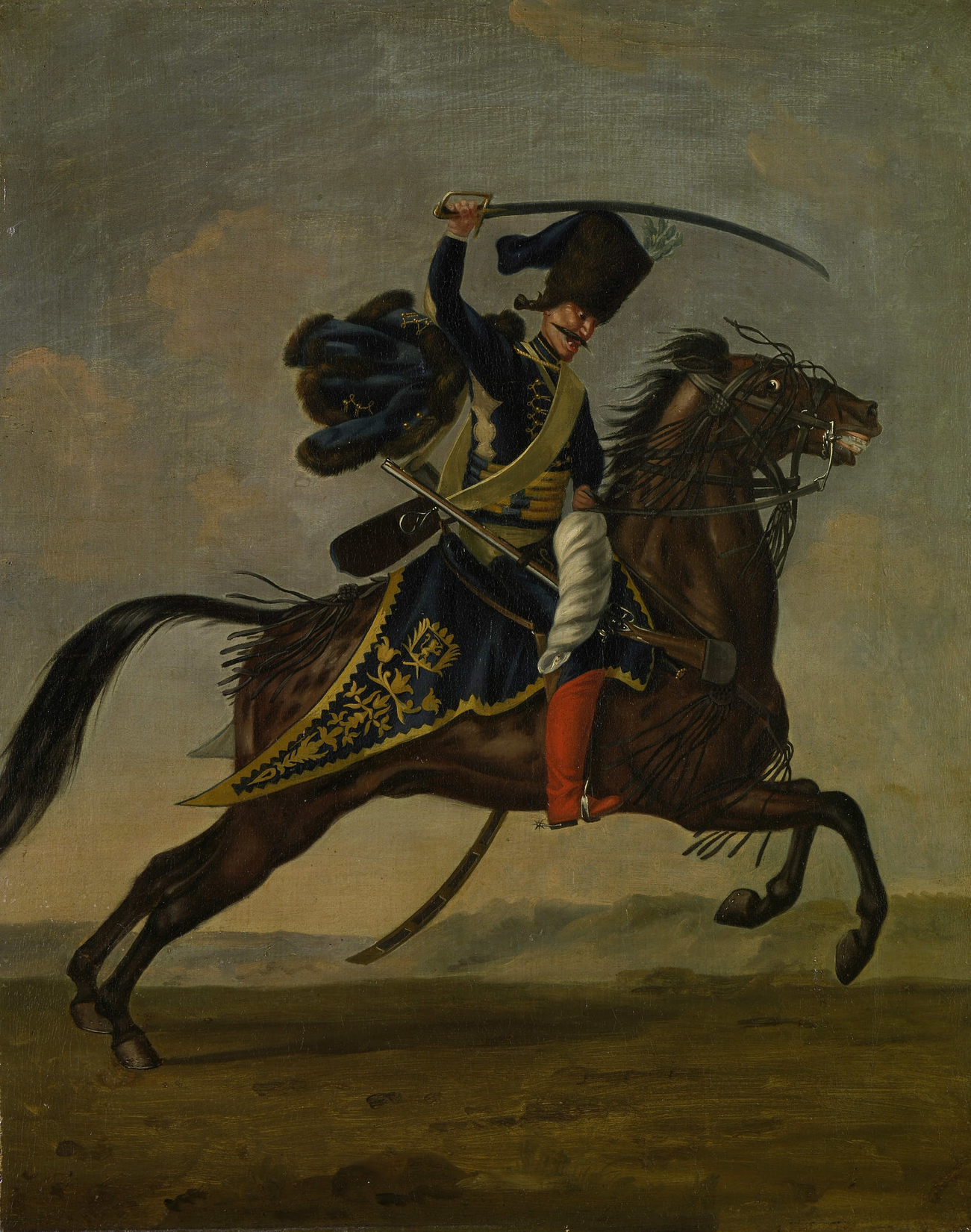
Private, Regiment of Hussars Kalnoky

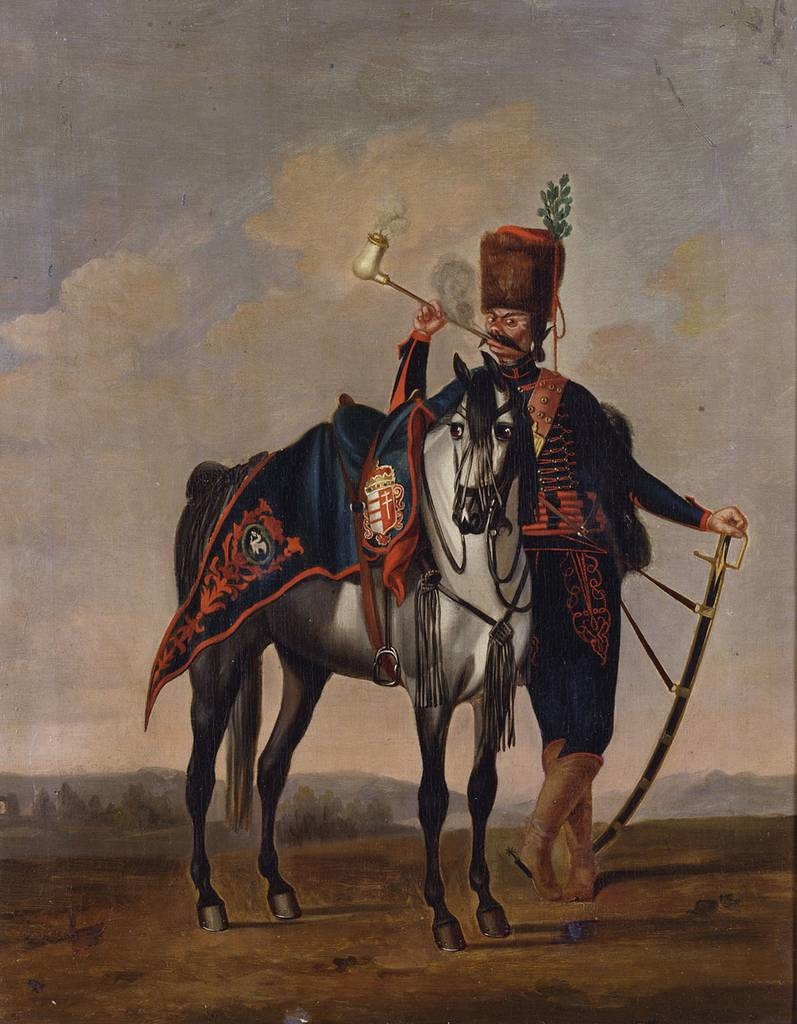
Private, Regiment of Hussars Karoly

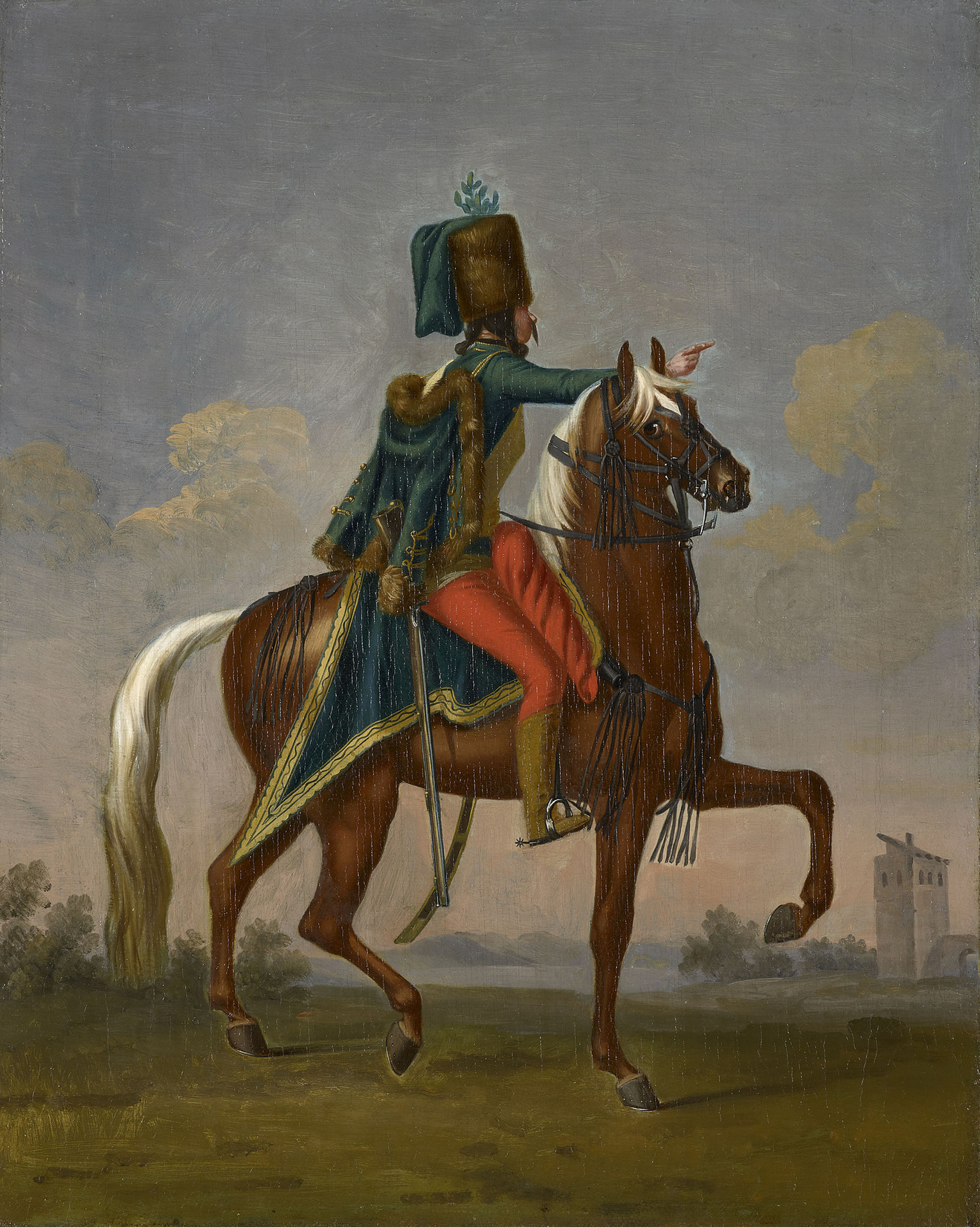
Private, Regiment of Hussars Nadasdy

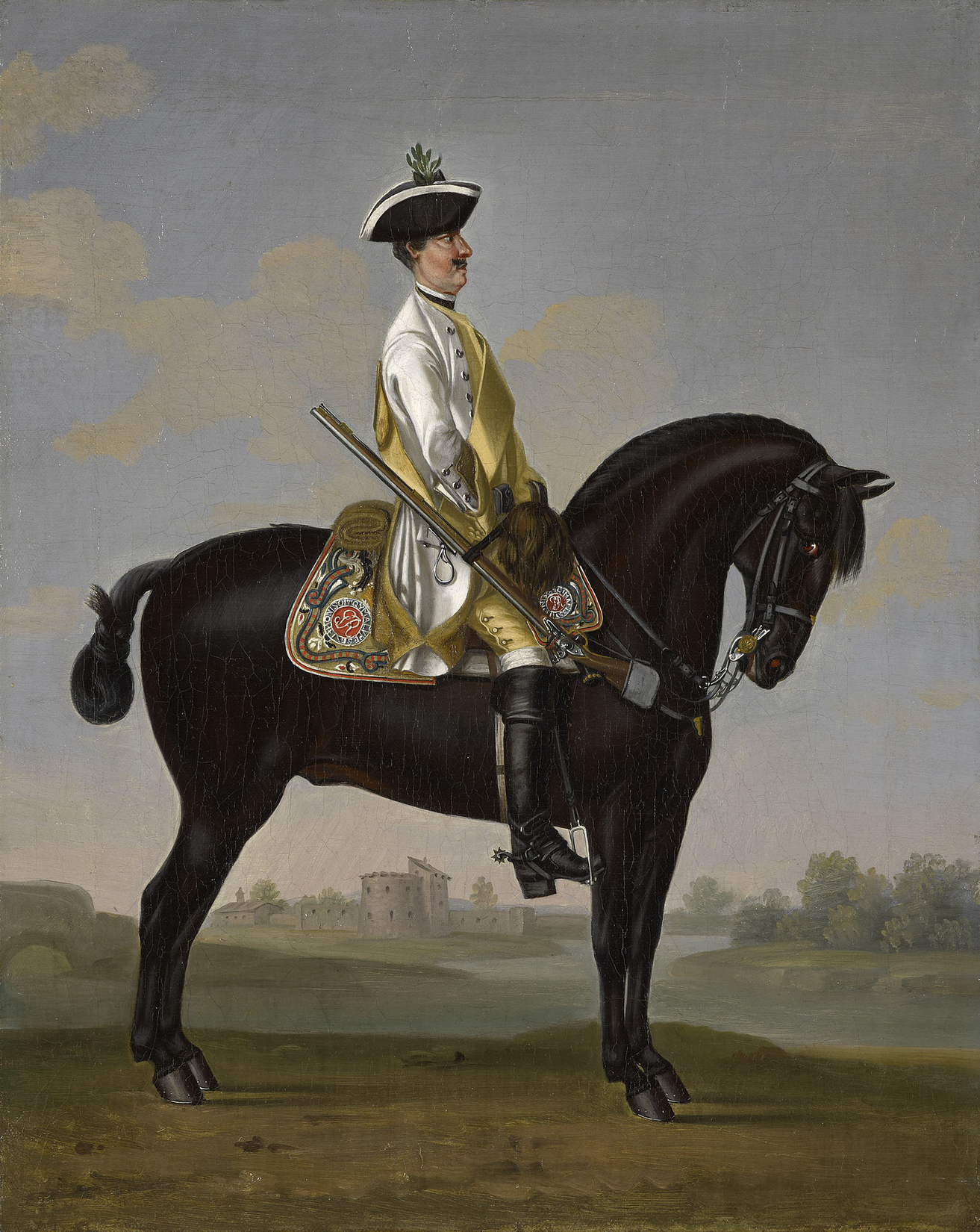
Private, Regiment of Horse 1A Leib Regiment

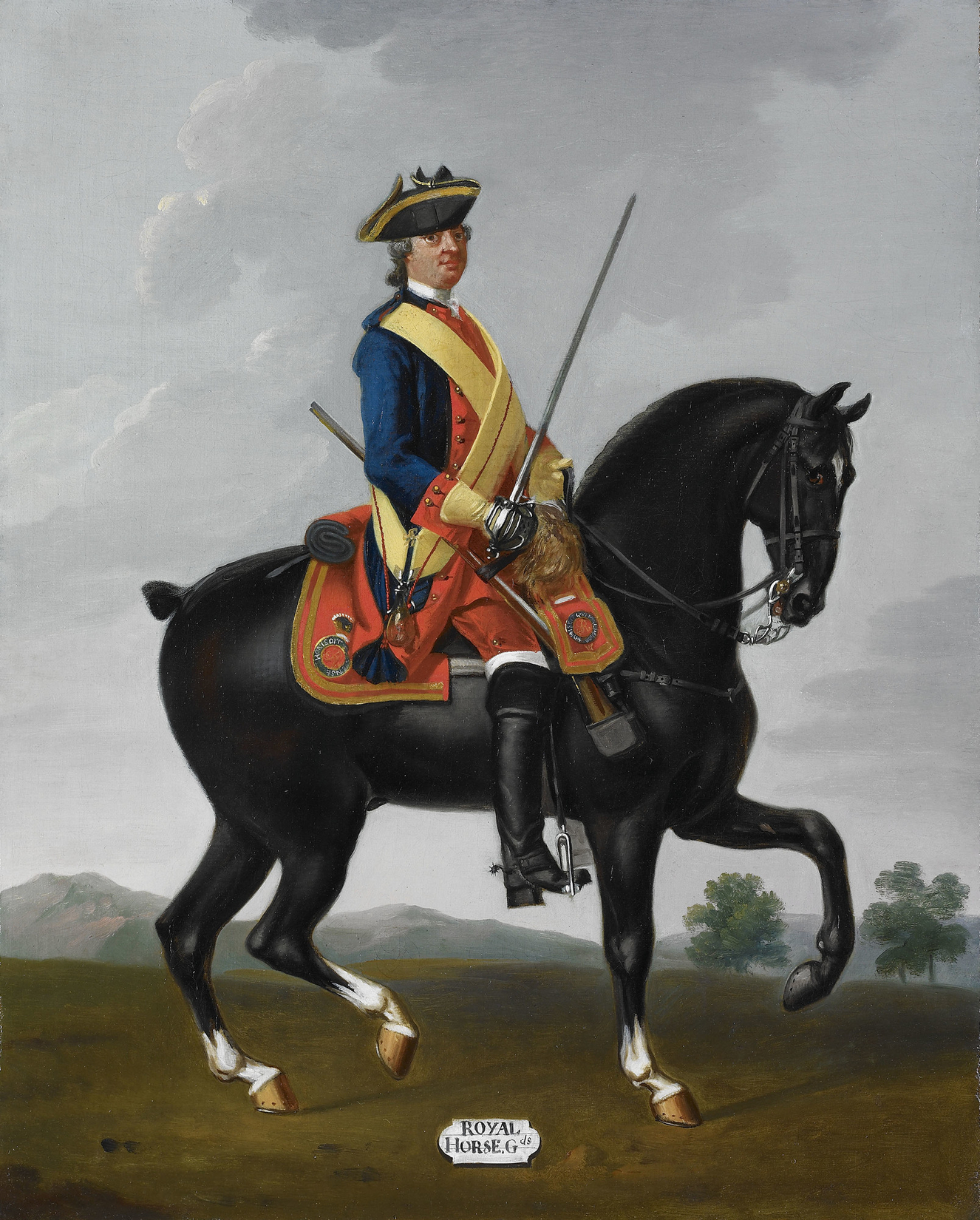
Private, Royal Horse Guards (The Blues)

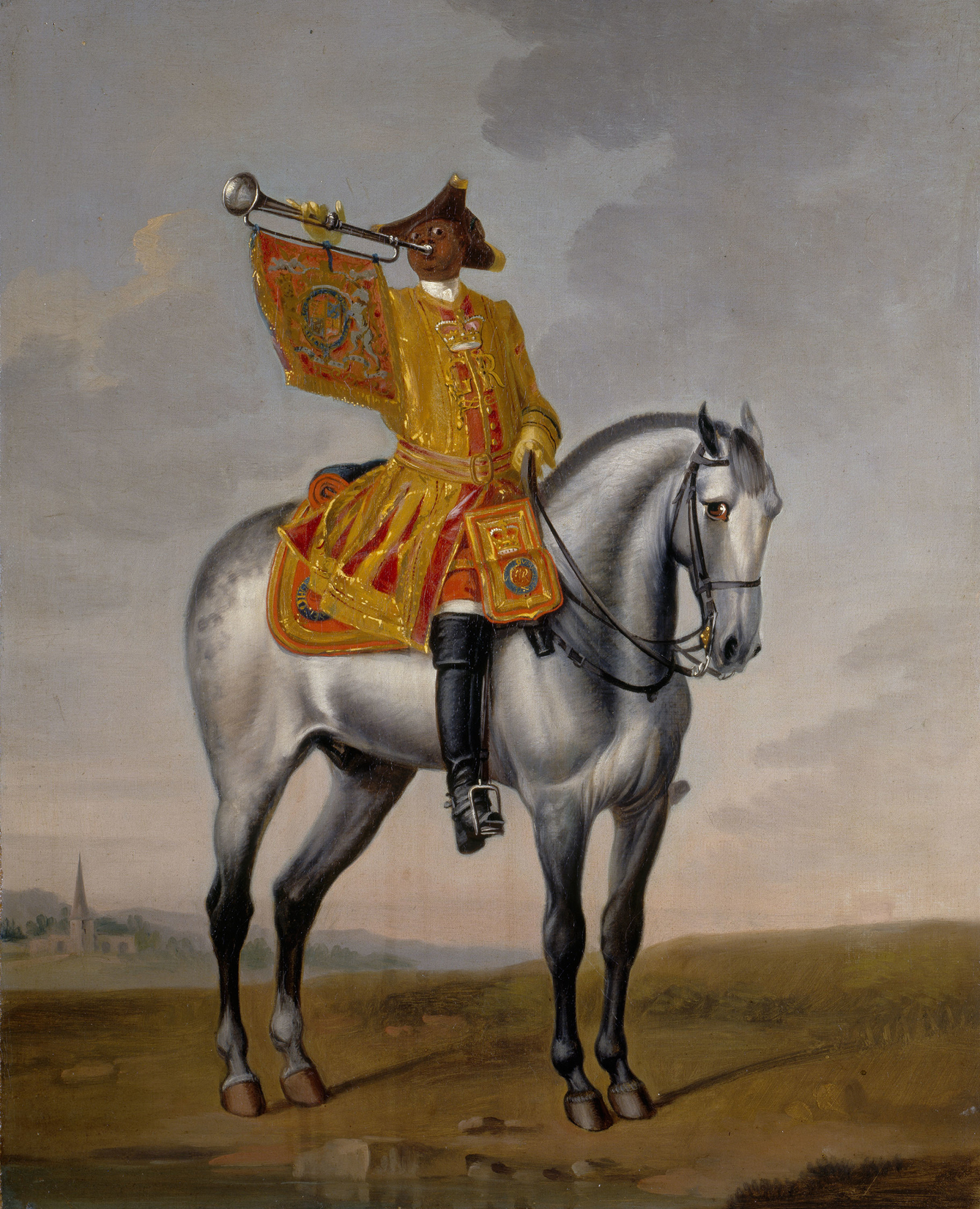
Trumpeter, 1st Troop of Horse Guards

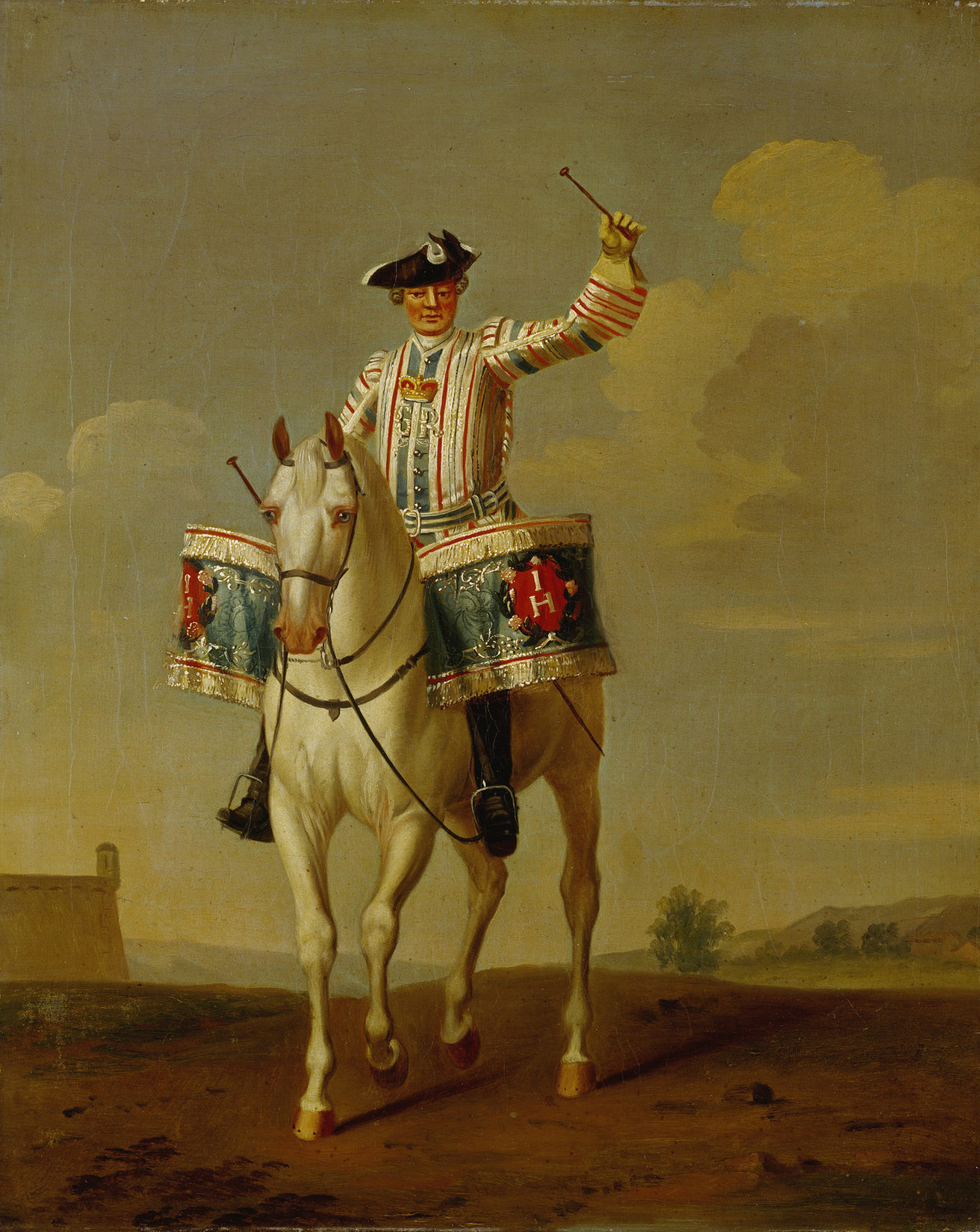
Kettle drummer, 1st Horse

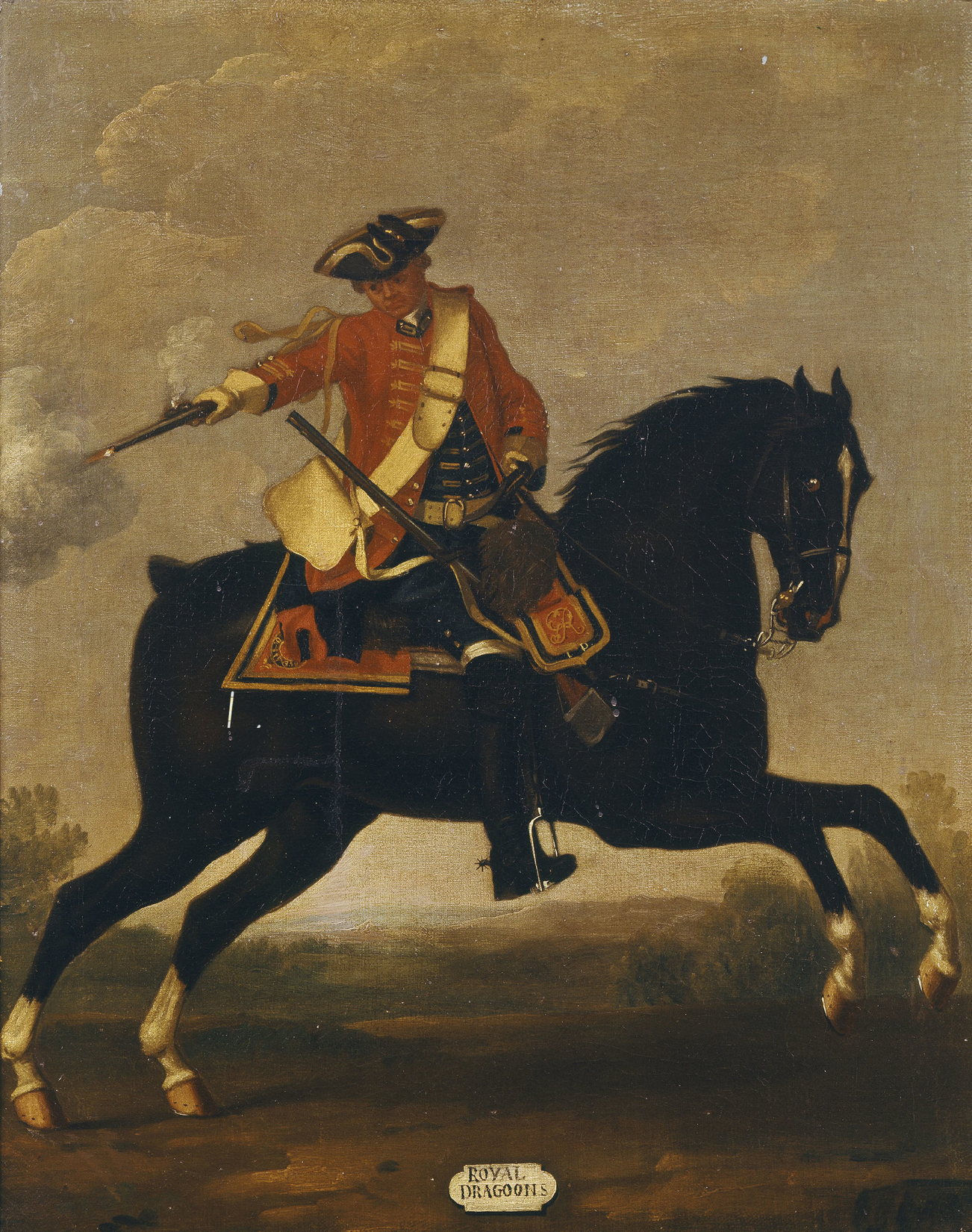
Private, 1st Royal Dragoons

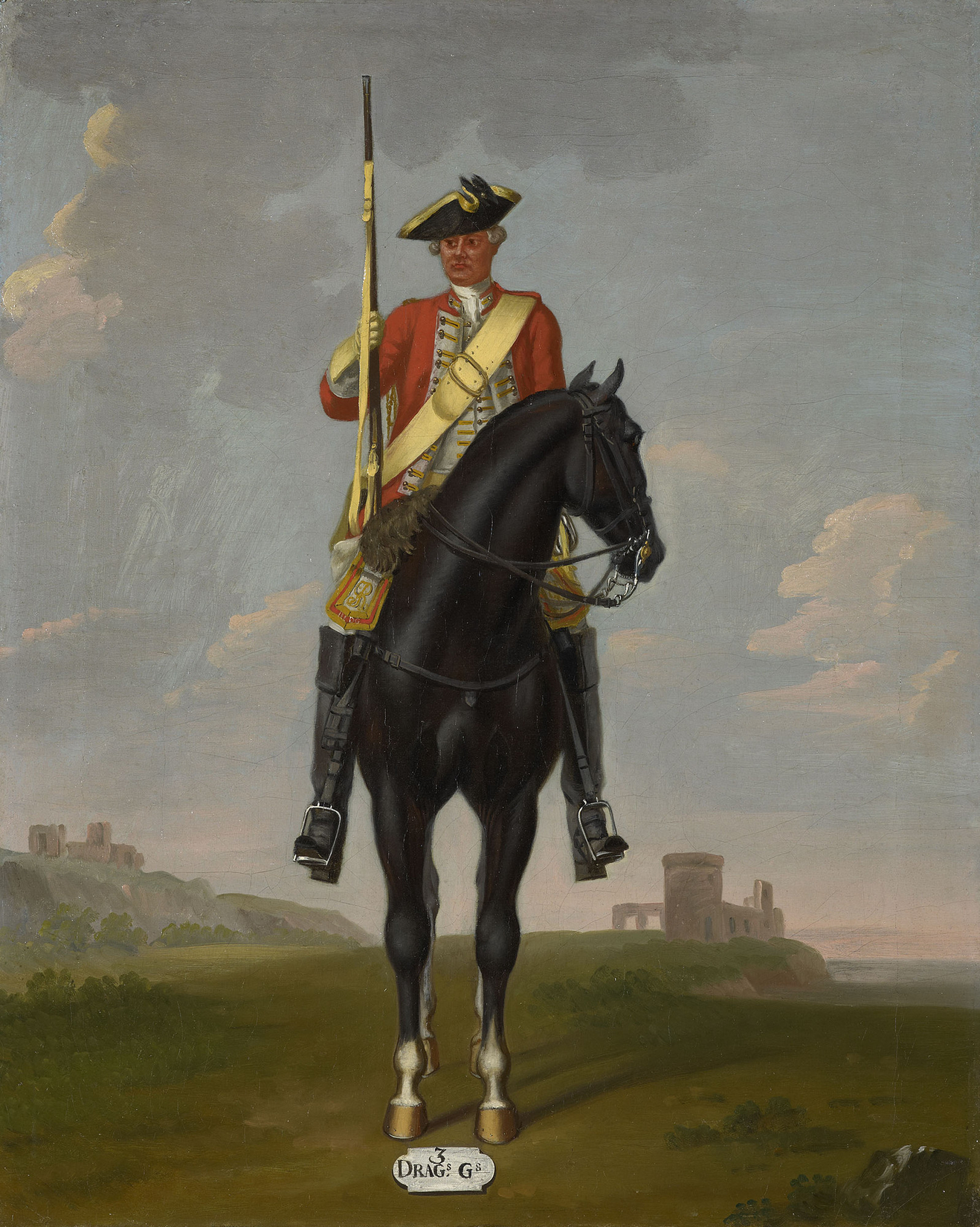
Private, 3rd Dragoon Guards

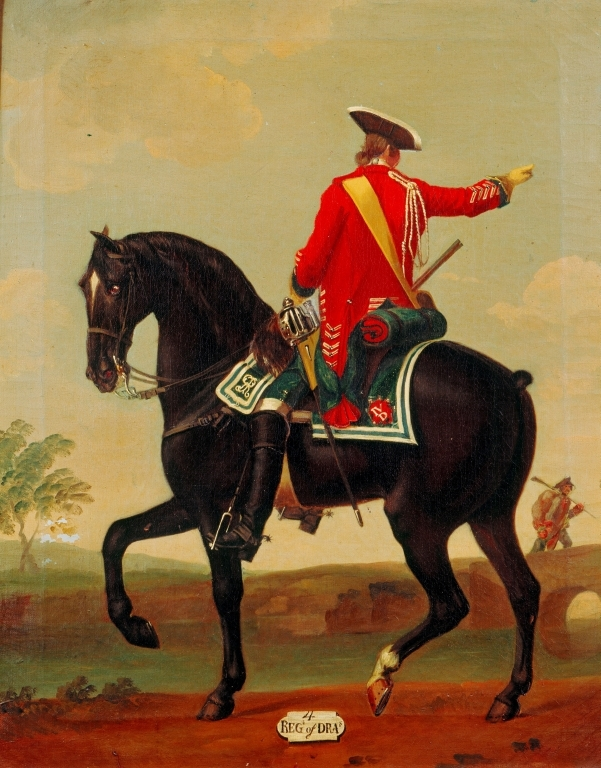
Private, 4th Dragoons

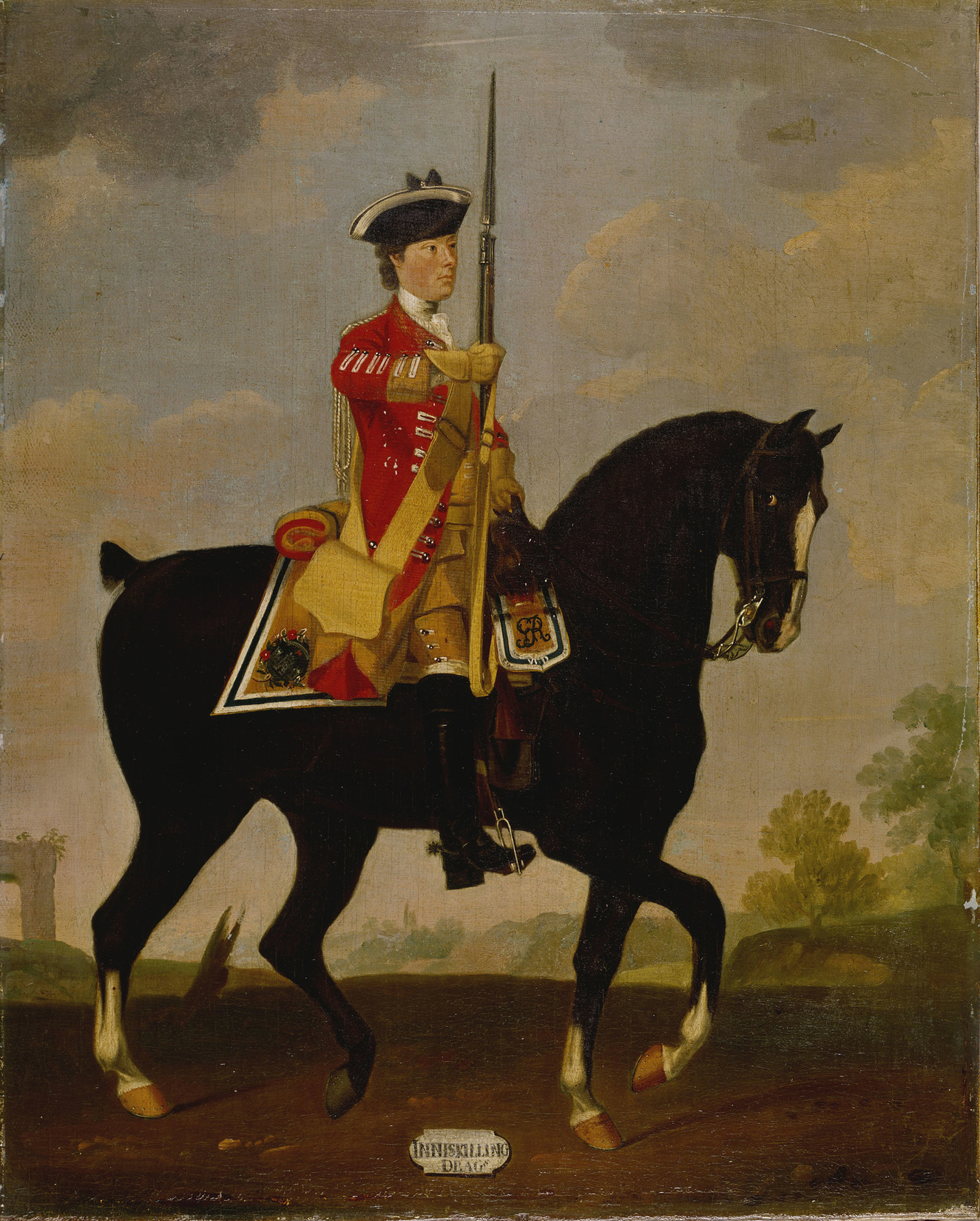
Private, 6th Inniskilling Dragoons

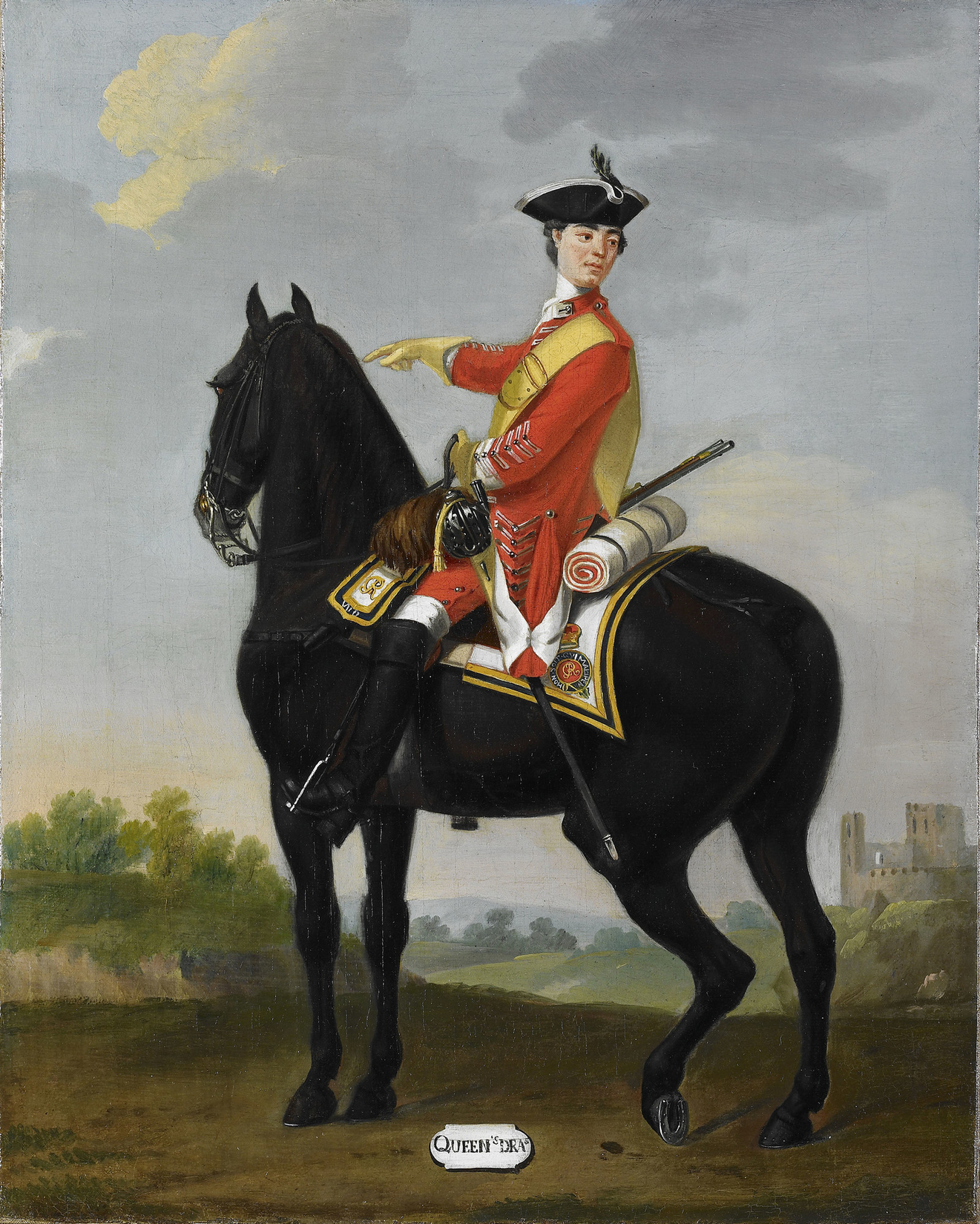
Private, 7th Queen's Dragoons

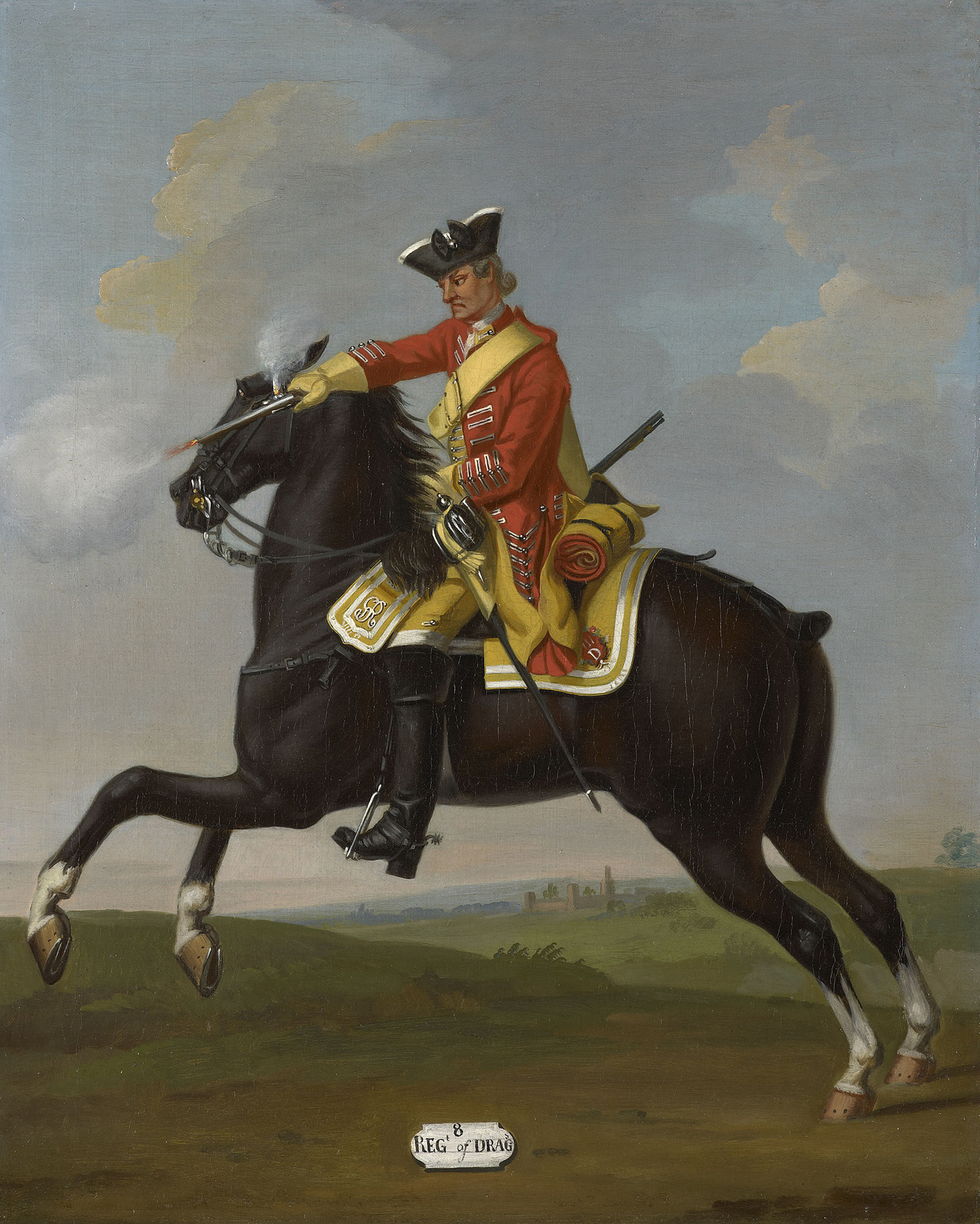
Private, 8th Dragoons

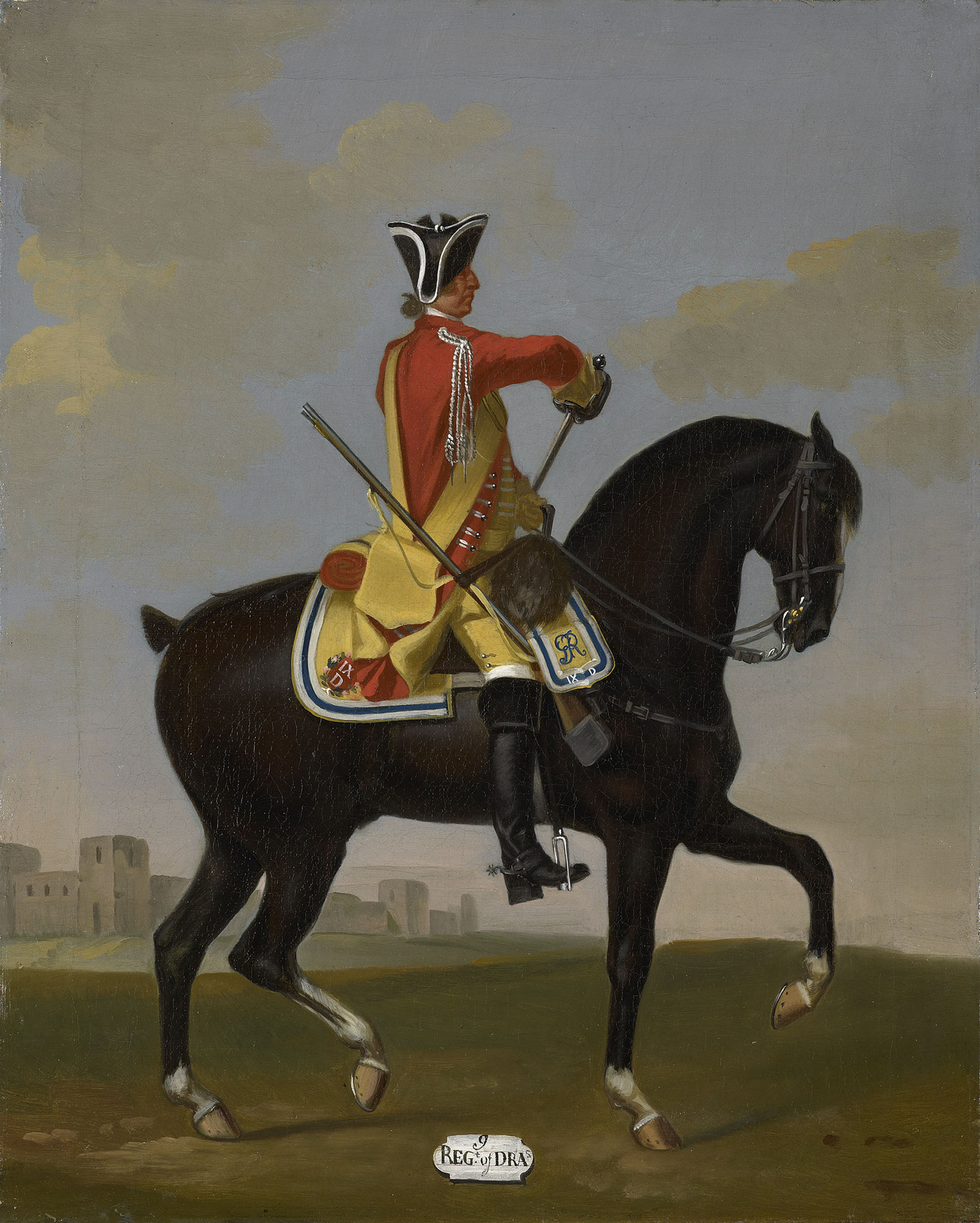
Private, 9th Dragoons

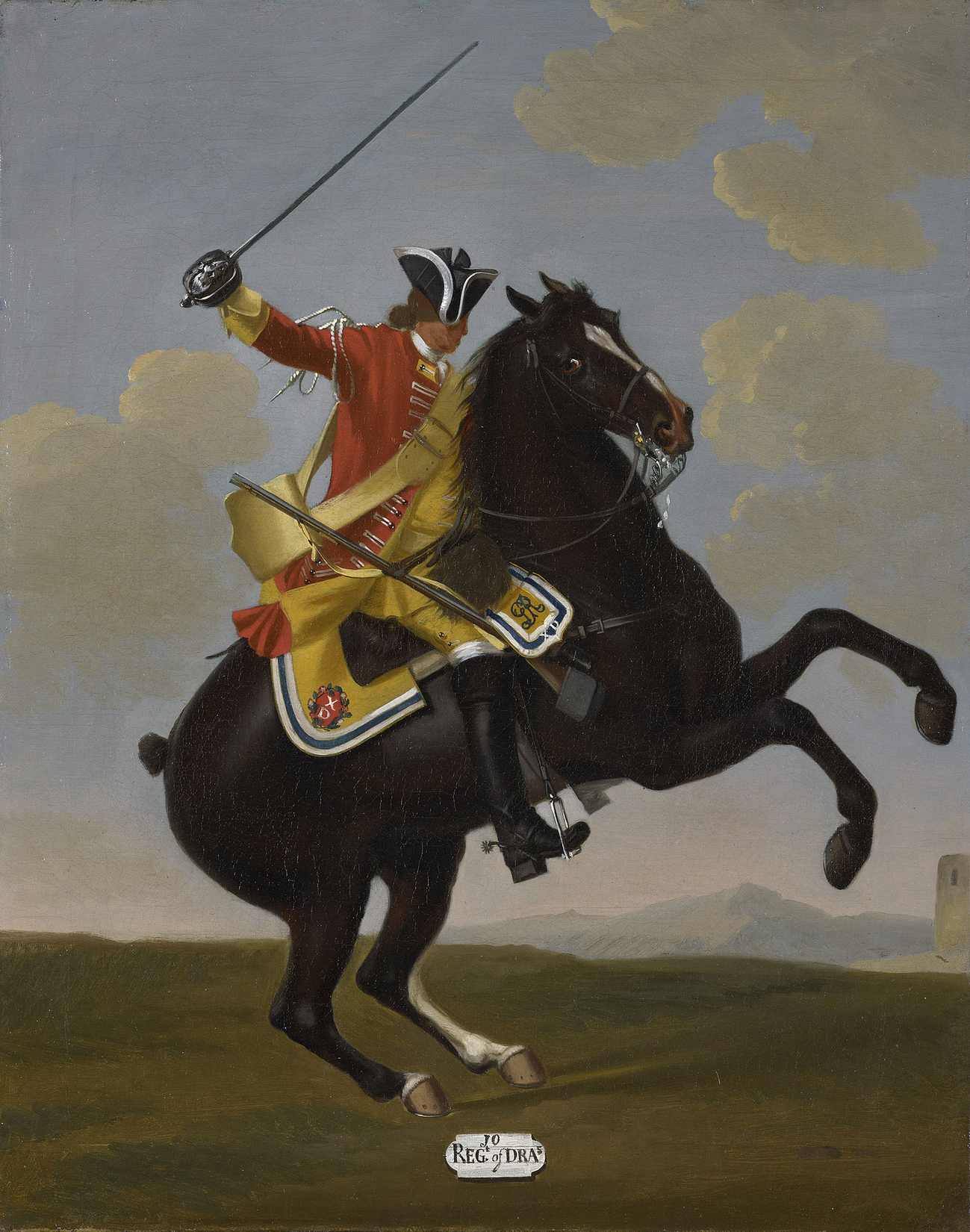
Private, 10th Dragoons

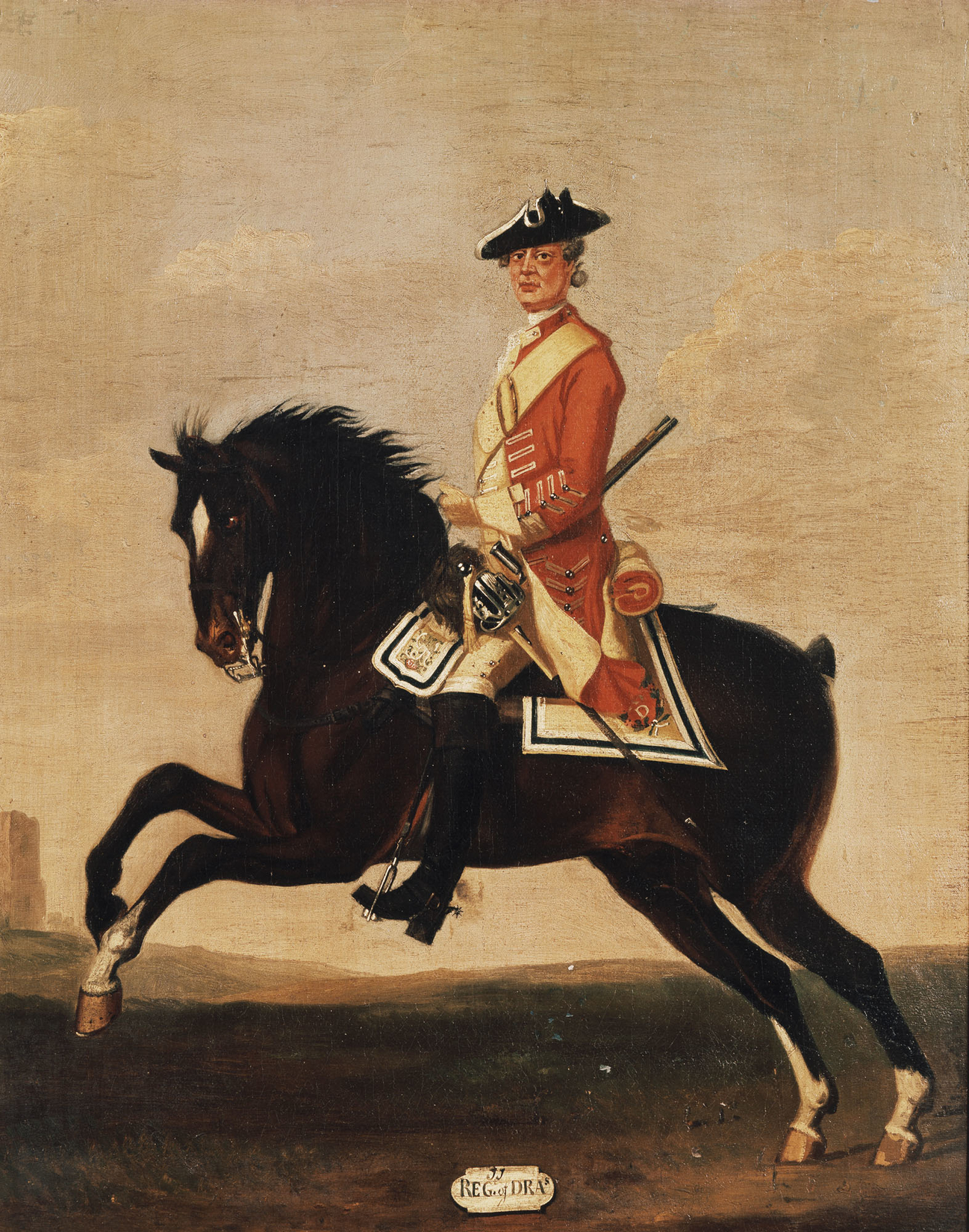
Private, 11th Dragoons

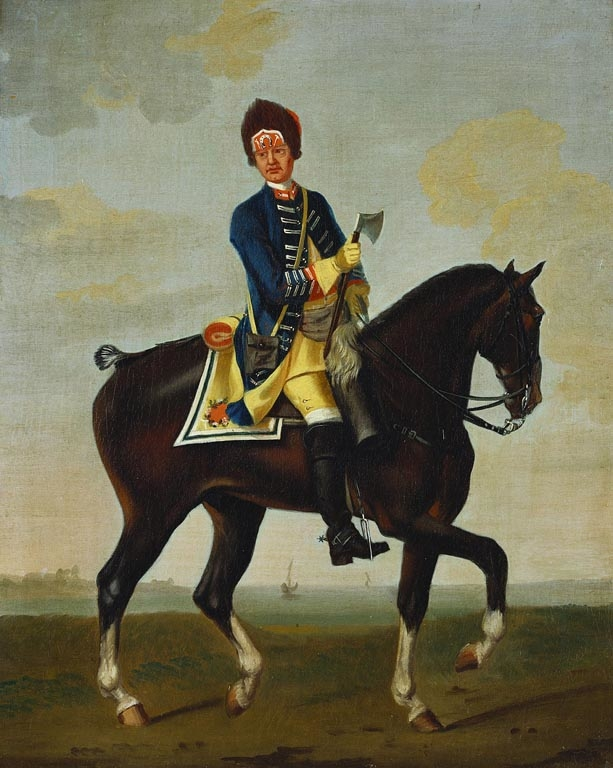
Farrier, 11th Dragoons

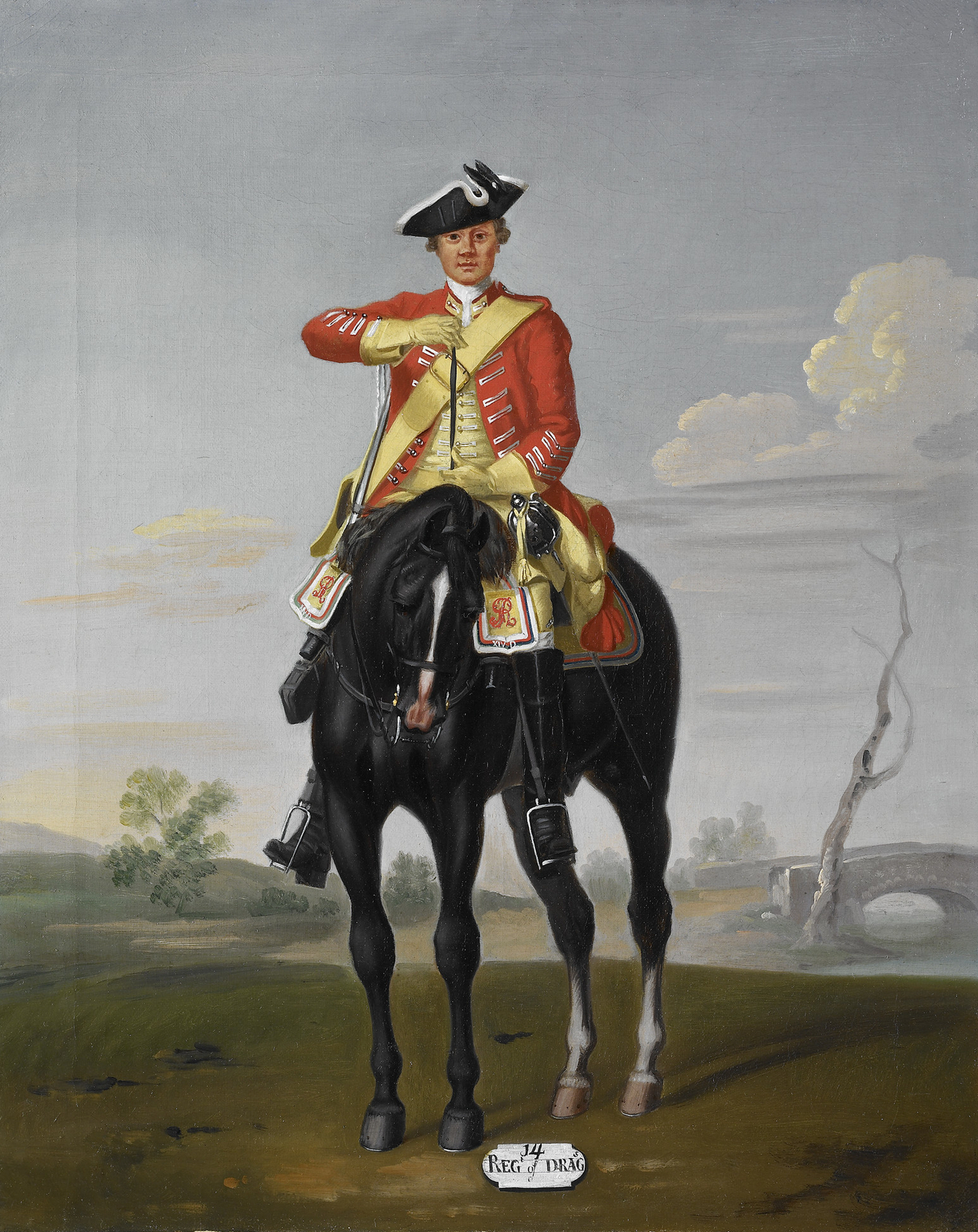
Private, 14th Dragoons

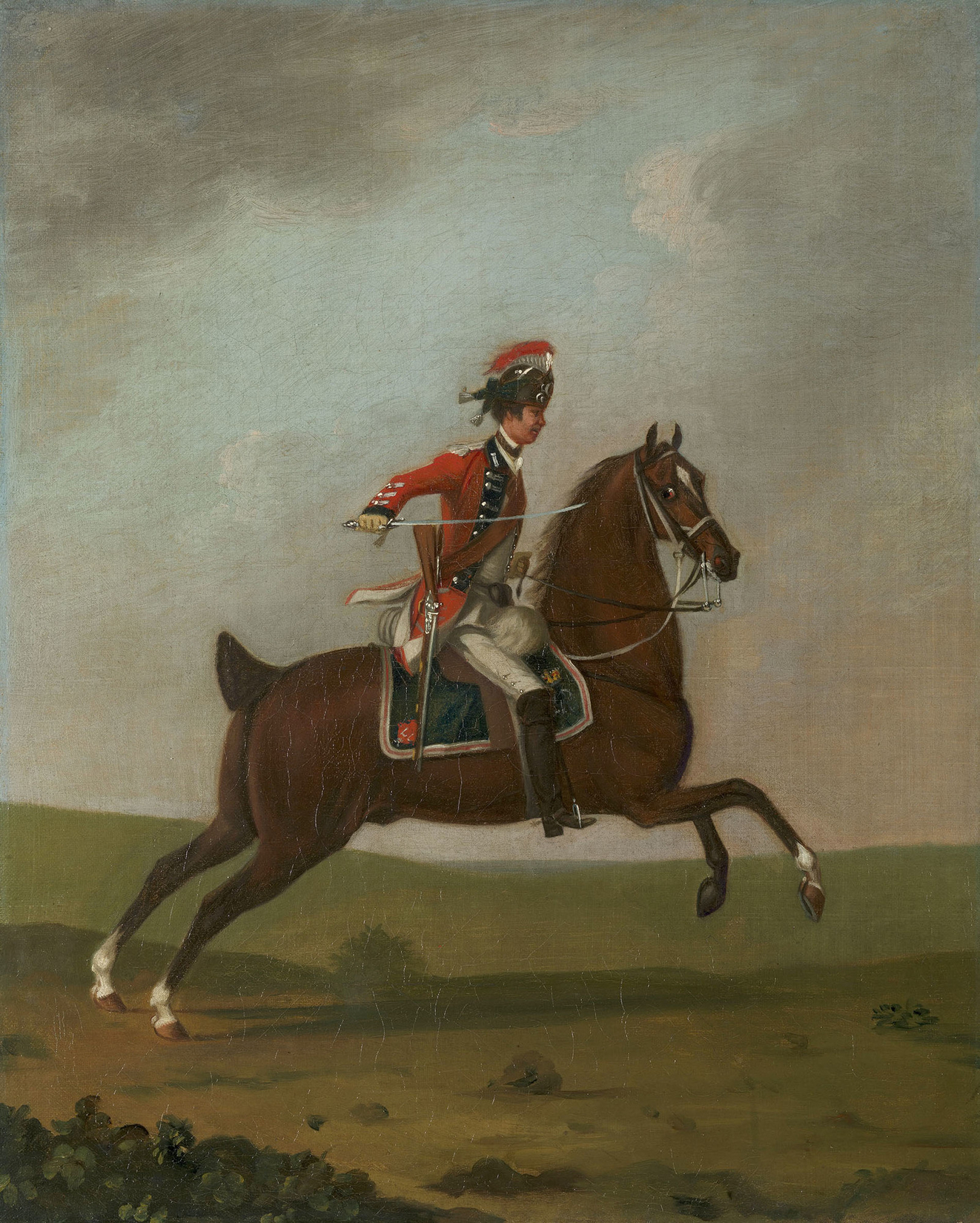
Private, 15th Light Dragoons

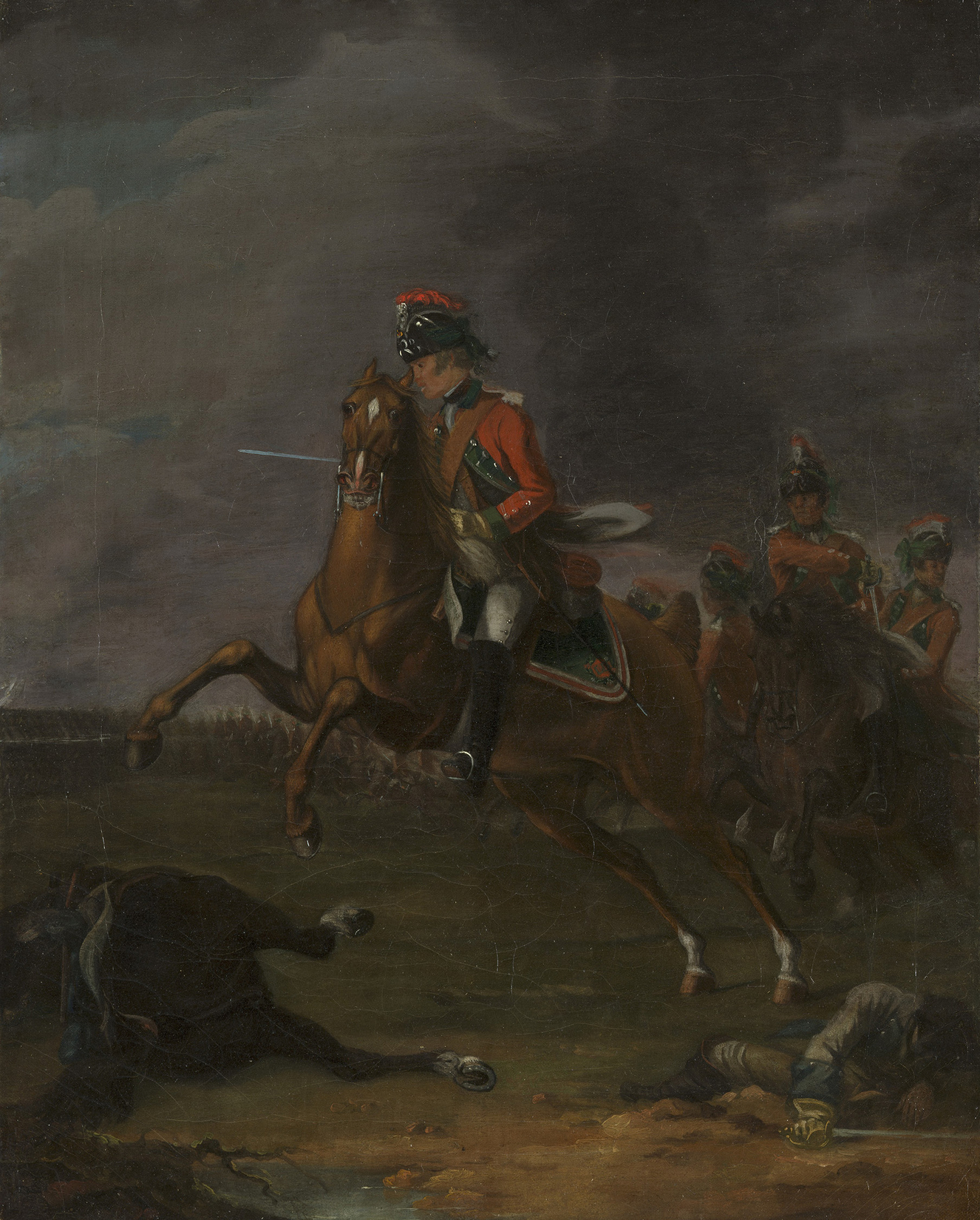
Battle Scene, 15th Light Dragoons

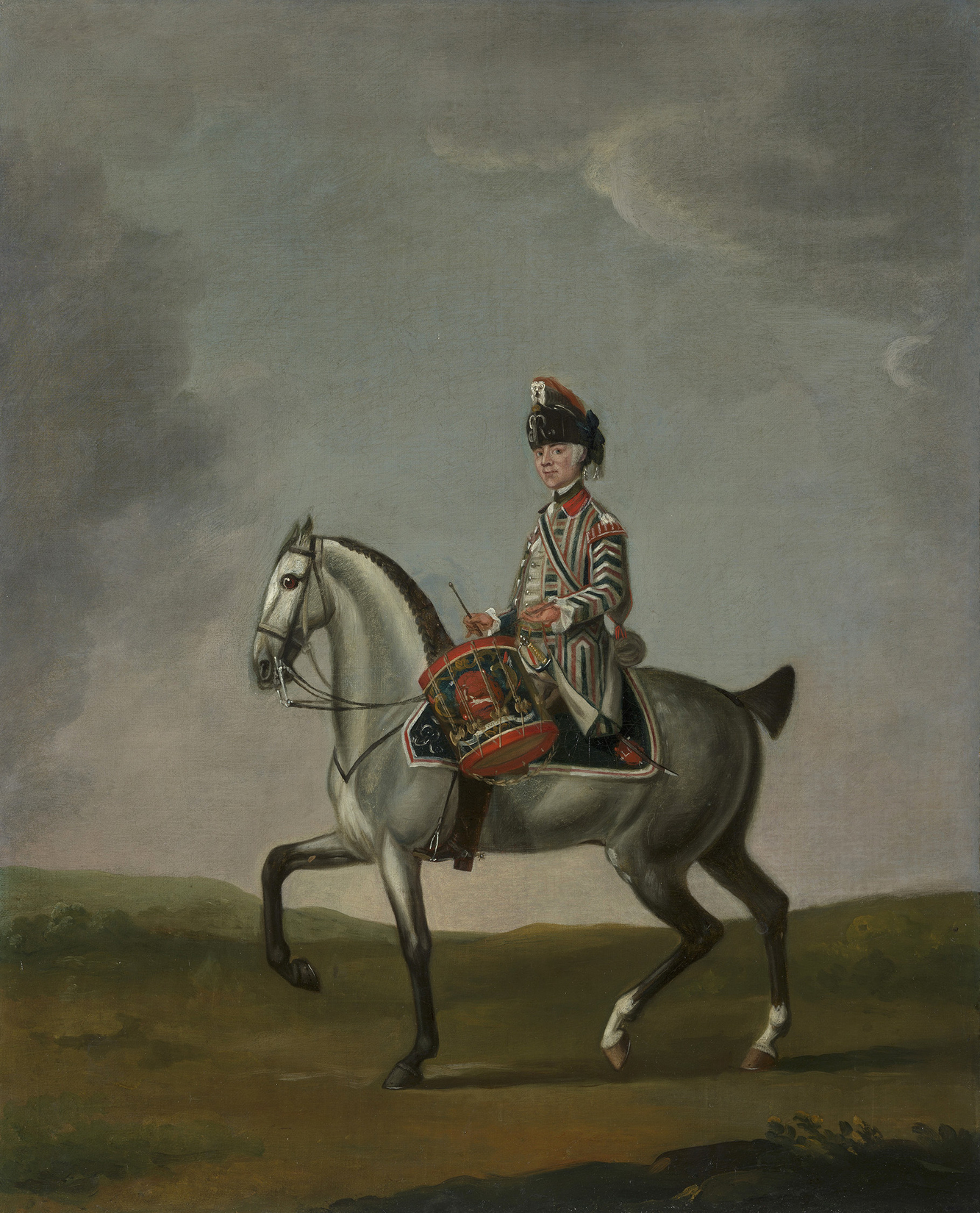
Drummer, 15th Light Dragoons

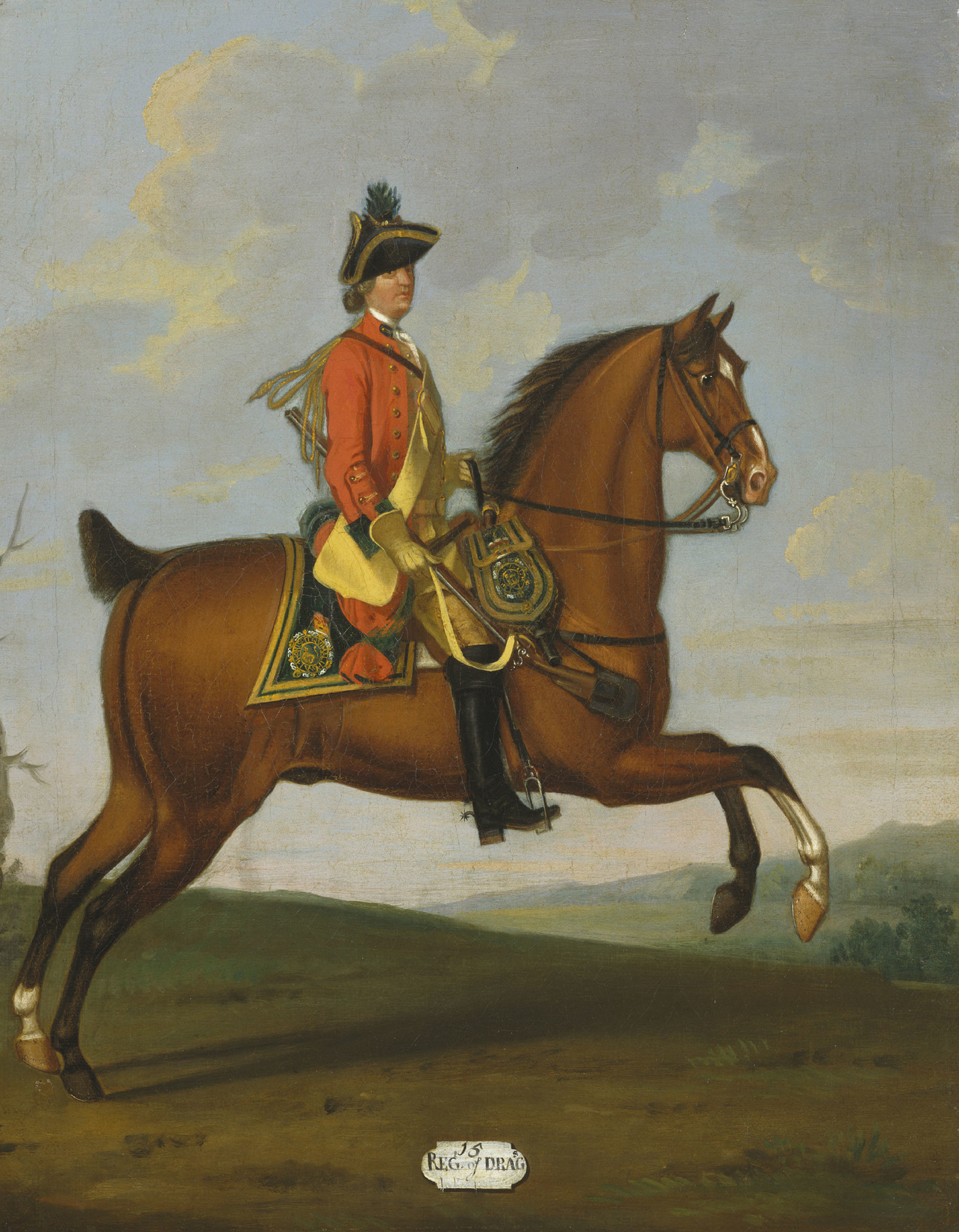
Private, 15th (The Duke of Cumberland's) Dragoons

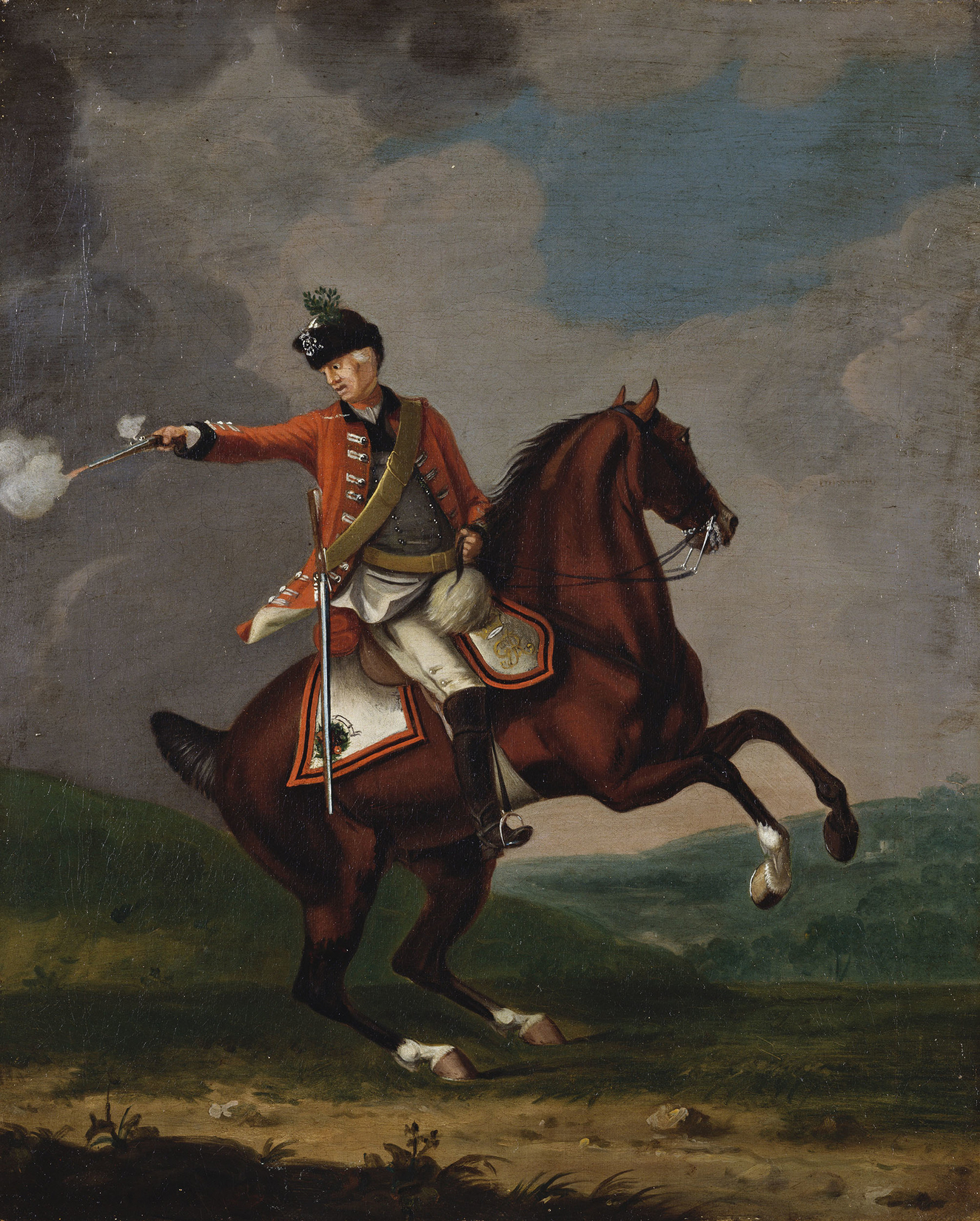
Private, 16th Light Dragoons

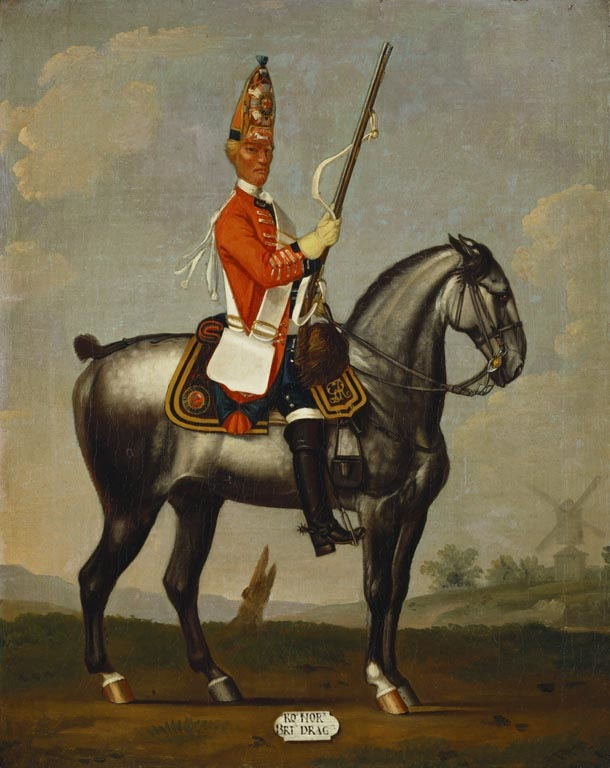
Private, 2nd Royal North British Dragoons

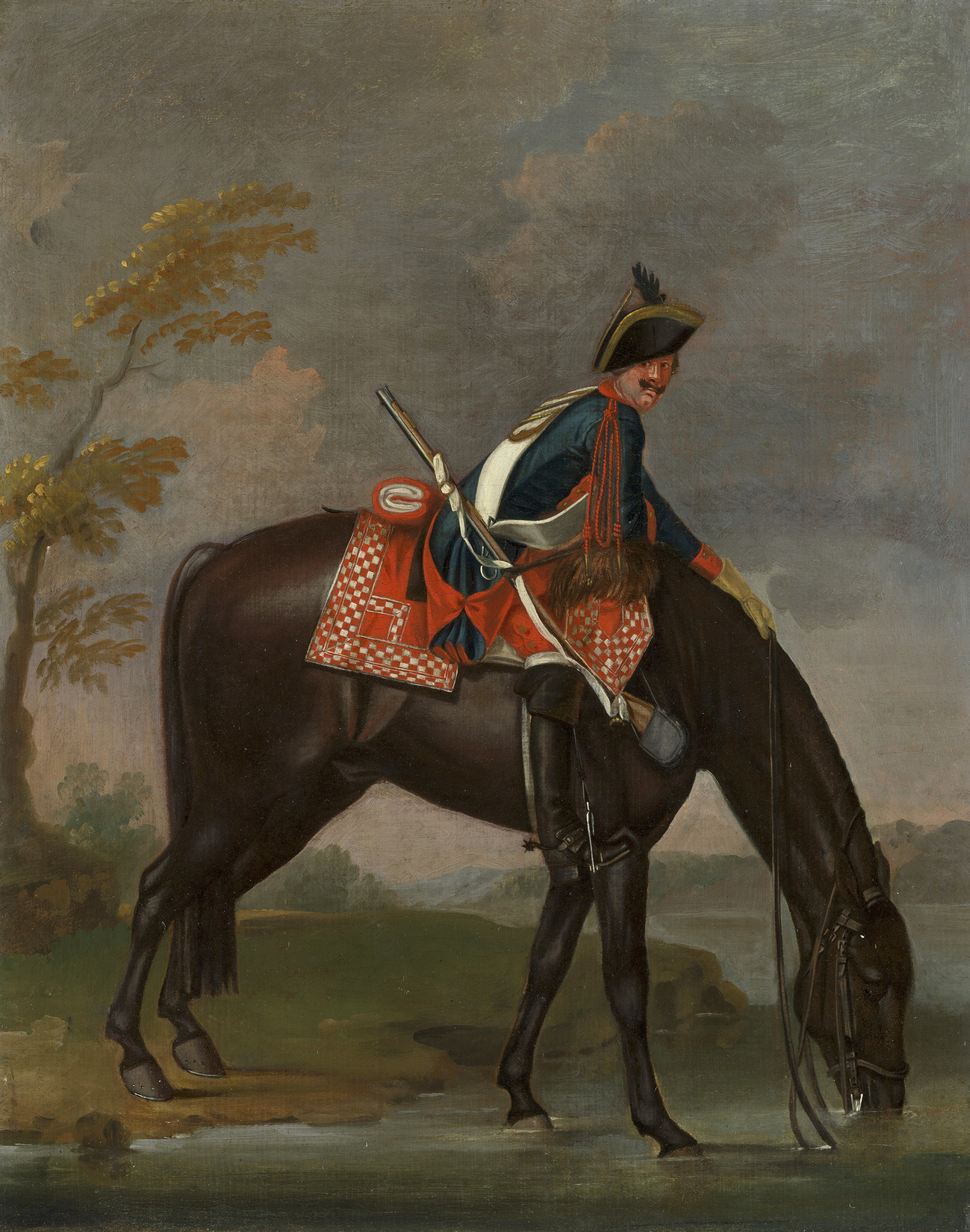
Private, Regiment of Dragoons König

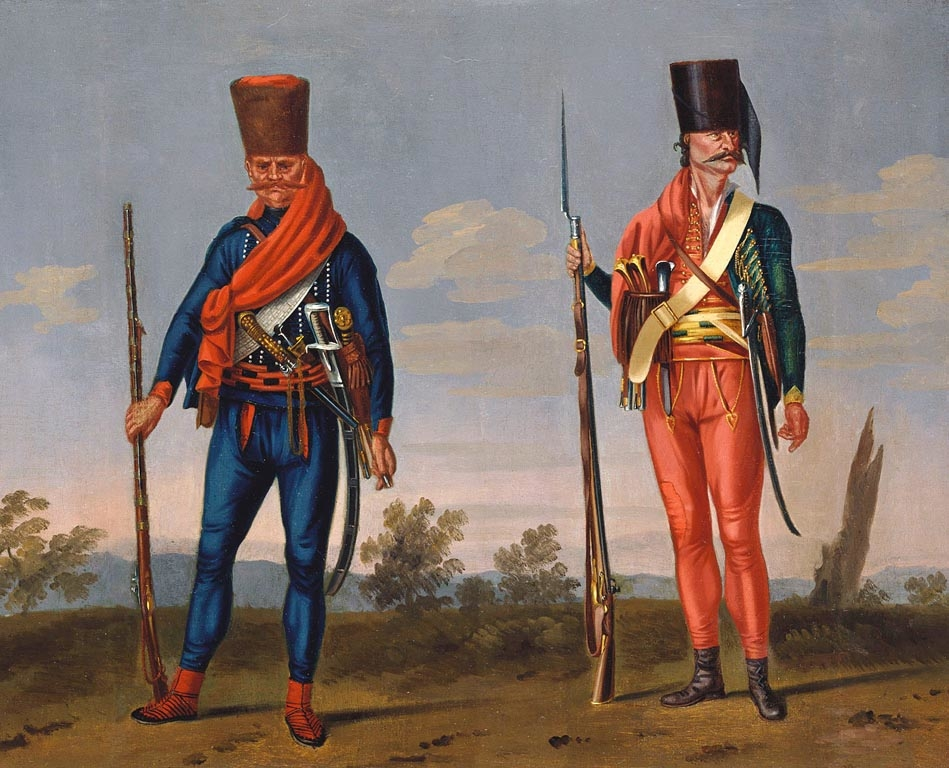
Bannalist and Pandour, Freikorps Trenck

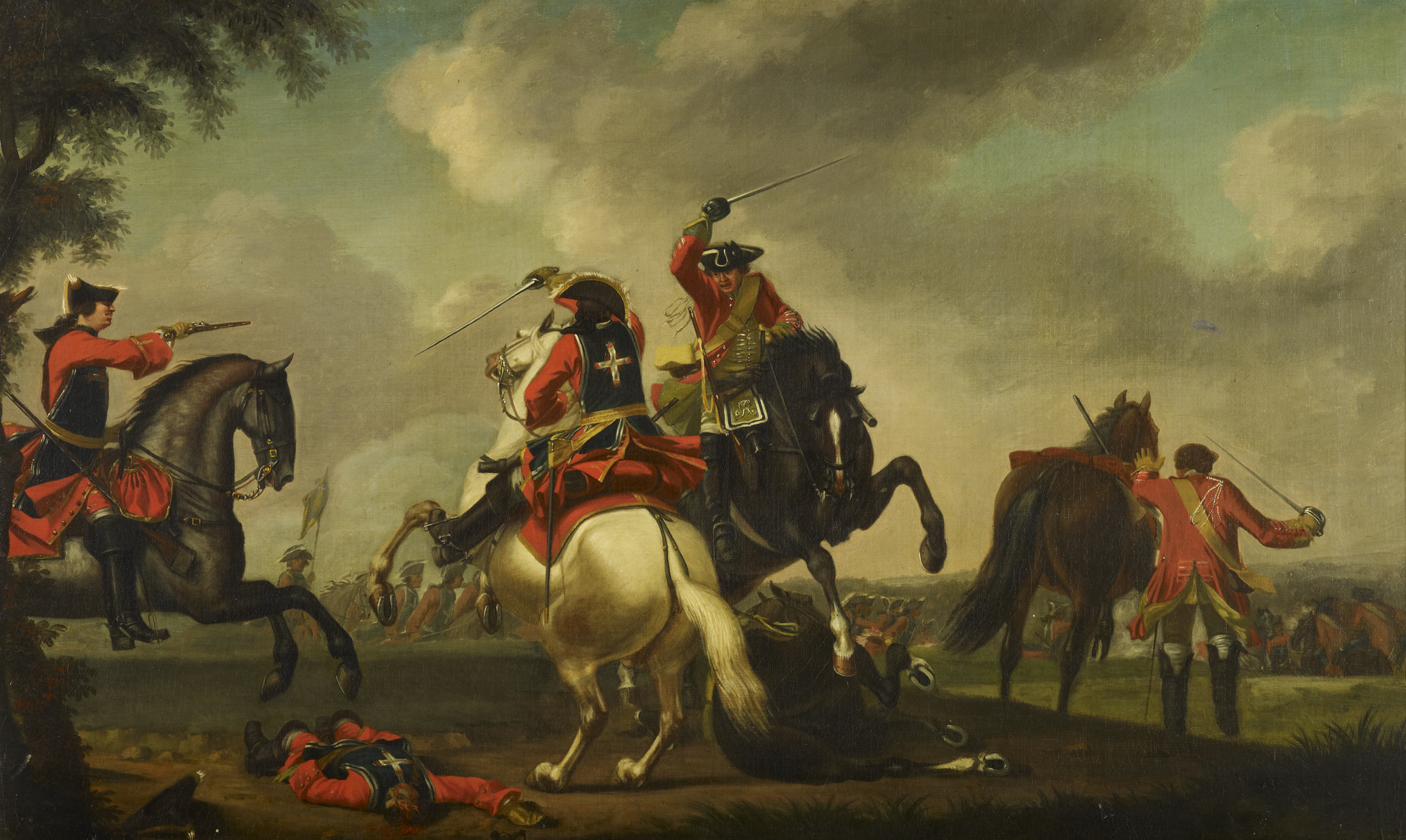
A Skirmish between English and French Cavalry

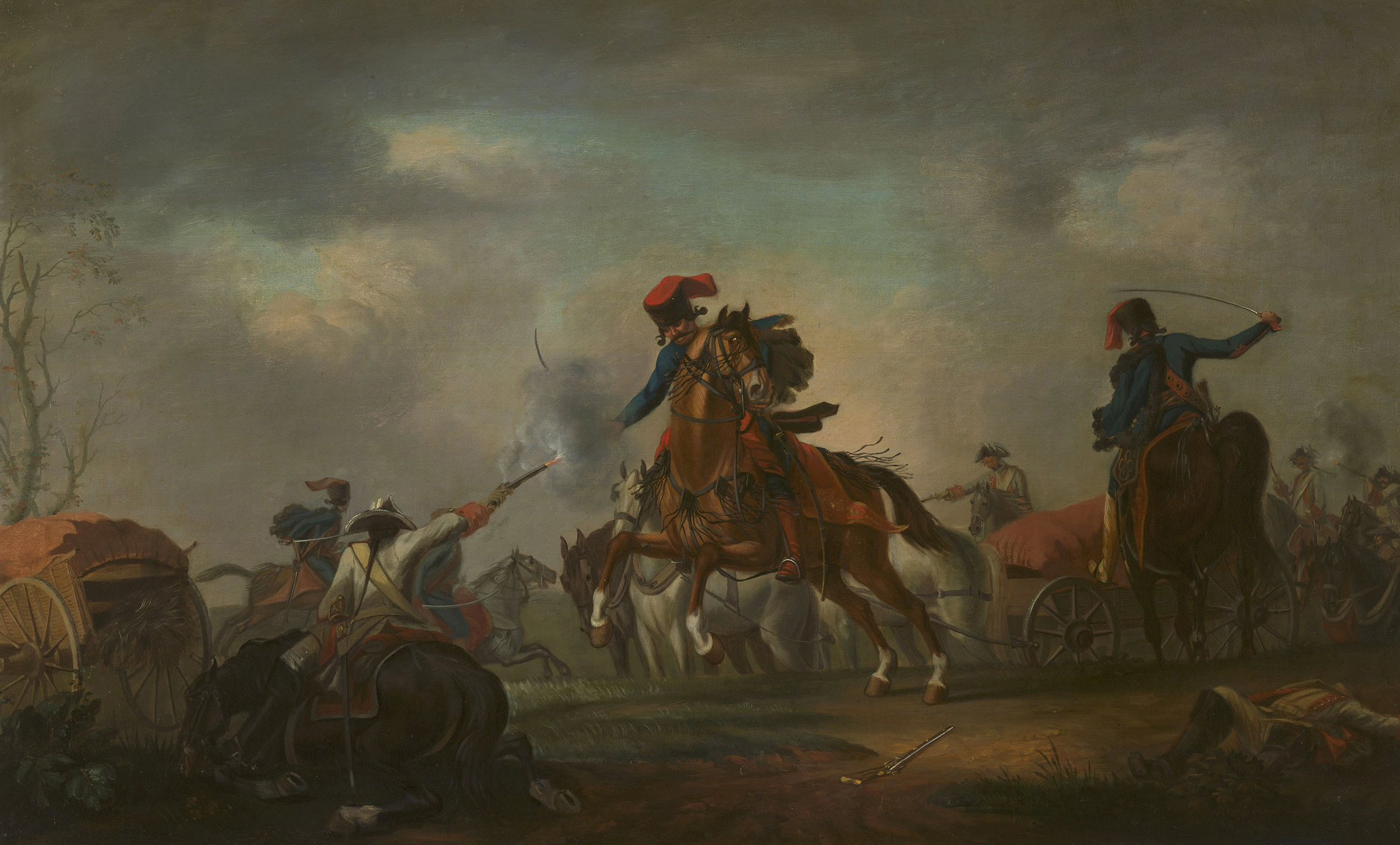
Hussars Attacking a Baggage Wagon

== Gallery III: Royalty and nobility ==
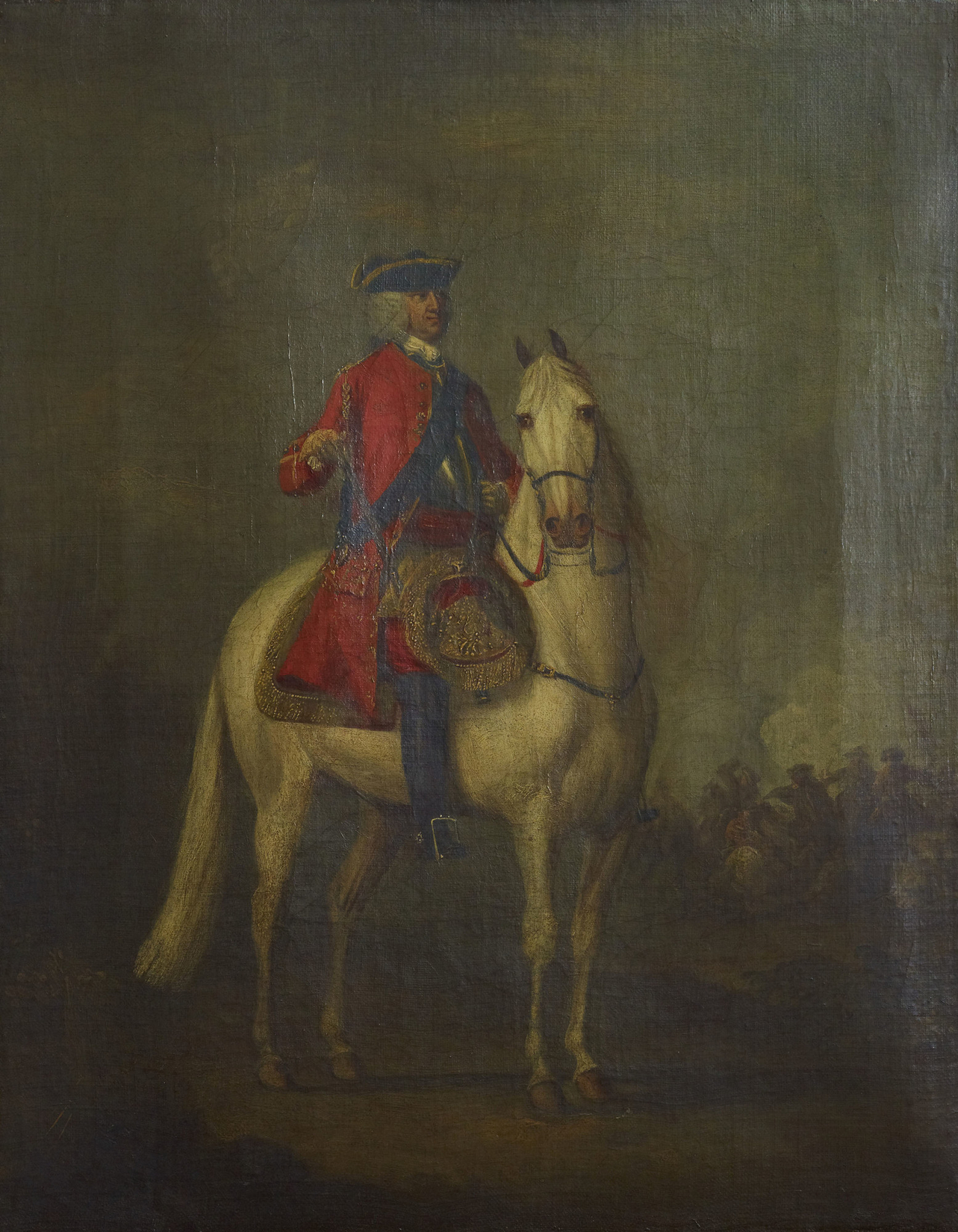
King George II

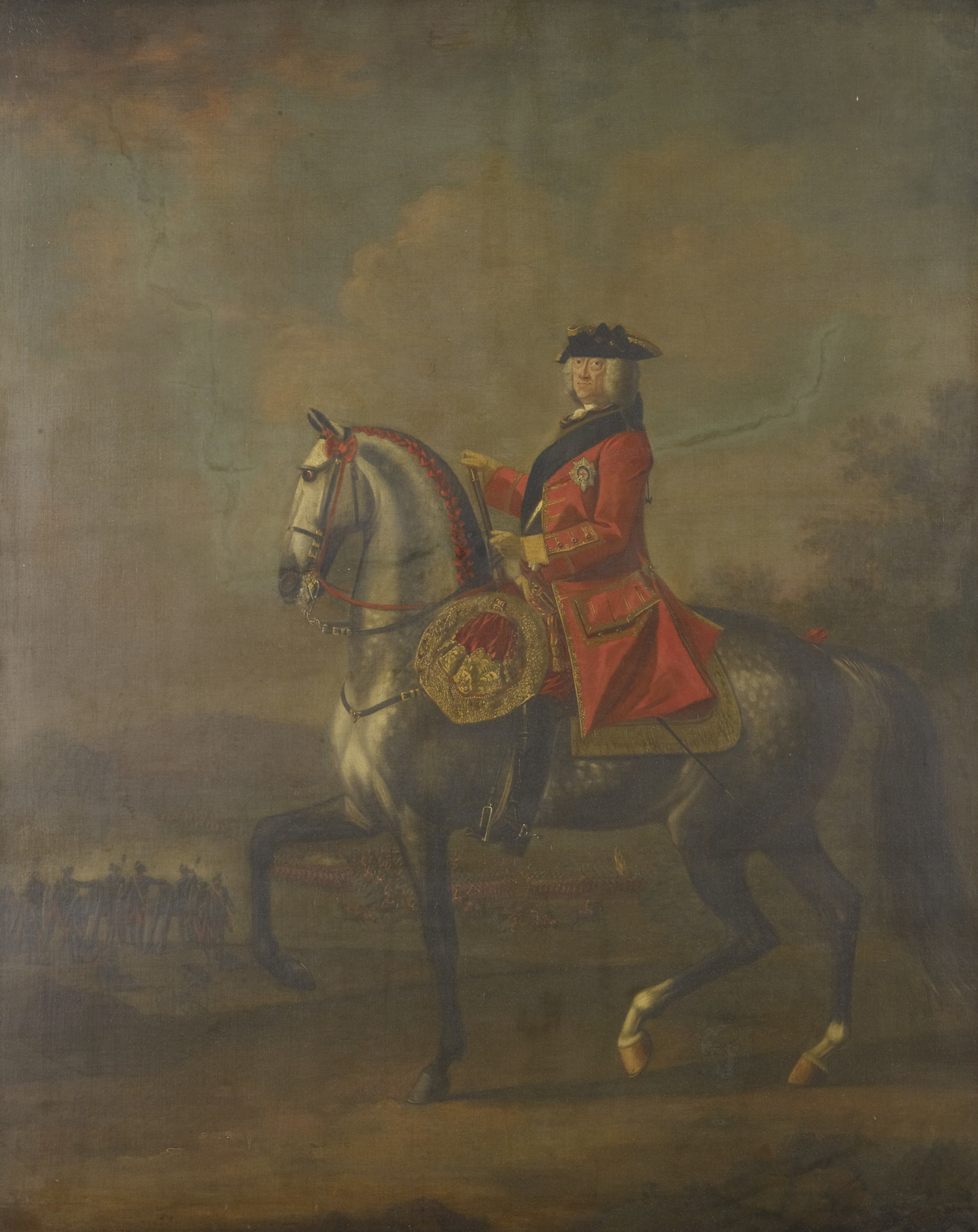
King George II

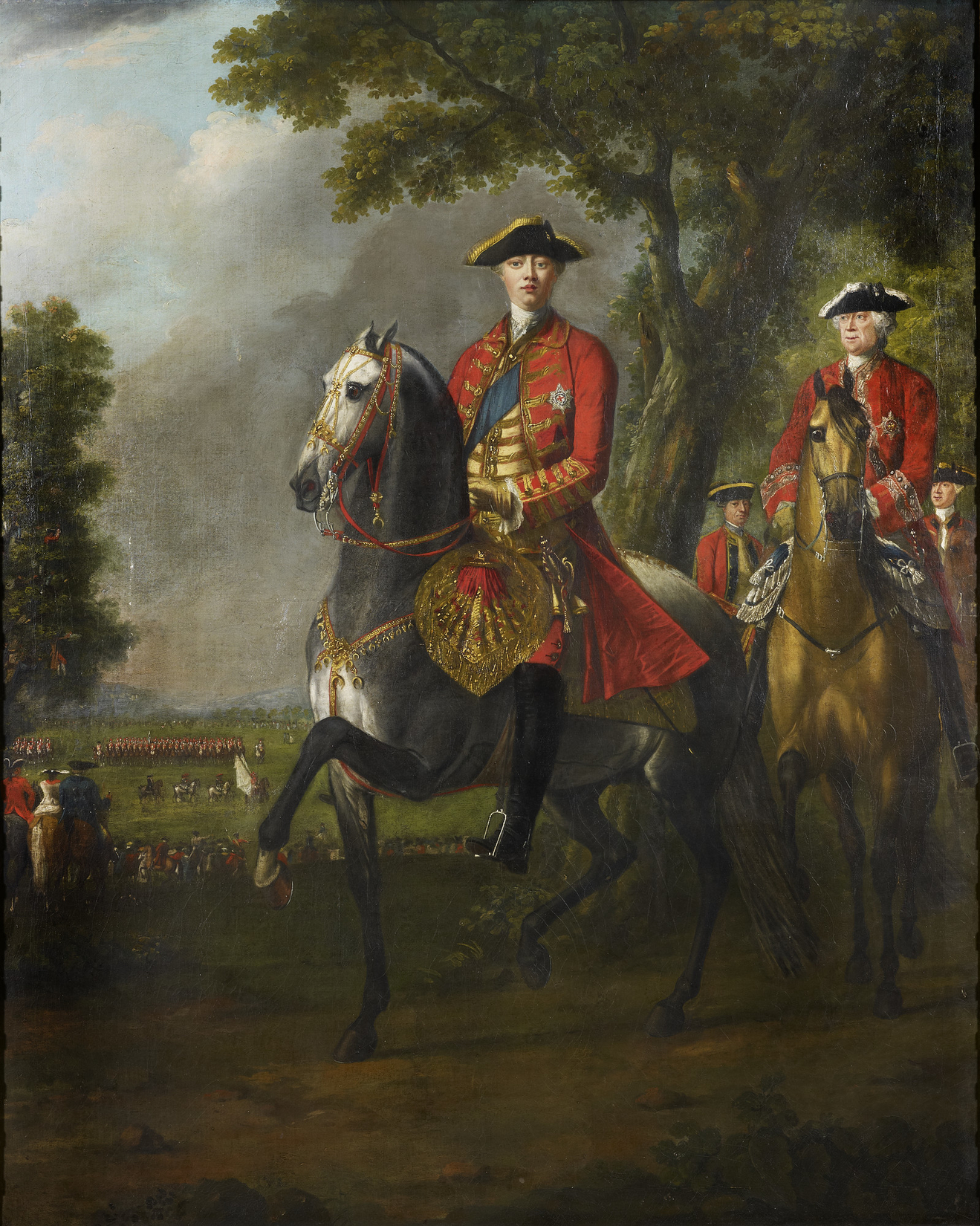
King George III

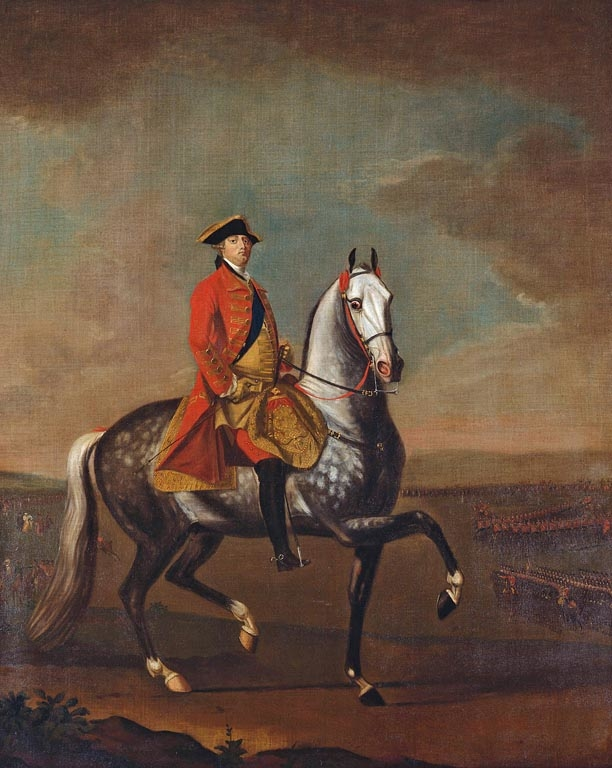
King George III

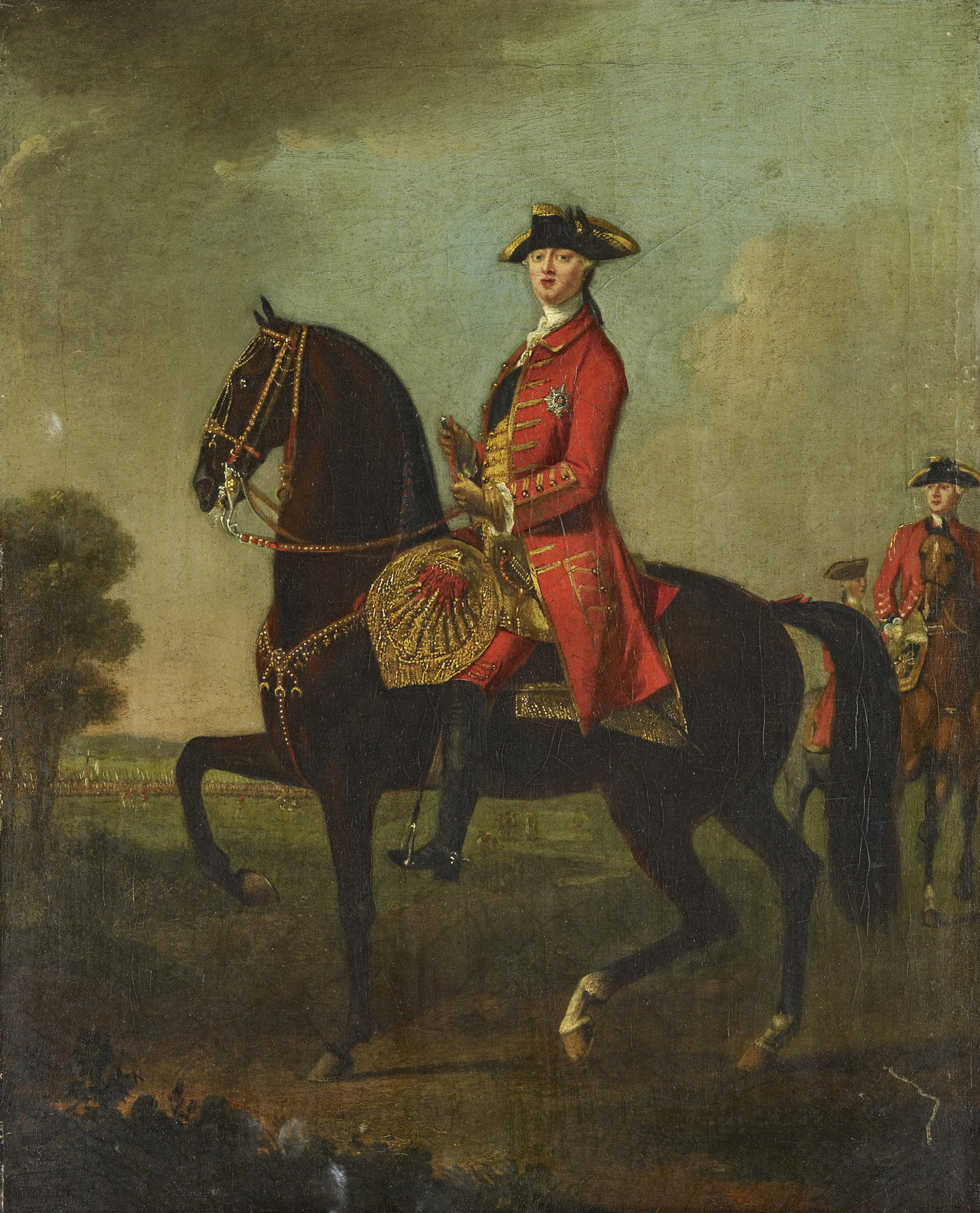
King George III

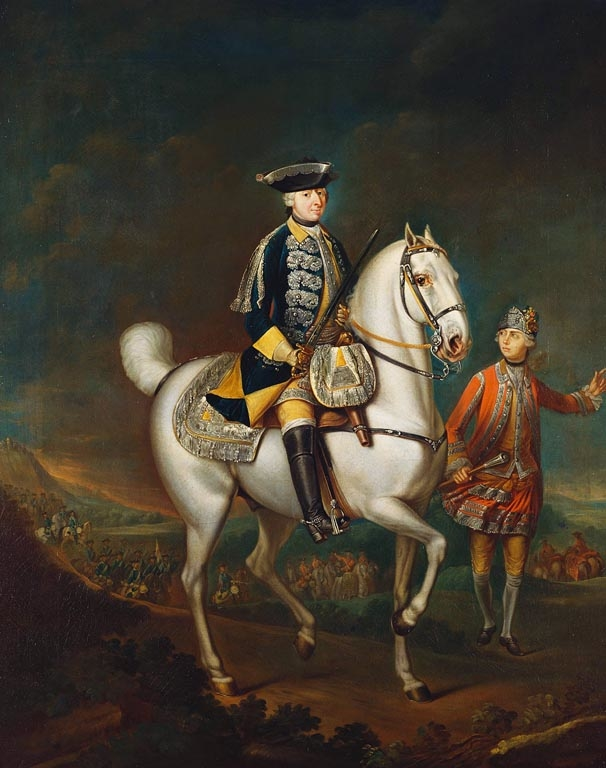
Frederick, Prince of Wales

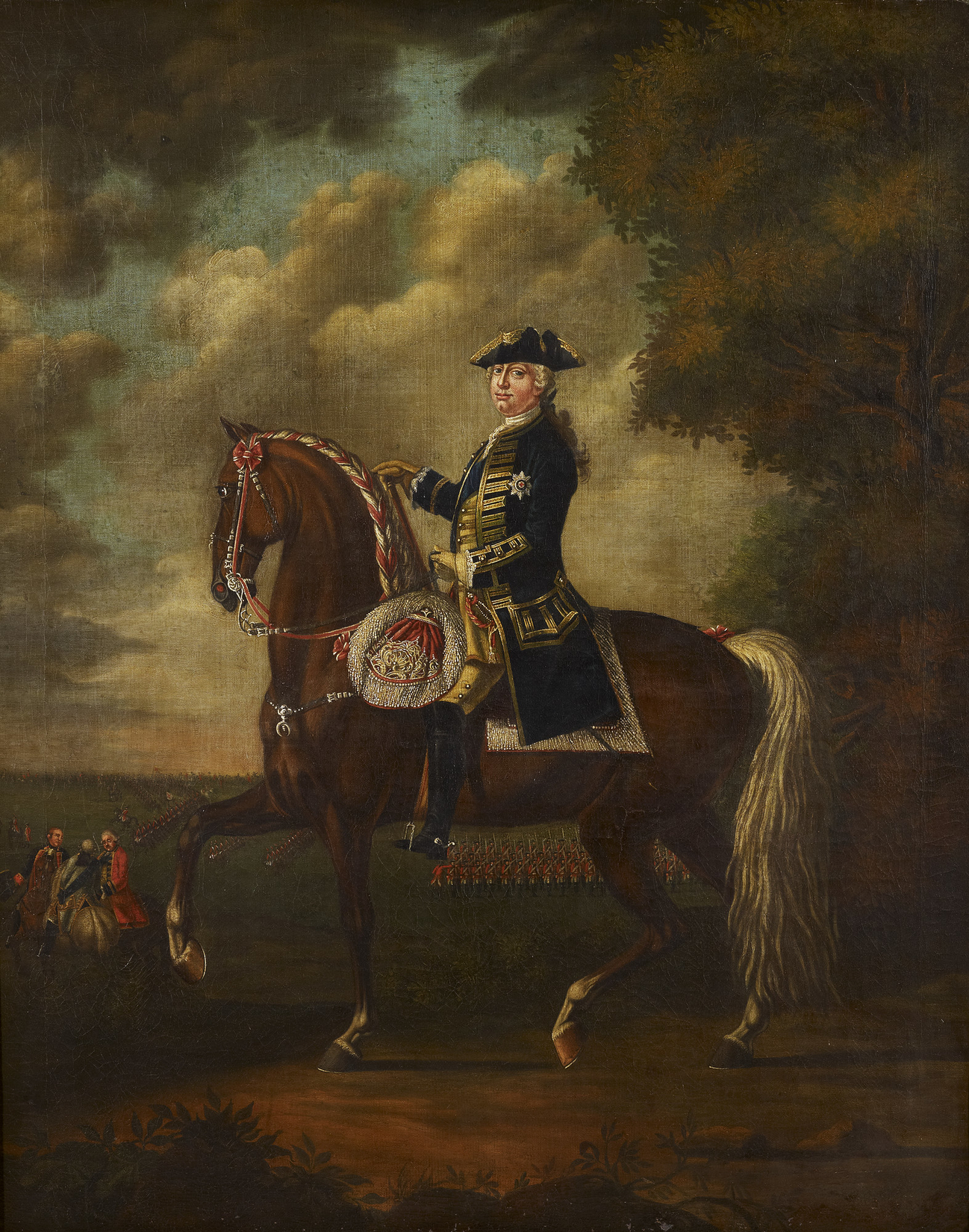
Frederick, Prince of Wales

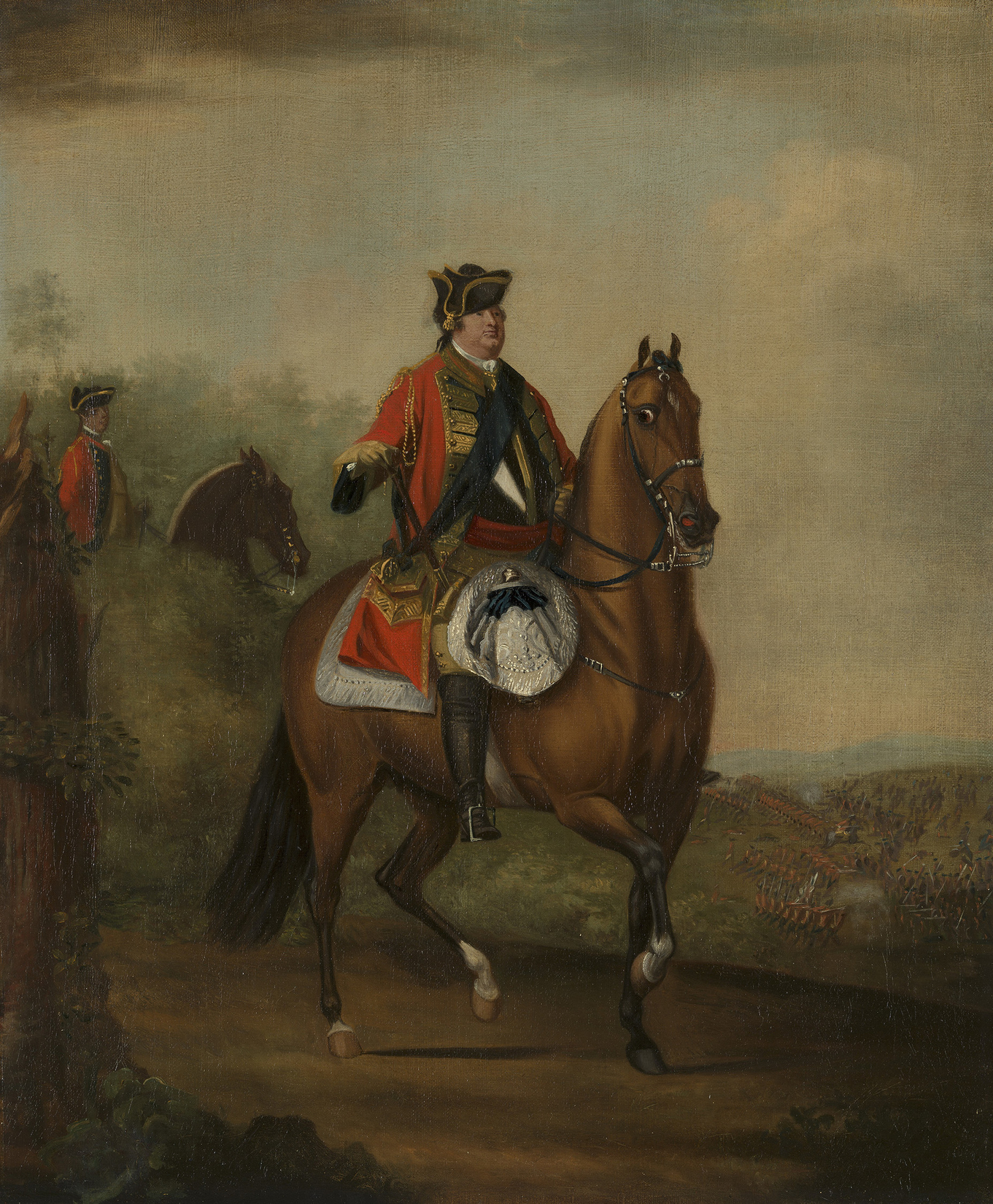
Prince William, Duke of Cumberland

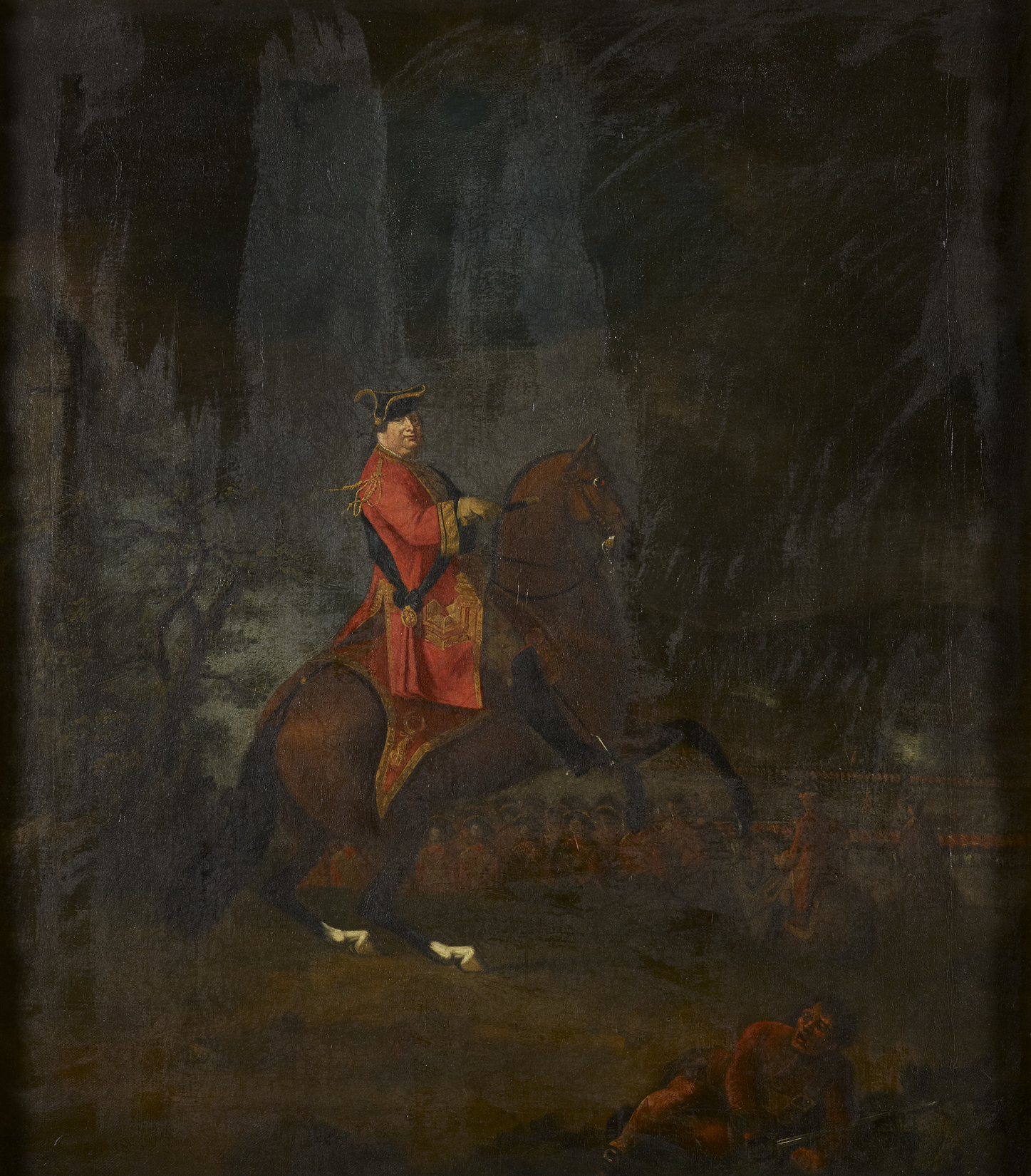
Prince William, Duke of Cumberland

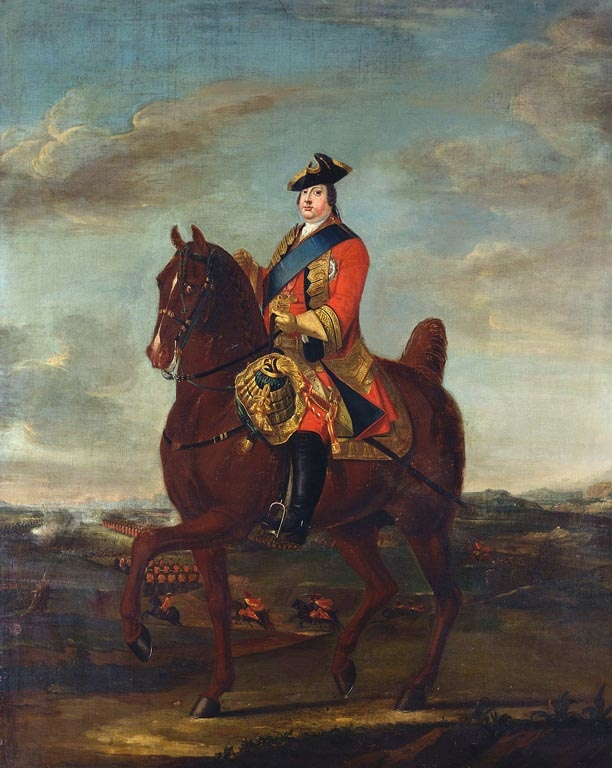
Prince William, Duke of Cumberland

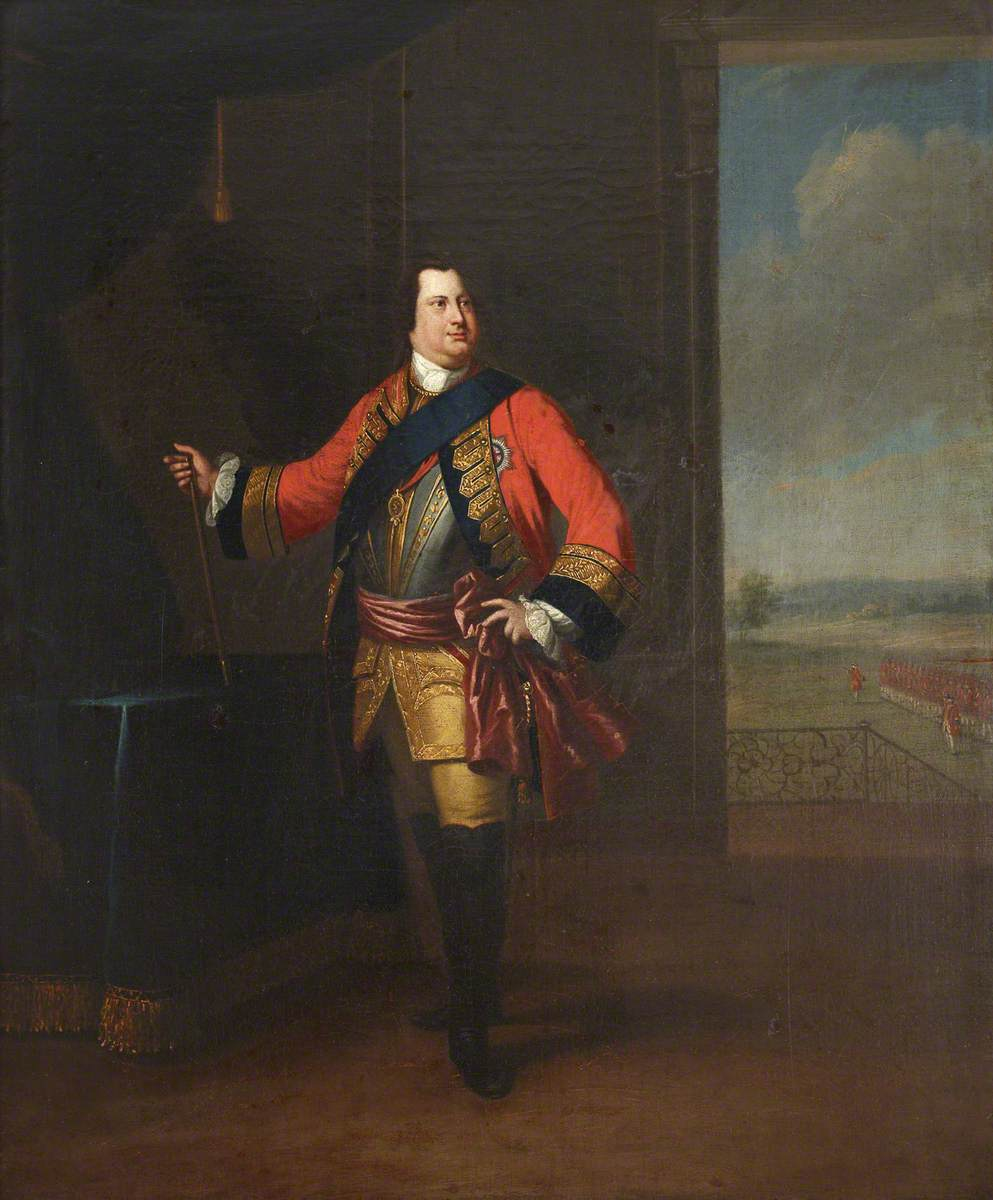
Prince William, Duke of Cumberland

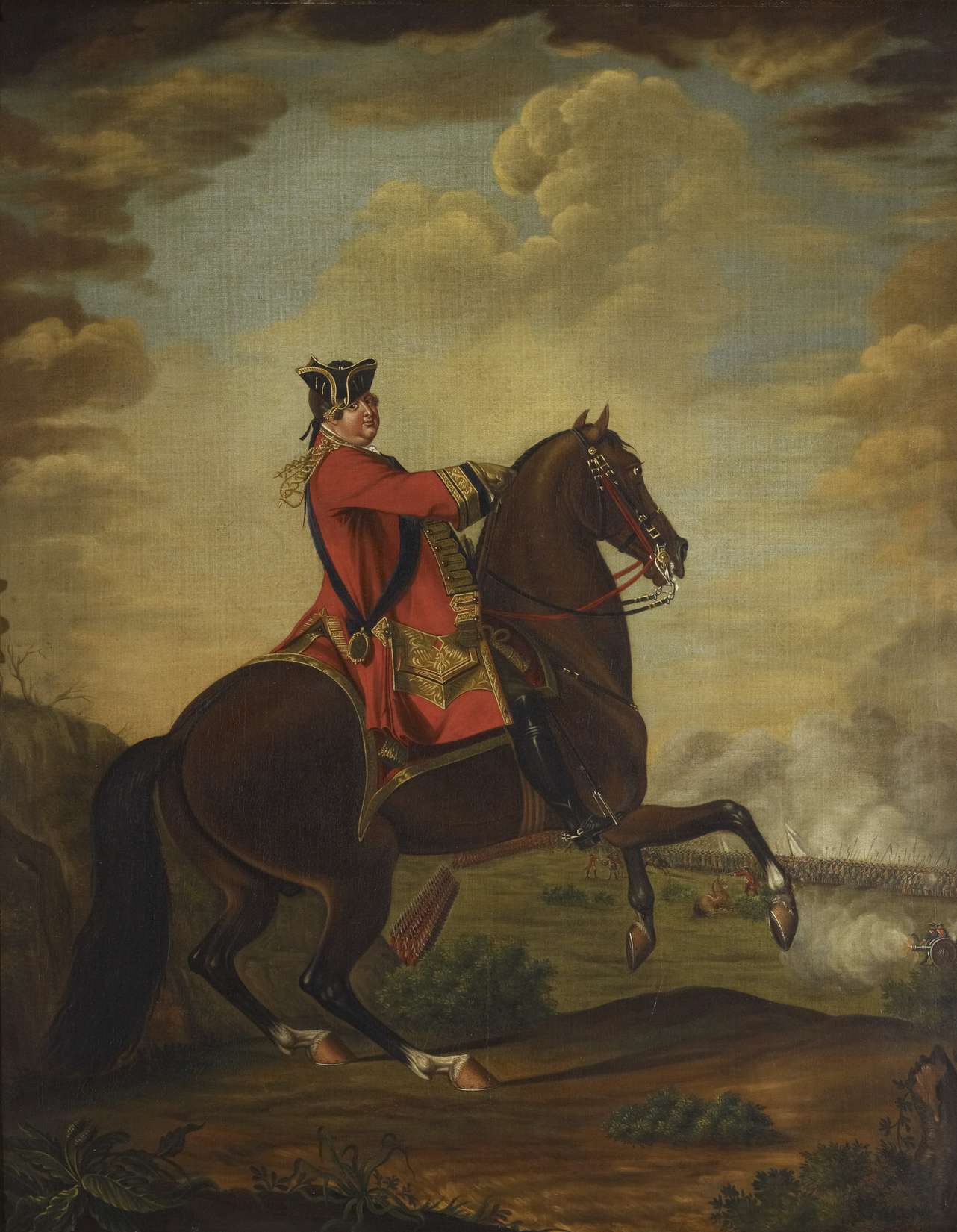
Prince William, Duke of Cumberland

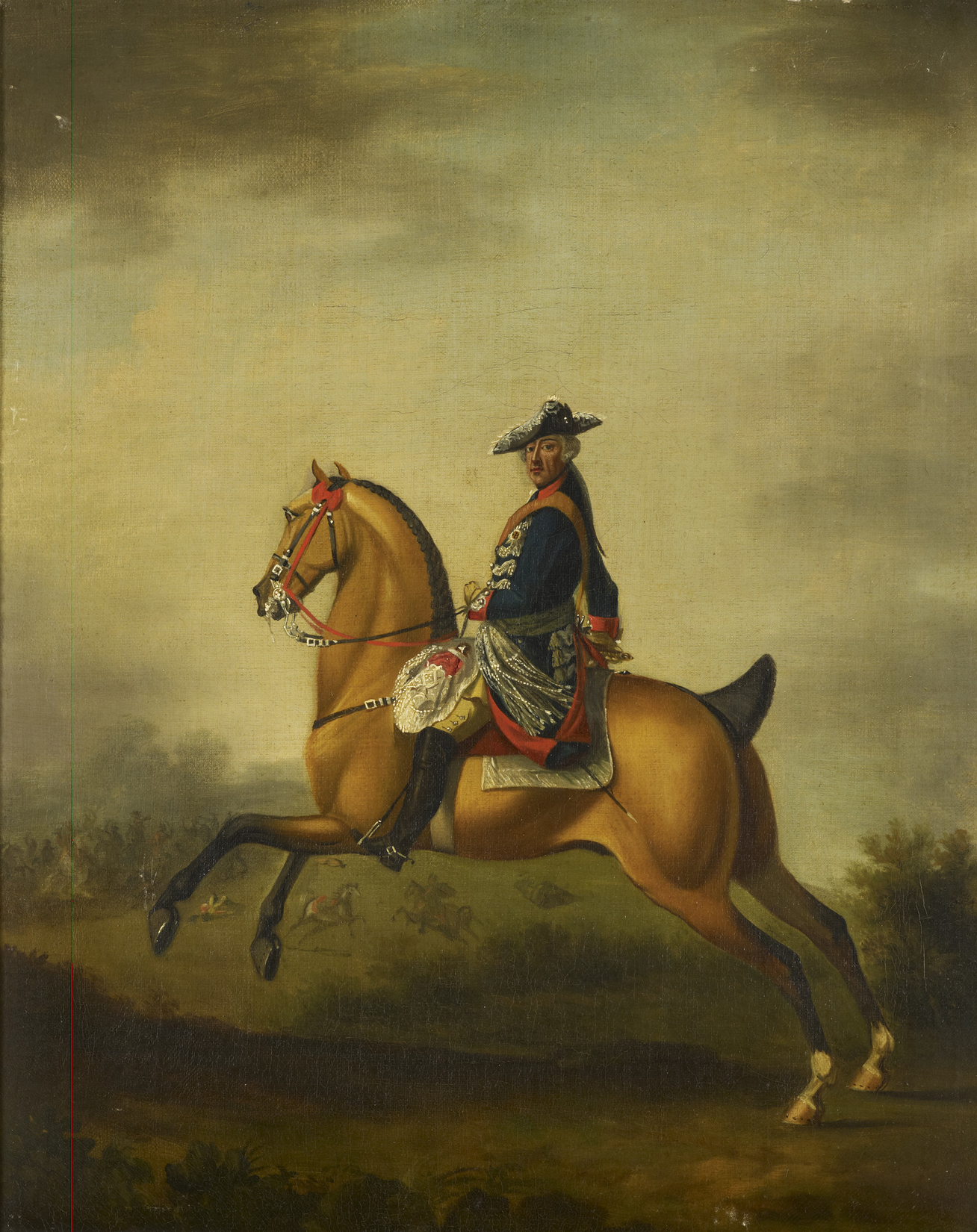
King Frederick II of Prussia

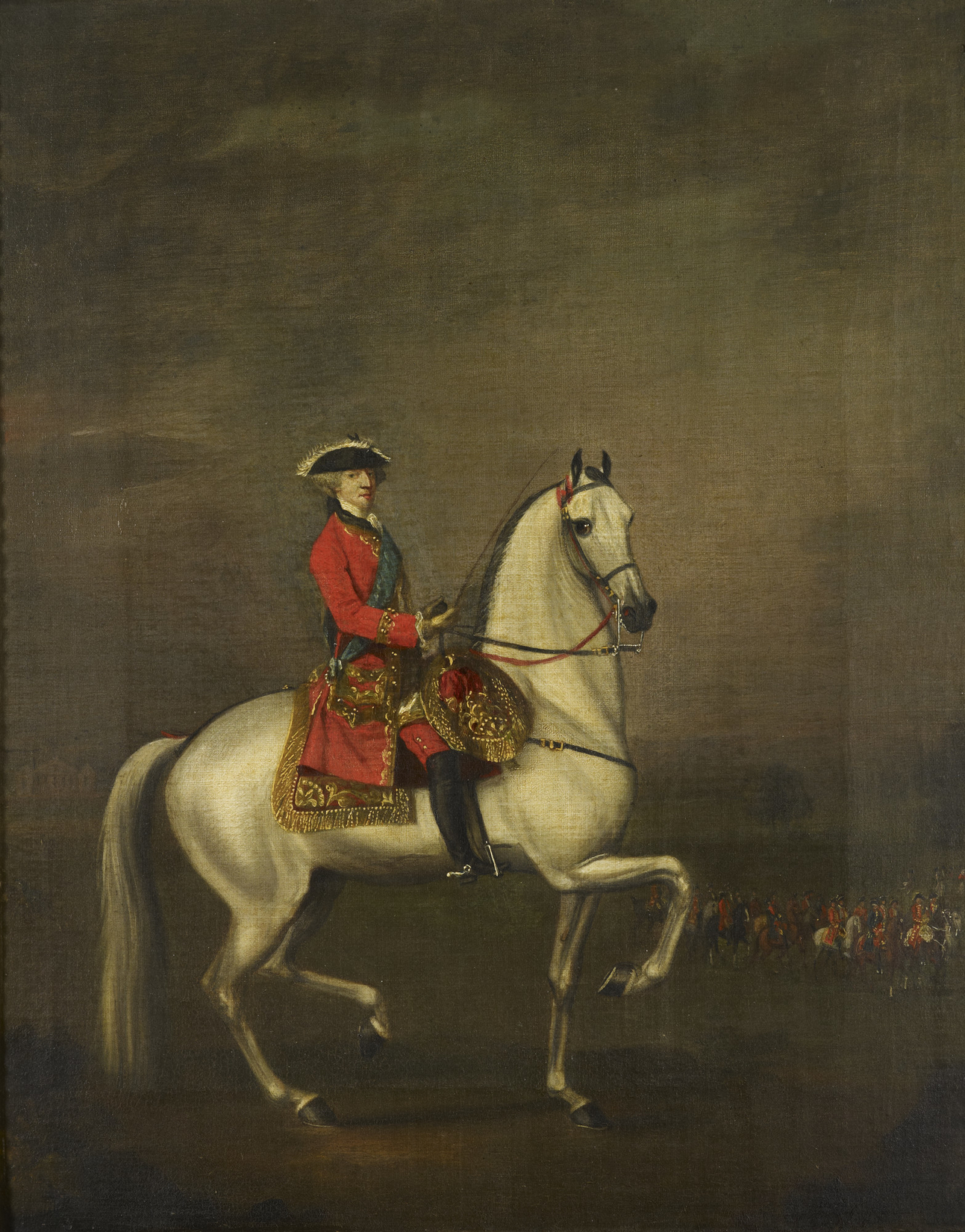
King Frederick V of Denmark

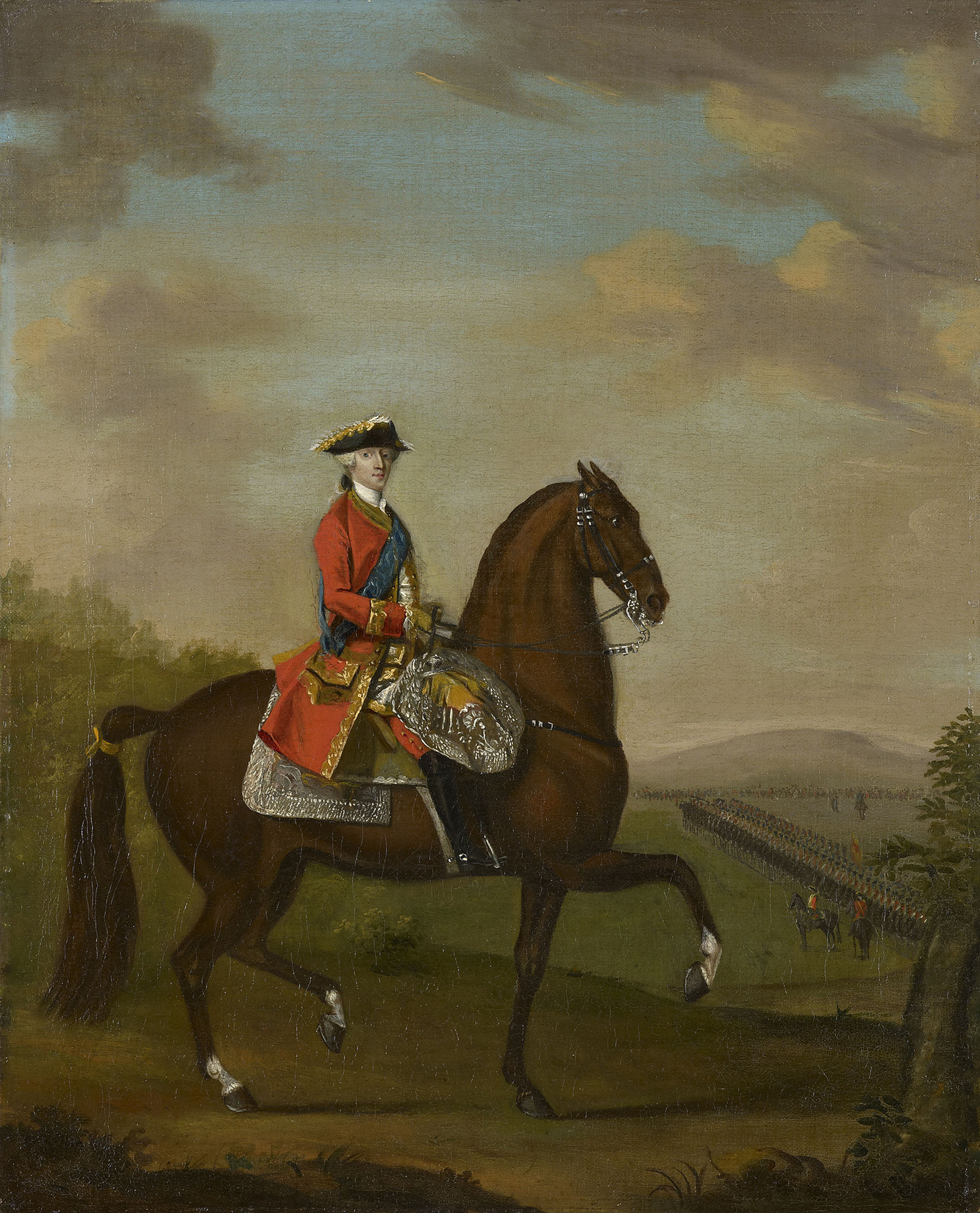
King Frederick V of Denmark

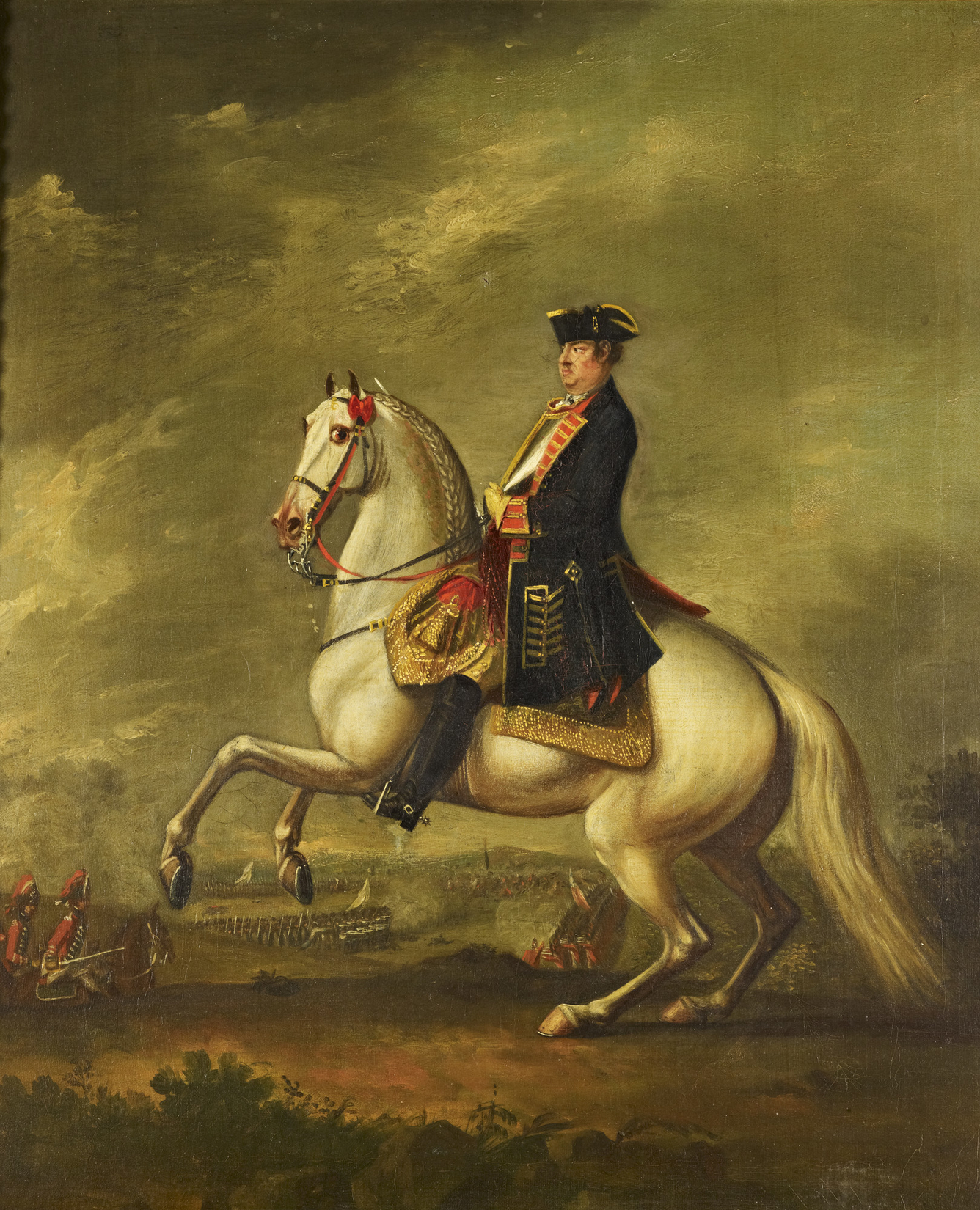
John Manners, Marquess of Granby

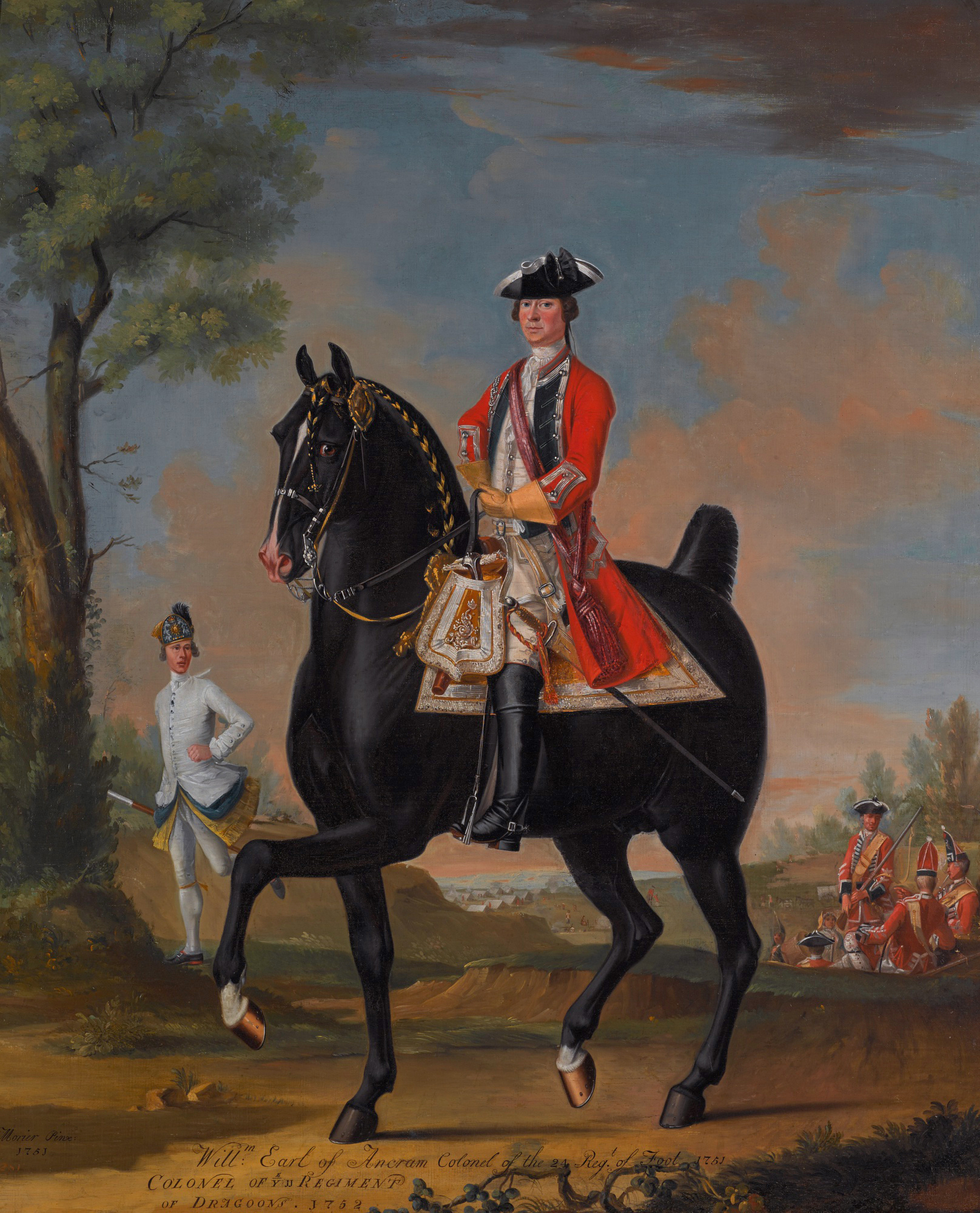
General William Kerr, 4th Marquess of Lothian, on a charger, his aide-de-camp to the left, and a military encampment beyond

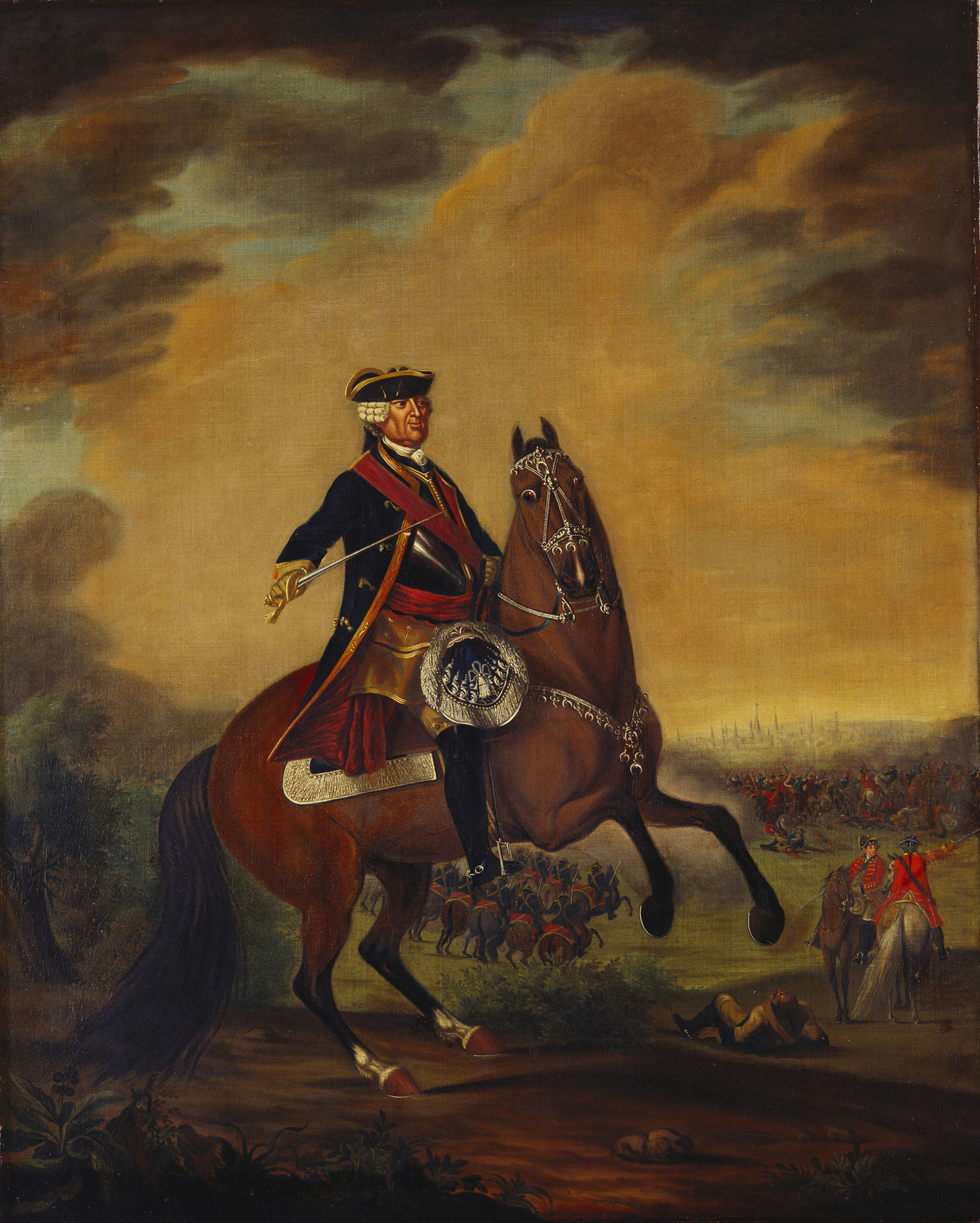
John Ligonier, 1st Earl Ligonier

Henry Herbert, 10th Earl of Pembroke, who commissioned David Morier to paint eight paintings of the 15th light dragoons

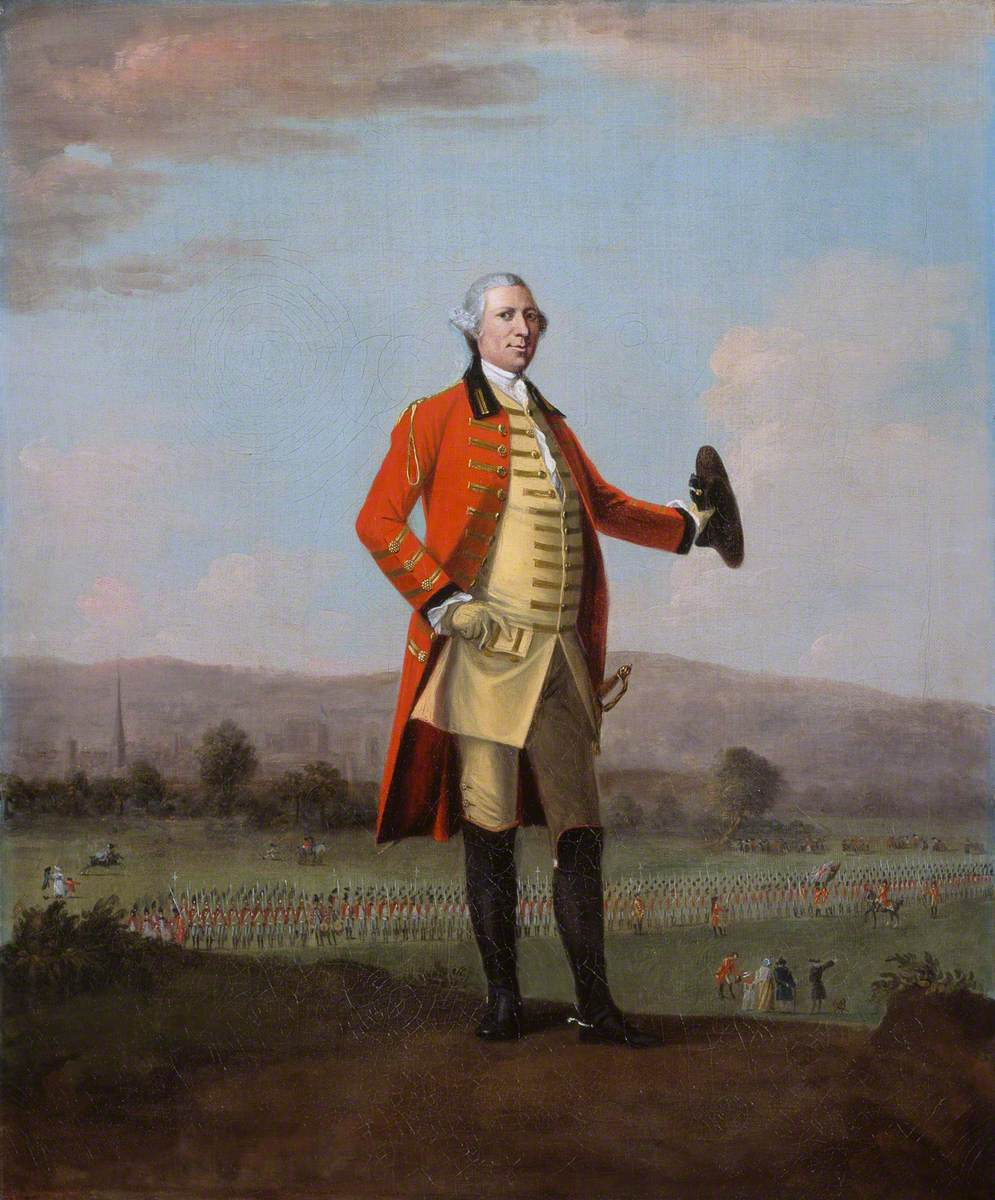
Sir Armine Wodehouse, 5th Baronet

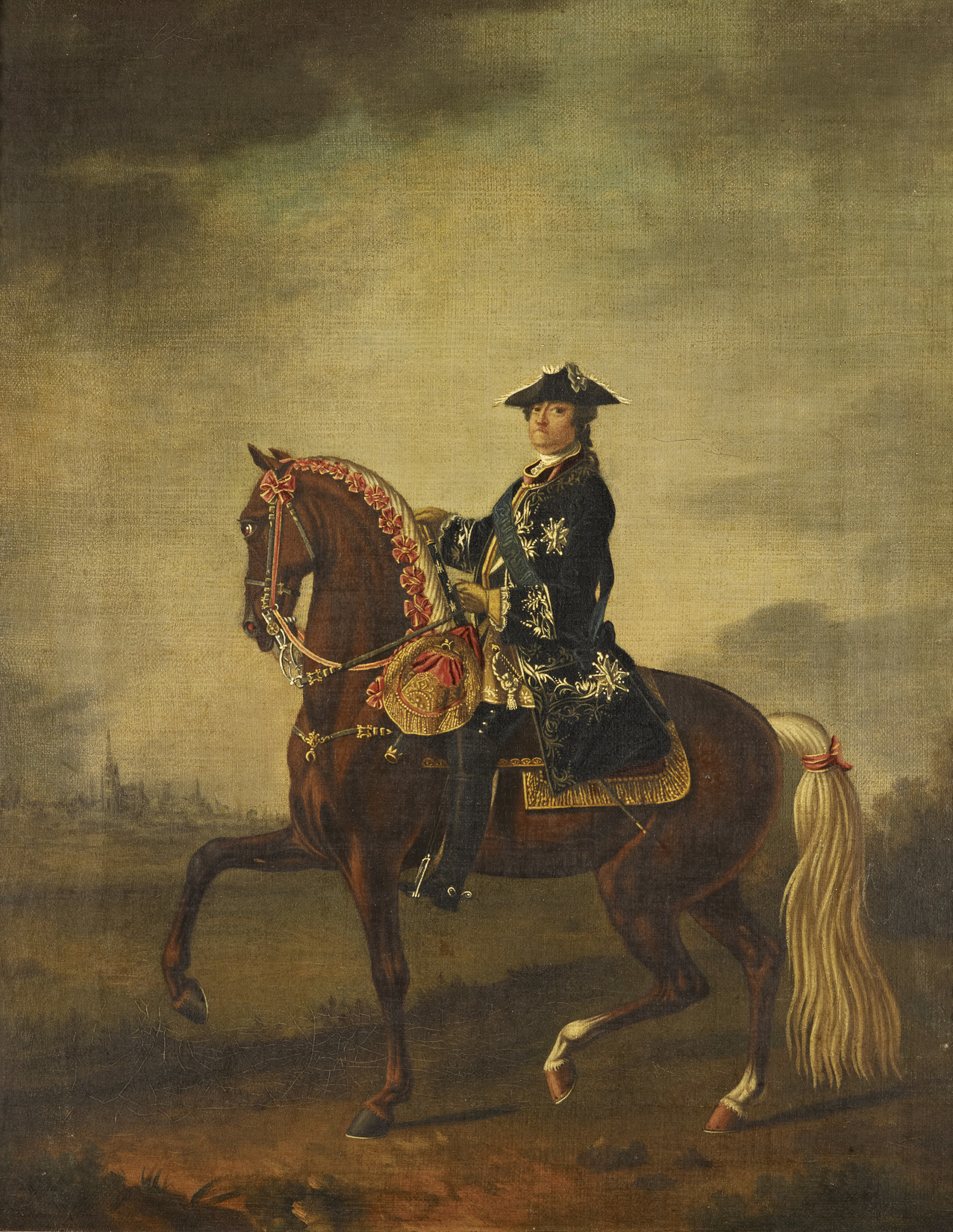
Maurice de Saxe, Maréchal de Saxe

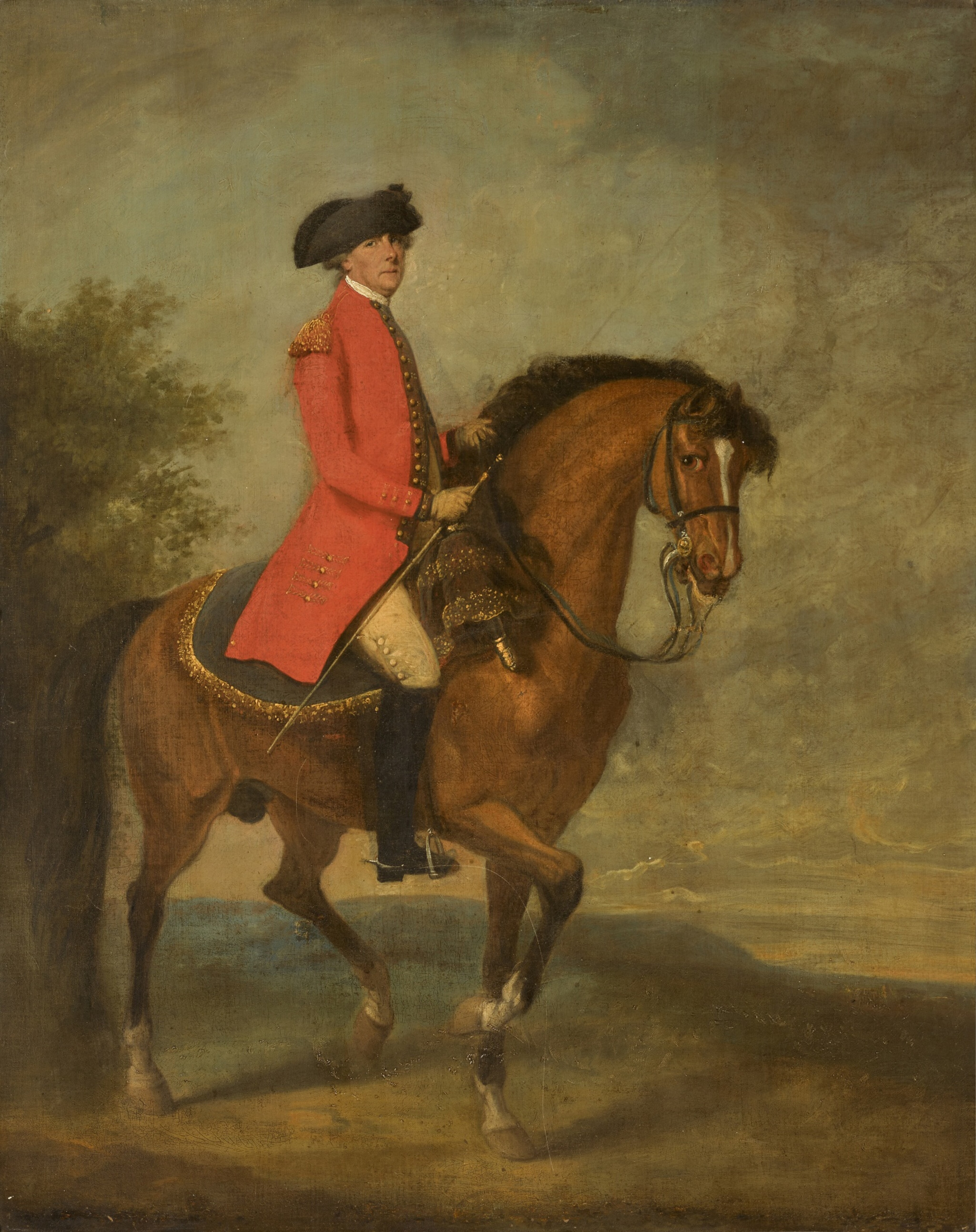
General Sir William Boothby, 4th Baronet

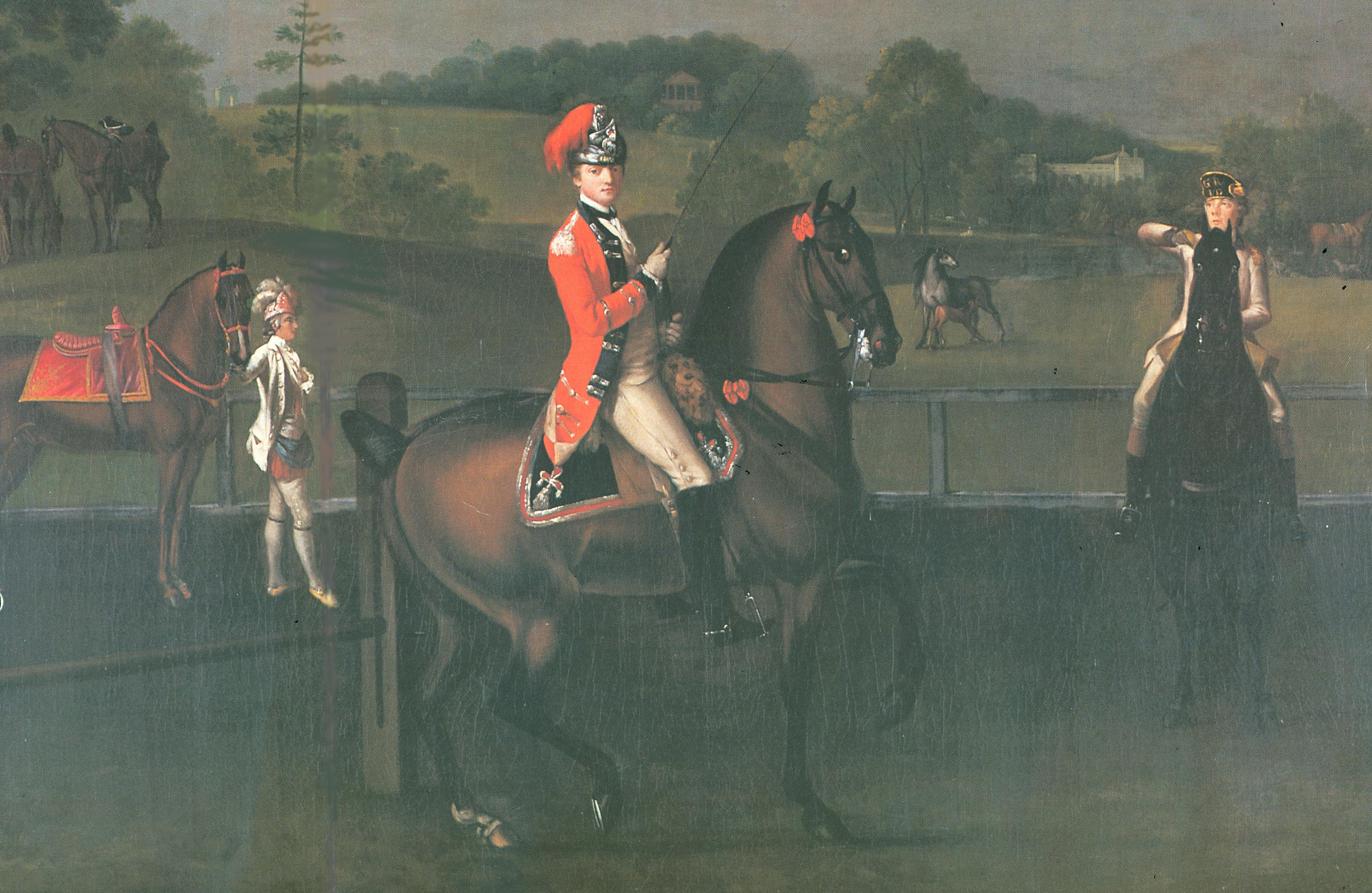
Lieutenant Sir John Floyd, 1st Baronet, 15th Light Dragoons, Kitty Hunter, disguised as a page, and another officer at the riding school of Wilton House

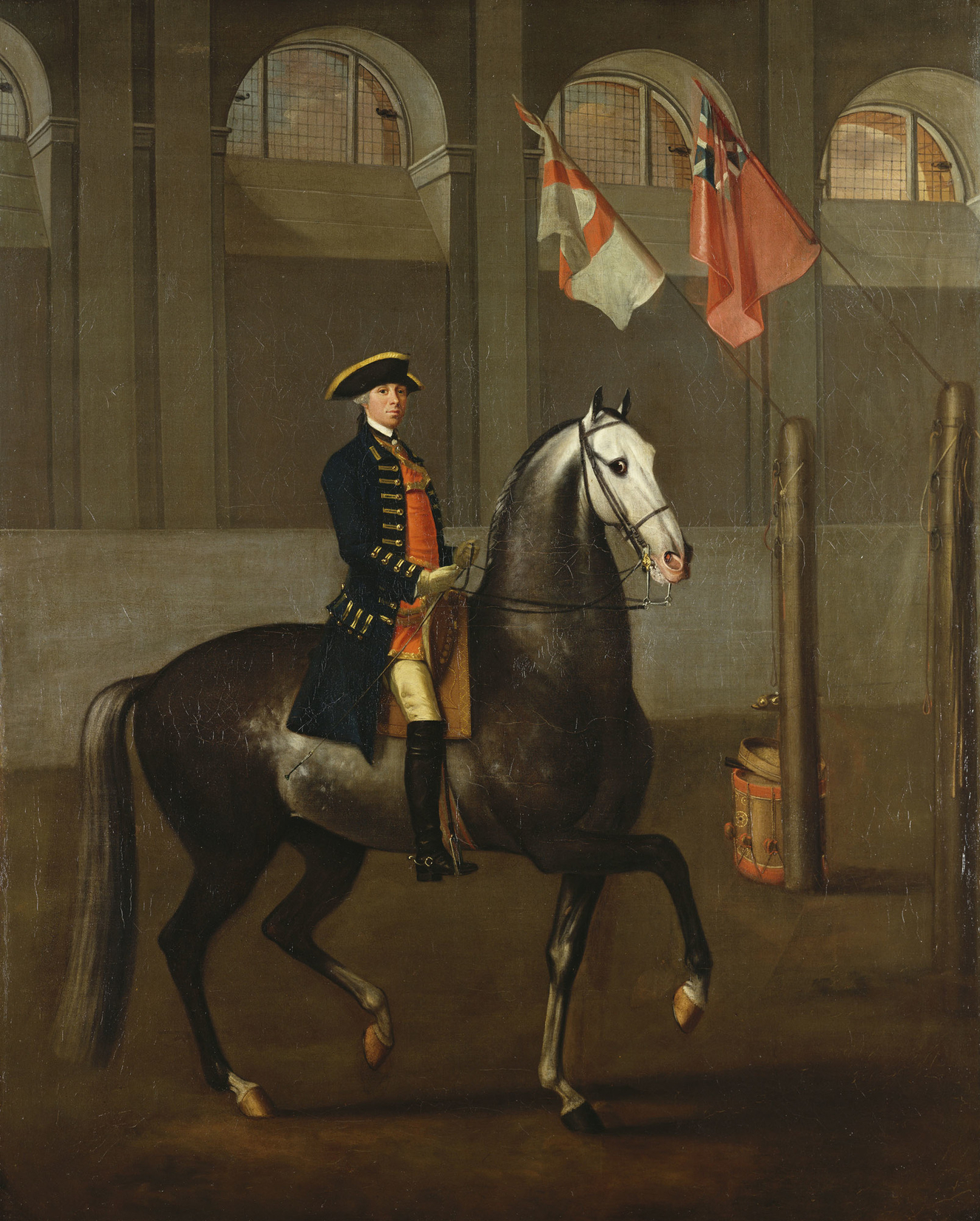
James Montague, Yeoman Rider to King George III, shown in the Riding House at Buckingham House

== Virtual Gallery ==
- Selected paintings by David Morier on Militaria Helvetica
