= Cameron (surname) =

- Language: English, Scots

Origin
- Language: Scottish Gaelic
- Derivation: Gaelic
- Meaning: "Crooked nose"

Other names
- Variant forms: Camarran, Camshron, Chamarran, Chamshron

Cameron is a Scottish surname and thus somewhat common throughout the English-speaking world.

There are several possible origins. One is from a Gaelic-language nickname, derived from cam ("crooked", "bent") and sròn or abhainn ("nose", "river"). Another is from any of the various places called Cameron, especially such places located in Fife, Edinburgh or Lennox, Scotland. The English-language surname can be rendered into Scottish Gaelic as: Camarran (masculine), Chamarran (feminine); or as Camshron (masculine) and Chamshron (feminine).

== List of people with the surname ==
- Alan Cameron (disambiguation), multiple people
- Alexander Cameron (disambiguation), multiple people
- Alfred B. Cameron (1855–1913), American politician from Maryland
- Allan Cameron (disambiguation), multiple people
- Angus Cameron (disambiguation), multiple people
- Archie Cameron (1895–1956), Australian politician
- Arti Cameron (born 1988), Guyanese model
- Averil Cameron (1940–2026), British historian
- Bill Cameron (disambiguation), multiple people
- Cam Cameron (born 1961), American football head coach
- Candace Cameron (born 1976), American actress
- Chantelle Cameron (born 1991), British boxer
- Caressa Cameron (born 1987), American beauty
- Carl Cameron (born 1961), American television journalist
- Charles Cameron (architect) (1745–1812), Scottish architect
- Charlie Cameron (footballer, born 1994), Australian rules footballer
- Christina Cameron (born c. 1947), Canadian writer and architectural historian
- Colin Cameron (disambiguation), multiple people
- Cordelia Cameron, Australian actor-manager
- Cornelia C. Cameron (1911–1994), American geologist
- Daniel Cameron (disambiguation), multiple people
- David Cameron (disambiguation), multiple people
- Daz Cameron (born 1997), American baseball player
- Donald Cameron (disambiguation), multiple people
- Doug Cameron (politician) (born 1951), Australian politician (ALP) and trade unionist
- Dougie Cameron (born 1983), Scottish footballer
- Douglas Colin Cameron (1854–1921), Canadian politician
- Douglas Cameron (disambiguation), multiple people
- Dove Cameron (born 1996), US actress
- Dugald D. Cameron (1827–1867), Wisconsin politician and physician
- Duncan Cameron (British Army officer) (1808–1888), British Army general
- Duncan Cameron (Conservative MLA) (1863–1942), Canadian politician
- Duncan Cameron (fur trader) (1764–1848), Canadian politician
- Duncan Cameron (Liberal MLA) (1865–1948), Canadian politician
- Duncan Cameron (photographer) (1928–1985), Canadian photojournalist
- Duncan Cameron (Scottish inventor) (1825–1901), Scottish businessman
- Duncan Cameron (shinty player), 1994-2011 president of the Camanachd Association
- Duncan D. Cameron, British microbiologist
- Duncan Inglis Cameron (1927–2006), Scottish university administrator
- Earl Cameron (1917–2020), Bermudian actor
- Earl Cameron (broadcaster) (1915–2005), Canadian broadcaster
- Elizabeth Cameron (editor) (1851–1929), Canadian editor
- Elsie Cameron (died 1924), British murder victim
- Elspeth Cameron (1943–2025), Canadian writer
- Eoin Cameron (1951–2016), Western Australian radio personality
- Eric Cameron (1935–2026), Canadian artist
- Ewan Cameron (1922–1991), Scottish physician
- Ewen Cameron (disambiguation), multiple people
- Flynn Cameron (born 2000), New Zealand basketball player
- Geoff Cameron (born 1985), American footballer
- Hector Charles Cameron (1878–1958), British paediatrician
- Hector Clare Cameron (1843–1928), Scottish surgeon
- Ian Cameron (disambiguation), multiple people
- Jake W. Cameron (1913–1999), American politician, former mayor of Bossier City, Louisiana
- James Cameron (disambiguation), multiple people
- Jeremy Cameron (born 1993), Australian rules footballer
- Jeremy Cameron (author), British author
- Jock Cameron (1905–1935), South African cricketer
- John Cameron (disambiguation), multiple people
- John Allan Cameron (1938–2006), Canadian folksinger
- Julia Cameron (born 1948), writer
- Julia Margaret Cameron (1815–1879), British photographer
- Kenneth D. Cameron (born 1949), US astronaut
- Kenneth Neill Cameron (1908–1994), British-Canadian literary scholar
- Kirk Cameron (born 1970), US actor
- Kyle Cameron (born 1997), footballer
- Lisa Cameron (economist) (born 1967), Australian economist
- Loren Cameron (1959–2022), American photographer
- Malcolm Cameron (disambiguation), multiple people
- Margaret Cameron (disambiguation), multiple people
- Marjorie Cameron (1922–1995), American actress, artist and occultist
- Mark Cameron (disambiguation), multiple people
- Matt Cameron (born 1962), US hard rock musician
- Matthew Crooks Cameron (1822–1887), Canadian politician
- Maximilian Cameron aka Maxym Kryvonis (died 1648), one of the leaders of Khmelnytsky Uprising
- Mike Cameron (born 1973), US Major League Baseball player
- Noah Cameron (born 1999), American baseball player
- Paul Cameron (born 1939), US psychologist
- Pero Cameron (born 1974), New Zealand professional basketball player
- Peter Cameron (disambiguation), multiple people
- Phil Cameron (born 1972), British entrepreneur, owner of No.1 Traveller and former West End producer
- Rafael Cameron (born 1951), Guyanese-American singer
- Ralph H. Cameron (1863–1953), American Senator from Arizona (1921–1927)
- Reba Cameron (1885–1959), American nurse
- Richard Cameron (disambiguation), multiple people
- Robert Cameron (disambiguation), multiple people
- Rodney Francis Cameron (1952–2025), Australian serial killer
- Ron Cameron (disambiguation), multiple people
- Ronald B. Cameron (1927–2006), American politician
- Rondo Cameron (1925–2001), economic historian
- Roy Cameron (statistician) (1923–2006), Australian public servant and diplomat
- Ross Cameron (born 1965), Australian politician
- Samantha Cameron (born 1971), British businesswoman, wife of politician David
- Scotty Cameron (born 1962), American golf club maker primarily known for manufacturing putters
- Sean Cameron (disambiguation), multiple people
- Silver Donald Cameron (1937–2020), Canadian writer
- Simon Cameron (1799–1889), American politician
- Tassie Cameron, Canadian television writer
- Verney Lovett Cameron (1844–1894), English traveller
- Violet Cameron (1862–1919), English actress and singer
- W. Bruce Cameron (born 1960), American humorous writer
- Winifred Cameron (1918–2016), American astronomer

== Fictional characters ==
- Dr. Angus Cameron, in the BBC television series Dr. Finlay's Casebook
- Dr. Alexander Cameron, in the television series Doctor Finlay
- Dr. Allison Cameron, in the television series House
- Dr. David Cameron, in the television series Queer as Folk
- Davis Cameron (a.k.a Slipstream), a Marvel Comics character
- Heather Cameron (character) (a.k.a Lifeguard), a Marvel Comics character
- Kiera Cameron, in the television series Continuum
- Tracker Cameron, in Degrassi: The Next Generation

== See also ==
- Clan Cameron, Scottish clan of the name
- Cameron (given name), given name and surname
- Cam (name), given name and surname
