= Duncan Cameron =

Duncan Cameron may refer to:

== Politicians ==
- Duncan Cameron (Conservative MLA) (1863–1942), politician in Manitoba, Canada
- Duncan Cameron (fur trader) (c. 1764–1848), Canadian fur trader and political figure in Upper Canada
- Duncan Cameron (Liberal MLA) (1865–1948), politician in Manitoba, Canada

== Others ==
- Duncan Cameron (photographer) (1928–1985), Canadian photojournalist
- Duncan Cameron (Scottish inventor) (1825–1901), owner of The Oban Times newspaper and inventor of the "Waverley" nib pen
- Duncan Cameron (shinty player), administrator and ex-player in the sport of shinty
- Sir Duncan Cameron (British Army officer) (1808–1888), British general and commander in the New Zealand Land Wars
- Duncan Inglis Cameron (1927–2006), founding secretary of Heriot-Watt University, Edinburgh
- Duncan D. Cameron, British microbiologist

== See also ==
- Cameron Duncan (1986–2003), New Zealand writer
