= Alexander Cameron =

Alexander or Alex or Sandy Cameron may refer to:

== Arts and entertainment ==
- Alexander Beauchamp Cameron (1905–1981), Scottish artist
- Alex Cameron (artist) (born 1947), Canadian artist
- Alex Cameron (musician) (born 1988), Australian musician, singer and songwriter

== Business and industry ==
- Alexander Cameron (businessman) (1827–1893), Irish-born businessman and lawyer; founder of the town of Essex, Ontario, Canada
- Alexander Cameron (tramways administrator) (1864–1940), Australian chairman of the Melbourne and Metropolitan Tramways Board
- Alexander Donald Cameron (1873–1957), Scottish trader who founded the Tonga Ma'a Tonga Kautaha (Tonga for Tongans Cooperative)

== Law and politics ==
=== Canada ===
- Alexander Cameron (politician) (1834–1917), physician and political figure in Quebec
- Alexander F. Cameron (1860–1943), merchant, lumberman and political figure in Nova Scotia
- Alexander Cameron Lewis (fl. 1920), Canadian politician
- Alexander W. Cameron (1905–1960), Canadian politician in the Nova Scotia House of Assembly
- Alexander C. Cameron (1907–1996), politician in Saskatchewan, Canada
- Sandy Cameron (1938–2004), Canadian politician

=== Elsewhere ===
- Alexander Campbell Cameron (1812–1869), British Conservative politician
- Alexander Gordon Cameron (1876–1944), British trades unionist and Labour Party politician
- Alexander Cameron (barrister) (1963−2023), English lawyer

== Religion ==
- Alexander Cameron (priest) (1701–1746), Scottish soldier, servant, and Jesuit Priest
- Alexander Cameron (bishop) (1747–1828), Scottish Roman Catholic bishop
- Alex Cameron (bishop) (born 1964), Canadian-born American Anglican bishop

== Others ==
- Alexander Cameron (British Army officer, born 1781) (1781–1850), British Army general
- Alexander Cameron (pioneer) (1810–1881), pastoralist in Australia
- Alexander Thomas Cameron (1882–1947), British-born Canadian biochemist
- Alexander Maurice Cameron (1898–1986), British Army general
- Alex Cameron (academic) (1937–2003), American English professor

== See also ==
- Cameron Alexander (disambiguation)
- Cameron (surname)
