= Hector Cameron =

Hector Cameron may refer to:

- Hector Cameron (politician) (1832–1896), lawyer and political figure in Ontario, Canada
- Hector Cameron (moderator) (1924–1994), Free Church of Scotland minister
- Hector Charles Cameron (1878–1958), British physician and paediatrician
- Hector Clare Cameron (1843–1928), British surgeon
