= Robert Cameron =

Robert, Rob, Bob, or Bobby Cameron may refer to:

== Law and politics ==
- Robert Cameron (British politician) (1825–1913), Liberal Member of Parliament for Houghton-le-Spring, 1895–1913
- Robert Cameron (New South Wales politician) (1890–1970), New South Wales politician
- Robert Parke Cameron (1920–2012), Canadian ambassador to Romania
- Bob Cameron (Victorian politician) (born 1963), Australian state politician

== Sports ==
=== Association football (soccer) ===
- Robert Cameron (Lincoln City footballer) (fl. 1892–1893), Scottish footballer
- Robert Cameron (Queen's Park footballer) (fl. 1909–1911), Scottish footballer
- Bobby Cameron (footballer, born 1932) (1932–2022), Scottish footballer with QPR
- Bobby Cameron (goalkeeper) (fl. 1970s), Scottish footballer for Queen's Park

=== Other sports ===
- Bob Cameron (Australian footballer) (1877–1960), Australian rules footballer
- Bob Cameron (racing driver) (1927–1960), American stock car driver, NASCAR pioneer
- Robert Cameron (cricketer) (1938–2012), Australian cricketer
- Bob Cameron (Canadian football) (born 1954), Canadian Football League punter
- Rob Cameron (fl. 1960s–1970s), Australian rugby player

== Others ==
- Bobby Cameron (born 1953), American actress later known as Cameron
- Robert Alexander Cameron (1828–1894), American soldier during the American Civil War
- Robert Macfarlane Cameron (1860–1920), Scottish architect
- Robert Horton Cameron (1908–1989), American mathematician
- Robert Cameron (photographer) (1911–2009), American photographer
- Robert Curry Cameron (1925–1972), American astronomer
- Robert Shaw Cameron (born 1976), British actor and director

== See also ==
- Cameron (surname)
