= Clephane =

Clephane is a surname. Notable people with the surname include:

- Elizabeth C. Clephane (1830–1869), Scottish hymn writer
- James O. Clephane (1842–1910), American court reporter and venture capitalist
- James Clephane-Cameron (1985-), English poet
- John Clephane (died 1758), Scottish physician
- Neil Clephane-Cameron (1960-), English historian

== See also ==
- Clephane-Cameron, a surname
