= Clephane-Cameron =

Clephane-Cameron is a surname. Notable people with the surname include:

- Neil Clephane-Cameron (born 1960), historian of the Battle of Hastings
- James Clephane-Cameron (born 1985), English poet

== See also ==
- Clephane
- Cameron (surname)
