= Doug Cameron =

Doug Cameron may refer to:

- Doug Cameron (musician), Canadian musician
- Doug Cameron (politician) (born 1951), Australian politician and trade unionist
- Doug Cameron (rugby league), former 1950s halfback for the Eastern Suburbs football club
- Doug Cameron (engineer), American engineer, inventor, and investor

== See also ==
- Douglas Cameron (disambiguation)
