= James Cameron (disambiguation) =

James Cameron (born 1954) is a Canadian film director.

James or Jim Cameron may also refer to:

== People ==
=== Sportspeople ===
- James Cameron (American football) (1938–1995), American college football coach
- James Cameron (footballer) (1868–1934), Scottish footballer
- James Cameron (soccer) (born 2005), Canadian soccer player
- James Cameron (South African cricketer) (born 1979), former South African cricketer
- James Cameron (Zimbabwean cricketer) (born 1986), Zimbabwean cricketer
- James Cameron (rugby union) (born 2005), New Zealand rugby union player
- Jamie Cameron (born 1970), New Zealand rugby union player
- Jim Cameron (Australian footballer) (1881–1941), Australian rules footballer
- Jim Cameron (Scottish footballer) (born 1946), Scottish footballer
- Jim Cameron (water polo), former water polo representative from New Zealand
- Jimmy Cameron (1923–1994), Jamaican cricketer
- James Cameron-Dow (born 1990), South African cricketer

=== Political figures ===
- James Cameron (Victorian politician) (1846–1922), Australian politician
- Jim Cameron (politician) (1930–2002), Australian politician
- J. Donald Cameron (1833–1918), American politician
- James Duke Cameron (1925–2003), justice of the Supreme Court of Arizona

=== Medical practitioners ===
- Sir James Cameron (physician) (1900–1969), Scottish physician
- James Roderick Johnston Cameron (1902–1997), Scottish surgeon

=== Other ===
- James Cameron (activist) (1914–2006), American civil-rights activist
- James Cameron (journalist) (1911–1985), British journalist
- James Cameron (missionary) (1799–1875), Scottish artisan missionary
- James Cameron (pathologist) (1930–2003), British forensic pathologist
- James Cameron (Union colonel) (1800–1861), American Union Army colonel
- James R. Cameron (born 1929), American historian and educator
- James W. Cameron (1913–2010), American professor and citrus breeder
- James Clephane-Cameron (born 1985), British poet

== Other uses ==
- Jim Cameron, a fictional character from the 1939 American film Secret Service of the Air
- SS James C. Cameron, a U.S. WWII Liberty ship, see List of Liberty ships (G–Je)

== See also ==
- Cameron James (born 1998), British soccer player
