= Duncan Inglis =

Duncan Inglis may refer to:

- Duncan James, Duncan Matthew James Inglis, British singer in the band Blue
- Duncan Inglis Cameron of Heriot-Watt University, Edinburgh
