= Cameron Alexander =

Cameron Alexander may refer to:

- Cameron M. Alexander (1932–2018), American Baptist church and community leader
- Cameron Alexander, a character in American History X
- Cameron Alexander (alpine skier) (born 1997), Canadian alpine skier

== See also ==
- Alexander Cameron (disambiguation)
- Alexander (surname)
