= Margaret Cameron =

Margaret Cameron may refer to:

- Margaret Cameron (author) (1867–1947), American author
- Margaret Cameron (jurist), Canadian jurist
- Margaret Cameron (librarian) (1937–2023), Australian librarian, administrator and ornithologist
- Margaret Cameron (philosopher), Canadian philosopher in Australia
- Julia Margaret Cameron (1815–1879), British photographer

== See also ==
- Kathleen Lindsay (1903–1973), English author of romance novels who wrote under this name
