= Tonga Ma'a Tonga Kautaha =

Copra export group in Tonga

Tonga Ma'a Tonga Kautaha (Tonga for Tongans Cooperative) was formed in Tonga in 1909 to export copra on behalf of its members, prior to which such exports had been controlled by a cartel of European traders who profited greatly from the trade but paid little to Tongan copra growers.

The cooperative was the idea of Alexander Donald Cameron, a trader from a Scottish family, who with the support of a noble titleholder, Vaea of Hauma, organised meetings in villages around Tongatapu, the main island in the Kingdom of Tonga, to explain its concept and enlist members. Cameron had its constitution drawn up by fellow expatriate Robert Hanslip, based on that of Tonga's Free Church, which favoured Tongan autonomy and was the official church in Tonga of which most Tongan growers were members rather than of the Wesleyan Church favoured by the majority of European expatriates.

Formed as a commission agency that passed on to its members the exact overseas sale price less duty, freight and a modest commission that went to Cameron as its president, the cooperative was also viewed as a vehicle for Tongan aspirations and a means of acquiring business skills of non-indigenous residents.

The cooperative opened in May 1909 with 1,300 members and before the end of the year had 3,280 members from all three main islands in the kingdom - Tongatapu, Vava’u and Ha’apai - including many of Tonga's most influential nobles and chiefs, comprising 60 per cent of the kingdom's taxpayers, or landowners in terms of the Constitution, out of a population at that time of 22,000.

As the cooperative prospered it began importing consumables for sale to its members, breaking a monopoly previously held by European traders who had pursued a two-tier policy of one price for their fellow expatriates and double that for Tongans.

The cooperative's success drew the ire of the islands' European traders, who through the support of the local British Agent caused it to be investigated, the Auditor General being given access to its books (with Cameron's blessing) and presenting a report of his findings to its members that led to its closure by Tonga's Premier on grounds of financial irregularities by Cameron, for which Cameron was subsequently charged. On appeal, Cameron was acquitted of any wrongdoing. He later attempted to reform the collective under the name Tonga Ma'a Tonga Company Limited with himself as general manager and now paid a salary rather than a commission, but it was not successful and ceased business in about 1916.

The circumstances of the investigation, its outcome and in particular the heavy-handedness of William Telfer Campbell, the British Agent, in his dealings with the ruling monarch, King George Tupou II, led to a redefining of the role of that office in relation to advice given to the monarch, strengthening the latter's authority and the nation's autonomy.
