= Ewen Cameron =

Ewen Cameron may refer to:

== People in Scottish Clan Cameron ==
- Ewen MacAllan Cameron, 10th Chief, see Chiefs of Clan Cameron
- Ewen Mor Cameron of Lochiel (died 1547), 13th Chief
- Ewen 'Beag' Cameron of Lochiel, 14th Chief, see Chiefs of Clan Cameron
- Sir Ewen Cameron of Lochiel (1629–1719), 17th Chief

== Politicians ==
- Ewen Hugh Cameron (1831–1915), member for Evelyn in the Victorian Legislative Assembly from 1874 to 1914
- Ewen Cameron (Victorian politician) (1860–1906), member for Portland (1900–1904) and Glenelg (1904–1906) in the Victorian Legislative Assembly
- Ewen Paul Cameron (1891–1964), member for East Yarra Province in the Victorian Legislative Council 1948–1964 and health minister
- Ewen Cameron (Australian politician) (born 1930), former Australian federal MP, member for Indi 1977–1993

== Other people ==
- Sir Ewen Cameron, 1st Baronet (1740–1828), of Cameron baronets, of Fassiefern
- Ewen Cameron (banker) (1841–1908), Scots-born Chairman of the Hong Kong and Shanghai Banking Corporation
- Ewen Cameron, Baron Cameron of Dillington (born 1949), member of the House of Lords
- Ewen Cameron (cricketer) (1921–1997), New Zealand cricketer
- Ewen Cameron (presenter) (born 1973), Scottish radio DJ and television presenter
- Ewen Cameron (soldier) (1811–1843), Scots-born Texan Army officer
- Donald Cameron (bishop) (Ewen Donald Cameron, born 1926), Anglican prelate in Australia
- Ewen Wallace Cameron (1816–1876), Australian businessman

== See also ==
- Donald Ewen Cameron (1901–1967), Scottish-born psychiatrist
- Ewan Cameron (1922–1991), Scottish physician
- Ewan Cameron (fl. 2000s), Scottish television critic for the Evening Express
- Ewan Cameron (fl. 2000s), Scottish architect and designer of Capel Manor, Kent
