= Alexander Cameron (businessman) =

Canadian businessman (1827–1893)

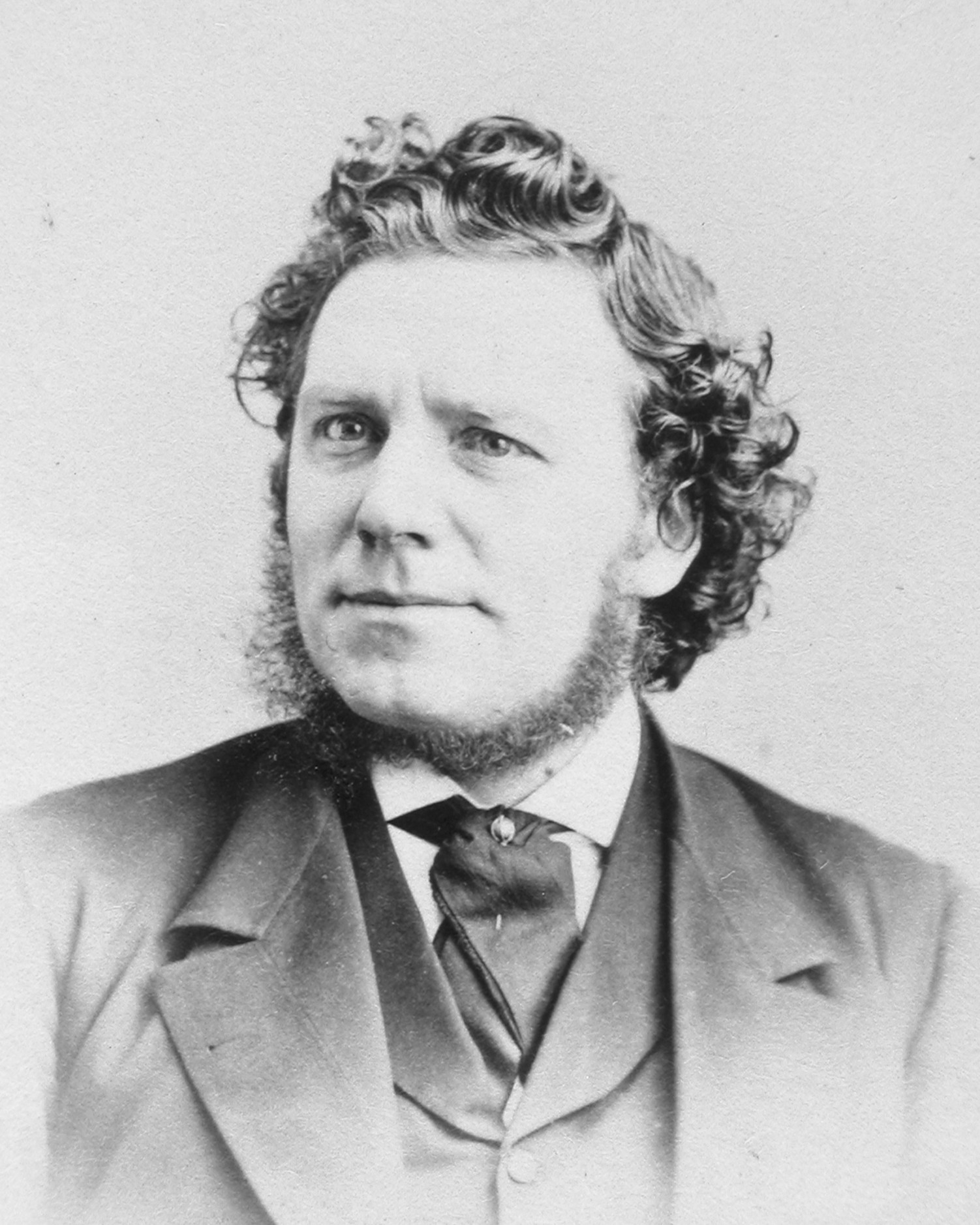
- Born: 22 June 1827; Ireland
- Died: 15 May 1893 (aged 65); Toronto, Ontario
- Spouse(s): Calcina Medora Buell (m. 1853; died 1875) Catharine Lyon (m. 1878)

Alexander Cameron (22 June 1827 – 15 May 1893), known as the "Earl of Essex", was an Irish-born Canadian businessperson, lawyer, and land speculator who founded the town of Essex and owned much of the land around Windsor, Ontario, and Essex County in the late 19th century.

The son of Allan Cameron, a British soldier, he came to Amherstburg, Upper Canada with his father and grew up there. Cameron was educated at Upper Canada College, articled in law in Toronto and was called to the bar in 1853, setting up practice in Toronto and Windsor.

Early in his life Cameron sought a career in politics with the Reform Party, but after a bitter election and accusation of corruption in 1854, Cameron's interest in politics came to an end. Cameron then bought a great deal of land in Essex County and was forced to borrow money from his father-in-law to pay the mortgage when the land value did not increase. Cameron also leased Talbot road in Essex County after the municipality sought to lease main roads to toll companies. In the 1870s Cameron's business dealings finally became profitable. He bought land in Essex County that was adjacent to railways and becoming increasingly valuable.

In the 1880s Cameron developed land in Windsor, Ontario along with John Curry; as well as practising law with Francis Cleary and R. F. Sutherland.

By the end of his life, Cameron had amassed assets worth $1.5 million.

On 2 November 1853, Cameron married Calcina Medora "Dora" Buell (1828–1875), the daughter of Andrew Norton Buell (1798–1880) and first cousin of William Buell Richards and Albert Norton Richards. Alex and Dora had four children: Francis Buell (1854–1855), Mary Adeline (1856–1916; married George Torrance), Katherine Medora (1859–1900; married John Cartwright), and Alfred Buell (1862–1938). After Dora's death in 1875, Cameron remarried on 7 November 1878 to Catharine Lyon (1841–1915), the widow of Eber Brock Ward.
