= Peter Cameron =

Peter Cameron may refer to:

- Peter Cameron (entomologist) (1847–1912), English entomologist who specialised in Hymenoptera
- Peter Cameron (mathematician) (born 1947), Australian mathematician, joint winner of the 2003 Euler Medal
- Peter Cameron (minister) (born 1945), Scottish-born Church of Scotland minister convicted of heresy by the Presbyterian Church of Australia
- Peter Cameron (novelist) (born 1959), American novelist and short-story writer
- Peter Cameron (umpire) (born 1951), former umpire in Australian football
- Peter Gow Cameron, Canadian politician in Ontario
- Peter Cameron, writer and director of The Redemption (2024), starring Shantae Barnes-Cowan

== See also ==
- Peter Cameron Scott (1867–1896), Scottish-American missionary
