= Mark Cameron =

Mark Cameron may refer to:

- Mark Cameron (weightlifter) (born 1952), American weightlifter
- Mark Cameron (cricketer) (born 1981), Australian cricketer
- Mark Cameron (politician), New Zealand politician
- Mark Cameron (paramedic) (born 1969), Canadian paramedic
