= Alan Cameron =

Alan Cameron may refer to:

- Sir Alan Cameron of Erracht (1753–1828), British army general
- Alan Cameron (classicist) (1938–2017), British classicist
- Alan Cameron (legal scholar), New Zealand legal scholar
- Alan Cameron (rugby union) (1929–2010), Australian rugby union footballer
- Pat Cameron (Alan John Patrick Cameron, 1895–1982), Canadian Member of Parliament
- Al Cameron (Alan Richard Cameron, born 1955), ice hockey player

== See also ==
- Allan Cameron (disambiguation)
