= Cornelia C. Cameron =

American geologist (1911–1994)

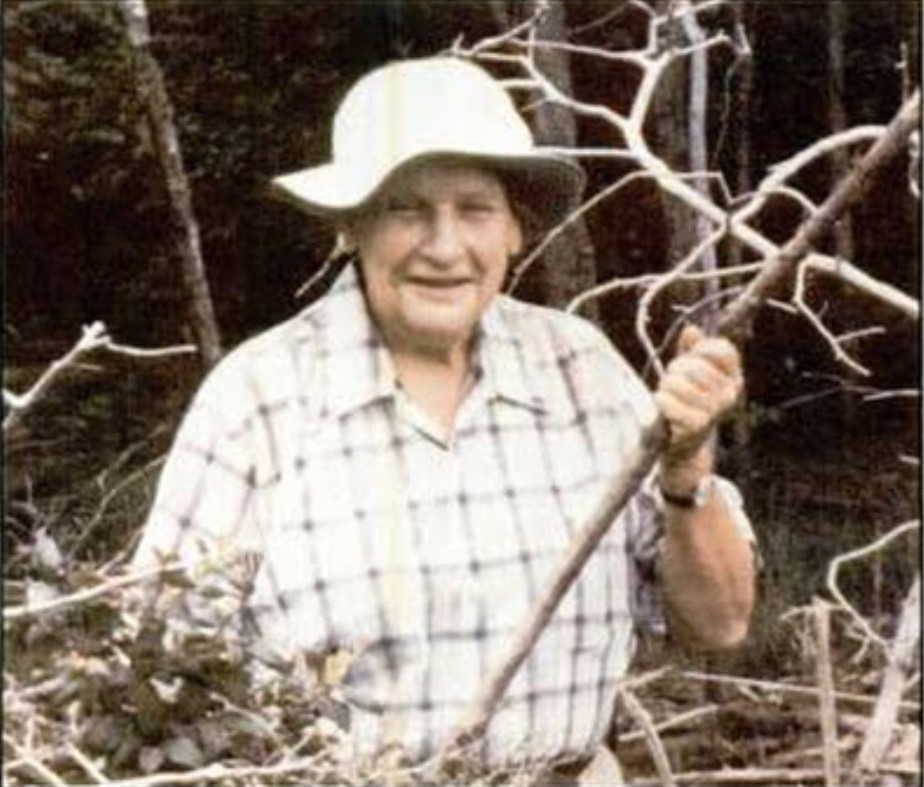
- Born: Cornelia Clermont Cameron; 1911; Iowa City, Iowa, U.S.A.
- Died: 5 August 1994 (aged 83); Winchester, Virginia
- Citizenship: United States of America
- Education: University of Iowa
- Awards: Meritorious Service Award 1986 from USGS and Interior Distinguished Alumni Award 1987 from the University of Iowa
- Scientific career
- Fields: Geology, Botany

Cornelia Clermont Cameron (1911 – August 5, 1994) was an American geologist who researched peat as a soil additive and energy source.

Cameron studied at the University of Iowa, where she earned a doctorate in geology and botany. Her interest in geology and her fieldwork took her to over 30 countries. In 1945, she wrote The Earth in Human Affairs, which relates geology with society, and many other papers on the subject. While starting her career in USGS, she worked in the Military Geology Branch.

Best known for her advances regarding glacier deposits, Cameron was able to predict the location of peat deposits. Such predictions are useful in the search for water sources prior to developing agricultural lands. As a specialist in peat, she became a member of the Branch of Eastern Mineral Resources since 1969. Before Cameron joined the United States Geological Survey, she was a geology professor at Stephens College in Missouri, teaching earth science courses. During her time at the United States Geological Survey, Cameron received two awards. In 1977, she received the USGS' Meritorious Service Award. This award is the second-highest award and is given to employees who make an important contribution to science or have a notable career, among other criteria. In 1986, she revived the USGS' Distinguished Service Award. This award is the highest award that can be received in the department.

Cameron argued for the inclusion of geology in general science courses for non-science majors at universities. She stated that learning about geology provides students with the opportunity to think about themselves in relation to their physical environments, and develop a connection with the elements of nature that they encounter every day. General geology also teaches students skills such as critical thinking and looking for relationships between all things.

Cameron created a rough curriculum outline with several objectives that could be divided into units. In the journal article, The Place of Geology In General Education (1944), Cameron compares geology to aviation. She states that students who are studying both geology and aviation have a better understanding because the concepts and maps associated with these areas of study greatly relate to each other.

Cornelia Cameron created sketch maps of peat deposits, maps drawn from observations of landscapes without direct measurements. After joining the geological survey in 1951, Cameron concentrated mainly in the military aspects of geology. For the military, Cameron analyzed strategic sites that included analysis of a variety of metrics, including groundwater, suitability for building roads, and suitability for building airports.

From 1972 through 1985, she served as vice-chairman of the U.S Committee of the International Peat Society. During this time, she was also a consultant for the Campobello international park commission, which would oversee the Roosevelt Campobello International Park.

In the decades leading up to her death, Cameron studied peat as a soil additive and energy source. Her work helped identify more than 70 million tons of peat in the United States. She published dozens of papers on this subject and was senior author on a text talking about peat resources in Maine. Alongside the 66 total papers Cameron had published, she was also a senior author for an army field manual that relates to terrain intelligence.

== Early life ==
Cameron was the daughter of two scientists. Her mother, Harriet Clearman Cameron, had a master's in geology and a PhD in botany. Her father was a professor of Natural Sciences. Cameron's father died in 1918 when she was only seven years old. Cornelia and her brother William were raised on a farm outside of Iowa City. Her education consisted of a Bachelor of Arts degree which she earned in 1933, as well as a Master's of science degree which she earned in 1935. Both degrees were obtained from the State University of Iowa, which has been renamed as the University of Iowa. Later, she went back to school and earned her PhD in Geology at the State University of Iowa in 1940. Her parents, especially her mother, had a profound impact on her profession. Cameron's mother continued to do fieldwork with her until she was 103 years old. Cameron's mother often went with her daughter overseas to help with fieldwork. Camerons field work consisted of travels to over thirty countries between the years 1953 and 1964, including but not limited to Japan, Korea, Taiwan, and Nigeria. On the expeditions she was working as an engineering geology consultant, with the United Nations. Her mother earned her master's degree in geology in 1904 and earned her PhD in botany.

== Her papers ==
One of Cameron's papers, "Relationship between Peat Geochemistry and Depositional Environments, Cranberry Island, Maine", focused on a place called The Heath on Great Cranberry Island, Maine. She considered The Heath a great place to study the "lateral and vertical relationships between radically different peat types within" one square kilometer. There were two purposes for this research: to find out to "what extent depositional environments, peat-producing botanical communities, and chemical characteristics of peat can be correlated within a small bog/marsh," and to show how peat characteristics can differ over short distances. Cameron’s team studied various Peat and different climates all over the US. Some of the examples are: (1) a glaciated terrain in cold-temperate Maine and Minnesota (2) an island in a temperate maritime climate in the Atlantic Ocean off the coast of Maine USA, where the tide rises fast and changes the peat completely (3) swamps along warmer climates of the US and Gulf Coastal Plains (4) the coast of Sarawak, Malaysia and river of Batang Hari. She and her research team took samples of the peat and had them analyzed in a laboratory. The bogs found in most places except for the Atlantic and Gulf Coastal plains, are domed bogs which meant that it kept rising above the soil around it. They concluded that the "geometry of the depositional basin, the level of the water table, the proximity to marine waters, and the influx of inorganic material into the swamp/bog" all affected the plants and "inorganic content" of The Heath.

Cameron authored "The geology of selected peat-forming environments in temperate and tropical latitudes", a study for the International Journal of Coal Geology focused on her field observations. In this study, she noticed that trace elements in peat deposits are affected by the environment they are in when she found different levels of concentration and different elements in different environments. Cameron determined that these trace elements identify the type bedrock underneath the peat and how the peat transported from the source to the peat swamp. She concludes that the study of modern peat deposits will help with the study of ancient coal beds. This idea was corroborated by a paper by D.V Punwani called "Peat as an Energy Alternative", which stated that through the movement of Earth's crust, peat gets trapped, loses access to air, and gets put under extreme pressures, beginning the coalification process; this paper mentioned that peat is also referred to as young coal. Cornelia Cameron's paper in the Coal Geology is solidified.

== Peat for energy ==
Peat is partially decayed organic matter, which is composed mostly of plant material. It is commonly found in wetland environments, such as bogs and swamps. This material is formed due to the high acidity of wetlands, which prevents the organic material from fully decaying and allows the organic material to accumulate over time. For a long time, peat has been used as an alternative heat and energy resource, and it can also be mixed with soil to modify its acidity and moisture retention, in order to support the growth of certain plants.

Since World War II, there was a growing interest in the use of peat in the production of energy, particularly in many European countries who would undertake in large development programs of the harvesting and distribution of peat fuel. However, the fuel source isn't commercially used in very many countries, especially during periods where cheap oil is available in large supply. Also, since peat is composed of 90% water, more energy is used to evaporate the water in order to burn the peat and subsequently extract the energy, which will make it less efficient than fossil fuels.

The use of peat over the years has been fluctuating due to cheaper alternatives for energy consumption and environmental concerns. The use of peat as an energy source was a cheaper option compared to the alternatives of oil, gas and coal. However, in the 1960s, the price of cheap oil and coal had an effect on peat usage across the world, causing the usage of peat to fall while the other alternatives began to rise.

Peat as an energy source was largely used in Ireland, England, the Netherlands, Germany, Sweden, Poland, Finland, and the USSR. In 1971, Finland passed the first national energy peat development program focusing on protecting peat lands as well as expanding on the existing peatland to make a total of 10 million cubic meters of peat land. This was then extended to 20 million cubic meters after the price of oil began to increase during and after the war with the Middle East. Peat as an energy source across the world continued to be beaten by cheaper alternatives, resulting in the drainage of many peat lands. When draining peatland, the land can then be used to make forests or for agricultural purposes.

In Canada, most of the drained peatland was converted to agricultural land. During the Mega Rice land conversion of Central Kalimantan in 1966, around one million hectares of peat land were converted for rice production and cultivation. Besides using other energy sources due to the cheaper cost, peat has also been seen as an environmental concern due to the CO_{2} released during combustion, making it a fossil fuel. However, the Finnish Ministry stated in “The Role of Peat in Finnish Greenhouse Gas Balances” that peat should be considered a biomass fuel instead of a fossil fuel. Peat will continue to be a fossil fuel till it is officially added to the list of renewable energy sources.

There was a decline in the use of peat in the twentieth century since at this time, the use of oil and gas for cooking and fuel dominated. However, since electricity was in such high demand, electric power plants fueled by peat were developed to keep up with this demand. Peat most often was used in the 60–200 MW power plants, but more recently has been used in the range of 20–1000 kW. Aside from being a fuel source, peat can also be used as an insulator in buildings, since it is a poor heat conductor.

The feasibility of using peat as an energy source in different areas comes down to economic factors. For instance, the local conditions of different areas would need to be surveyed, such as the availability of other energy sources, cost of peat, transportation costs and distances, and climate conditions. In the tropics and more developing countries, there is minimal technology for peat extraction. In developed countries, on the contrary, peat extraction has been practiced for centuries. As a result, less developed regions must rely on the information and technology that developed countries have for peat extraction.

When looking at peat as an energy source, multiple factors contribute to its usability. Peat has varying characteristics at different stages of its decomposition. Weakly decomposed peat cannot combust effectively. Moderately to well-decomposed peat is more suitable for combustion, and this is the stage of peat that is used for fuel/energy.

The chemistry of peat also determines whether it makes a good energy source. This includes the carbon and hydrogen content in the peat, as well as the ash content. Peat is composed of the organic materials carbon and hydrogen, and the content of these elements in peat is what makes it suitable for combustion and therefore an energy source.

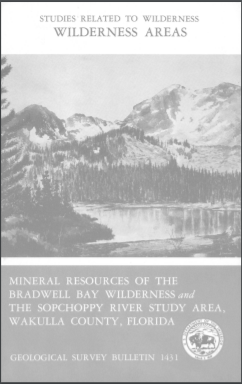
Mineral Resources of the Bradwell Bay Wilderness, published in 2017, many decades after her death

Peat is also composed of inorganic materials, and these materials vary in quality and quantity. The quality and quantity of these inorganic materials contribute to the ash content, which is a factor that affects the usefulness of peat as fuel. Peat is usually mixed with mineral soil to increase the moisture-retaining capacity for sands. Peat with large mineral soil content has a higher ash content/value. Peat can be classified as "good quality peat" or "usable for fuel". Peat with ash values from 1–7 % is classified as good quality peat, whereas peats with ash values up to 14% are usable for fuel. SiO_{2} and Al_{2}O_{3} in peat raise the melting point of the ash and raises the total ash content. CaO and Fe_{2}O_{3} lower the melting points and decreases the total ash content. Depending on the region the peat is from, Sulphur contents of peat are typically low. Therefore, most peat has a similar Sulphur content to oil (contains no more than 0.3–0.4% of Sulphur). Therefore, peat is acceptable and comparable to oil as fuel.

Peat energy is utilized as an oil alternative when it comes to generating electricity. Countries such as Russia, Ireland, and Finland have been using peat as power generation for decades. And because it contains 90% water, its moisture can be reduced into a size that can be commercially harvested by air drying technique. Russia, for instance, harvests peat that only contains 35% to 55% moisture in order for it to be used for generating electricity.

According to the Institute of Gas Technology (IGT), U.S. Department of Energy (DOE), and Minnesota Gas Company (Minnegasco), peat has a capability to create high amounts of hydrocarbon gases and contains a lower carbon content.

In the context of environmental impacts, Peatlands are highly habitable for species to live in them. Its productivity in terms of life can be used to produce energy farms, wildlife habitats, lakes, and ponds. In fact, peatlands are prolific for agricultural purposes.

== Publications ==
Publications include:

Year	Publication
1970	Peat deposits of northeastern Pennsylvania
1970	Peat deposits of southeastern New York
1972	A preliminary study of peat resources in eastern Maine
1974	Some peat deposits in Washington and southeastern Aroostook counties, Maine
1975	Some peat deposits in Washington and southeastern Aroostook Counties, Maine
1976	Mineral resources of the Bradwell Bay Wilderness and the Sopchoppy River Study Area, Wakulla County, Florida, with sections on phosphate and sand
1977	Some Peat Bogs in Washington County, Maine: Their Formation and Trace-Element Content
1978	Mineral resources of the Cranberry Wilderness Study Area, Pocahontas and Webster counties, West Virginia
1978	Some peat deposits in northern Hancock County, Maine
1979	Mineral resources evaluation of the Round Lake Wilderness Study Area, Price and Vilas counties, Wisconsin
1979	Some peat deposits in Penobscot County, Maine
1979	Mineral resources of the Wambaw Swamp Wilderness Study Area, Charleston County, South Carolina
1980	Mineral resources of the Dolly Sods Wilderness area, Grant, Randolph, and Tucker counties, West Virginia, with sections on peat resources and oil and gas potential
1980	Some peat deposits in northern Penobscot, eastern Piscataquis, and eastern Aroostook counties, Maine
1980	Peat resources of the Great Heath, Washington County, Maine
1980	First Union Corporation, a bank holding company : a tradition of leadership
1981	Mineral resources of the Cranberry Wilderness study area, Webster and Pocahontas counties, West Virginia, with sections on peat resources, oil and gas potential, and geochemical survey
1981	Sketch maps showing areal extent, thickness, and amount of commercial-quality peat in deposits in and near Piscataquis and Somerset counties and northeastern Aroostook County, Maine
1981	Surficial geology and peat resources map of the Houston area, Susitna Valley, Alaska
1981	Surficial geology and peat resources map of the Rogers Creek area, Susitna Valley, Alaska
1981	Mineral-resource evaluation of the Round Lake Wilderness Study Area, Price and Vilas counties, Wisconsin
1981'	Mineral resources of the Rainbow Lake Wilderness Area and Flynn Lake Wilderness Study Area, Bayfield County, Wisconsin
1982	Sketch maps showing areal extent, thickness and amount of commercial-quality peat in deposits of southern and western Maine
1982	Maine Peat-Resource Evaluation Program: 1980 field season. Open File No. 82-8
1982	Sketch maps, sections and laboratory analyses of peat resources in deposits in and near Piscataquis and Somerset counties and northeastern Aroostook County, Maine
1983	Mineral resource potential map of the Hell Hole Bay, Wambaw Swamp, Little Wambaw Swamp, and Wambaw Creek Wildernesses, Berkeley and Charleston counties, South Carolina
1983	VARIATIONS IN MINERAL MATTER CONTENT OF A PEAT DEPOSIT IN MAINE RESTING ON GLACIO-MARINE SEDIMENTS.
1983	Sketch maps, sections and laboratory analyses of peat resources in deposits of southern and western Maine
1983	Surficial geology map of the Great Heath, Washington County, Maine
1983	Peat resources of southern and western Maine. [USA]
1984	Peat resources of Maine; Volume 3, Piscataquis and Somerset Counties
1984	Peat resources of Maine. Volume 1. Aroostook County'
1984	Sketch maps, sections and laboratory analyses of peat resources in deposits of eastern Maine
1984	Peat resources of Maine. Volume 4. Southern and western Maine
1984	Peat resources of Maine; Volume 2, Penobscot County
1984	An expert system for mineral resources assessment in the Sherbrooke-Lewiston 1 degree x 2 degrees quadrangles, Maine, New Hampshire and Vermont
1984	Geologic map of the Big Gum Swamp and Natural Area Roadless Areas, Osceola National Forest, Columbia and Baker counties, Florida
1984	Peat resources of Maine; Volume 5, Washington County
1984	Geologic map of the Hell Hole Bay, Wambaw Swamp, Little Wambaw Swamp, and Wambaw Creek Wildernesses, Berkeley and Charleston counties, South Carolina
1984	BRADWELL BAY WILDERNESS AND THE SOPCHOPPY RIVER WILDERNESS STUDY AREA, FLORIDA.
1984	Peat resources and preliminary evaluation of uranium resources in Holocene organic deposits as of 1984, Lewiston and Sherbrooke 1 degree x 2 degree sheets, northern New England
1986	Mineral resource assessment map of the Big Gum Swamp Roadless Area, Columbia and Baker counties, Florida
1986	Geology and mineral-resource potential of Seven Roadless Areas in the Apalachicola National Forest, Liberty County, Florida
1986	Some controls on trace-element concentrations, especially uranium, in selected peat deposits in Vermont and New Hampshire
1987	Geology and mineral resources potential of the Billies Bay, Alexander Springs, Little Lake George, and Juniper Prairie Wildernesses, and the Baptist Lake Roadless area, Lake, Marion, and Putnam counties, Florida
1987	Geology and mineral resources potential of the Impassable Bay Roadless Area, Columbia County, Florida
1987	Relationship between peat geochemistry and depositional environments, Cranberry Island, Maine
1988	Preliminary report of the trace element geochemistry of an Indonesian peat deposit
1989	Peat and its occurrence as a resource in Maine
1989	Wetland and peat resource map of the Sandown 7.5-minute quadrangle, New Hampshire
1989	Wetland and peat resource map of the Pinardville 7.5-minute Quadrangle, New Hampshire
1989	Wetland and peat resource map of the South Merrimack 7.5-minute Quadrangle, New Hampshire
1989	The geology, botany and chemistry of selected peat-forming environments from temperate and tropical latitudes
1990	Wetland and peat resource map of part of the Townsend 7.5-minute quadrangle, New Hampshire
1990	The geology of selected peat-forming environments in temperate and tropical latitudes
1992	Classifying and mapping wetlands and peat resources using digital cartography
1995	Wetland and peat resource map of the Exeter 7.5-minute Quadrangle, New Hampshire and Massachusetts
1992	Classifying and mapping wetlands and peat resources using digital cartography
1995	Wetland and peat resource map of the Exeter 7.5-minute Quadrangle, New Hampshire and Massachusetts
1995	The Mangrove Peat of the Tobacco Range Islands, Belize Barrier Reef, Central America
1999	Surficial geology of the York Beach quadrangle, Maine
1999	Surficial geology of the Kittery quadrangle, Maine
2007	Surficial geology of the Dover East quadrangle, Maine
2017	Mineral Resources of the Bradwell Bay Wilderness and the Spochoppy River Study Area, Wakulla Country, Florida
