= Allan Cameron =

Allan Cameron may refer to:

- Allan Cameron, 16th century head of Clan Cameron
- Allan Cameron (author) (born 1952), Scottish author and translator
- Allan Cameron (British Army officer) (1917–2011), Scottish soldier and creator of the International Curling Federation
- Allan Cameron (founder), co-founder of, Kincardine, Ontario
- Allan Cameron (politician) (1868–1923), Australian politician
- Allan Cameron (rugby union) (1924–2009), Scotland rugby union player
- Allan Cameron of Lochiel (c. 1567–1647), Scottish clan chief and soldier

== See also ==
- Alan Cameron (disambiguation)
