= Margaret Cameron (philosopher) =

Canadian philosopher

Margaret Anne Cameron is a Canadian philosopher whose research interests include metaphysics and the history of philosophy, including the influence of Aristotelian logic in medieval scholarship, the work of 12th-century scholar Peter Abelard, and the philosophical study of the true crime genre. She is a professor of philosophy and head of the School of Historical and Philosophical Studies at the University of Melbourne in Australia.

== Education and career ==
Cameron is originally from Canada, and was educated in the Toronto public school system. She was a student of gender studies, English literature, and philosophy at the University of Toronto. After a research fellowship at the University of Cambridge in England and an assistant professorship at Hunter College in New York City, she returned to Canada in 2008 to take up a Tier 2 Canada Research Chair in the Aristotelian tradition at the University of Victoria. The chair was renewed in 2014; at the University of Victoria, she also served as associate dean for research. In 2017 she became founding co-editor-in-chief of Metaphysics, the journal of the Canadian Metaphysics Collaborative.

In 2019, she moved to the University of Melbourne with her partner, Klaus Jahn, who held a teaching position at the University of Victoria. She became the first woman to hold a professorship in philosophy at the University of Melbourne.

== Books ==
Cameron's books include:

- Methods and Methodologies: Aristotelian Logic East and West, 500-1500 (edited with John Marenbon, Investigating Medieval Philosophy, Vol. 2, Brill, 2011)
- Linguistic Content: New Essays on the History of Philosophy of Language (edited with Robert J. Stainton, Oxford University Press, 2015)
- Sourcebook in the History of Philosophy of Language: Primary source texts from the Pre-Socratics to Mill (edited with Benjamin Hill and Robert J. Stainton, Springer Graduate Texts in Philosophy, Springer, 2017)
- Philosophy of Mind in the Early and High Middle Ages (edited, The History of the Philosophy of Mind, Vol. 2, Routledge, 2018)
- Critical Reflections on Poetry and Painting (by Jean-Baptiste Du Bos, translated and edited with James O. Young, Brill, 2021, in two vols.)
