= Christina Cameron =

Canadian scientific writer

Christina Cameron CM FRSC
- Born: 1945 (age 80–81); Toronto, Ontario, Canada
- Education: Laval University
- Occupations: Architectural historian; writer
- Awards: Order of Canada

Christina Cameron CM FRSC (born 1945) is a Canadian scientific writer, a former public servant and, from 2005 to 2019, a professor of Heritage conservation and World Heritage. Cameron has been awarded the prestigious Public Service Outstanding Achievement Award, inducted as a Fellow into the Royal Society of Canada, was the 2014 recipient of the National Trust for Canada's Gabrielle Léger Medal for Lifetime Achievement, and was appointed to the Order of Canada in 2014. In 2018, she was awarded the Gérard-Morisset Prix du Québec. One of her former superiors, a chief executive officer of Parks Canada, said that she was "unquestionably the great lady of Canada's cultural heritage."

== Biography ==
In 1969, Cameron moved to Quebec City, where Parks Canada hired her to make an inventory of the city's historic buildings under the Canadian Inventory of Historic Building program. Her five-year assignment fuelled her passion for the architectural heritage of Quebec.

Since the 1970s, she has published extensively and presented many papers on Canadian architecture, heritage management and World Heritage. She has served on the grants committee of the Getty Conservation Institute and has been involved in an international values-based heritage management project sponsored by the institute.

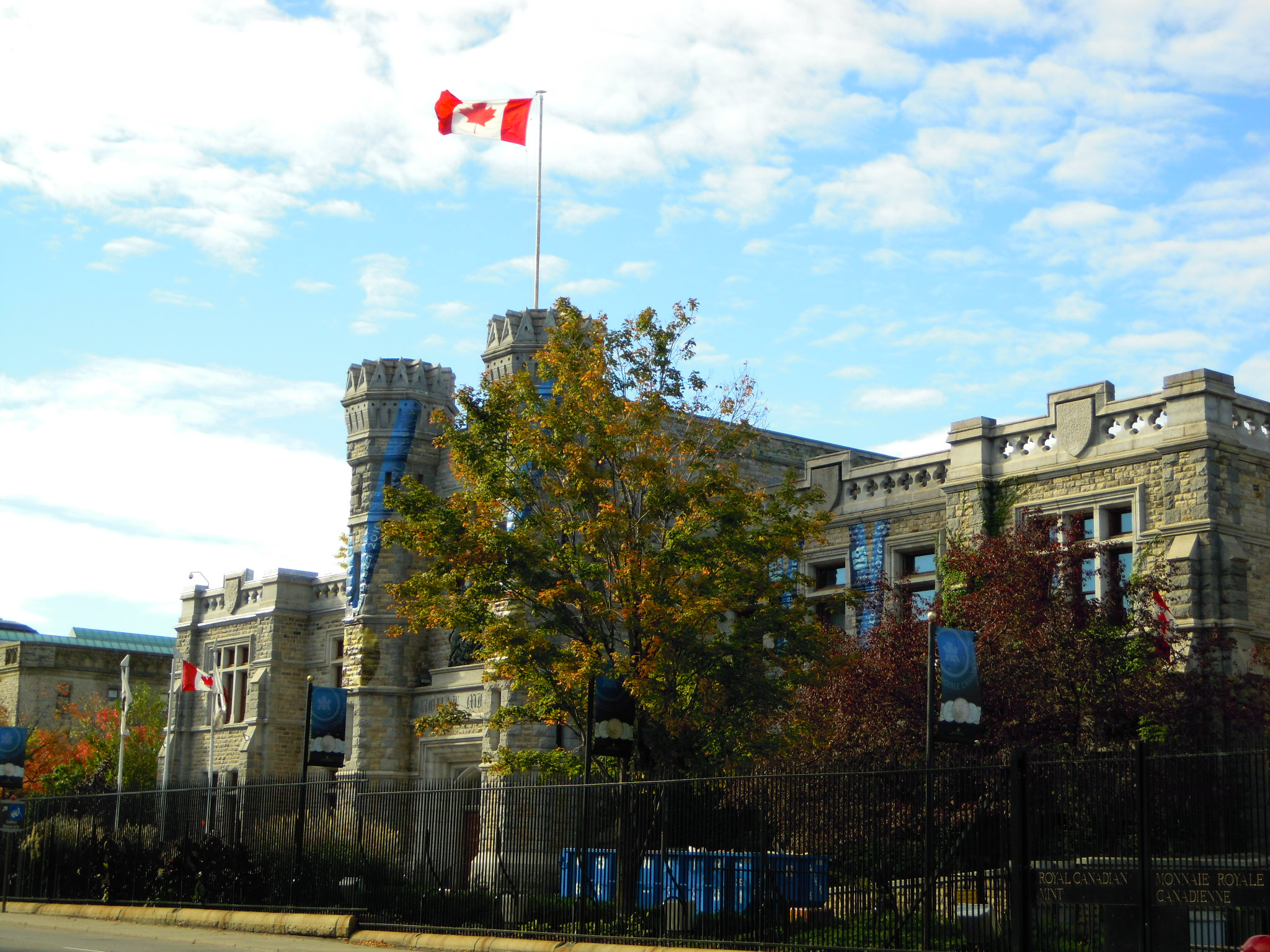
The Royal Canadian Mint's Ottawa office is seen here in 2010. During her time as Heritage Policy Officer for Heritage Canada. Christina Cameron objected to the Mint's refurbishments of the 1990s which contravened the historical character of the edifice.

Cameron held a senior civil servant position for Heritage Canada in the 1990s, when she enforced conservation policies. Cameron served as of Director General of National Historic Sites and Secretary of the Historic Sites and Monuments Board of Canada. She worked for 35 years on behalf of the Canadian Public Service.

In 1990, Cameron was appointed Head of the Canadian Delegation to the World Heritage Committee, a position she held until 2008. She was appointed president of the delegation in 1990 and 2008. In 2007, Cameron was appointed Chair of the World Heritage Committee. In 2008, she received the Government of Canada's Outstanding Achievement Award, the "highest honor of excellence in the federal public service". In 2012, Cameron held the Canada Research Chair in Architectural Heritage at the University of Montreal's School of Architecture. She was also vice-president of the Canadian Commission of UNESCO.

== Publications ==
Taken from the Centre for Studies and International Research of the University of Montreal.

- Bastien, Geneviève G.; Drolet-Dubé, Doris; Southam, Christina (1975). Inventaire des marchés de construction des archives civiles de Québec 1800–1870 [Inventory of Construction Contracts for the Québec Civil Archives 1800–1870] (in French). Ottawa: Parks Canada. p. 1340.
- Cameron, Christina; Trudel, Jean (1976). The Drawings of James Cockburn: A Visit Through Quebec's Past. Toronto: Gage Publishing. p. 176. ISBN 9780802058560.
- Cameron, Christina; Wright, Janet (1980). Second Empire Style in Canadian Architecture. Ottawa: Parks Canada. p. 246.
- Cameron, Christina; Trépanier, Monique (1986). Vieux-Québec: son architecture intérieure [Old Quebec: its interior architecture] (in French). Ottawa: Musée national de l'homme and Parks Canada. p. 529.
- Cameron, Christina (1989). Charles Baillairgé, Architect and Engineer. Montreal/Kingston: McGill-Queen's University Press. p. 201.
- Cameron, Christina (1997). "Commemoration: A Moving Target?". The Place of History: Commemorating Canada's Past. Ottawa: The Royal Society of Canada: 27–39.
- Cameron, Christina (July 1, 2000). "The Spirit of Place: The Physical Memory of Canada". Journal of Canadian Studies. 35 (1): 77–94. doi:10.3138/jcs.35.1.77. S2CID 140371726.
- Cameron, Christina (2003). "Protecting World Heritage: An International Challenge". World Heritage 2002: Shared Legacy, Common Responsibility. Paris: UNESCO: 64–66.
- Cameron, Christina (2004). "Involving Aboriginal People in Site Management". Linking Universal and Local Values: Managing for Sustainable Future for World Heritage (13). Paris: UNESCO: 121–124.
- Cameron, Christina (2006). "Conservation in Changing Societies: World Heritage Indicators". Conservation in Changing Societies: Heritage and Development. Leuven: Raymond Lemaire International Centre for Conservation: 39–47.
- Cameron, Christina (2006). "Value and Integrity in Cultural and Natural Heritage: from Parks Canada to World Heritage". Capturing the Public Value of Heritage: The Proceedings of the London Conference 25–26 January 2006. London: English Heritage: 71–78.
- Cameron, Christina (2007). "Round Table 6: Discovering the Heritage of Humanity". 60 Years of UNESCO History: Proceedings of the International Symposium 16–18 November 2005. Paris: UNESCO: 323–325.
- Cameron, Christina (2008). "From Warsaw to Mostar: The World Heritage Committee and Authenticity". Bulletin of the Association for Preservation Technology. 39 (2–3): 19–24. ISSN 0848-8525.
- Cameron, Christina (2008). "Evolution of the Application of Outstanding Universal Value for Cultural and Natural Heritage". What is OUV? Defining the Outstanding Universal Value of Cultural World Heritage Properties. Berlin: International Council on Monuments and Sites Monuments and Sites XVI: 71–74.
- Cameron, Christina (2009). "La sauvegarde et la transmission du patrimoine religieux: quelques réflexions sur la dimension internationale" [The Safeguarding and Transmission of Religious Heritage: Some Reflections on the International Dimension]. Le Patrimoine Religieux du Québec: éducation et Transmission du Sens (in French). Québec: University of Laval Press: 99–108 and 211–213.
- Cameron, Christina (2009). "Finding the Spirit of Place: A World Heritage Perspective". Spirit of Place: Between Tangible and Intangible Heritage. Québec: Laval University Press: 15–22.
- Cameron, Christina; Déo, Claudine; Valois, Nicole (2010). The Campus: The Architectural and Landscape Heritage of the University of Montreal. Montréal: University of Montreal Press. p. 143.
