= William Cameron =

William, Willie, Bill, or Billy Cameron may refer to:

== Law and politics ==
- William E. Cameron (1842–1927), American politician
- William Cameron (Canadian politician) (1847–1920), Canadian politician in Nova Scotia
- William George Cameron (1853–1930), Canadian politician in British Columbia
- William Cameron (Australian politician) (1877–1931), Australian politician in New South Wales

== Religion ==
- William Cameron (priest) (1688–1765), Irish Anglican priest
- William Cameron (poet) (1751–1811), Scottish poet and minister of the Church of Scotland
- William John Cameron (1907–1990), Scottish minister

== Sports ==
- Willie Cameron (1883–1958), Scottish football player and manager
- Billy Cameron (1896–1972), Canadian ice hockey player
- Bill Cameron (footballer) (1928–2021), Australian rules footballer
- Bill Cameron (rugby league), Australian rugby league player

== Others ==
- William Gordon Cameron (1827–1913), British soldier and colonial administrator
- William Cameron (explorer) (1833–1886), British surveyor who discovered the Cameron Highlands
- William Bleasdell Cameron (1862–1951), Canadian journalist and author
- William J. Cameron (1878–1955), Canadian newspaper editor
- Bill Cameron (philanthropist) (1924–1993), Canadian inventor and engineer
- Bill Cameron (journalist) (1943–2005), Canadian journalist
- W. Bruce Cameron (William Bruce Cameron, born 1960), American novelist and humorist
- Bill Cameron (mystery author) (born 1963), American mystery novelist

== See also ==
- William Cameron Coup (1837–1895), American businessman
- William Cameron Edwards (1844–1921), Canadian businessman and politician
- William Cameron Forbes (1870–1959), American investment banker and diplomat
- William Cameron McCool (1961–2003), American naval commander and astronaut
