= Ron Cameron =

Ron Cameron may refer to:

- Ron Cameron (biblical scholar) (born 1951), American biblical scholar
- Ron Cameron (businessman), (born 1944/1945), American businessman; owner of Mountaire Farms
- Ron Cameron (rower) (1923–2009), Canadian who competed in the 1948 Olympics
- Ron Cameron (sportscaster) (1945–2024), American radio host
- Ronald B. Cameron (1927–2006), American lawyer and politician
- Ronald G. Cameron (1917– 2004), American politician, and army soldier during World War II
- Ronnie Cameron (born 1989), American former NFL player
- Green Party of Canada candidates in the 2004 Canadian federal election#Ron Cameron (Winnipeg South)
