= Alexander Beauchamp Cameron =

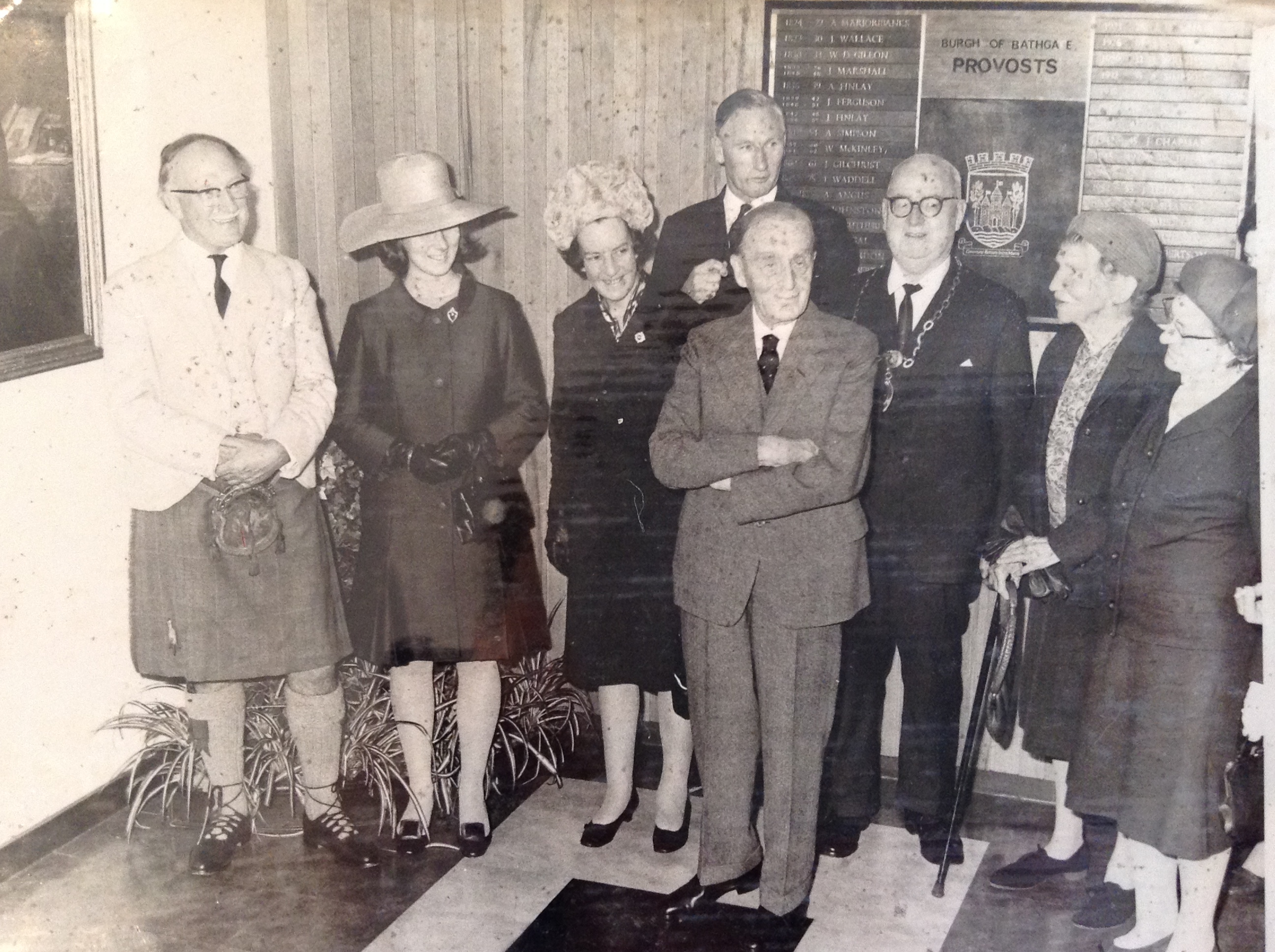
A G B Cameron

Alexander Beauchamp Cameron (1905–1981) was a Scottish artist. He was a portrait painter, watercolourist, master copier and exhibitor. He was commissioned by many famous Scots of the time, and his paintings were featured at the Royal Scottish Academy in Edinburgh and were bought and sold worldwide.

There are a number of A. Camerons in the 20th-century Scottish art world and another Alexander Cameron. To distinguish himself therefore, he signed all his work to include his third name - Beauchamp - to avoid confusion.

Born to William and Mary Isabelle Cameron on 20 June 1905 in Leith, Edinburgh, Sandy, as he was known to his friends, was a keen athlete and won many prizes at Boy Scouts sports event which provided the main opportunity to train for athletics in those days. In his late teens, he competed in relay races with Eric Liddell (famed from Chariots of Fire) and ran an exhibition race against him just prior to the Olympics. He was also a successful high-jumper – his grandfather, Sandy Dees, had been high jump champion of Scotland.

== India ==
At the age of 19, Cameron applied for a managerial post in India, ending up with the responsibility of the Malabar Coast under his belt for the Madura Shipping Company, part of the P&O and BI Lines before his 21st birthday. He married Barbara Girdlestone, who came out to India for a holiday from her home in Kent, and they enjoyed a happy colonial existence filled with sailing and hunting trips in the Nilgiri hills with a staff of over 50 to manage back on the coast. Cameron had to be invalided out of India before he reached his 30th birthday as he was struck down by malaria, followed by a bout of yellow fever, which involved his being shipped home and straight into the Hospital for Tropical Diseases in London, where it was touch and go for several months.

== Military ==
Still weak from his increasing bouts of malaria, Cameron recovered slowly, but the moment World War II came, he enlisted into the army even though he had recently started as a mature student at the Edinburgh College of Art. Initially applying for the Royal Scots, he was transferred to the Royal Artillery – due to his health problems – as a second lieutenant, but very soon became a captain with the defence of the Forth Bridge and the munitions factories at Rosyth very much to the fore.

== Art career ==
When he finally graduated from art college after the war, he went on to take his teaching degree at Moray House, and his life from there on became increasingly busy During this time, he exhibited on a regular basis at Edinburgh's Royal Academy with two notable portraits: Alasdair, his son, and Sonya, a friend's daughter in i944; The Quarry in 1945; Jean in 1947; and Flowerpiece in 1952. By this time he was receiving so many commissions for his work, that he no longer had time to put them forward for exhibition and it seems that from thereon – his work went straight out to his many admirers and patrons. As the years rolled by, by which time he had given up the farm at Hillhouse in Kirknewton (1950), he was developing a very classical style, which led to more and more dignitaries from among the cities of Edinburgh and Glasgow keen to have their portraits painted. He was also very popular amongst the judiciary and military, painting a number of Scottish generals or clan chiefs due to his skills in painting tartans and robes. He was for several years an art teacher at Melville College Edinburgh where he was extremely popular for his patience and kindness. The following are amongst some of his many sitters and patrons over the years up until his sudden death from a heart attack in 1981: Lord Napier of Thirlestane Castle, Alastair Dunnett (editor of The Scotsman), Lord Provost John Millar, Sir Isaac Wolfston, Lord Rosebury, General Sir Henry Leask and The Earl of Inchcape.

Cameron was also called upon to restore or copy a large number of old master paintings from all over Scotland.

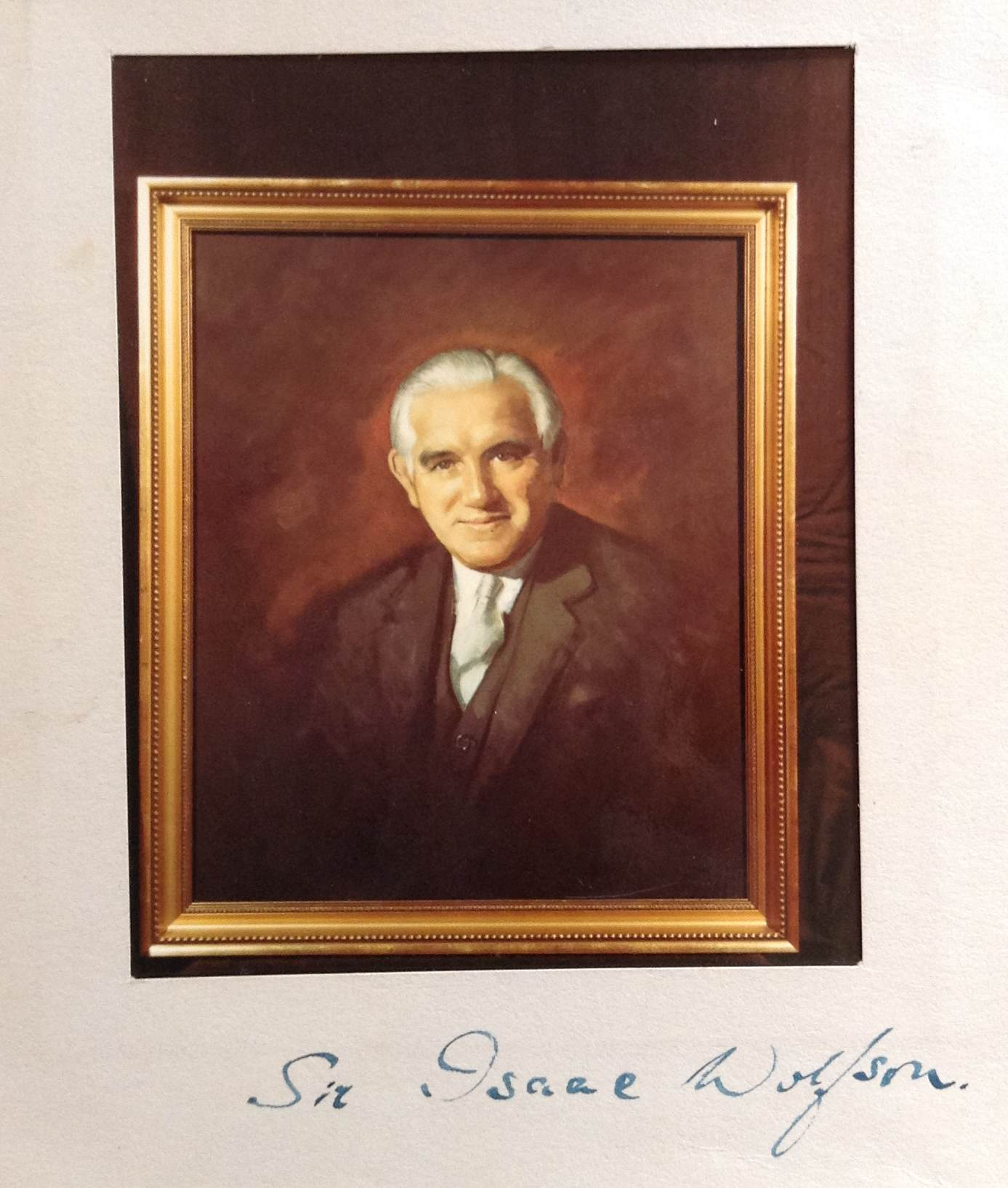
Portrain of Sir Isaac Wolfston

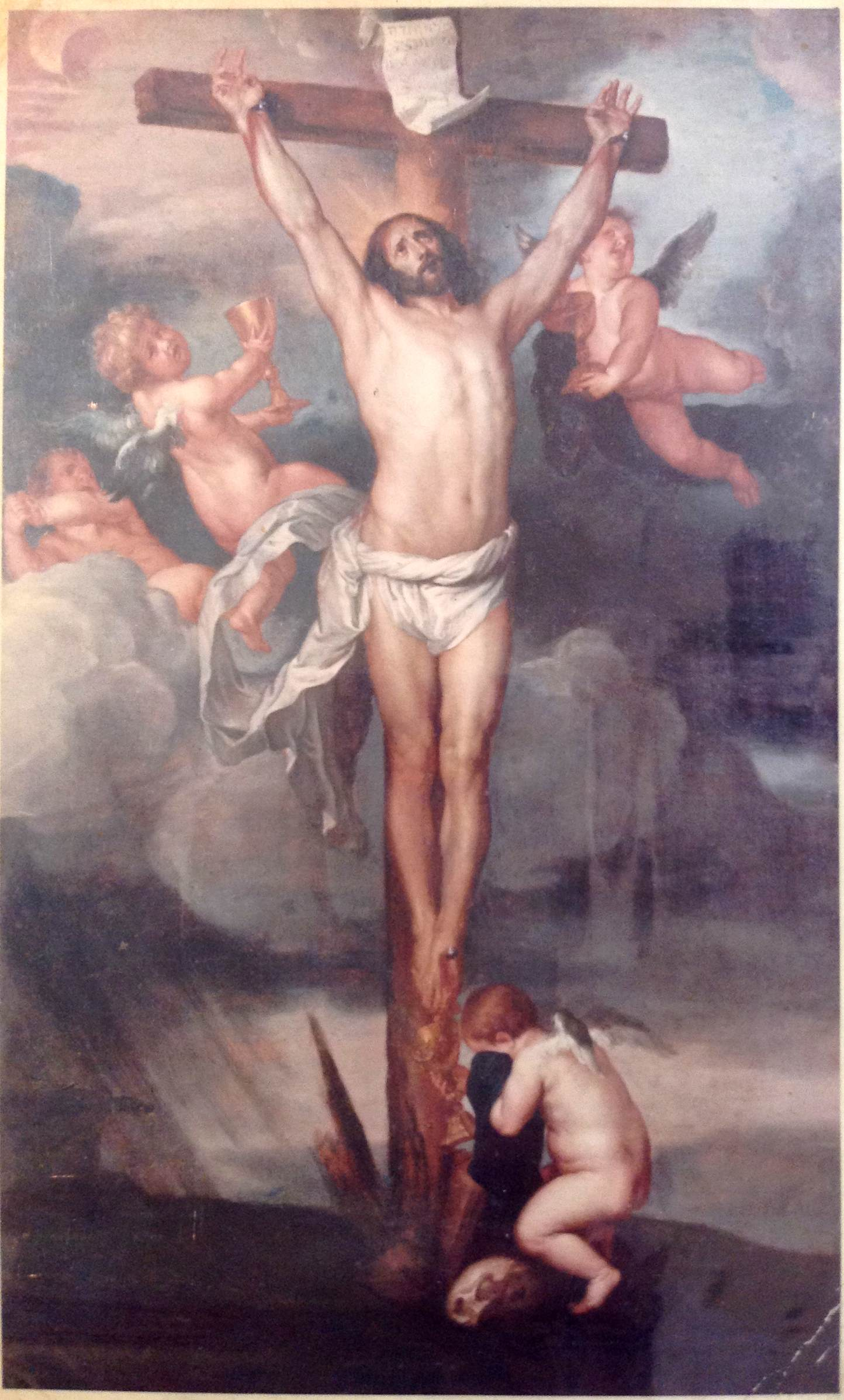
Old Master Copy by Alexander G Beauchamp Cameron

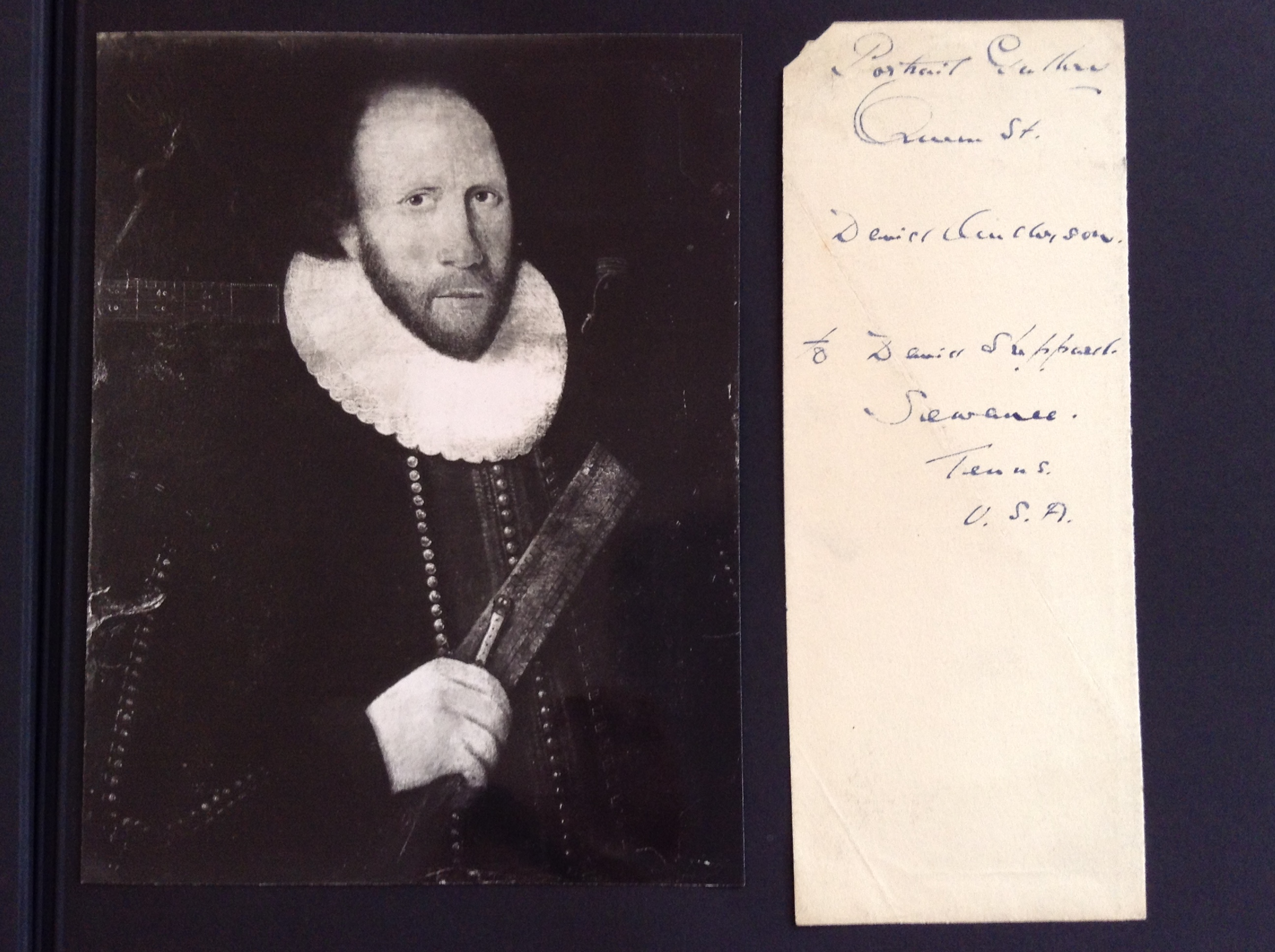
Old Master Commissioned Copy

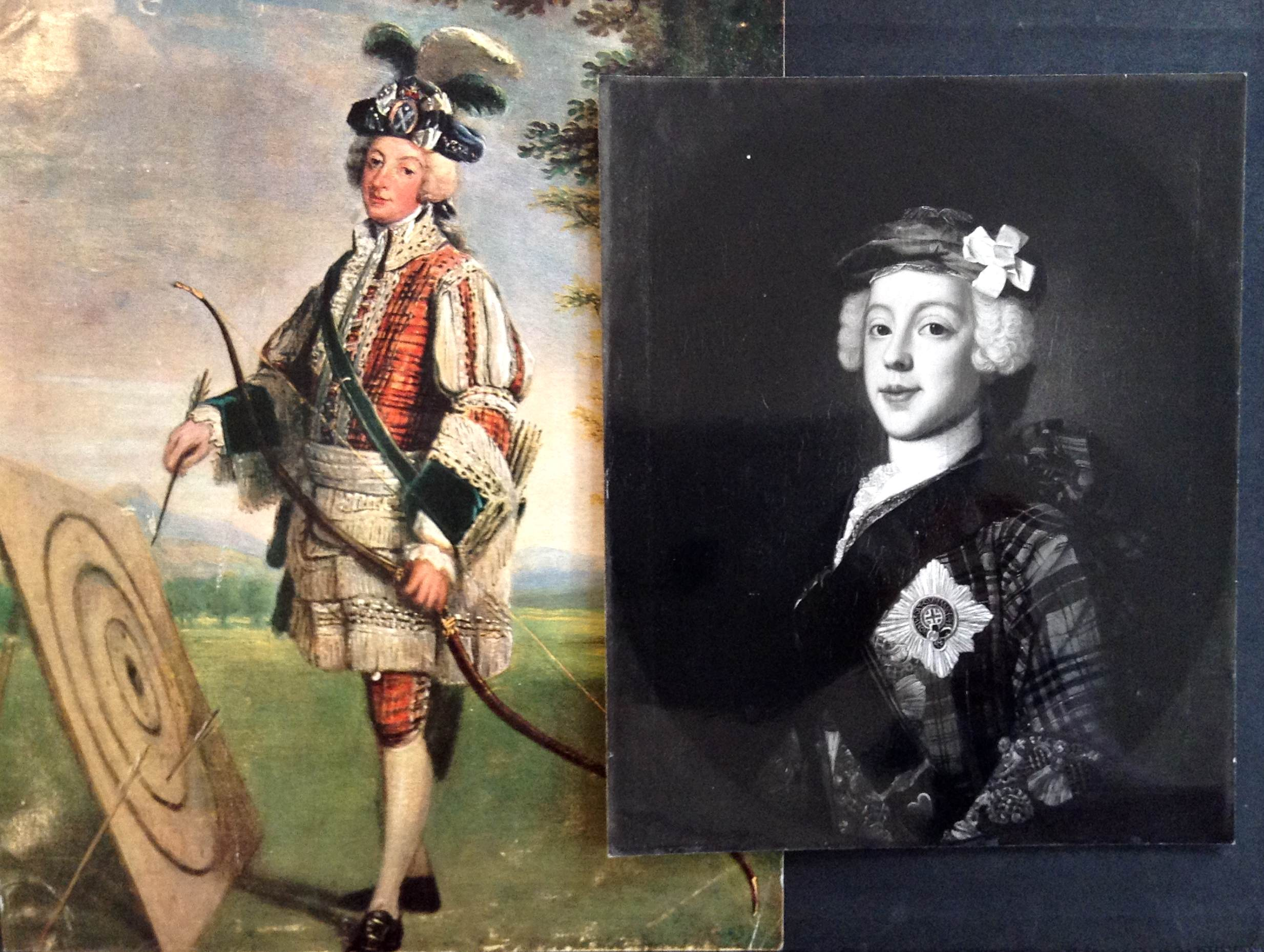
Old Master Commissioned Copy

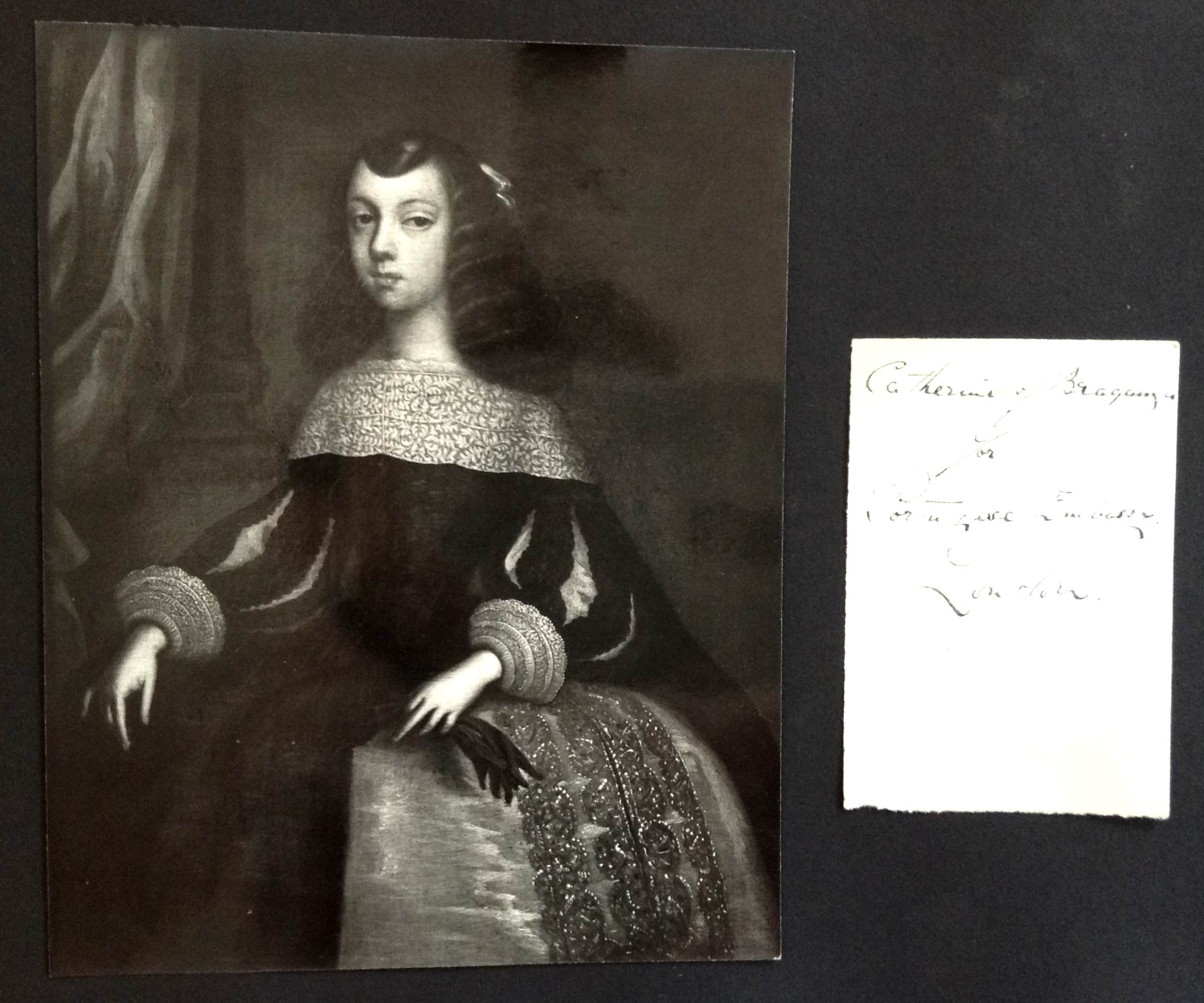
Catherine de Braganza, painted by Alexander Beauchamp Cameron for The Portuguese Embassy

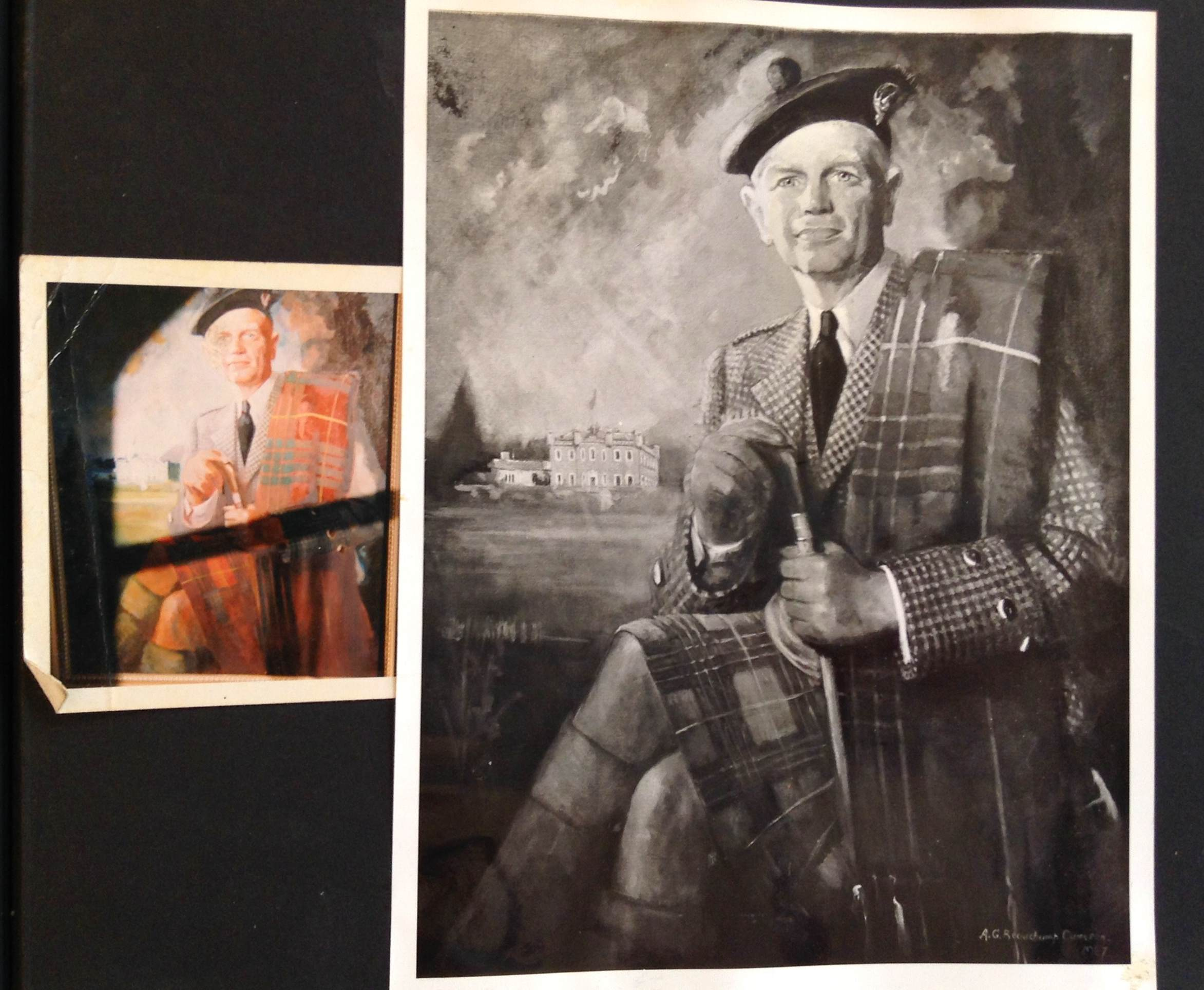
A G B Cameron

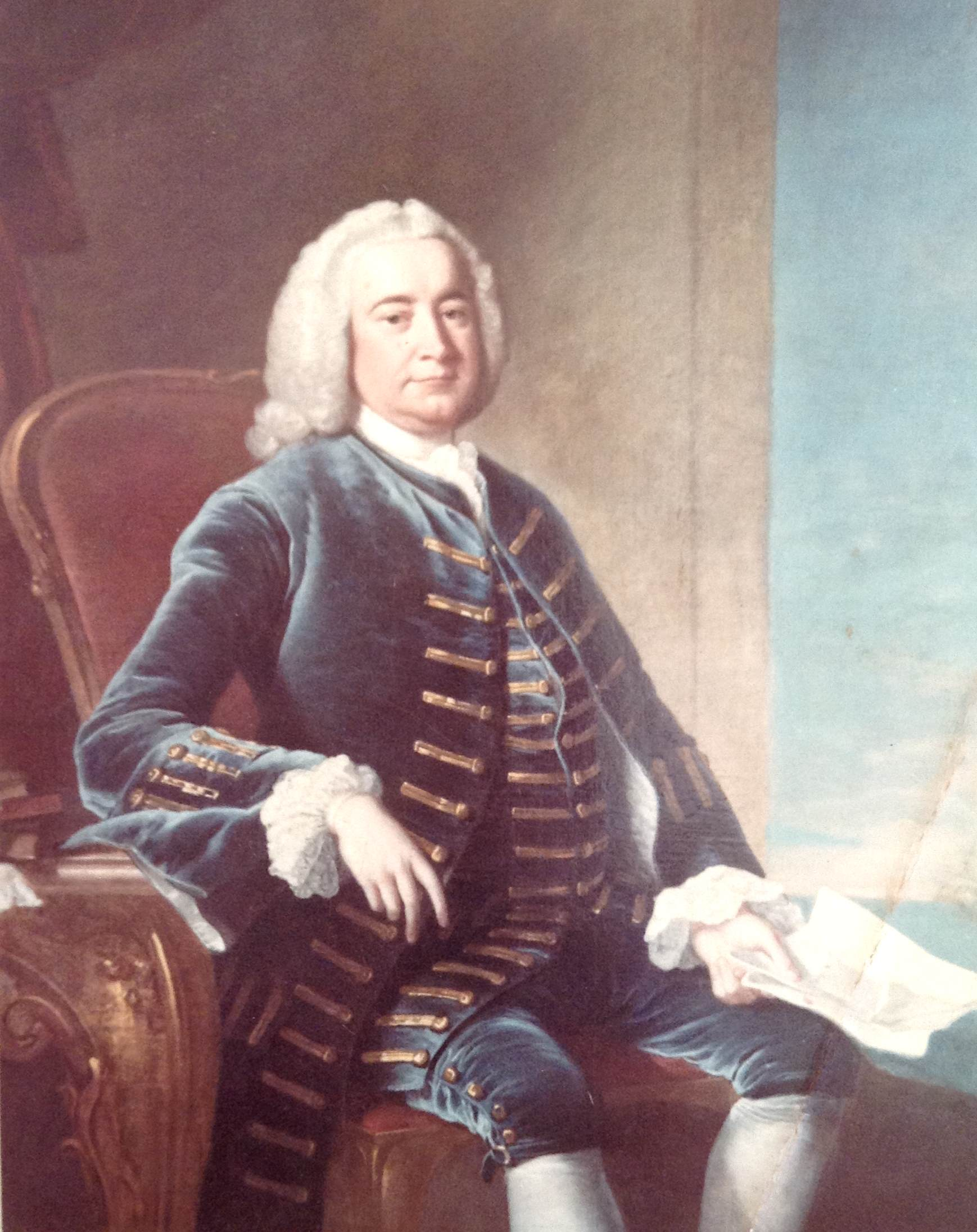
A G B Cameron

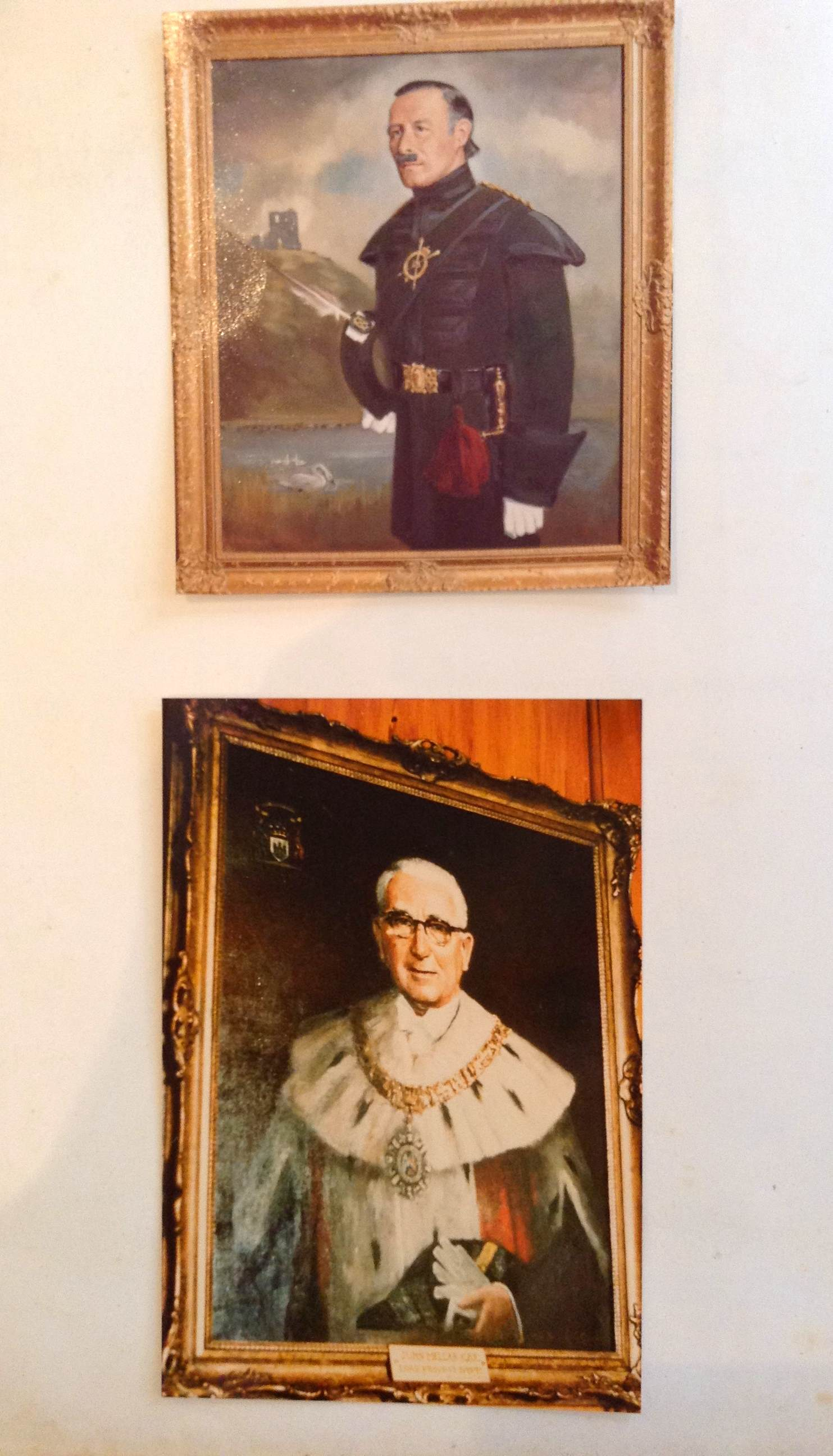
A G B Cameron
