= Ewen Cameron (cricketer) =

New Zealand cricketer

Personal information
- Full name: Ewen Henry John Cameron
- Born: 1 March 1921; Dunedin, Otago, New Zealand
- Died: 12 January 1997 (aged 75); Clyde, Central Otago, New Zealand
- Batting: Right-handed
- Bowling: Left-arm medium-fast

Domestic team information
- Years: Team
- 1953/54–1954/55: Otago
- Source: ESPNcricinfo, 6 May 2016

Ewen Henry John Cameron (1 March 1921 – 12 January 1997) was a New Zealand cricketer. He played five first-class matches for Otago in the 1953–54 and 1954–55 seasons.

Cameron was born at Dunedin in 1921 and worked a country schoolteacher who was famous locally for writing musicals. He was educated at Waitaki Boys' High School and made his representative debut for Otago at the age of 32―Wisden said "belatedly"―taking two wickets on debut, conceding just 30 runs from 32 overs. He died in 1997 at Clyde in Central Otago at the age of 75. Obituaries were published in the 1997 New Zealand Cricket Almanack and in Wisden the following year.
