= Sean Cameron =

Sean Cameron may refer to:

- Sean Cameron (Degrassi character)
- Sean Cameron (footballer)
