= Colin Cameron =

Colin Cameron may refer to:

- Colin Cameron (American football), American football coach and administrator
- Colin Cameron (Canadian politician) (1896–1968), Canadian Member of Parliament
- Colin Cameron (footballer) (born 1972), Scottish football player
- Colin Cameron (Malawian politician), Member of the Legislative Council and minister in Malawi
- Colin Stewart Cameron, politician and lawyer in Ontario, Canada
- A. Colin Cameron (born 1956), Australian econometrician
