= John Clephane =

Scottish physician (died 1758)

John Clephane, M.D. (died 1758), was a Scottish physician.

Clephane took his degree of M.D. at St. Andrews University on 29 May 1729. He acted as physician to the army in the Low Countries. He was appointed physician to St George's Hospital on 8 May 1751, and admitted a licentiate of the College of Physicians on 25 June 1762. He was elected a fellow of the Royal Society on 8 January 1746, but was not admitted until 4 May 1749.

Clephane died in the Isle of Wight on 11 October 1758. He was in the expedition to Quiberon Bay in 1746 under General St. Clair. He was afterwards the familiar friend and correspondent of David Hume, St. Clair's secretary.
