= Douglas Cameron =

Douglas Cameron may refer to:

- Douglas Cameron (politician) (1854–1921), Canadian politician and Lieutenant Governor of Manitoba
- Douglas Cameron (RAF officer) (1893–1939), World War I flying ace
- Douglas Cameron (cricketer) (1903–1996), New Zealand cricketer
- Douglas Cameron (broadcaster) (born 1933), Scottish broadcaster
- Douglas Cameron (bishop) (born 1935), Scottish bishop
- Dougie Cameron (born 1983), Scottish football midfielder

== See also ==
- Doug Cameron (disambiguation)
- Cameron Douglas (born 1978), American former actor
