= Alexander Donald Cameron =

English copra trader (1873–1957)

- Born: 21 July 1873; Tottenham, England
- Died: 23 January 1957 (aged 83)

Alexander Donald Cameron (21 July 1873 – 23 January 1957) was a trader of Scottish descent who founded the Tonga Ma'a Tonga Kautaha (Tonga for Tongans Cooperative) in Tonga in 1909 to prevent the commercial exploitation of Tongan copra growers by European middlemen who controlled the market.

== Family and early life ==
Cameron, born in Tottenham, England, was the second of eight children of a Scottish headmaster. Following an unsuccessful career in a tea company, first in London and then in Ceylon, India and Australia, he arrived in Tonga in 1901 as the branch manager of Sydney-based trading firm Burns Philp. Here, too, he was unsuccessful, soon being dismissed from the business, following which he took to drink and banished himself to a distant island for fifteen months to recuperate. In 1903 he married Clara Elizabeth (Kelela) Cocker, daughter of a European trader and a Tongan woman and granddaughter of Joshua Cocker, who had been British Vice-Consul of Tonga from May 1862 to August 1866. For a while he worked a commercial banana plantation on land belonging to his wife's family, but bankruptcy eventually brought an end to this enterprise.

== Tonga Ma'a Tonga Kautaha ==
In 1909 Cameron devised the idea of a Tongan cooperative of copra growers called Tonga Ma'a Tonga Kautaha and with the support of a noble titleholder, Vaea of Hauma, organised meetings in villages around Tongatapu, the main island in the Kingdom of Tonga, to explain the concept, that in addition to providing growers with a more lucrative alternative to the European trader cartel for the export of their produce it would also serve as a vehicle for Tongan aspirations and the acquisition of business skills of non-indigenous residents.

Prior to the formation of Tonga Ma'a Tonga Kautaha, exporting of Tonga's copra crop had been under the control of European traders who benefited greatly from exceedingly high profit margins. They also controlled imports, often charging Tongans twice the price that they charged European residents.

The Kautaha opened in May 1909 with 1,300 members and by later that year had 3,280 from all three main islands in the kingdom - Tongatapu, Vava’u and Ha’apai - including many of Tonga's most influential nobles and chiefs. According to Mateialona, the Premier of Tonga at that time, Cameron was spoken of generally among Kautaha members as “an angel descended from Heaven to deliver them from the bondage of the White traders.”

Cameron's motivation was not solely benevolent. He earned a modest commission on sales which due to the large quantities of produce exported earned him between £1,300 to £1,500 during the first year of operation, contrasting starkly with his previous status as a bankrupt.

The cooperative drew the ire of the islands' European traders, who through the support of the local British Agent caused the collective to be investigated by the Auditor General and a report of the findings presented to its members, leading to its closure by Tonga's Premier on grounds of financial irregularities, for which Cameron was subsequently charged. On appeal, Cameron was acquitted of any wrongdoing and attempted to reform the collective, which was not successful and closed in about 1916, after which he relocated to Australia.

Cameron's venture had the unanticipated outcome of enhancing the nation's autonomy and significantly strengthening the authority of its monarch, King George Tupou II, following Cameron's acquittal because of the heavy-handedness of William Telfer Campbell, the British Agent, regarding the investigation and in his dealings with the monarch, which led to a redefining of the role of his office in relation to advice given to the monarch.
