= Robert Cameron (cricketer) =

Australian cricketer (born 1938)

Personal information
- Full name: Robert Alastair Cameron
- Born: 6 September 1938; North Adelaide, South Australia
- Died: 17 May 2012 (aged 73); Buderim, Queensland
- Batting: Right-handed
- Bowling: Right-arm medium
- Role: All-rounder

Domestic team information
- Years: Team
- 1957/58–1958/59: South Australia

Career statistics
Competition	First-class
Matches	4
Runs scored	118
Batting average	23.6
100s/50s	0/1
Top score	88*
Balls bowled	768
Wickets	4
Bowling average	89.00
5 wickets in innings	0
10 wickets in match	0
Best bowling	1/26
Catches/stumpings	1/–
- Source: Cricinfo, 21 May 2018

Robert Alastair Cameron (6 September 1938 – 17 May 2012) was an Australian cricketer. He played four first-class matches for South Australia, three in 1957–58 and one the following season.
