= Robert Cameron (Queen's Park footballer) =

Scottish footballer

Personal information
- Place of birth: Scotland
- Positions: Wing half; full back

Senior career*
Years	Team	Apps	(Gls)
1909–1911	Queen's Park	5	(2)
- * Club domestic league appearances and goals

Robert J. Cameron was a Scottish amateur footballer who played as a wing half in the Scottish League for Queen's Park.

== Personal life ==
Cameron served as a lance corporal in the Queen's Own Cameron Highlanders during the First World War.

== Career statistics ==
Appearances and goals by club, season and competition
Club	Season	League			Scottish Cup		Total	
Club	Season	Division	Apps	Goals	Apps	Goals	Apps	Goals
Queen's Park	1909–10	Scottish First Division	2	1	0	0	2	1
Queen's Park	1910–11	Scottish First Division	3	1	0	0	3	1
Career total			5	2	0	0	5	2
