= Daniel Cameron =

Daniel, Dan or Danny Cameron may refer to:

== Politicians ==
- Daniel Alexander Cameron (1870–1937), Canadian politician from the province of Nova Scotia
- Daniel R. Cameron (1885–1933), lumber merchant and political figure in Nova Scotia, Canada
- Daniel Cameron (Australian politician) (c. 1819–1906), member of the Victorian Legislative Assembly, 1856–1859
- Daniel Cameron (American politician) (born 1985), Kentucky Attorney General, 2019–2024
- Danny Cameron (politician) (1924–2009), Leader of the Opposition in the Legislative Assembly of New Brunswick, Canada

== Others ==
- Colonel Daniel Cameron
- Dan Cameron (born 1956), American art curator
- Danny Cameron (footballer) (born 1953), Scottish footballer
