= Doug Cameron (engineer) =

American engineer (born 1957)

Douglas Cameron
- Born: March 22, 1957 (age 69); Champaign, Illinois, U.S.
- Education: Duke University (B.S.E, biomedical engineering), Massachusetts Institute of Technology (Ph.D., biochemical engineering)
- Occupations: Engineer, inventor, and investor
- Spouse: Sally Jo Cameron
- Children: Jeffrey, Derek, Sarah, Michael (Mac) Cameron

Douglas Carlyle Cameron (born March 22, 1957) is an American engineer, inventor, and investor. He is a senior managing director for the U.S.-China Green Fund. He is on the board of the Foundation for Food and Agriculture Research (FFAR) and is a technical and business advisor to organizations including the VTT (Finland), and the Center for Bioenergy Innovation (USA).

== Early life and education ==
Cameron was born in Champaign, Illinois. The oldest of three brothers, he grew up in the Chicago suburb, Westchester, and graduated in 1975 from Proviso West High School, Hillside, Illinois.

Cameron graduated from Duke University (1979) with a B.S.E. in Biomedical Engineering. In May 1979 he joined Advanced Harvesting Systems, a start-up company focused on large-scale plant protein purification, as the first non-founding member of the company.

He was married in August 1979 to Sally Jo Clark.

Cameron started graduate school at the Massachusetts Institute of Technology in July 1981 and graduated with a Ph.D. in biochemical engineering in December 1986. His Ph.D. advisor was Charles L. Cooney. His Ph.D. thesis was titled “The Production of R-1,2-Propanediol by Clostridium thermosaccharolyticum.”

== Career ==
In December 1986, Cameron joined the Department of Chemical Engineering at the University of Wisconsin—Madison, as an assistant professor and advanced to full professor. The focus of his research was metabolic engineering (a field now more commonly known as synthetic biology) and industrial microbiology. One of his first projects was the engineering of the microbial pathway for 1,3-propanediol in Escherichia coli. This work was an early step in a process that was eventually commercialized by DuPont and Tate & Lyle. He is also the inventor of a process for the microbial production of 3-hydroxypropionic acid, which provides a bio-based route to industrial chemicals such as acrylic acid. In 1996 he did a sabbatical at the ETH Zurich (Switzerland) in the laboratory of James (Jay) E. Bailey. In 1998 he took a leave of absence to start the Biotechnology Development Center (BioTDC) at Cargill, Inc. in Minneapolis. In 2000 he officially left the University of Wisconsin.

Cameron was at Cargill, Inc. from 1998 to 2006, where he was Director of Biotechnology and chief scientist. While at Cargill he worked closely with NatureWorks on the development of a low-pH process for lactic acid as a feedstock for polylactic acid. He and his team also worked with Cargill Ventures on deal-sourcing and due-diligence.

In June 2006, Cameron moved from Cargill to join the newly formed Silicon Valley venture capital firm, Khosla Ventures, as chief scientific officer.

In 2008, Cameron returned to the Midwest to help Piper Jaffray build and grow its clean tech investment business. In 2010 he left Piper Jaffray to start Alberti Advisors, a technology and financial consulting business, and to begin raising a clean tech venture fund.

In 2011, Cameron and his partner, Tom Erickson, announced the formation of First Green Partners, a venture capital fund focused on early-stage investments in green technologies and environmentally-sound uses of fossil resources such as natural gas, backed by Warburg Pincus. The fund has two remaining portfolio companies, Trelys and Monolith Materials. Cameron is on the board of Trelys.

In 2017, Cameron joined the U.S.-China Green Fund, a China-based investment firm focused on addressing environmental problems in China. The U.S. office is in Chicago.

== Awards and honors ==
Raphael Katzen Award, Society for Industrial Microbiology, 2009. Fellow, Class of 2008, American Society for the Advancement of Science (AAAS). Featured profile, Nature Biotechnology, November 2007. Fellow, Society of Industrial Microbiology, 2003. College of Fellows, Class of 2001, American Institute of Medical and Biological Engineering (AIMBE).

== U.S. Patents ==
- Polypeptides and biosynthetic pathways for the production of monatin and its precursors, U.S. Patent 9,034,610.
- Polypeptides and biosynthetic pathways for the production of monatin and its precursors, U.S. Patent 8,435,765.
- Polypeptides and biosynthetic pathways for the production of monatin and its precursors, U.S. Patent 8,372,989.
- Production of monatin and monatin precursors, U.S. Patent 8,206,955.
- Polypeptides and biosynthetic pathways for the production of monatin and its precursors. U.S. Patent 7,572,607.
- Production of 3-hydroxypropionic acid in recombinant organisms, U.S. Patent 6,852,517.
- Microbial production of 1,2-propanediol from sugar, U.S. Patent 6,303,352.
- Microbial production of 1,2-propanediol from sugar, U.S. Patent 6,087,140.
- Novel glycerol phosphatase with stereo-specific activity. U.S. Patent 5,733,749.
- Polysaccharide composition and process for preparing same. U.S. Patent 5,288,618.
- Galactomannan polysaccharide producing organism. U.S. Patent 5,130,249.

== Publications ==
- Cameron, D.C. (2006). "The roots of the Wang academic family tree". Biotechnology and Bioengineering. 95 (2): 218–219. doi:10.1002/bit.21079. PMID 16933292. S2CID 41985116.
- Zhu, M.M.; Lawman, P.D.; Cameron, D. C. (2002). "Improving 1,3-Propanediol Production from Glycerol in a Metabolically Engineered Escherichia coli by Reducing Accumulation of sn-Glycerol-3-phosphate". Biotechnol. Prog. 18 (4): 694–699. doi:10.1021/bp020281+. PMID 12153300.
- Zhu, M.M.; Skraly, F.A.; Cameron, D.C. (2001). "Accumulation of methyglyoxal in anaerobically grown Escherichia coli and its detoxification by expression of the Pseudomonas putida glyoxalase I gene". Metabolic Engineering. 3 (3): 218–225. doi:10.1006/mben.2001.0186. PMID 11461144.
- Altaras, N.E.; Etzel, M.R.; Cameron, D.C. (2001). "Conversion of sugars to 1,2-propanediol by Thermoanaerobacterium thermosaccharolyticum HG-8". Biotechnol. Prog. 17 (1): 52–56. doi:10.1021/bp000130b. PMID 11170479. S2CID 25684126.
- Altaras, N.E.; Cameron, D. (2000). "Enhanced production of R-1,2-propanediol by a metabolically engineered Escherichia coli". Biotechnol. Prog. 16 (6): 940–946. doi:10.1021/bp000076z. PMID 11101319. S2CID 30208645.
- Yu, W-C.; Joyce, P.J.; Cameron, D.C.; McCown, B.H. (2000). "Sucrose utilization during potato microtuber growth in bioreactors". Plant Cell Reports. 19 (4): 407–413. Bibcode:2000PCelR..19..407Y. doi:10.1007/s002990050748. PMID 30754795. S2CID 32579655.
- Altaras, N.E.; Cameron, D.C. (1999). "Metabolic engineering of a 1,2-propanediol pathway in Escherichia coli". Appl. Environ. Microbiol. 65 (3): 1180–1185. Bibcode:1999ApEnM..65.1180A. doi:10.1128/aem.65.3.1180-1185.1999. PMC 91161. PMID 10049880.
- Cameron, D.C.; Altaras, N.E.; Hoffman, M.L.; Shaw, A.J. (1998). "Metabolic engineering of propanediol pathways". Biotechnol. Prog. 14 (1): 116–125. doi:10.1021/bp9701325. PMID 9496676. S2CID 32516658.
- Sauer, U.; Cameron, D.C.; Bailey, J.E. (1998). "Metabolic capacity of Bacillus subtilis for the production of purine nucleotides, riboflavin, and folic acid". Biotechnol. Bioeng. 59 (2): 227–238. doi:10.1002/(sici)1097-0290(19980720)59:2<227::aid-bit10>3.0.co;2-b. PMID 10099333.
- Skraly, F.A.; Lytle, B.L.; Cameron, D.C. (1998). "Construction and characterization of a 1,3-propanediol operon". Appl. Environ. Microbiol. 64 (1): 98–105. Bibcode:1998ApEnM..64...98S. doi:10.1128/aem.64.1.98-105.1998. PMC 124678. PMID 9435066.
- Skraly, F.A.; Cameron, D.C. (1998). "Purification and characterization of a Bacillus licheniformis phosphatase specific for D-alpha-glycerophosphate". Arch. Biochem. Biophys. 349 (1): 27–35. doi:10.1006/abbi.1997.0433. PMID 9439579.
- Chaplen, F.W.R.; Fahl, W.E.; Cameron, D.C. (1998). "Evidence of high levels of methylglyoxal in cultured Chinese hamster ovary cells". PNAS. 95 (10): 5533–5538. Bibcode:1998PNAS...95.5533C. doi:10.1073/pnas.95.10.5533. PMC 20412. PMID 9576917.
- Cameron, D.C.; Chaplen, F.W.R. (1997). "Developments in metabolic engineering". Curr. Opin. Biotechnol. 8 (2): 175–180. doi:10.1016/s0958-1669(97)80098-5. PMID 9079723.
- Chaplen, F.W.R.; Fahl, W.E.; Cameron, D.C. (1996). "Effect of endogenously formed methylglyoxal on animal cells grown in culture". Cytotechnology. 22 (1–3): 33–42. doi:10.1007/bf00353922. PMID 22358913. S2CID 25512984.
- Chaplen, F.W.R.; Fahl, W.E.; Cameron, D.C. (1996). "Method for determination of free intracellular and extracellular methylglyoxal in animal cells grown in culture". Anal. Biochem. 238 (2): 171–178. doi:10.1006/abio.1996.0271. PMID 8660607.
- Chaplen, F.W.R.; Fahl, W.E.; Cameron, D.C. (1996). "Detection of methylglyoxal as a degradation product of DNA and nucleic acid components treated with strong acid". Anal. Biochem. 236 (2): 262–269. doi:10.1006/abio.1996.0165. PMID 8660503.
- Romich, M.S., D.C. Cameron, and M.R. Etzel. 1995. Three methods for large scale preservation of a microbial inoculum for bioremediation, in Bioaugementation for Site Remediation, R.E. Hinchee, J. Fredrickson and B.C. Alleman (eds.), Battelle Press, Columbus, MD.
- Koob, M.D.; Shaw, A.J.; Cameron, D.C. (1994). "Minimizing the genome of Escherichia coli: motivation and strategy". Annals of the New York Academy of Sciences. 745: 1–3. doi:10.1111/j.1749-6632.1994.tb44359.x. PMID 7832501. S2CID 82803149.
- Cameron, D.C.; Tong, I.-T. (1993). "Cellular and metabolic engineering: an overview". Appl. Biochem. Biotechnol. 38 (1–2): 105–140. doi:10.1007/bf02916416. PMID 8346901. S2CID 28117582.
- Wall, M.B.; Cameron, D.C.; Lightfoot, E.N. (1993). "Biopulping process design and kinetics". Biotechnol. Adv. 11 (3): 645–662. doi:10.1016/0734-9750(93)90033-j. PMID 14545684.
- Flatt, J.H.; Gonzalez, J.M.; Cooper, T.A.; Dogger, D.E.; Lightfoot, E.N.; Cameron, D.C. (1992). "An anionic galactomannan polysaccharide gum from a newly-isolated lactose-utilizing bacterium: II. Fermentation kinetics and lactose transport". Biotechnol. Prog. 8: 335–339. doi:10.1021/bp00016a010. S2CID 84408938.
- Flatt, J.H.; Hardin, R.S.; Gonzalez, J.M.; Dogger, D.E.; Lightfoot, E.N.; Cameron, D.C. (1992). "An anionic galactomannan polysaccharide gum from a newly-isolated lactose-utilizing bacterium: I. Strain description and gum characterization". Biotechnol. Prog. 8 (4): 327–334. doi:10.1021/bp00016a009. PMID 1368454. S2CID 6637209.
- Tong, I-T.; Cameron, D.C. (1992). "Enhancement of 1,3-propanediol production by cofermentation in Escherichia coli expressing Klebsiella pneumoniae dha regulon genes". Appl. Biochem. Biotechnol. 34: 149–159. doi:10.1007/BF02920542. PMID 1622202. S2CID 11151996.
- Malcata, F.X.; Cameron, D.C. (1992). "Optimal design of a series of CSTR's performing reversible reactions catalyzed by soluble enzymes: a theoretical study". Biocatalysis. 5 (3): 233–248. doi:10.3109/10242429209014870. hdl:10400.14/5398. S2CID 84568778.
- Tong, I.-T.; Liao, H.H.; Cameron, D.C. (1991). "1,3-propanediol production by Escherichia coli expressing genes from the Klebsiella pneumoniae dha regulon". Appl. Environ. Microbiol. 57 (12): 3541–3546. Bibcode:1991ApEnM..57.3541T. doi:10.1128/aem.57.12.3541-3546.1991. PMC 184009. PMID 1785929.
- Iuchi, S.; Cameron, D.C.; Lin, E.C.C. (1989). "A second global regulator gene (arcB) mediating repression of enzymes in aerobic pathways of Escherichia coli". J. Bacteriol. 171 (2): 868–873. doi:10.1128/jb.171.2.868-873.1989. PMC 209676. PMID 2644240.
- Simon, E.S.; Whitesides, G.M.; Cameron, D.C.; Weitz, D.; Cooney, C.L. (1987). "A combined microbial/chemical synthesis having high enantiomeric excess of (+)-(R)-methyloxirane". J. Org. Chem. 52: 4042–4044. doi:10.1021/jo00227a018.
- Sanchez-Riera, F.; Cameron, D.C.; Cooney, C.L. (1987). "Influence of environmental factors in the production of 1,2-propanediol by Clostridium thermosaccharolyticum". Biotechnol. Lett. 9 (7): 449–454. doi:10.1007/BF01027450. S2CID 38758808.
- Cameron, D.C.; Cooney, C.L. (1986). "A novel fermentation: the production of R(-)-1,2-propanediol and acetol by Clostridium thermosaccharolyticum". Bio/Technology. 4 (7): 651–654. doi:10.1038/nbt0786-651. S2CID 33624925.
