= James Cameron (South African cricketer) =

South African cricketer (born 1979)

Personal information
- Full name: James Cameron
- Born: 20 September 1979 (age 47); Johannesburg, Transvaal Province, South Africa
- Batting: Right-handed
- Bowling: Right-arm fast-medium

Domestic team information
- Years: Team
- 2000: Nottinghamshire Cricket Board

Career statistics
| Competition | LA |
|---|---|
| Matches | 1 |
| Runs scored | 6 |
| Batting average | 6.00 |
| 100s/50s | –/– |
| Top score | 6 |
| Balls bowled | 24 |
| Wickets | – |
| Bowling average | – |
| 5 wickets in innings | – |
| 10 wickets in match | – |
| Best bowling | – |
| Catches/stumpings | –/– |
- Source: Cricinfo, 21 November 2010

James Cameron (born 20 September 1979) is a former South African cricketer. Cameron was a right-handed batsman who bowled right-arm fast-medium. He was born in Johannesburg, Transvaal Province.

Cameron represented the Nottinghamshire Cricket Board in a single List A match against the Gloucestershire Cricket Board in the 1st round of the 2000 NatWest Trophy. In his only List A match he scored 6 runs and bowled 4 wicket-less overs.
