= Richard Cameron =

Richard Cameron may refer to:

- Richard Cameron (Covenanter) (1648?–1680), English leader of the Covenanters
- Richard Cameron (writer) (born 1948), English playwright
- Richard Cameron (Kansas politician) (1925–2009), American politician and member of the Kansas House of Representatives
- Richard Cameron, member of Dutch electronic music duo Arling & Cameron
- Richard Cameron, character in Dead Poets Society
- Dick Cameron (wrestler), two-time holder of the Australian Middleweight Championship in the 1930s
