= Malcolm Cameron =

Malcolm Cameron may refer to:

- Malcolm Cameron (Australian politician) (1873–1935), Australian politician
- Malcolm Cameron (Canadian politician) (1808–1876), Canadian businessman and political figure
- Malcolm Cameron (entomologist) (1873–1954), English physician and entomologist
- Malcolm Cameron (ice hockey) (born 1969), Canadian professional ice hockey coach
- Malcolm Colin Cameron (1831–1898), businessman and member of the Canadian House of Commons
- Malcolm Graeme Cameron (1857–1925), lawyer and member of the Ontario legislative assembly
- Cam Cameron (Malcolm Cameron, born 1961), American football coach
