= Hector Charles Cameron =

British physician and paediatrician

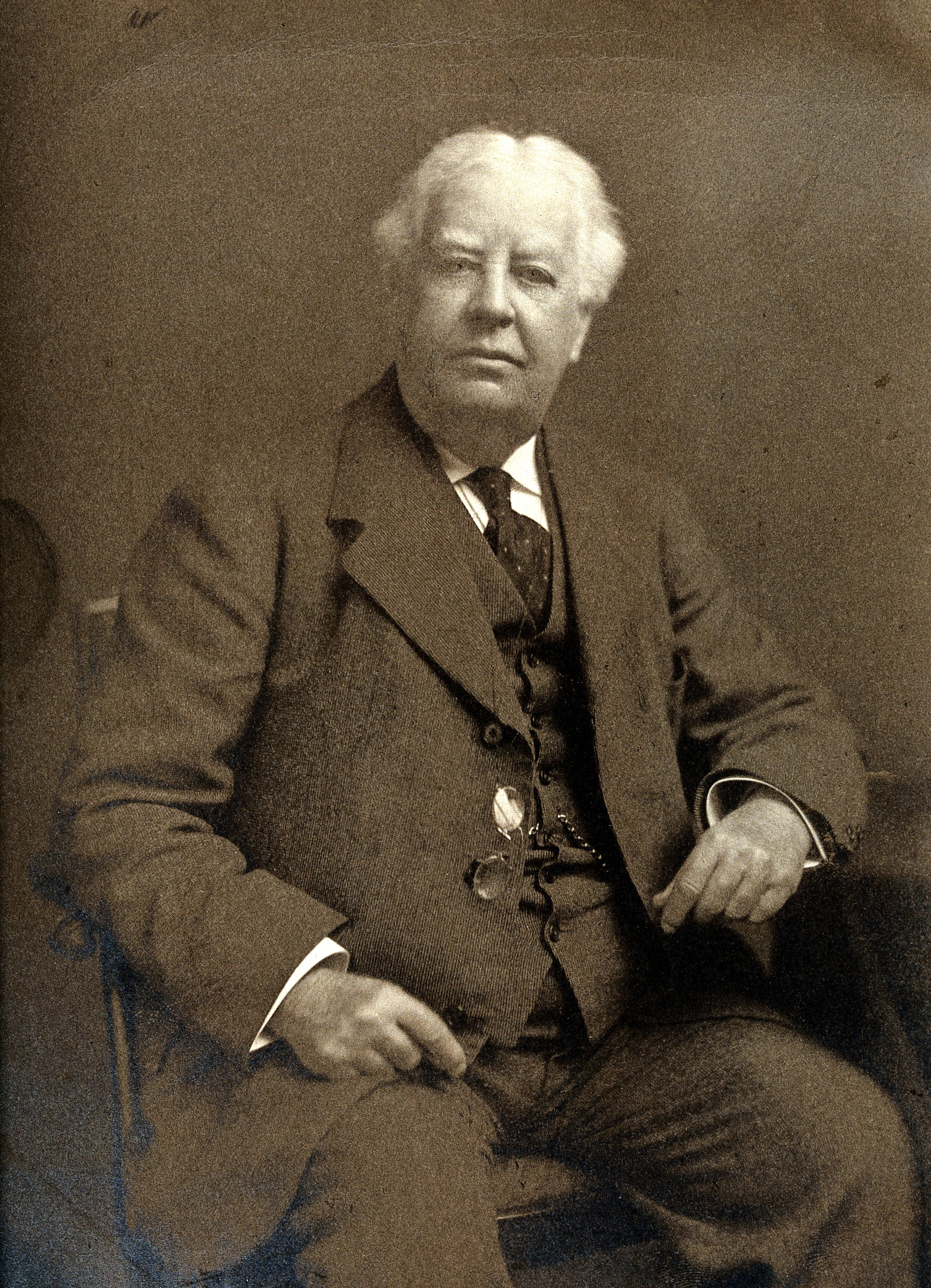
Hector Clare Cameron by Thomas Annan & Sons

Hector Charles Cameron FRCP (17 July 1878, Glasgow – 1 April 1958) was a British physician and paediatrician.

== Biography ==
Hector Charles Cameron, the younger son of Sir Hector Clare Cameron, was known as Charles Cameron. He was educated at Clifton College and then at the University of Glasgow, before he became in 1898 a Foundation Scholar in Science at St John's College, Cambridge. He graduated there B.A. (Nat. Sci. Trip., 1st Class) in 1901 and won a university scholarship to Guy's Hospital.

Qualifying M.R.C.S., L.R.C.P. in 1905, he took the B.Chir. in 1906, the M.B. in 1907, and proceeded to the M.D. in 1910. In 1908 he was elected a Member of the Royal College of Physicians of London, becoming a Fellow of the College six years later.

At Guy's Hospital he held a variety of posts, including demonstrator of physiology, out-patients officer, house-physician, anaesthetist, and medical registrar, before being appointed assistant physician in 1910, medical school sub-dean in 1911, and medical school dean in 1912. In 1920 he chose to become a paediatric specialist instead of appointment as a full physician. For many years he was editor of the Guy's Hospital Gazette.

Cameron delivered the Lumleian Lectures (Some Forms of Vomiting in Infancy) in 1925. He was Chief Medical Officer for the Motor Union and United British Insurance Co. From the University of Glasgow, he received an M.A. in 1906 and an honorary LL.D. in 1956.

His hobby was the study of scientific and medical history, shown in his biographies, particularly those of Lord Lister (1948) and Sir Joseph Banks (1952), and in Mr. Guy's hospital (1954). Up to the time of his last illness he was working on Dr Cecil Wall’s manuscript notes on the history of the Society of Apothecaries. The first volume, covering the period 1617 to 1815 and edited by E. A. Underwood, was published in 1963.

Cameron married in 1908. The marriage produced two daughters.

== Selected publications ==
- Diet and disease in infancy. J. & A. Churchill. 1915.
- The nervous child. Oxford medical publications. H. Frowde; Hodder & Stoughton. 1919.
- Finch, Tamara; Cameron, Hector (1958). The Little King: The book of twenty nights and one night. Sydney, Australia: Angus & Robertson.
