= Duncan Cameron (photographer) =

Canadian photojournalist (1928–1985)

Duncan Cameron (1928–1985) was a Canadian photojournalist. Cameron was born in Glasgow, Scotland, but emigrated to Ottawa, Ontario, Canada in 1954. Cameron owned Capital Press Ltd. and had a contract to photograph events on Parliament Hill for Time Canada, the Canadian edition of Time magazine, as well as for Time Life and Library and Archives Canada. Library and Archives Canada possesses roughly 175,000 of Cameron's works. In his later years Cameron was employed by Library and Archives Canada, helping to obtain negative files from various Canadian photographic operations for the Archives.
