= Hector Clare Cameron =

Scottish surgeon

Sir Hector Clare Cameron
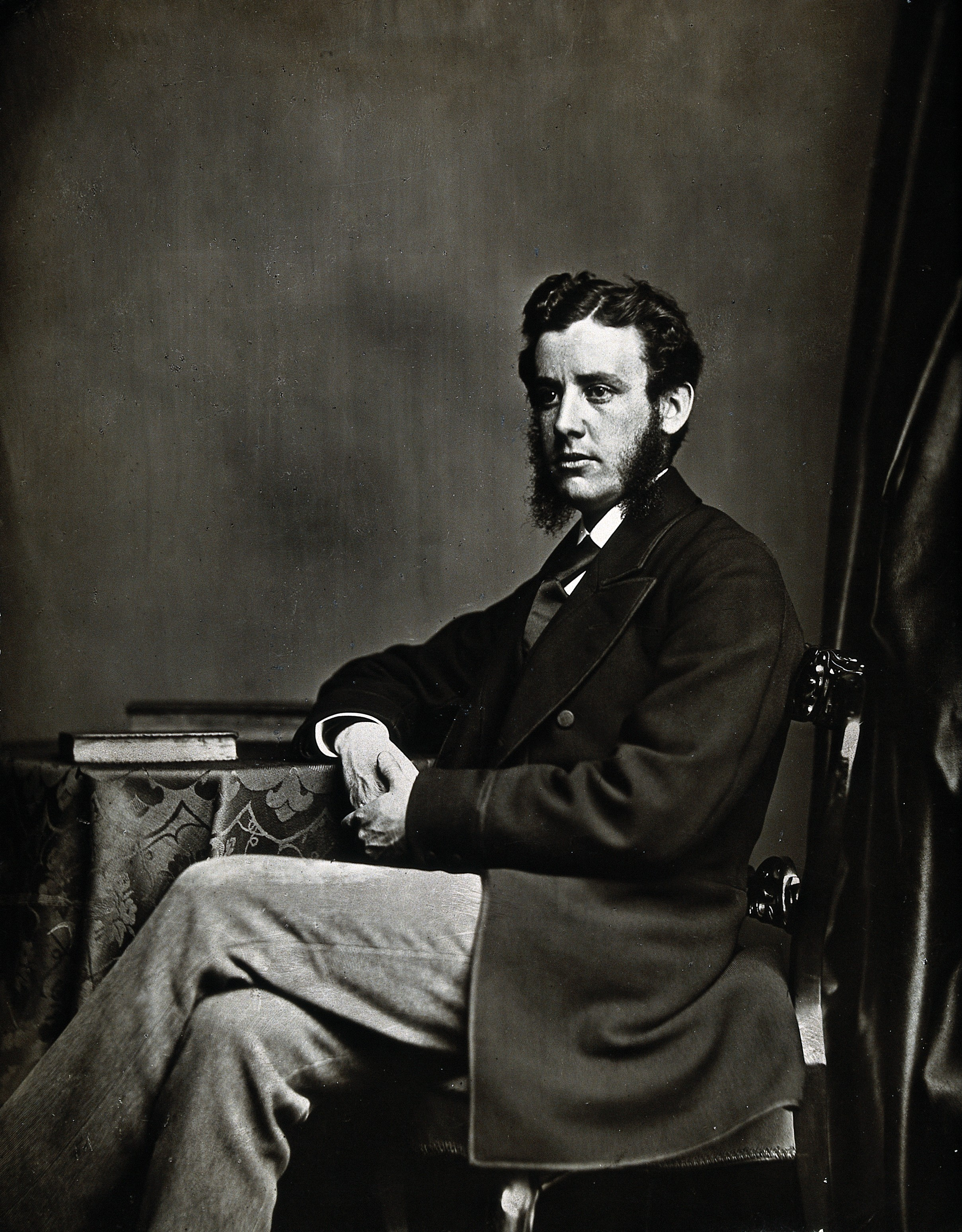
- Portrait photograph of Hector Cameron at his desk, taken in 1870.
- Born: 30 September 1843; Uitvlugt, Demerara, Guyana
- Died: 22 November 1928 (aged 86); Glasgow
- Education: University of St Andrews
- Known for: Promoting the ideas of James Lister
- Awards: CBE, FRFPSGlas
- Scientific career
- Workplaces: University of Glasgow

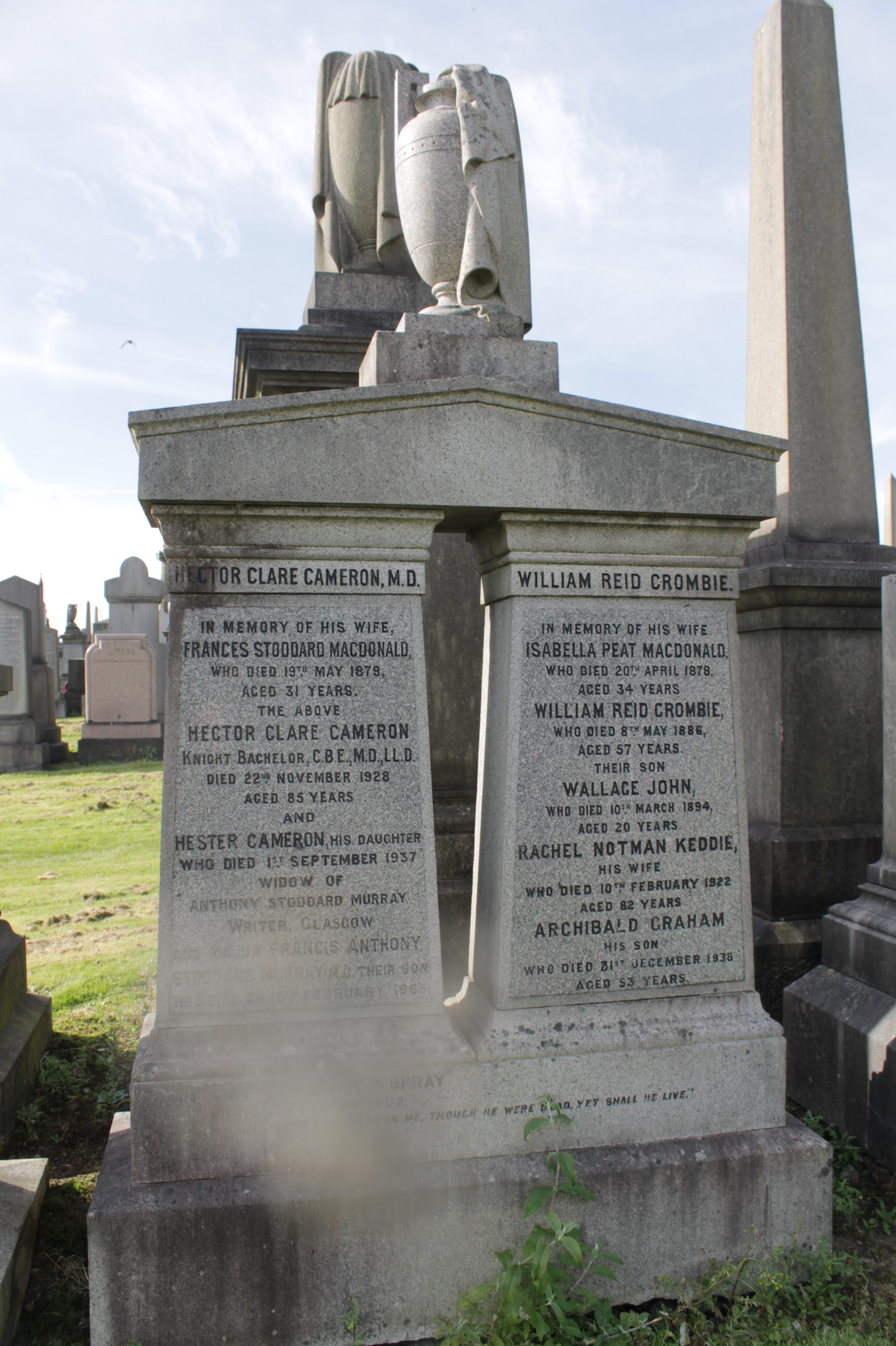
The grave of Hector Clare Cameron, Glasgow Necropolis

Sir Hector Clare Cameron, CBE, FRFPSGlas, JP (born 30 September 1843 in Demerara, British Guiana, died 22 November 1928 in Glasgow) was a surgeon who was most notable for being Emeritus Professor of Clinical Surgery at the University of Glasgow and President of the Faculty of Physicians and Surgeons of Glasgow between 1897 and 1900. Cameron was house-surgeon to Joseph Lister and by 1887 assisted him in private practice. They eventually became life-long friends.

== Life ==
Cameron was the second son of Donald Charles Cameron, who owned a Sugar plantation called Plantation Zeelugt in Uitvlugt, Demerara. Sent home to start his education in Saint Andrews, Cameron took his early education at Madras College. Afterwards, Cameron became a student at the United College University of St Andrews. Cameron moved to the University of Edinburgh to begin his medical training, but it was at the University of Glasgow where he undertook the majority of his training with Sir Joseph Lister, who was a professor of surgery. In 1866 he achieved his Medicine (M.B.) and Surgery (C.M.) qualification and Doctor of Medicine (M.D) in 1868.

He married Frances Stoddard MacDonald in 1872 but she died in 1879 at age 31. The marriage produced two daughters and two sons, the younger of whom was Hector Charles Cameron. On 22 November 1928, Sir Hector Clare Cameron died at his house at 18 Woodside Crescent, Glasgow.

He is buried with his family at the Glasgow Necropolis. The grave lies at the south end of one of the rows at the east side of the upper plateau.

== Career ==
At the University of Glasgow, Cameron studied under the supervision of Lister, to such an extent that he became Lister's house surgeon in 1868, and ultimately his assistant. When Lister moved to the University of Edinburgh in 1869 to take up the Chair of Clinical Surgery, Cameron was offered inducements to move east with Lister, but decided to stay in Glasgow. Cameron by then was fully convinced of Lister's techniques, and became one its leading propagandist's of the young antiseptic school, continuing both its precept and practice of those techniques in Glasgow and the west of Scotland. As Lister's techniques proved themselves, Cameron quickly became recognised as a factor in improved surgical recovery.

Due to this, Cameron was rapidly promoted. In 1873, he became a visiting surgeon at the Glasgow Royal Infirmary. In 1881, Cameron was promoted again, with a move to the Western Infirmary in Glasgow, as a senior visiting surgeon, relinquishing his previous position. In 1900, Cameron was promoted to the Professor in Clinical Surgery at Glasgow University, by the University Court with the passing of Professor George Buchanan who held the first Chair in Clinical Surgery. Cameron held the position until 1910, when he resigned both his professorship and surgical rounds. Cameron held many other positions during his working life. He was a surgeon at the Royal Hospital for Sick Children, Glasgow, consulting surgeon at the Glasgow Royal Asylum, surgeon to the Glasgow Eye Infirmary and the Glasgow Lock hospital. For many years he was a member of the University of Glasgow court, as a representative of the Senate, representing the General Medical Council and the Royal Faculty of Physicians and Surgeons of Glasgow. Cameron was also an examiner at the University of Cambridge and the University of Aberdeen.

In 1892 Cameron retired from hospital. The decision to leave surgery and the clinical chair in 1910 was one of the severest ordeals of his life. In a private letter, he contemplated the move:

In De Quincey Confessions quotes a passage from Dr Johnson and he says it is the only feeling that Dr Johnson ever made. It is this, 'No one does anything consciously for the last time, of those things which he has been long in the habit of doing without sadness of heart. The sentiment is a feeling one, because it is so truly natural and human. When I, therefore, some day soon, realise that I am making my last hospital visit (I have been making for thirty-six years, since 1874) I know I shall feel very sad indeed. The mere anticipation weighs on my spirit'

Glasgow University awarded Hector Cameron an LL.D both in appreciation of his career and recognition of the importance of his work. At his sending off dinner, Cameron received a loving cup in the shape of a quaich with the inscription HCC Magistro carrissimo Discipuli MCMX

During the period before World War I, Cameron continued in private practice, only occasionally operating, and has several civic positions. From 1911, Cameron became a Justice of the peace for the County and City of Glasgow. At the start of World War I, he became a commissioner for the Red Cross Society for the Western District of Scotland, in charge of supervising auxiliary hospitals with almost 2000 beds.

== Society ==
In 1878, Cameron became a fellow of the Royal Faculty of Physicians and Surgeons. From 1997 to 1900 Cameron was President of the Faculty of Physicians and Surgeons of Glasgow, and for 15 years was the Faculty representative to General Medical Council, and whose service was recognised by Queen Victoria by a knighthood.

== Address to the Pathological and Clinical Society of Glasgow ==
On 15 February 1881, Cameron gave an introductory address on being elected President of the Pathological and Clinical Society of Glasgow at Faculty Hall, 242 St Vincents Street, Glasgow.

== James Watson Lectures ==
In February 1906, Cameron held the James Watson Lecture.

== Awards and honours ==
Cameron received several awards, and appreciated them, although he never sought them, they gave pleasure to his friends and patients. Cameron received a brief note that contained a poem from an old Scottish lady, who was a former patient and who wrote to him on the occasion of his Knighthood awarded by Queen Victoria in 1900. The old lady wrote:

Some háe sought it, some háe bought it, you háe wrought it.

In 1918 Cameron's services as commissioner were recognised and he was awarded a Commander of the Order of the British Empire by King George V.
