= Duncan Cameron (shinty player) =

Personal information
- Nationality: British

Sport
- Sport: Shinty
- Club: Ballachulish Camanachd Club

Duncan Cameron is an administrator and ex-player in the sport of shinty. He is a three times past president of the sport's governing body, the Camanachd Association.

== Playing career ==
Cameron was a player for Ballachulish before moving to Glasgow and playing for several clubs in Glasgow.

== Involvement in shinty politics ==
Cameron, alongside his brother Iain, was instrumental in bringing about changes in shinty in the 1970s and early 1980s through public forums and reports.

After holding various positions in the Glasgow Celtic Society, Cameron was elected President of the Camanachd Association in 1994, a position he held until 2000. In this time he brought about the establishment of a National Premier Division and National Division One and was also re-elected.

He was elected in 2007 to succeed John Mackenzie. His third term of presidency was marked by varying levels of controversy. He stepped down in 2011 to be replaced by Archie Robertson.

== Personal life ==
Cameron is married to Liz Cameron, former Lord Provost of Glasgow.
