= Duncan D. Cameron =

British microbiologist

Duncan Drummond Cameron
- Education: University of Sheffield; University of Aberdeen
- Scientific career
- Workplaces: University of Manchester; University of Sheffield; University of Würzburg
- Thesis: A role for differential host resistance to the hemiparasitic angiosperm, Rhinanthus minor L. in determining the structure of host plant communities (2004)

Duncan Drummond Cameron is a British microbiologist and Professor of Environmental Sustainability at the University of Manchester. His research considers multiomics approaches to understand the interactions between soil microbes and plant nutrition. Alongside his research, Cameron works in science policy, and was involved with the 2015 United Nations Climate Change Conference.

== Early life and education ==
Cameron started his academic career at the University of Sheffield, where he studied animal and plant biology. He was a doctoral student at the University of Aberdeen, where he researched the effect of Rhinanthus minor on the structure of the environments it inhabits. Over the course of one growing season, he found that Rhinanthus minor suppresses the growth of grasses and legumes whilst promoting the growth of forbs. Cameron returned to the University of Sheffield as a postdoctoral researcher, before being appointed a Royal Society University Research Fellowship. He worked as a research fellow at the University of Würzburg. In 2023, Cameron and his research group moved to the Manchester Institute of Biotechnology at the University of Manchester.

== Research and career ==
Cameron started his independent academic career at the University of Sheffield, investigating agricultural practise and the movement of nutrients in symbiotic organisms. His research efforts look to inform sustainable approaches to feed growing populations. He makes use of both molecular biology and biochemistry to understand the communication of microbes, and how they exchange resources in symbioses. He leads the UK Research and Innovation H3 (healthy soil, healthy food, healthy people) consortium, a scheme which looks to transform the UK food system.

In 2013 Cameron was Chair of the Royal Society Frontiers of Science meeting. He was the University of California, Riverside Invited Lecturer in 2021.

== Selected publications ==
- William J. Sutherland; Robert P. Freckleton; H. Charles J. Godfray; et al. (21 December 2012). "Identification of 100 fundamental ecological questions". Journal of Ecology. 101 (1): 58–67. doi:10.1111/1365-2745.12025. ISSN 0022-0477. Wikidata Q27967000.
- Duncan D. Cameron; Jonathan R. Leake; David J Read (1 January 2006). "Mutualistic mycorrhiza in orchids: evidence from plant-fungus carbon and nitrogen transfers in the green-leaved terrestrial orchid Goodyera repens". New Phytologist. 171 (2): 405–416. doi:10.1111/j.1469-8137.2006.01767.x. ISSN 0028-646X. PMID 16866946. Wikidata Q34569356.
- Duncan D Cameron; Andrew L Neal; Saskia C M van Wees; Jurriaan Ton (18 July 2013). "Mycorrhiza-induced resistance: more than the sum of its parts?" (PDF). Trends in Plant Science. 18 (10): 539–545. doi:10.1016/j.tplants.2013.06.004. ISSN 1360-1385. PMC 4194313. PMID 23871659. Wikidata Q28654755.

Cameron writes for the website The Conversation.

== Personal life ==
Cameron is gay, and works to improve the visibility of LGBT people.
