= Neil Clephane-Cameron =

- Born: Neil Clephane Cameron; 1960-10-04
- Occupations: Historian, writer, actor
- Children: James Edward (b. 1985)
- Writing career
- Notable works: 1066 and the Battle of Hastings: Preludes, Events and Postscripts

Neil Clephane-Cameron (born Neil Clephane Cameron, 4 October 1960) is a historian, writer and actor from Battle, East Sussex. Much of his work is centred on research into the events of 1066, in particular the Battle of Hastings. He has appeared as a consultant historian in a number of BBC documentaries, and cowrote the nonfiction book The 1066 Malfosse Walk with Joanne Lawrence in 2000. Other periods of particular interest to him are the English Civil War and World War I. Clephane-Cameron has also conducted guided tours, for individuals and groups such as The Battlefields Trust, of battlefields in Britain and Europe including Hastings, 1066; Lewes, 1264; Waterloo, 1815; 1st Ypres, 1914; The Somme, 1916.

== Battle Abbey protests ==
In the late 1990s, Clephane-Cameron initiated and led a successful national protest against alterations proposed by English Heritage to Battle Abbey to include a Tea Rooms and service road on a portion of the historic battlefield.

== The Malfosse Walk ==
In 2000, Clephane-Cameron wrote The 1066 Malfosse Walk, which talks about the closing events of the Battle of Hastings in which the fleeing Saxons briefly stood against a pursuing group of Norman knights and nearly succeeded in killing Duke William. The publication marked the Golden Jubilee of the Battle & District Historical Society, of which he has been the Honorary Secretary since 1995.

== 1066 and the Battle of Hastings ==
In 2015, Clephane-Cameron joined with Keith Foord to publish a collection of essays on the preludes, events, and postscripts of the Battle of Hastings. The book was subtitled "Essays from the Battlefield".

== Consultant historian ==
Clephane-Cameron has acted as a consultant historian for the BBC and independent production companies. Television programmes include Dan Snow's Norman Walks, which looked at the spread of the Normans after the events of 1066, and for radio a variety of documentaries including the history of Winchelsea as well a various news items.

== Film work ==
Clephane-Cameron appeared in the BBC production of Henry V released in 2012 as part of their cycle of Shakespeare films. He can be seen in the role of an English archer.
