= Duncan Inglis Cameron =

Scottish university administrator

Duncan Inglis Cameron OBE (26 August 1927 – 7 May 2006) was a university administrator and Secretary of Heriot-Watt University, Edinburgh.

== Early life ==
Born in Glasgow, he attended the academically rigorous Glasgow High School, and then went on to study law at the University of Glasgow. During the years 1945 - 1948, he performed his national service flying with the RAF, after which he began his administrative career as a Chartered Accountant's apprentice with Alfred Tongue & Co. In 1951 he progressed to become a qualified assistant with Cooper Bros & Co.

Cameron's first step into working within a university came in 1952, when he was appointed an assistant accountant of the University of Edinburgh remaining there for 13 years. In 1965 he took up the position of Secretary at the, then new, Heriot-Watt University.

== University Secretary of Heriot-Watt ==
Heriot Watt University gained its royal charter in 1967 and became one of the UK's new technological universities. Cameron served as the university's Secretary for 25 years until his retirement in 1992. During this time, he worked with five principals, two acting principals, four chairmen of court and two chancellors.

Cameron's legacies at the university include:

- In 1967, initiating one of the first chairs in accountancy and finance, an innovative approach for training graduate-level accountants.
- Between 1969 and 1992, he played a key role in the transfer of Heriot-Watt's campus from its city location to a new campus at Riccarton, an ambitious and successful plan involving negotiations with the University Grants Committee.
- developing strategies for the transfer of technology and techniques into industry, resulting in entities such as Unilink, the pioneering industrial liaison unit, dedicated technology transfer units including the Institute of Offshore Engineering, Computer Applications Services, the Medical Laser Unit, the Marine Science Unit and the opening of the first UK university research park in 1971.
- Heriot-Watt's reputation as 'Norway's University in Scotland' was largely due to Cameron's work in establishing links with Norway. He was later recognised for his achievements by the King of Norway.
- From 1967 to 1990, he represented Heriot-Watt's interests on the Universities Central Council on Admissions.

== Achievements outside work ==
Cameron contributed much to society outside of his work with Heriot-Watt. His work to strengthen Scotland's historical links with Norway were honoured with the Royal Norwegian Order of St. Olav, awarded by the King Olav V in 1979. He was also an active member of the Norwegian Scottish Association. He served as Justice of the Peace for several decades and was a highly respected session clerk of St Ninian's Church in Corstorphine, Edinburgh.

From 1983 to 1988 he served as chairman of the Royal Scottish Geographical Society and from 1989, became an honorary fellow. In the 1991 New Year Honours he was awarded an OBE by the Queen and the following year, in 1991, the honorary degree of Doctor of the University was conferred on him by Heriot-Watt University. His obituary was published in The Scotsman on Tuesday 6 June 2006.
