= Duncan (given name) =

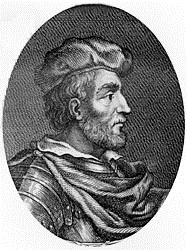
- Depiction of Duncan I of Scotland
- Pronunciation: /ˈdʌŋˈkən/
- Gender: Male

Origin
- Meaning: Chief
- Region of origin: Ireland

Other names
- Nickname: Dunc
- Related names: Donnchadh, Donncha, Donagh
- Given name of Scottish origin.

Duncan is an Anglicised form of Irish Donnchadh. One of the first people to bear the name was king of Dál Riata Dúnchad mac Dubáin, who was possibly the grandfather of Fiannamail ua Dúnchado-Fiannamail O'Dúnchado. The final letter n in the Anglicised Duncan seems to be a result of confusion in the Latin form of the name—Duncanus—with the Gaelic word ceann, meaning "head". One opinion is that the Gaelic Donnchadh is composed of the elements donn, meaning "dark or dark-haired man" or "chieftain"; and cath, meaning "battle", together meaning "dark-haired or dark warrior". Another opinion is that the Gaelic Donnchadh is composed of the elements donn, meaning "brown"; and chadh, meaning "chief" or "noble".

== Variations ==
Old Irish	Modern Irish	Hiberno-English	Scottish Gaelic	Scottish English
Donnchadh	Donncha	Donagh	Donnchadh	Duncan

== Notable people ==
=== A ===
- Duncan Aldred (born 1970), British businessman
- Duncan Alexander (born 2000), English podcaster
- Duncan Orestes Alguire (1853–1925), Canadian politician
- Duncan Allan (born 1991), Kenyan cricketer
- Duncan Anderson (1931–1996), Australian rules footballer and cricketer
- Duncan Stewart of Ardsheal (1732–1793), 10th Chief of the Clan Stewart of Appin
- Duncan Armstrong (born 1968), Australian swimmer
- Duncan Arnolda (born 1975), Sri Lankan cricketer
- Duncan Arsenault (born 1974), American musician
- Duncan Atwood (born 1955), American javelin thrower

=== B ===
- Duncan Baillie (1826–1890), Scottish cricketer and British Army officer
- Duncan Baird (born 1979), American politician
- Duncan Baker (born 1979), British Conservative politician
- Duncan Ball (born 1941), American-born Australian author
- Duncan Bannatyne (born 1949), Scottish entrepreneur, philanthropist and author
- Duncan Barber (born 1945), Welsh businessman, RAF ambassador
- Duncan Barkes, British broadcaster, columnist, and journalist
- Duncan Barrett (born 1983), British writer and historian
- Duncan Beattie (born 1929), Canadian politician
- Duncan Bell (actor) (born 1955), Scottish actor
- Duncan Bell (historian) (born 1976), British academic
- Duncan Bell (rugby union) (born 1974), England international rugby union player
- Duncan Birmingham, American writer
- Duncan Black (1908–1991), Scottish economist
- Duncan Blaikie (born 1975), Rugby player
- Duncan M. Blair (1896–1944), Scottish anatomist
- Duncan Bluck (1927–2015), British businessman
- Duncan Botwood (born 1972), British voice actor and video game designer
- Duncan Bowett (born 1971), Australian-born English cricketer
- Duncan Gordon Boyes (1846–1869), English Victoria Cross recipient
- Duncan Bradshaw (born 1986), English cricketer
- Duncan Brannan (born 1970), American voice actor
- Duncan Bridge (born 1958), English badminton player
- Duncan Brinsmead (born 1960), Canadian software programmer
- Duncan Brown (cricketer) (born 1972), South African cricketer
- Duncan A. Brown (born 1976), American physicist
- Duncan Browne (1947–1993), English singer-songwriter
- Duncan Archibald Bruce (1932–2019), American novelist
- Duncan Buchanan (1935–2012), South African Anglican bishop
- Duncan Burns (born 2000), British wrestler
- Duncan Burton, British nurse administrator
- Duncan Busby (born 1983), English archer
- Duncan Bush (1946–2017), British poet
- Duncan Buyskes (1912–1994), South African cricketer

=== C ===
- Duncan Cage (died 1885), American politician
- Duncan Cameron (British Army officer) (1808–1888), British Army general
- Duncan Cameron (Conservative MLA) (1863–1942), Canadian politician
- Duncan Cameron (fur trader) (1764–1848), Canadian politician
- Duncan Cameron (Liberal MLA) (1865–1948), Canadian politician
- Duncan Cameron (photographer) (1928–1985), Canadian photojournalist
- Duncan Cameron (Scottish inventor) (1825–1901), Scottish businessman
- Duncan Cameron (shinty player), 1994-2011 president of the Camanachd Association
- Duncan D. Cameron, British microbiologist
- Duncan Inglis Cameron (1927–2006), Scottish university administrator
- Duncan Campbell (artist) (born 1972), Irish video artist
- Duncan Campbell (British Army officer, died 1837) (1763–1837), British Army officer and politician
- Duncan Campbell (died 1758), British Army officer
- Duncan Campbell (inventor) (born 1955), Canadian co-inventor of murderball
- Duncan Campbell (journalist, born 1944) (1944–2025), British journalist and author
- Duncan Campbell (journalist, born 1952) (born 1952), British investigative journalist
- Duncan Campbell (revivalist) (1898–1972), Scottish evangelist
- Duncan Campbell (settler) (1781–1856), British settler in South Africa
- Duncan Campbell (snooker player) (born 1966), Scottish snooker player
- Duncan Campbell (snowboarder) (born 1997), New Zealand snowboarder
- Duncan Campbell (soothsayer) (1680–1730), Scottish soothsayer
- Duncan Campbell (trumpeter) (1926–2013), British trumpeter
- Duncan Campbell (Unionist politician) (1876–1916), British politician
- Duncan B. Campbell (born 1950), British scholar
- Duncan Campbell, 1st Lord Campbell (1390–1453), 15th-century Scottish nobleman and politician
- Duncan J. Campbell (1845–1882), Canadian politician
- Duncan Candler (1873–1949), American architect
- Duncan Capps (born 1966), Retired British Army general
- Duncan Carmichael (born 1870), British trade unionist and socialist activist
- Duncan Carmichael (cricketer) (1915–1984), English cricketer
- Duncan Carse (1913–2004), English explorer and actor
- Duncan Carter (1939–2008), Barbadian cricketer
- Duncan Casey (born 1990), Irish rugby union player
- Duncan S. Casper (1824–1898), American Mormon pioneer
- Duncan Catterall (born 1978), English cricketer
- Duncan Cederman (born 1978), New Zealand cricketer
- Duncan Chapman (1888–1916), Australian Army officer
- Duncan Mackintosh, 31st Chattan (1884–1966), British military personnel
- Duncan Cheatle, British businessman
- Duncan Chessell (born 1970), Australian geologist
- Duncan Chisholm (born 1968), Musical artist
- Duncan Chiu (born 1974), Hong Kong politician
- Duncan Chow (born 1978), Hong kong actor
- Duncan Clark (athlete) (1915–2003), Scottish hammer thrower
- Duncan Clark (surgeon) (1759–1808), loyalist in Halifax, Nova Scotia
- Duncan W. Clark (1910–2007), American health specialist
- Duncan Cleworth (born 1957), British swimmer
- Duncan Lamont Clinch (1787–1849), American politician
- Duncan Cole (1958–2014), New Zealand footballer
- Duncan McNeill, 1st Baron Colonsay (1793–1874), Scottish advocate, judge and Tory politician
- Duncan Colquhoun (1915–2005), Scottish association football player
- Duncan Convers (1851–1929), American priest and author
- Duncan Cooper (cricketer) (1813–1904), Indian-born Australian cricketer
- Duncan Cooper (footballer) (1880–1951), English footballer
- Duncan Brown Cooper (1844–1922), American journalist, publisher, politician
- Duncan Coutts (born 1969), Canadian musician
- Duncan Crabtree-Ireland (born 1970s), American business executive
- Duncan Cramer (1901–1980), American cinematic art director
- Duncan MacGregor Crerar (1836-1916), Scottish poet
- Duncan Crowie (born 1963), South African soccer player
- Duncan Forbes, 3rd of Culloden (1644–1704), Scottish politician
- Duncan Forbes, 5th of Culloden (1685–1747), Scottish judge and politician
- Duncan Cumming (1903–1979), British soldier and colonial administrator
- Duncan Cummings (born 1958), Australian soccer player
- Duncan Currie (1892–1916), Scottish footballer
- Duncan Curry (1812–1894), American baseball pioneer and businessman

=== D ===
- Duncan Dalmao (born 1978), Canadian ice hockey player
- Duncan Daniels (born 1983), American singer, songwriter
- Duncan Davidson (businessman) (1941–2025), British businessman
- Duncan Davidson (Cromartyshire MP, born 1733) (1733–1799), British politician
- Duncan Davidson (Cromartyshire MP, born 1800) (1800–1881), British politician
- Duncan Davidson (footballer) (born 1954), Scottish footballer
- Duncan Davitt (born 1999), American baseball player
- Duncan Dawkins, English weightlifter
- Duncan Dayton (born 1959), American racing driver
- Duncan R. Derry (1906–1987), English-born Canadian geologist
- Duncan Dokiwari (born 1973), Nigerian boxer
- Duncan Dormor (born 1967), British Anglican priest
- Duncan Douglas (born 1965), American biathlete
- Duncan Dowson (1928–2020), British engineer
- Duncan Drew (born 1976), New Zealand cricketer
- Duncan Druce (1939–2015), English composer, string player and musicologist
- Duncan Drummond (1923-1985), Scottish cricketer and businessman
- Duncan Duff (born 1964), Scottish actor
- Duncan Dunbar (brewer) (c.1764–1825), Scottish brewer and wine merchant
- Duncan Dunbar (shipowner) (1803–1862), Scottish shipowner
- Duncan Dunlop, Scottish politician

=== E ===
- Duncan Eagles (born 1985), English musical artist
- Duncan Eagleson, American comic book artist
- Duncan Edmonds (1936–2019), Canadian businessman and politician
- Duncan Edwards (1936–1958), English footballer
- Duncan David Elias (born 1985), Singaporean footballer
- Duncan Elliot (1862–1919), American banker and soldier
- Duncan Ellis (1930–2020), Canadian football player
- Duncan Ende (born 1985), American racing driver
- Duncan Evans (born 1959), Welsh golfer

=== F ===
- Duncan Falconer (born 1956), British author and Special Boat Service commando
- Duncan Fallowell (born 1948), English novelist, travel writer and critic
- Duncan Faure (born 1956), South African singer
- Duncan Fearnley (1940–2024), English cricketer
- Duncan Fegredo (born 1964), British comic book artist
- Duncan Ferguson (born 1971), Scottish football manager and former player
- Duncan Ferguson (political activist) (1901–1974), American sculptor and activist
- Duncan Fernie (born 1978), Scottish curler
- Duncan Finlayson (1867–1925), Canadian politician
- Duncan Finlayson (governor of Assiniboia), Canadian politician
- Duncan Fisher (1962–1984), Australian rower
- Duncan Fletcher (born 1948), Zimbabwean cricket coach
- Duncan U. Fletcher (1859–1936), American politician
- Duncan K. Foley (born 1942), American economist
- Duncan Forbes (footballer) (1941–2019), Scottish footballer
- Duncan Forbes (historian) (1922–1994), Scottish historian
- Duncan Forbes (linguist) (1798–1868), Scottish linguist
- Duncan Forbes (poet) (born 1947), British poet
- Duncan Forbes (Royal Marines officer), British Royal Marines officer
- Duncan Forestar, Scottish courtier and financial administrator
- Duncan B. Forrester (1933–2016), Scottish theologian
- Duncan Fowles (born 1893), Rugby player
- Duncan Fraser (actor), Canadian actor
- Duncan Fraser (moderator) (1903–1977), Moderator of the General Assembly of the Church of Scotland
- Duncan Cameron Fraser (1845–1910), Canadian politician
- Duncan Free (born 1973), Australian rower
- Duncan McArthur Funk (1832–1911), American politician

=== G ===
- Duncan Garner (born 1974), New Zealand right-wing TV personality and journalist
- Duncan Gay (born 1950), Australian politician
- Duncan Gibbins (1952–1993), British film and music video director
- Duncan Gifford (born 1972), Australian concert pianist
- Duncan Gillies (1834–1903), Australian politician
- Duncan Gillis (1883–1963), Canadian athlete
- Duncan Glasfurd (1873–1916), British Army general
- Duncan Glen (1933–2008), Scottish poet and academic
- Duncan Campbell of Glenorchy (1545–1631), Scottish landowner and courtier
- Duncan Goldfinch (1888–1960), Australian painter
- Duncan Goodhew (born 1957), English swimmer
- Duncan Graham (British politician) (1867–1942), British politician
- Duncan Graham (Canadian politician) (1845–1934), Canadian politician
- Duncan Graham (writer) (born 1938), Australian-trained journalist and blogger
- Duncan Archibald Graham (1882–1974), Canadian physician and academic
- Duncan Grant (1885–1978), Scottish painter and designer
- Duncan Grant (rower) (born 1980), New Zealand rower
- Duncan Green (aid expert), Development specialist
- Duncan Green (British Army officer) (1925–2019), Indian Army officer
- Duncan Green (priest) (born 1952), British priest
- Duncan Greenlees (1899–1966), British writer and theosophist
- Duncan Greenwood (1919–1992), English playwright
- Duncan Joseph Greenwood (1932–2010), British plant and agricultural scientist
- Duncan Gregg (1910–1989), American rower
- Duncan Gregory (1813–1844), Scottish mathematician
- Duncan Greive (born 1980), New Zealand magazine editor
- Duncan Grinnell-Milne (1896–1973), English First World War pilot and POW
- Duncan Grob (born 1980), Chilean alpine skier

=== H ===
- Duncan van Haaren, Dutch Paralympic swimmer
- Duncan Haldane (born 1951), British physicist
- Duncan Hales (1947–2024), New Zealand international rugby union player
- Duncan Hall (1925–2011), Australian international rugby league footballer
- Duncan Hallas (1925–2002), British politician
- Duncan Hames (born 1977), British Former Liberal Democrat politician
- Duncan Hamilton (journalist) (born 1958), British author and journalist
- Duncan Hamilton (politician) (born 1973), Scottish lawyer and politician
- Duncan Hamilton (racing driver) (1920-1994), British racing driver
- Duncan Hamilton (runner) (born 2000), American track and field athlete
- Duncan Hannah (1952–2022), American visual artist and author
- Duncan Harrigan (1921–2005), Scottish footballer
- Duncan Harris (born 1941), Australian rules footballer
- Duncan Harvey (bobsleigh) (born 1981), Australian bobsledder
- Duncan Harvey (British Army officer) (1882–1957), Ireland international rugby union player
- Duncan Hawthorne, British businessman
- Duncan Heath (born 1946), British talent agent
- Duncan Heath (cricketer) (born 1981), English cricketer
- Duncan Henderson (1949–2022), American film producer
- Duncan Hendry (1951–2023), Theatre executive
- Duncan Clinch Heyward (1864–1943), American politician
- Duncan Hines (1880–1959), American businessman, writer, food critic
- Duncan Hodge (born 1974), Scottish international rugby union player & coach
- Duncan Hollis (born 1970), American legal scholar
- Duncan Home (1828–1857), Recipient of the Victoria Cross
- Duncan Honeybourne (born 1977), Musical artist
- Duncan Hooper (1912–1990), British/Australian journalist
- Duncan Hopkins (born 1967), British composer
- Duncan Horton (born 1967), English footballer
- Duncan Huisman (born 1971), Dutch racing driver
- Duncan D. Hunter (born 1976), American politician
- Duncan L. Hunter (born 1948), American politician
- Duncan Selby Hutcheon (1879–1954), Canadian politician
- Duncan Hutchison (1904–1973), Scottish footballer

=== I ===
- Duncan Idehen (born 2002), English footballer
- Duncan Montgomery Gray III, Episcopal bishop
- Duncan Ingraham (1802–1891), American Navy officer
- Duncan Innes (born 2000), British rower
- Duncan Ironmonger (1931–2024), Australian economist
- Duncan Irschick (born 1969), American evolutionary ecologist
- Duncan Irvine (1851–1914), Scottish international rugby union player
- Duncan Ivison (born 1965), Political scientist and academic

=== J ===
- Duncan James (born 1978), English singer and actor
- Duncan James (Australian singer), Musical artist
- Duncan Airlie James (born 1961), Scottish kickboxer and actor
- Duncan Jarman (born 2000), British makeup artist
- Duncan Jepson, British solicitor
- Duncan Jessiman (1923–2006), Canadian politician
- Duncan Johnson (actor), South African actor and presenter
- Duncan Johnson (DJ) (1938–2018), Canadian radio jockey
- Duncan Johnston (1847–1931), Scottish Royal Engineers officer
- Duncan Johnston (songwriter) (1881–1947), Scottish songwriter
- Duncan Johnstone (1925–1999), Scottish musician
- Duncan Jones (born 1971), British director, producer, screenwriter
- Duncan Jones (rugby union) (born 1978), Wales international rugby union footballer
- Duncan Hall Jr. (born 1956), Australian international rugby union player
- Duncan M. Gray Jr. (1926–2016), American bishop
- Duncan McMartin Jr. (1776–1837), American politician
- Duncan Mackellar, Junior (1795–1838), Australian Royal Navy officer
- Duncan Jupp (born 1975), English footballer

=== K ===
- Duncan Keith (born 1983), Canadian ice hockey player
- Duncan Kellaway (born 1973), Australian rules footballer
- Duncan Kelm (born 1988), US international rugby union player
- Duncan Kennedy (legal philosopher) (born 1942), American legal scholar
- Duncan Kennedy (luger) (born 1967), American luger
- Duncan F. Kenner (1813–1887), American politician
- Duncan Kenworthy (born 1949), British film and television producer
- Duncan de Kergommeaux (1927–2024), Canadian artist
- Duncan Kerr (born 1952), Australian politician
- Duncan Kgopolelo (born 1974), Motswana footballer
- Duncan Kibet (born 1978), Kenyan long-distance runner
- Duncan F. Kilmartin (born 1942), American politician
- Duncan Koech (born 1981), Kenyan long-distance runner
- Duncan Kyle (1930–2000), English thriller writer

=== L ===
- Duncan Laing (1933–2008), New Zealand swimming coach
- Duncan Lambie (1952–2015), Scottish footballer
- Duncan Lamont (1918–1978), British actor
- Duncan Lamont (musician) (1931–2019), British saxophonist
- Duncan Laurence (born 1994), Dutch singer
- Duncan Lawson, British mathematician
- Duncan Lechesa (born 1976), South African soccer player and coach
- Duncan Lee (1913–1988), American assistant and spy
- Duncan Leitch (geologist) (1904–1956), Scottish geologist and palaeontologist
- Duncan Leitch (minister) (1903–1974), Scottish minister
- Duncan Leitch (neurobiologist) (born 1984), American neurobiologist
- Duncan Lewin (1912–1983), Royal Navy aviator
- Duncan Lewis (born 1953), Australian military officer
- Duncan Ley, Australian playwright and actor
- Duncan Liddel (1561–1613), Scottish mathematician, physician and astronomer
- Duncan Lindsay (Scottish footballer) (1903–1972), Scottish footballer
- Duncan Lindsay (Australian footballer) (1902–1967), Australian rules footballer
- Duncan Livingstone (1877–1964), Scottish poet
- Duncan Lloyd (born 1977), English musician
- Duncan Longden (1826–1904), Australian politician
- Duncan Lorimer (born 1969), Astrophysicist
- Duncan Lunan (born 1945), Scottish writer

=== M ===
- Duncan MacArthur (Manitoba politician) (1840–1907), Canadian politician
- Duncan MacArthur (Ontario politician), Canadian politician
- Duncan MacDonald (athlete) (born 1949), American long-distance runner
- Duncan MacDonald (politician) (1885–1977), Australian politician
- Duncan Black MacDonald (1863–1943), American orientalist
- Duncan MacDougall (British Army officer) (1787–1862), British Army officer
- Duncan MacDougall (doctor) (1866–1920), American physician
- Duncan MacDowall (born 1963), English footballer
- Duncan MacEwan (born 1958), Scottish footballer
- Duncan Macfarlan (1771–1857), Scottish minister
- Duncan Macfarlane (1827–1903), New Zealand merchant and magistrate
- Duncan Alwyn Macfarlane (1857–1941), British Army general
- Duncan MacGillivray (born 1976), Scottish international rugby league footballer
- Duncan MacGregor (academic) (1843–1906), Scottish academic & administrator
- Duncan MacGregor (footballer) (born 1952), Australian rules footballer
- Duncan MacGregor (rugby union), Scottish international rugby union player
- Duncan MacInnes (1897–1970), Scottish Anglican bishop
- Duncan A. MacInnes (1885–1965), American chemist
- Duncan Sayre MacInnes (1860–1918), British Army general
- Duncan Macintosh (1904–1966), British police officer
- Duncan MacIntyre (New Zealand politician) (1915–2001), New Zealand politician
- Duncan Ban MacIntyre (1724–1812), Scottish Gaelic poet
- Duncan MacKay (footballer) (1937–2019), Scottish footballer and manager
- Duncan Mackay (musician) (born 1950), British musician and composer
- Duncan Mackellar (born c. 1789), Scottish-born colonial settler
- Duncan Mackenzie (1861–1934), Scottish archaeologist
- Duncan MacKinnon (born 1970), South African judoka
- Duncan Mackinnon (1887–1917), British rower
- Duncan Mackintosh (died c. 1689), 17th-century pirate
- Duncan Mackintosh, 11th of Mackintosh, Scottish clan chief (died 1496)
- Duncan MacLeod (footballer) (born 1949), Scottish footballer
- Duncan MacLeod (rugby union) (1866–1907), Scottish international rugby union player
- Duncan MacMillan (Alberta politician) (1887–1962), Canadian politician
- Duncan Macmillan (art historian) (born 1939), Scottish art historian
- Duncan Macmillan (athlete) (1890–1963), British sprinter
- Duncan MacMillan (businessman), American mathematician, philanthropist and businessman
- Duncan MacMillan (Nova Scotia politician) (1897–1969), Nova Scotia politician
- Duncan Macmillan (Canadian politician) (1837–1903), Canadian politician
- Duncan Macmillan (playwright) (born 1980), English playwright and theatre director
- Duncan MacNaughton (1892–1973), Scottish lawyer and astronomer
- Duncan MacPherson (1966–1989), Canadian ice hockey player
- Duncan Macpherson (1924–1993), Canadian editorial cartoonist
- Duncan Macpherson (photographer) (1882–1966), Scottish photographer
- Duncan Macrae (actor) (1905–1967), Scottish actor
- Duncan MacRae (rugby league) (1934–2019), New Zealand rugby league footballer
- Duncan Macrae (rugby union) (1914–2007), British rugby union player
- Duncan Kenneth MacTavish (1899–1963), Canadian politician
- Duncan Madsen, Scottish international rugby union player
- Duncan Maguire (born 1989), Canada international rugby union player
- Duncan Mahlangu (born 1983), South African taekwondo practitioner
- Duncan Mansfield (born 1778), United States Marine
- Duncan Marshall (1872–1946), Canadian politician
- Duncan M. Martin (1854–1934), American educator and college football coach
- Duncan Martindale (born 1963), English cricketer
- Duncan Maskell (born 1961), British biochemist and academic
- Duncan Massey, Scottish politician
- Duncan Matthews (rugby union) (born 1994), South African rugby union player
- Duncan Maxwell (1892–1969), Australian brigadier
- Duncan Hamilton McAlister (1872–1932), Canadian politician
- Duncan McArthur (1772–1839), American politician
- Duncan McArthur (Canadian politician) (1885–1943), Canadian politician
- Duncan McBryde (1853–1920), Australian businessman and politician
- Duncan McCall (1769–1832), Canadian politician
- Duncan McCallum (1888–1958), Scottish Unionist Party politician
- Duncan McCargo (born 1963), British academic
- Duncan McClure (1913–1991), Scottish footballer
- Duncan McColl, American pastor and former professional footballer
- Duncan Fletcher McCuaig (1889–1950), Canadian politician
- Duncan John McCuaig (1882–1960), Canadian politician and farmer
- Duncan McCue (born 1971), CBC radio and television personality
- Duncan McCulloch (1893–1968), Scottish golfer
- Duncan McDonald (electrical engineer) (1921–1997), Scottish engineer and businessman
- Duncan McDonald (English footballer), English footballer
- Duncan McDonald (politician) (1839–1903), Canadian politician
- Duncan McDonald (Scottish footballer), Scottish footballer
- Duncan McDougall (fur trader) (died 1818), Scottish-Canadian fur trader
- Duncan McDougall (rower) (born 1959), British rower
- Duncan McDowell (born 1947), Scottish football manager
- Duncan McDuffie (1877–1951), American architect
- Duncan McNab McEachran (1841–1924), Canadian academic
- Duncan Stewart McEachran (1826–1913), Australian Presbyterian minister
- Duncan McFadzean (born 1999), Scottish curler
- Duncan McFarlan (1800–1816), American politician
- Duncan McFarlane (1841–1918), Scottish-born New Zealand politician
- Duncan McFetridge (born 1952), Australian politician
- Duncan McGillivray (1770–1808), Scottish fur trader in Canada
- Duncan McGregor (1881–1947), NZ dual-code rugby international footballer
- Duncan McGregor (politician) (1836–1921), American politician
- Duncan McGuire (musician) (1943–1989), Australian musician
- Duncan McGuire (soccer) (born 2001), American soccer player
- Duncan McIntyre (businessman) (1834–1894), Scots-Quebecer businessman
- Duncan McIntyre (explorer) (1831–1866), Australian explorer
- Duncan A. McIntyre, American aviation pioneer
- Duncan John McIntyre (1841–1920), Canadian politician
- Duncan McIvor (1884–1930), Australian rules footballer
- Duncan McKay (TV presenter), British TV Presenter
- Duncan McKechnie (1831–1913), Scottish company founder
- Duncan McKenzie (born 1950), English footballer
- Duncan McKenzie (footballer, born 1912) (1912–1987), Scottish footballer
- Duncan McKenzie (murderer) (1951–1995), American murderer
- Duncan McKenzie (writer) (born 1960), Canadian TV writer and producer
- Duncan E. McKinlay (1862–1914), American politician
- Duncan McLachlan (cricketer) (1893–1958), New Zealand cricketer
- Duncan McLaren (1800–1886), Scottish politician
- Duncan McLaren (author) (born 1957), British writer
- Duncan McLean (footballer, born 1868) (1868–1941), Scottish footballer
- Duncan McLean (footballer, born 1874) (1874–1965), Scottish footballer
- Duncan McLean (rugby union) (1923–1962), Scottish international rugby union player
- Duncan McLean (writer) (born 1964), Scottish writer
- Duncan McLennan (1861–1946), Australian politician
- Duncan Lloyd McLeod (1874–1935), Canadian politician
- Duncan Stuart McLeod (1854–1933), Canadian politician
- Duncan McMeekin (born 1955), Australian judge
- Duncan McMillan (footballer) (1922–1992), Scottish footballer
- Duncan McMillan (linguist) (1914–1993), British linguist
- Duncan McMullin (1927–2017), New Zealand judge
- Duncan McNab (1820–1896), Australian Catholic missionary
- Duncan McNabb (born 1952), US Air Force general
- Duncan McNair (born 1947), British litigation lawyer
- Duncan McNaught (1845–1925), Scottish parochial school teacher
- Duncan McNaughton (1910–1998), Canadian athlete
- Duncan Alexander McNaughton (1877–1962), Canadian politician
- Duncan McNeil (born 1950), British politician
- Duncan McNicol (1876–1949), Scottish footballer
- Duncan McPhee (1892–1950), British middle-distance runner
- Duncan McRae (actor) (1873–1931), British actor and director
- Duncan McRae (designer) (1919–1984), American industrial designer
- Duncan McRae (politician) (1823–1879), Canadian politician
- Duncan McRae (rugby) (born 1974), Australian rugby league footballer
- Duncan K. McRae (1820–1888), American politician
- Duncan McTier, English double-bassist
- Duncan McVey (1938–2010), New Zealand footballer
- Duncan Mearns (1779–1852), Scottish minister
- Duncan A. Mellichamp, American chemical engineer
- Duncan Menzies (architect) (born 1837), Scottish architect and civil engineer
- Duncan Menzies (curler) (born 1994), Scottish curler
- Duncan Menzies, Lord Menzies (born 1953), Scottish judge
- Duncan Mercredi, Cree writer based in Winnipeg, Manitoba
- Duncan Merrilees (1922–2009), Australian paleontologist and archaeologist
- Duncan Mighty (born 1983), Nigerian musician
- Duncan Millar (musician) (died 2022), British composer and songwriter
- Duncan Millar (VC) (1824–1881), Recipient of the Victoria Cross
- Duncan Milroy (born 1983), Canadian ice hockey player
- Duncan Moodie (1897–1960), Australian rules footballer
- Duncan T. Moore (born 1946), American physicist
- Duncan Mugabe (born 1990), Ugandan tennis player
- Duncan Munn (born 2003), Scottish rugby union player
- Duncan Paul Munro (1896–1934), Canadian politician

=== N ===
- Duncan Na'awi (born 1978), PNG international rugby league footballer
- Duncan Napier (1831–1921), Scottish botanist
- Duncan Napier (cricketer) (1871–1953), Scottish cricketer and British Army officer
- Duncan Ndegwa (born 1925), Kenyan civil servant
- Duncan Neale (born 1939), English footballer
- Duncan Dundas of Newliston (born 1401), Scottish officer of arms
- Duncan Kirkbride Nichol (born 1941), British hospital administrator
- Duncan L. Niederauer (born 1959), American businessman
- Duncan Norton-Taylor (1904–1982), American journalist
- Duncan Norvelle (1958–2024), British comedian

=== O ===
- Duncan T. O'Brien (1895–1938), American politician
- Duncan O'Mahony (born 1976), Canadian football punter
- Duncan Obee (1918–1998), American football player
- Duncan Ochieng (born 1978), Kenyan footballer
- Duncan Odom (born 2000), American research group leader
- Duncan Ogilvie (1911–1967), Scottish footballer
- Duncan Oppenheim (1904–2003), British businessman
- Duncan Ormond (born 1950), New Zealand footballer
- Duncan Otieno (born 1994), Kenyan footballer
- Duncan Oughton (born 1977), New Zealand footballer
- Duncan Ouseley (born 1946), British judge
- Duncan Owiti (born 1992), Kenyan footballer

=== P ===
- Duncan Page (born 1934), Australian fencer
- Duncan Paia'aua (born 1995), Samoa international rugby union player
- Duncan Pailthorpe (1890–1971), English cricketer, physician, and soldier
- Duncan Paterson (1943–2009), Scottish international rugby union player
- Duncan Patterson (born 1975), English musician
- Duncan Pauline (born 1960), Scottish cricketer
- Duncan Paveling (born 1977), English cricketer and screenwriter
- Duncan Pegg (1980–2021), Australian politician
- Duncan Pell (1807–1874), American politician
- Duncan Penn (born 1983), Entrepreneur, author, and executive producer
- Duncan Penwarden (1880–1930), Canadian actor
- Duncan Perry (born 1962), English cricketer
- Duncan Pescod (born 1959), Hong Kong civil servant
- Duncan Pflaster (born 1973), American dramatist
- Duncan Phillips (art collector) (1886–1966), American art collector
- Duncan Phyfe (1768–1854), American cabinetmaker
- Duncan Pirie (1858–1931), British politician
- Duncan Pitcher (1877–1944), Royal Air Force air commodore
- Duncan Pocklington (1841–1870), English cricketer and Anglican clergyman
- Duncan Pollock (1929–2006), Ulster unionist
- Duncan Carter-Campbell of Possil (1911–1990), British Army officer
- Duncan Potts (born 1961), Royal Navy admiral
- Duncan Pow (born 1977), Scottish actor
- Duncan Pratt (born 1958), English footballer and manager
- Duncan Preston (born 1946), English actor
- Duncan Pritchard (born 1974), American philosophy professor
- Duncan Probert (1961–2016), British medieval scholar
- Duncan Pryde (1937–1997), Canadian politician
- Duncan Pugh (1974–2023), Australian bobsledder

=== R ===
- Duncan Rae (1888–1964), New Zealand politician
- Duncan Reed (1815–1890), American engineer and politician
- Duncan Regehr (born 1952), Canadian multimedia artist and actor
- Duncan Reid (born 1989), Hong Kong-Canadian basketball player
- Duncan Renaldo (1904–1980), Romanian-born American actor
- Duncan Rice (1942–2022), British academic
- Duncan Riddell (born 1993), Scottish field hockey player
- Duncan Ritchie (New Zealand footballer), New Zealand footballer
- Duncan Ritchie (footballer, born 1886) (1886–1968), Scottish footballer
- Duncan Robertson (born 1947), New Zealand international rugby union player
- Duncan Robertson (rugby union, born 1851) (1851–1907), Scottish international rugby union player
- Duncan Robinson (born 1994), American basketball player
- Duncan Robinson (art historian) (1943–2022), British academic and curator
- Duncan Ronaldson (1879–1947), Scottish footballer
- Duncan Ross (British Columbia politician) (1870–1915), Canadian politician
- Duncan Ross (Scottish politician), Scottish politician and academic
- Duncan Alexander Ross (1873–1954), Canadian politician
- Duncan C. Ross (1855–1919), Scottish wrestler
- Duncan Campbell Ross (1871–1961), Canadian politician
- Duncan Graham Ross (1891–1982), Canadian politician
- Duncan Rouleau, American comic book writer and artist
- Duncan Roy (born 1960), English film director and producer
- Duncan Russell (1958–2017), English football manager

=== S ===
- Duncan Saal (born 1996), South African rugby union player
- Duncan Sandys (1908–1987), British politician
- Duncan Sarkies (born 1970), New Zealand writer
- Duncan I of Scotland (1001–1040), King of Alba from 1034 to 1040
- Duncan II of Scotland (1060–1094), King of Alba in 1094
- Duncan Scott-Ford (1921–1942), British sailor executed for treachery
- Duncan Scott (comics) (died 2021), British comics artist
- Duncan Scott (director) (born 1947), American writer and director
- Duncan Scott (swimmer) (born 1997), Scottish swimmer
- Duncan Campbell Scott (1862–1947), Canadian poet and writer
- Duncan Selbie (born 1962), British government official
- Duncan Shanks (born 1937), Scottish painter
- Duncan Sharpe (born 1937), Pakistani cricketer
- Duncan Shaw (judge) (1932–2025), British Columbia Supreme Court member
- Duncan Shaw (minister, born 1727) (1727–1794), Church of Scotland minister
- Duncan Shaw (minister, born 1925) (1925–2018), Scottish Presbyterian minister, historian, and author
- Duncan Shaw (rugby union) (1915–1999), Scottish international rugby union player
- Duncan Shearer (born 1962), Scottish footballer
- Duncan Sheik (1969–2026), American singer-songwriter and composer
- Duncan Shepherd, American film critic
- Duncan Shields, British esports journalist and analyst
- Duncan Shipley-Dalton (born 1970), Northern Irish politician
- Duncan Siemens (born 1993), Canadian ice hockey player
- Duncan Simpson (1927–2017), Scottish pilot
- Duncan Sinclair (Conservative politician) (1869–1951), Canadian politician
- Duncan G. Sinclair (born 1933), American-born Canadian academic
- Duncan James Sinclair (1867–1943), Canadian politician
- Duncan Sloss (1881–1964), Vice-chancellor of the University of Hong Kong
- Duncan Smith (Australian politician) (1890–1973), Australian politician
- Duncan Smith (cricketer), English cricketer and Royal Air Force officer
- Duncan Smith (footballer) (1929–2001), Scottish footballer
- Duncan Smith (Irish politician) (born 1983), Irish politician
- Duncan J. D. Smith (born 1960), British travel writer
- Duncan Snidal, British political scientist
- Duncan Sommerville (1879–1934), Scottish mathematician and astronomer
- Duncan Spedding (born 1977), English footballer
- Duncan Spencer (born 1972), English cricketer
- Duncan Spender (born 1975), Australian politician
- Duncan Sprott (born 1952), British novelist
- Duncan Montgomery Gray Sr. (1898–1966), American bishop
- Duncan Steel (born 1955), British space scientist
- Duncan G. Steel (born 1951), American physicist
- Duncan Stevens (1921–1964), Australian naval officer
- Duncan Stewart (academic) (1930–1996), New Zealand academic administrator
- Duncan Stewart (colonial administrator) (1904–1949), British colonial administrator
- Duncan Stewart (environmentalist) (born 1948), Irish architect and environmentalist
- Duncan Stewart (footballer, born 1860) (born 1860), Scottish footballer
- Duncan Stewart (footballer, born 1900) (born 1900), Scottish footballer
- Duncan Stewart (golfer) (born 1984), Scottish golfer
- Duncan Stewart (Mississippi politician) (1763–1820), American politician
- Duncan Stewart (Uruguayan politician) (1833–1923), Uruguayan politician
- Duncan Alexander Stewart (1850–1936), Canadian politician
- Duncan Stout (1885–1979), New Zealand medic, soldier, and author
- Duncan G. Stroik (born 1962), American architect
- Duncan Stubbs (born 1961), British musician
- Duncan Stutterheim (born 1971), Dutch entrepreneur and sports executive
- Duncan Sutherland (1905–1967), British art director
- Duncan Suttles (born 1945), Canadian chess grandmaster
- Duncan Swann (1879–1962), British barrister, journalist, author and politician
- Duncan Swift (1943–1997), British jazz musician

=== T ===
- Duncan Tanner (1958–2010), Welsh political historian and academic
- Duncan Tappy (born 1984), English racing driver
- Duncan Taylor (diplomat) (born 1958), British diplomat
- Duncan Taylor (rugby union) (born 1989), Scottish international rugby union player
- Duncan Thompson (1895–1980), Australian rugby league footballer
- Duncan Thompson (American football) (1929–1997), American football coach
- Duncan L. Thompson (1880–1930), American accountant
- Duncan Thomson (born 1934), Scottish exhibition curator
- Duncan Thornton (born 1962), Canadian author, speaker, and futurist
- Duncan Todd (born 1975), Hong Kong swimmer
- Duncan Tonatiuh (born 1984), Mexican-American author and illustrator
- Duncan Toombs (born 1977), Australian country singer-songwriter
- Duncan Trussell (born 1974), American comedian and actor
- Duncan Theodore Tsoke (born 1964), South African Catholic prelate (born 1964
- Duncan Tucker (born 2000), American film director and screenwriter

=== U ===
- Duncan Urquhart (footballer) (1908–1956), Scottish footballer
- Duncan Urquhart (politician) (died 1742), British Member of Parliament

=== V ===
- Duncan Vignale, Canadian judoka
- Duncan Vines (1869–1950), English cricketer and Royal Indian Navy officer

=== W ===
- Duncan Waite (born 1952), American professor of education
- Duncan Waldron, Scottish planetarium astronomer and photographer
- Duncan Walker (1899–1963), Scottish footballer
- Duncan S. Walker (c. 1794–1835), American lawyer and politician
- Duncan Stephen Walker (1841–1912), American army officer
- Duncan Wallace (1938–2015), Anglican Church of Canada bishop
- Duncan Watmore (born 1994), English footballer
- Duncan Watson (born 1963), American former child voice actor
- Duncan Watson (diplomat) (1915–1999), British diplomat
- Duncan Watson (politician) (1867–1948), Australian politician
- Duncan Watt (1942–2017), Singaporean author and newscaster
- Duncan J. Watts (born 1971), American sociologist
- Duncan Weatherstone (1898–1972), Scottish politician
- Duncan Webb (born 1968), New Zealand politician
- Duncan Weir (born 1991), Scottish international rugby union player
- Duncan Welbourne (1940–2019), English footballer, coach, and manager
- Duncan Weldon (journalist) (born 1982), Economic journalist
- Duncan Weldon (producer) (1941–2019), British theatre producer
- Duncan Weller (born 1965), Canadian writer and illustrator
- Duncan Whalley (born 1979), English cricketer
- Duncan White (1918–1998), Ceylonese athlete
- Duncan MacGregor Whyte (1866–1953), Scottish artist
- Duncan Wild (born 1962), English cricketer
- Duncan Wilde, English soccer manager
- Duncan Willetts (born 1983), English cricketer
- Duncan Williams (newspaper executive), British publisher
- Duncan Williams (rugby union) (born 1986), Irish rugby union player
- Duncan Ryūken Williams (born 1969), American Buddhist
- Duncan Williamson (1928–2007), Scottish storyteller and singer
- Duncan Wilson (diplomat) (1911–1983), British diplomat
- Duncan Wilson (heritage administrator) (born 1957), CEO of Historic England
- Duncan Wilson (politician) (born 1967), Canadian senator from British Columbia
- Duncan Wingham (born 1957), British physicist
- Duncan Wisbey (born 1971), English actor
- Duncan Wood (1925–1997), British TV producer, director, writer
- Duncan Woods (born 1978), South African water polo player
- Duncan Woods (field hockey), British field hockey player
- Duncan Worsley (born 1941), English cricketer
- Duncan Wright (1940–2023), Australian rules footballer
- Duncan Wu (born 1961), British academic and biographer

== Fictional characters ==
- Duncan, a character in the Total Drama series
- Duncan, the deserted Frank soldier from Saladin: The Animated Series
- Duncan Quagmire, a character in the A Series of Unfortunate Events series by Lemony Snicket
- Duncan, a character in The Railway Series and its televised adaptation, Thomas and Friends
- Duncan Dhu, character of the book Kidnapped by Robert Louis Stevenson inspiring the name of the Spanish band
- Duncan Douglas, a character in Freakazoid!
- Duncan Idaho, a character in the Dune universe created by Frank Herbert
- King Duncan, a character in the William Shakespeare play Macbeth, based on Duncan I of Scotland
- Duncan MacLeod, a character in Highlander: The Series
- Ser Duncan the Tall, a character in Tales of Dunk and Egg, a series of novellas written by George R. R. Martin, set in the same universe as A Song of Ice and Fire
- Duncan P. Anderson, a character in Monsters at Work, a spin-off TV series to the movie Monsters, Inc.
- Duncan Kane, a character in the Veronica Mars TV series
- Duncan Kincaid, a character in Jurassic World Rebirth

== See also ==
- Donnchadh
- Clan Duncan
- Duncan (surname)
