= Duncan MacGregor =

Duncan MacGregor may refer to:

- Duncan MacGregor (academic) (1843–1906), New Zealand university professor, public servant and health administrator
- Duncan MacGregor (rugby union), Scottish rugby union player
- Duncan MacGregor (footballer) (born 1952), Australian rules footballer

== See also ==
- Duncan McGregor (1881–1947), New Zealand rugby union player
