= Duncan Smith =

Duncan Smith may refer to:

- Duncan Smith (Australian politician) (1890–1973), Australian politician
- Duncan Smith (Irish politician) (born 1983), Irish Labour politician
- Duncan Smith (footballer) (born 1929), Scottish footballer
- Duncan J. D. Smith (born 1960), British travel writer, photographer, historian, and explorer
- Duncan Smith (cricketer), British cricket player

== See also ==
- Iain Duncan Smith (born 1954), British Conservative politician
- William Duncan Smith (1825–1862), United States Army officer who fought in the Mexican–American War
- W. G. G. Duncan Smith (1914–1996), British Royal Air Force Second World War Flying ace
- George Smith Duncan (1852–1930), tramway and mining engineer best known for his work on cable trams
