= Duncan Leitch =

Duncan Leitch may refer to:

- Duncan Leitch (neurobiologist)
- Duncan Leitch (geologist)
- Duncan Leitch (minister)
