= Irschick =

Irschick is a surname. Notable people with the surname include:

- Duncan Irschick (born 1969), American evolutionary ecologist
- Eugene F. Irschick, American historian
