= Geoffrey Cox (journalist) =

New Zealand journalist and media executive

Sir Geoffrey Sandford Cox CNZM CBE (7 April 1910 – 2 April 2008) was a New Zealand-born newspaper and television journalist. He was a former editor and chief executive of ITN and a founder of News at Ten.

== Early life ==
Cox was born in Palmerston North, New Zealand, the son of Charles William Sandford Cox, a bank manager, and Mary Cox, daughter of Duncan MacGregor. He was educated at Southland Boys' High School, followed by the University of Otago and then a Rhodes scholarship to Oriel College, Oxford, from 1932 to 1935.

== Career ==
His career in journalism began in 1935 when he joined the News Chronicle. He covered the Spanish Civil War from Madrid, then went to Vienna and Paris for the Daily Express in which he broke the news in 1939 that British troops had arrived in France. He then covered the Winter War from Finland. He was critical of the Soviet attack on Finland but foresaw that the Red Army would defeat the Germans.

He enlisted in the New Zealand Army, serving in Crete and North Africa as an intelligence officer on Freyberg's staff, then was First Secretary at the new New Zealand Embassy in Washington (when Walter Nash was Minister to the United States) before serving in Italy. In 1945, Cox was appointed a Member of the Order of the British Empire (Military Division).

In 1956 he joined ITN, the new commercial TV channel in Britain as News Editor of Independent Television News. In the 1959 New Year Honours, Cox was appointed a Commander of the Order of the British Empire, and in the 1966 New Year Honours he was knighted as a Knight Bachelor. He started News at Ten in 1967. In 1977 Cox joined Yorkshire Television (YTV) as Ward Thomas' Deputy Chairman.

In the 2000 Queen's Birthday Honours, Cox was appointed a Companion of the New Zealand Order of Merit, for services to New Zealand and New Zealand interests in the United Kingdom.

== Personal life ==
He married Cecily Turner in 1935; they had two sons and twin daughters; his wife died in 1993. Cox died in 2008 just 5 days shy of his 98th birthday.

== Bibliography ==
- Defence of Madrid (1937, Victor Gollancz, London) ISBN 978-1-877372-38-4 (2006 Otago University Press edition) (reprinted 2006 review)
- The Red Army Moves (1941, Victor Gollancz, London) (report from Finland on the Winter War)
- The Road to Trieste (1947, Heinemann, London)
- The Race for Trieste (1977, W. Kimber, London) & (1977, Whitcoulls, Christchurch) ISBN 0-7183-0375-X (revision of The Road to Trieste; 1947)
- See It Happen (The Making of ITN) (1983, Bodley Head, London) ISBN 0-370-30950-2
- A Tale of Two Battles (1987, W. Kimber, London) ISBN 0-7183-0642-2 (Greece & Crete, North Africa in World War II; Crete & Sidi Rezegh)
- Countdown to War (1988, W. Kimber, London) ISBN 0-7183-0674-0
- Pioneering Television News: a first hand report on a revolution in journalism (c1995, John Libbey, London) ISBN 0-86196-484-5
- Eyewitness: A Memoir of Europe in the 1930s (1999, University of Otago, Dunedin) ISBN 1-877133-70-1
- A New Zealand Boyhood (2004, Amadines Press, Gloucestershire, England) ISBN 0-948640-65-0

Business positions
Preceded by	Chairman of LBC Radio; 1978 – 1981	Succeeded by
Preceded by	Chairman of Tyne Tees Television; 1971 – 1974	Succeeded by
Preceded by	Deputy Chairman of Yorkshire Television; 1968 – 1971	Succeeded by
Preceded by Aidan Crawley	Editor and Chief Executive of Independent Television News; 1956 – 1968	Succeeded by Sir David Nicholas
