= Duncan Graham =

Duncan Graham may refer to:

- Duncan Archibald Graham (1882–1974), Canadian physician and academic
- Duncan Graham (writer) (born 1938), Australian journalist and blogger
- Duncan Graham (Canadian politician) (1845–1934), Canadian member of parliament for Ontario North, 1897–1900
- Duncan Graham Ross (1891–1982), Canadian member of parliament for Middlesex East, 1935–1945
- Duncan Graham (British politician) (1867–1942), British member of parliament for Hamilton, 1918–1942
- Duncan Graham, South Australian playwright and winner of the Jill Blewett Playwright's Award in 2008 and 2016
