= Duncan McRae =

Duncan McRae may refer to:

- Duncan McRae (rugby) (born 1974), Australian former rugby footballer
- Duncan McRae (politician) (died 1879), Scottish-Canadian politician
- Duncan McRae (actor) (1873–1931), British-American actor and film director
- Duncan McRae (designer) (1919–1984), American industrial designer
- Duncan K. McRae (1820–1888), American politician from North Carolina

== See also ==
- Duncan Macrae (disambiguation)
