= Tony Cottey =

Welsh cricketer (born 1966)

Personal information
- Full name: Phillip Anthony Cottey
- Born: 2 June 1966 (age 60); Swansea, Glamorgan, Wales
- Height: 5 ft 4 in (1.63 m)
- Batting: Right-handed
- Bowling: Right-arm off break
- Role: Occasional wicket-keeper

Domestic team information
- Years: Team
- 1999–2004: Sussex
- 1991/92: Eastern Transvaal
- 1986–1998: Glamorgan

Career statistics
Competition	First-class	List A
Matches	277	282
Runs scored	14,567	4,993
Batting average	36.69	24.00
100s/50s	31/73	–/28
Top score	203	96
Balls bowled	1,534	959
Wickets	16	26
Bowling average	59.62	32.50
5 wickets in innings	–	1
10 wickets in match	–	–
Best bowling	4/49	5/49
Catches/stumpings	182/–	92/–
- Source: Cricinfo, 13 June 2012

Phillip Anthony Cottey (born 2 June 1966) is a Welsh former cricketer who played for Glamorgan, Sussex and Eastern Transvaal in a first-class career lasting 18 years. He was a right-hand batsman and right-arm off-spin bowler.

== Early life ==
Cottey was born in Swansea, Glamorgan, Wales.

== Football career ==
Cottey played professional football for Swansea City in the 1984–85 season. Having come through the youth set-up he signed a professional contract in June 1984. He made three Football League appearances during the season before he was released in May 1985 by manager John Bond. Cottey also played for Wales Youth as captain. He also played soccer for Llanelli AFC.

== Cricket career ==
=== Glamorgan ===
Having played Second XI cricket in 1985, Cottey made his first-class debut for Glamorgan against Oxford University in 1986, opening the batting with Duncan Pauline he scored 6. He played three further first-class matches in his maiden season, finishing with 24 runs at an average of 6.

Cottey was used more regularly over the next two seasons, in 1988 playing 13 matches and scoring 603 runs, including five fifties. His maiden first-class fifty came against Cambridge University in the early part of the 1988 season. He scored 68 in the first innings and followed it with 92 in the second before he was dismissed, 8 short of a maiden century, by Mike Atherton.

He played just four matches the following season but had a breakthrough year in 1990 as he passed 1,000 runs for the first time in his career, included in this aggregate were three centuries. The first came in early June against Oxford University, opening the batting he scored 156. The other two centuries came in back-to-back innings against Leicestershire and Worcestershire.

Cottey had a poor season in 1991, in 20 innings he passed fifty just once and finished the year with an average of 23. However, after a winter season with Eastern Transvaal (see below) he returned to Wales in better form. He scored 1,076 runs at an average of 46.78, with two centuries against Durham and Kent. He was awarded his county cap at the end of the season.

Cottey passed the landmark of 1,000 runs in a season in each of the next four years, culminating with his best seasonal total of 1,543 runs in 1996. The figure contained four centuries, including his first and only double century. Playing against Leicestershire at Swansea he scored 203 off 333 balls and aided a Glamorgan recovery from 127/6 with a 211 run seventh wicket partnership with Ottis Gibson. The match also witnessed Cottey's best career bowling performance as he took 4/49 in the first innings.

Cottey was a regular member of the Glamorgan team that won the County Championship in 1997, although his personal form was modest, scoring 475 runs at 27.94. He passed 1,000 runs in 1998, however, he left the club at the end of the season because contract negotiations broke down.

Cottey played 197 matches for Glamorgan, scoring 10,346 runs at 38.17, with 21 centuries.

=== Sussex ===
Cottey signed a five-year contract with Sussex, and made his debut for the club in the opening fixture of the 1999 season against Lancashire, he finished his maiden season with 780 runs and was awarded a county cap. After a similarly productive season in 2000, Cottey made just two appearances in 2001 as he was sidelined with tennis elbow.

In 2003 Cottey passed 1,000 runs for the eighth and final occasion in his career, he scored 1,149 at 45.96. In mid-season he enjoyed a sequence of seven consecutive fifties and only narrowly failed to score four successive hundreds. It was a successful season for Sussex as they won their first County Championship title since 1855. Cottey completed the rare feat of winning titles with two clubs.

Cottey was released by Sussex at the end of the 2004 season, his first team appearances had been limited by the arrival of Ian Ward. In six seasons with Sussex he made 74 appearances scoring 3,948 runs at 33.74, with 10 centuries.

=== Eastern Transvaal ===
Cottey played one season of South African domestic cricket in 1991–92. He played five matches, scoring 253 runs at 36.14, as Eastern Transvaal won the UCB Bowl.

== Post-cricket ==
Cottey was an after dinner speaker. In 2008, he published an autobiography entitled There's Only 2 Tony Cotteys, named after crowd chants he received during an innings which took Glamorgan to the Sunday League title in 1993. The reference is to the footballer of a similar name Tony Cottee. Co-written by David Brayley, the book is published by Gomer Press and has been nominated for the Cricket Society Cricket Book of the Year 2009.

Cottey returned to Sussex in 2009 when he was appointed business relationship manager, he left this role in 2021.
