= Duncan Macrae =

Duncan Macrae or Duncan MacRae may refer to:

- Duncan Macrae (actor) (1905–1967), Scottish actor
- Duncan Macrae (rugby union) (1914–2007), Scottish rugby union footballer
- Duncan MacRae (rugby league) (1934–2019), New Zealand rugby league footballer
- Donnchadh MacRath a.k.a. Duncan MacRae of Inverinate (died between 1693 and 1704), Gaelic poet and compiler

== See also ==
- Duncan McRae (disambiguation)
