= United Society Partners in the Gospel =

United Kingdom-based charitable organization

USPG
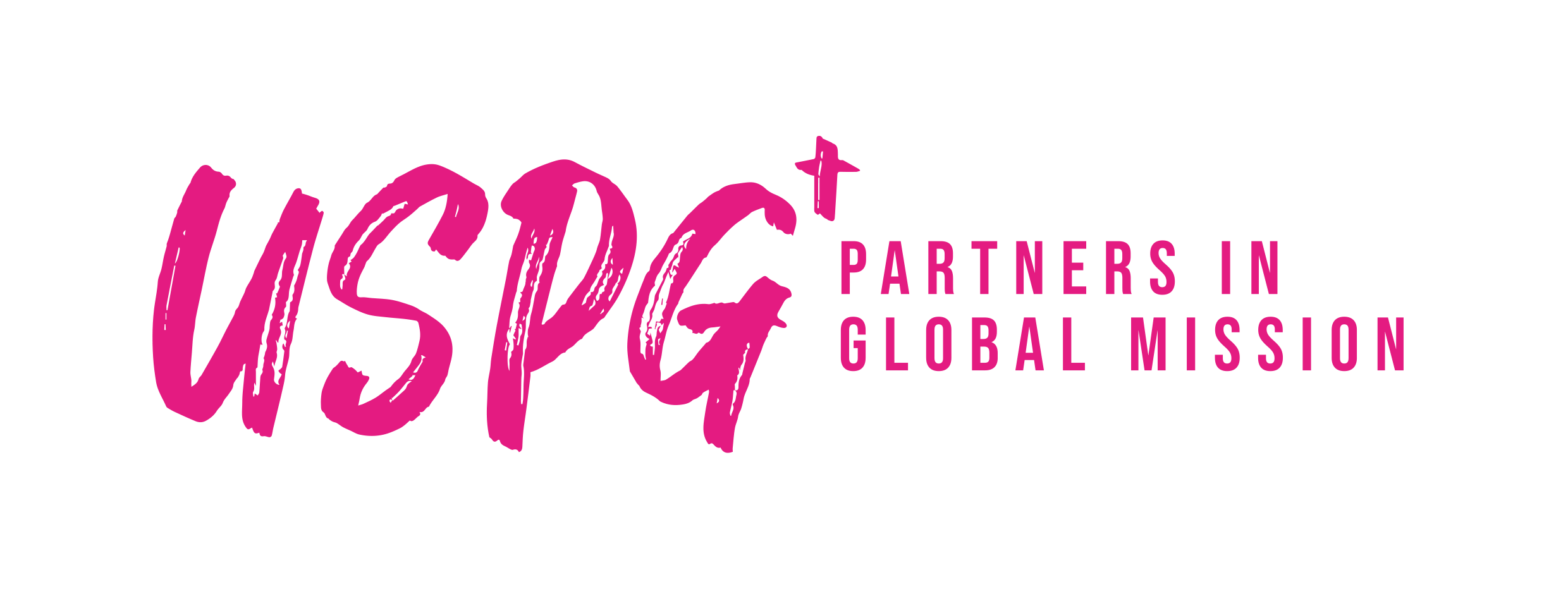
- Founded: 1701; 325 years ago
- Founder: Thomas Bray
- Location: London, United Kingdom
- Origins: Society for the Propagation of the Gospel in Foreign Parts (SPG)
- Key people: The Rev'd Duncan Dormor (General Secretary); Archbishop of Canterbury (President)
- Revenue: £3.8m (2018)
- Employees: 24 (2019)
- Website: uspg.org.uk

United Society Partners in the Gospel (USPG) is a United Kingdom–based charitable organisation (registered charity no. 234518, registered name The United Society).

It was first incorporated under Royal Charter in 1701 as the Society for the Propagation of the Gospel in Foreign Parts (SPG) as a high church missionary organisation of the Church of England and was active in the Thirteen Colonies of North America. The group was renamed in 1965 as the United Society for the Propagation of the Gospel (USPG) after incorporating the activities of the Universities' Mission to Central Africa (UMCA). In 1968 the Cambridge Mission to Delhi also joined the organisation. From November 2012 until 2016, the name was United Society or Us. In 2016, it was announced that the Society would return to the name USPG, this time standing for United Society Partners in the Gospel, from 25 August 2016.

During its more than three hundred years of operations, the Society has supported more than 15,000 men and women in mission roles within the worldwide Anglican Communion. Working through local partner churches, the charity's current focus is the support of emergency relief, longer-term development, and Christian leadership training projects. The charity encourages parishes in United Kingdom and Ireland to participate in Christian mission work through fundraising, prayer, and by setting up links with its projects around the world.

== History ==
=== Foundation and mission work in North America ===
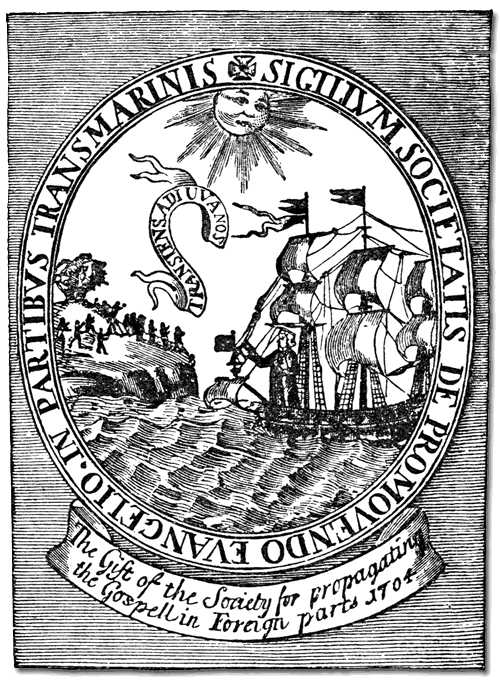
Seal of the "Society for the Propagation of the Gospel in Foreign Parts" (1701)

In 1700, Henry Compton, Bishop of London (1675–1713), requested the Revd Thomas Bray to report on the state of the Church of England in the American Colonies. Bray, after extended travels in the region, reported that the Anglican church in America had "little spiritual vitality" and was "in a poor organizational condition". Under Bray's initiative, the Society for the Propagation of the Gospel in Foreign Parts was authorised by convocation and incorporated by Royal Charter on 16 June 1701. King William III issued a charter establishing the SPG as "an organisation able to send priests and schoolteachers to America to help provide the Church's ministry to the colonists". The new society had two main aims: Christian ministry to British people overseas; and evangelisation of the non-Christian races of the world.

The society's first two missionaries, graduates of the University of Aberdeen, George Keith and Patrick Gordon, sailed from England for North America on 24 April 1702. By 1710 the Society's charter had expanded to include work among enslaved Africans in the West Indies and Native Americans in North America. The SPG funded clergy and schoolmasters, dispatched books, and supported catechists through annual fundraising sermons in London that publicised the work of the mission society. Queen Anne was a noted early supporter, contributing her own funds and authorising in 1711 the first of many annual Royal Letters requiring local parishes in England to raise a "liberal contribution" for the Society's work overseas.

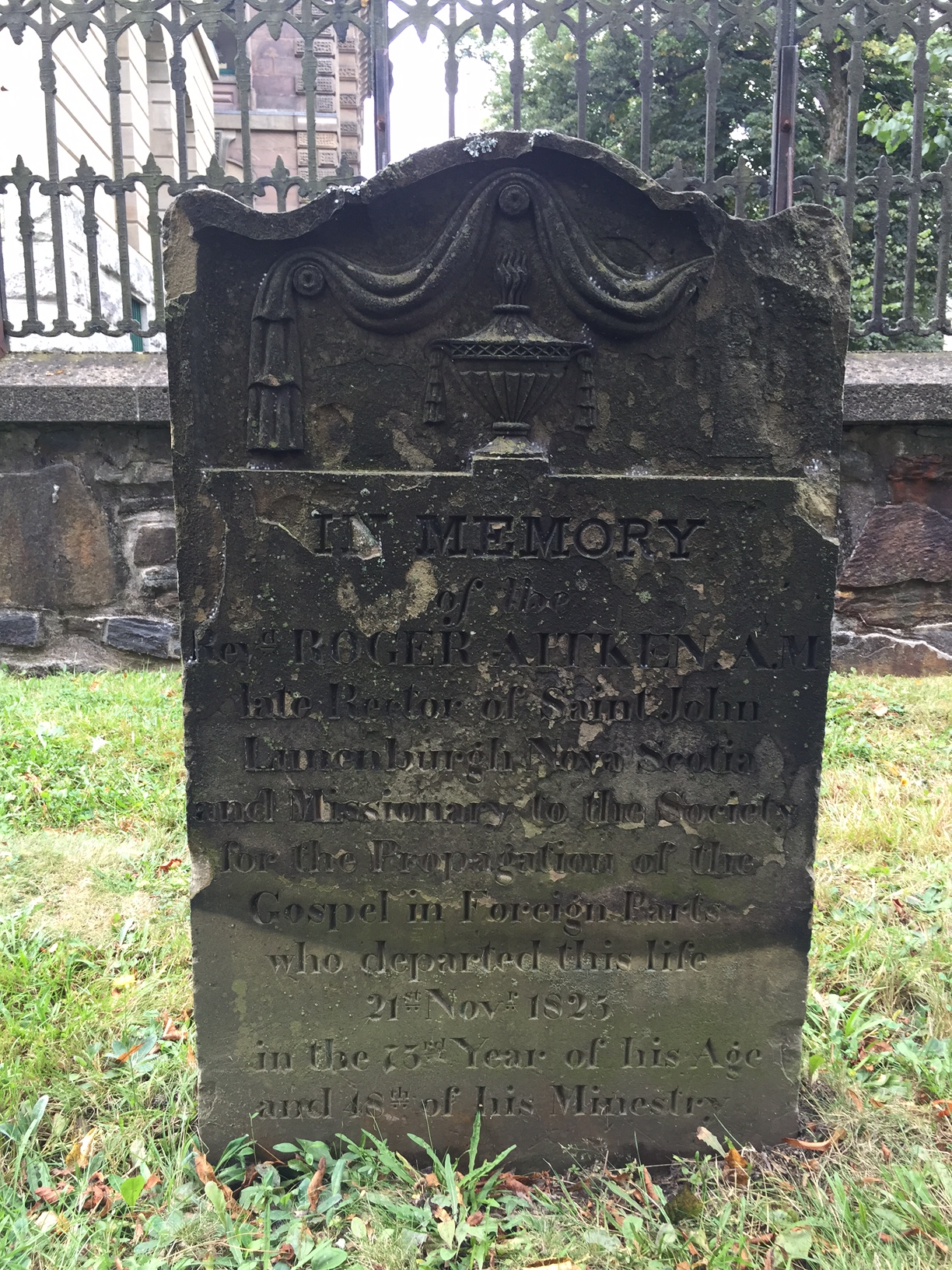
Missionary Rev. Roger Aitken (d. 1825), Old Burying Ground (Halifax, Nova Scotia)

In New England, the Society had to compete with a growing Congregational church movement, as the Anglican Church was not established here. With resourceful leadership it made significant inroads in more traditional Puritan states such as Connecticut and Massachusetts. The SPG also helped to promote distinctive designs for new churches using local materials, and promoted the addition of steeples. The white church with steeple was copied by other groups and became associated with New England-style churches among the range of Protestant denominations. Such designs were also copied by church congregations in the Southern colonies.

From 1702 until the American Revolution, the SPG had recruited and employed more than 309 missionaries to the American colonies that came to form the United States. Many of the parishes founded by SPG clergy on the Eastern seaboard of the United States are now listed among the historic parishes of the Episcopal Church. SPG clergy were instructed to live simply, but considerable funds were used on the construction of new church properties. The SPG clergy were ordained, university-educated men, described at one time by Thomas Jefferson as "Anglican Jesuits". They were recruited from across the British Isles and further afield; only one third of the missionaries employed by the Society in the 18th century were English. Included in their number such notable individuals as George Keith, and John Wesley, the founder of Methodism (which was originally a movement within the Anglican Church). The SPG and all British officials were permanently expelled from North America in 1776.

=== West Indies ===
Through a charitable bequest bestowed upon the SPG by Barbadian planter and colonial administrator Christopher Codrington, the Codrington Plantations (and the slaves working on them) came under the ownership of the Society. With the aim of supplying funding for Codrington College in Barbados, the SPG was the beneficiary of the forced labour of thousands of enslaved Africans on the plantations. Many of the slaves on the plantations died from such diseases as dysentery and typhoid, after being weakened by overwork. The SPG even branded its slaves on the chest with the word SOCIETY to show who they belonged to. In 1758, the archbishop of Canterbury, Thomas Secker, agreed to reimburse funds to the SPG's accounts for the purchase of slaves from Africa and the hiring of third party enslaved labour. Between 1710 and 1838, around 600 to 1,200 slaves lived and died on the plantations.

The ownership of the Codrington Plantations by the SPG started to come under scrutiny during the late 18th century, as the British abolitionist movement started to emerge. In 1783, Bishop Beilby Porteus, an early proponent of abolitionism, used the occasion of the SPG's annual anniversary sermon to highlight the conditions at the Codrington Plantations and called for the SPG to end its connection with colonial slavery. However, the SPG did not relinquish ownership of its plantations in Barbados until the passage in Parliament of the Slavery Abolition Act 1833.

At the February 2006 meeting of the Church of England's General Synod, attendees commemorated the church's role in helping to pass the Slave Trade Act 1807 to abolish Britain's involvement in the slave trade. The attendees also voted unanimously to apologise to the descendants of slaves for the church's involvement in and support of the slave trade and slavery. Tom Butler, the bishop of Southwark, confirmed in a speech before the vote that the Society for the Propagation of the Gospel in Foreign Parts had owned the Codrington Plantations.

On Friday 8 September 2023, USPG announced at a press conference in Barbados that it would be seeking to address the wrongs of the past by committing to a long-term project: ‘Renewal & Reconciliation: The Codrington Reparations Project’. The project will be in partnership with Codrington Trust and the Church in the Province of the West Indies (CPWI). The work will include four areas of work in collaboration with the descendants of the enslaved; community development and engagement; historical research and education; burial places and memorialisation, and family research. USPG has pledged, in response to proposals that Codrington Trust has advanced 18M Barbadian dollars (£7M) to be spent in Barbados over the next 10–15 years to support this work.

=== Africa ===
The Rev. Thomas Thompson, having formerly served as an SPG missionary in colonial New Jersey, established the Society's first mission outpost at Cape Coast Castle on the Gold Coast in 1752. In 1754, he arranged for three local students to travel to England be trained as missionaries at the Society's expense. Two died from ill health, but the surviving student, Philip Quaque, became the first African to receive ordination in the Anglican Communion. He returned to the Gold Coast in 1765 and worked there in a missionary capacity until his death in 1816.

SPG missionary activities in South Africa began in 1821. The Society's work in the wider region made significant progress under the leadership of Bishop Robert Gray, expanding to Natal in 1850, Zululand in 1859, Swaziland in 1871 and Mozambique in 1894. During the period 1752–1906, the Society employed a total of 668 European and locally recruited missionaries in Africa.

=== Global expansion ===
The Society established mission outposts in Canada in 1759, Australia in 1793, and India in 1820. It later expanded outside the British Empire to China in 1863, Japan in 1873, and Korea in 1890. By the middle of the 19th century, the Society's work was focused more on the promotion and support of indigenous Anglican churches and the training of local church leadership, than on the supervision and care of colonial and expatriate church congregations.

From the mid-1800s until the Second World War, the pattern of mission work remained similar: pastoral, evangelistic, educational and medical work contributing to the growth of the Anglican Church and aiming to improve the lives of local people. During this period, the SPG also supported increasing numbers of indigenous missionaries of both sexes, as well as medical missionary work.

=== Women's missionary leadership ===
To a limited degree, the Society was socially progressive from the mid-1800s in its encouragement of women from Britain and Ireland, including single women, to train and work as missionaries in their own right, rather than only as the wives of male missionaries. In 1866, the SPG established the Ladies' Association for Promoting the Education of Females in India and other Heathen Countries in Connection with the Missions of the Society for the Propagation of the Gospel. In 1895, this group was updated to the Women's Mission Association for the Promotion of Female Education in the Missions of the SPG. As part of the inclusion of more women in this organisation, Marie Elizabeth Hayes was accepted into the Society for the Propagation of the Gospel in 1905. She served as a member of the Cambridge Mission to Delhi, India, where she is known for her notable work as a Christian Medical Missionary. Her leadership in the medical field encouraged greater participation of women in the Society's mission activities.

The promotion of women's leadership within the Society's overseas mission activities was championed for many years by Louise Creighton, also an advocate for women's suffrage. At the peak of SPG missionary activity in India, between 1910 and 1930, more than 60 European women missionaries were at any one time employed in teaching, medical or senior administrative roles in the country. In Japan, Mary Cornwall Legh, working among people with Hansen's disease at Kusatsu, Gunma. She was regarded as one of the most effective Christian missionaries to have served in the Nippon Sei Ko Kai. In China, Ethel Margaret Phillips (1876–1951) was an SPG medical missionary who constructed two hospitals, worked with the YWCA, and went on to establish a private practice.

=== Children's branch ===
The children's section of the society was called the King's Messengers.

=== Post-Second World War reorganisation ===
The SPG, alongside the Church Mission Society (CMS), continued to be one of the leading agencies for evangelistic mission and relief work for the Churches of England, Wales, and Ireland in the decades following the Second World War. In the context of decolonisation in Africa and India's independence in 1947, new models of global mission engagement between the interdependent member provinces of the Anglican Communion were required.

In 1965, the SPG merged with the Universities' Mission to Central Africa (UMCA), and in 1968 with the Cambridge Mission to Delhi, to form the United Society for the Propagation of the Gospel (USPG). The Society found a new role in support of clergy training and in the movement of community development specialists, resources and ideas around the world church.

== Notable churches, health care, and educational institutions ==
The list of SPG- and USPG-founded and sponsored church, healthcare, and educational institutions is geographically diverse. In some cases direct funding was supplied by the Society; in others SPG and USPG mission staff played prominent roles as founding ordained clergy, fundraisers, academic and administrative staff.

=== Africa ===
Ghana

- Adisadel College (1910)

South Africa

- Grahamstown Cathedral (1824)
- Diocesan College, Cape Town (1849)

Zimbabwe

- Bonda Mission Hospital (1928)

=== Asia ===
China

- St. Faith's School, Beijing (1890)

India

- Bishop's College, Calcutta (1824)
- Holy Trinity Church, Idaiyangudi, Tamilnadu (1880)
- St. Stephen's College, Delhi (1881)
- St. John's Cathedral church, Nazareth, Tamil Nadu
- St. Michael and All Angels church, Mudalur, Tamil Nadu
- St. Thomas (SPG) Cathedral, Secunderabad (1852)

Japan

- St. Andrew's Cathedral, Tokyo (1879)
- Shoin Junior & Senior High School, Kobe (1892)

Myanmar

- St. John's College, Yangon (1863)

=== Americas ===
Barbados

- Codrington College, St. John (1745)

Canada

- St. Paul's Church (Halifax), Nova Scotia (1749)

United States

- Christ Church, Dover, Delaware (1704)
- Christ's Church, Rye, New York (originally Grace Church) (1705)
- St. Paul's Church (now known as Old Narragansett Church), Wickford, Rhode Island (1706)
- Trinity Church on the Green, New Haven, Connecticut (1723)
- St. Peter's Episcopal Church, Freehold, New Jersey (1702)
- Christ Episcopal Church, Middletown, New Jersey (1702)
- Christ Episcopal Church, Shrewsbury, New Jersey (1702)

=== Oceania ===
New Zealand

- St John's College, Auckland (1843)

Australia

- Trinity Church, Adelaide (1836)

== Current activities ==
The modern charity's work is devoted to increasing local churches' capacity to be agents of positive change in the communities that they serve. The United Society "seeks to advance Christian religion", but also to promote and support local Anglican church partners in their mission activities in a local community context. Project work includes community-based health-care provision for expectant mothers and for those with HIV and AIDS, as well as education and work skills training programmes. The charity is also involved in the training and development of Anglican lay and ordained church leaders and localised social advocacy on a diverse range of issues from gender based violence to climate change.

The modern charity retains its funding and governance links with the Church of England, the archbishop of Canterbury being the president of the charity.

Projects in Africa still attract the largest percentage of the United Society's funding due to historic links and established endowments. In the financial year 2013, the charity supported church based initiatives in poverty relief, health, education and church leadership training in 20 different countries.

== See also ==
- List of Christian missionaries
- List of Protestant missionary societies in China (1807–1953)
