= No Time for Figleaves =

1965 play by Duncan Greenwood and Robert King

No Time for Fig Leaves is a comic play by Duncan Greenwood and Robert King. It was presented at the Palace Theatre, Westcliff-on-Sea in August 1965. The play was published by Samuel French in 1966 in London.

== Synopsis ==
The play is set in the 1950s. Due to an atomic accident, every man in the world has disappeared except for two that were sheltered underground and escaped the effects. Women are now in positions of power across every institution on Earth. The two surviving men are confined in Britain at the Prime Minister's country home while their captors ponder the men's capability to repopulate the earth. The men attempt to escape, motivated to be surrounded by millions of women of their choosing.

== Characters ==
- Monica Sharp - Constance's Private Secretary
- Constance Claythorpe - The Prime Minister
- Dora - The Servant
- Lydia Parler - M.P. Minister of Science
- Nigel Lawler - RAF Wing Commander
- Major Danvers - Bishop, W.R.A.C.
- David Maxton - Professor
- Helen Marchbanks - W.R.N.S., 1st Lord of the Admiralty
- Eve Forster - Corporal, W.R.A.C.

== Performance history ==
In August 1965, No Time for Fig Leaves was presented at the Palace, Westcliff by Haymarket Stage Productions, directed by Alexander Bridge.

- Monica Sharp – Peggy Aitchison
- Constance Claythorpe – Barbara Miller
- Dora – Susanna Pinney
- Lydia Parler – Pauline Garner.
- Nigel Lawler – Angus Lennie
- Major Danvers – Beatrice Shaw
- David Maxton – Ken Wards
- Helen Marchbanks – Daphne Odin-Pearse
- Eve Forster – Penelope Harris
