= John MacGregor (rugby union) =

Scotland international rugby union player (1885–1940)

- Born: John Roy MacGregor; 27 August 1885 Pontypridd, Wales
- Died: 24 July 1940 (aged 54) Harefield, England
- Notable relative(s): Duncan MacGregor, brother

Rugby union career
- Position: Fly-half
Amateur team(s)
Years	Team	Apps	(Points)
- Edinburgh University
Provincial / State sides
Years	Team	Apps	(Points)
1910	Edinburgh District		
International career
Years	Team	Apps	(Points)
1909	Scotland	1	(0)

John Roy MacGregor (27 August 1885 – 14 July 1940) was a Scotland international rugby union player.

== Rugby Union career ==
=== Amateur career ===
He played rugby union for Edinburgh University.

=== Provincial career ===
MacGregor played in the Inter-City match on 3 December 1910 for Edinburgh District against Glasgow District.

=== International career ===
He was capped once for Scotland in 1909.
