= Duncan A. Mellichamp =

American chemical engineer

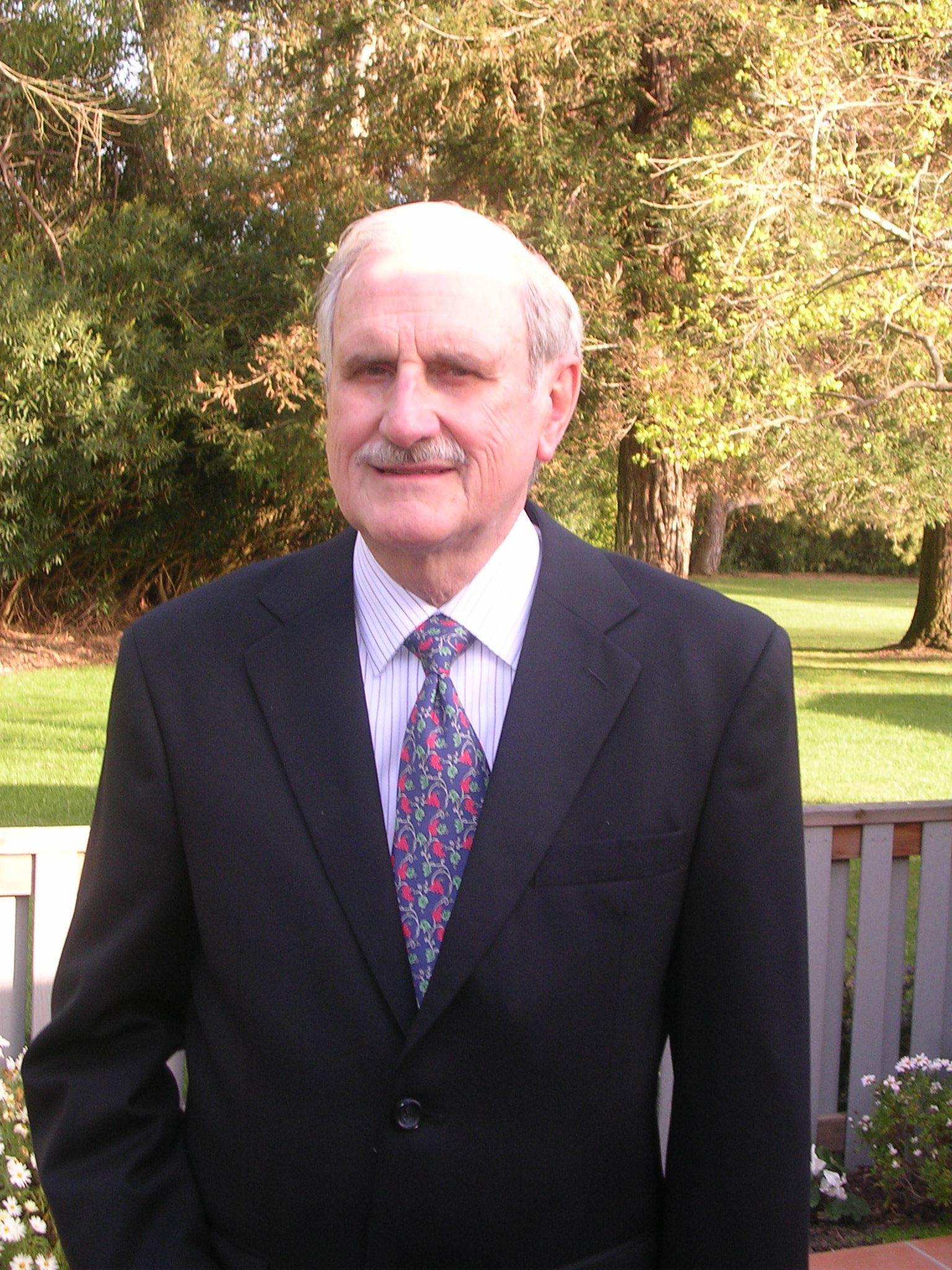
- Born: Powder Springs, Georgia
- Education: Georgia Tech; Technische Hochschule Stuttgart; Purdue University
- Known for: process modeling, control, and optimization
- Scientific career
- Fields: Chemical engineering
- Workplaces: University of California, Santa Barbara

Duncan Adair Mellichamp is an American chemical engineer, academic, and author. He is a professor emeritus of Chemical Engineering at the University of California, Santa Barbara (UCSB), working on process control, academia, and philanthropy. In 1990, He was awarded with the Merriam-Wiley Award by the American Society for Engineering Education for the engineering textbook published in 1989, Process Dynamics and Control. He received the American Statistical Association's Statistics in Chemistry Award in 1994 and was elected Chair of the UCSB Academic Senate from 1990 to 1992.

== Biography ==
He was born in a rural house near Powder Springs, Georgia, in a home without running water or electricity. He earned his BS in Chemical Engineering from Georgia Tech in 1959, followed by post-graduate studies at the Technische Hochschule Stuttgart in Germany, where he gained exposure to computer design and programming. He completed his PhD in Chemical Engineering at Purdue University in 1964.

=== Career ===
After completing his PhD, Mellichamp returned to DuPont as a research engineer, working on developments in polyethylene terephthalate (PET) precursors. His work at DuPont led to a patent for a new technique to produce polyester polymer without a catalyst.

In 1966, Mellichamp transitioned to academia, joining the newly established chemical engineering program at the University of California, Santa Barbara (UCSB). He designed and built two laboratories, one for undergraduate process control and another for real-time computing. Mellichamp also collaborated with colleagues to develop new undergraduate and graduate programs in chemical engineering.

Mellichamp authored or co-authored over 100 research publications on process modeling, large-scale systems analysis, and computer control. He co-authored the textbook Process Dynamics and Control (1989), which has been translated into multiple languages and is now in its fourth edition.

Mellichamp held several leadership roles at UCSB and within the University of California (UC) system. He served as Chair of the UCSB Academic Senate (1990–1992) and the UC system-wide Academic Senate (1995–1997), during which time he also served ex officio on the UC Board of Regents. In 2018, he received the Oliver Johnson Award for Distinguished Leadership in the UC Academic Senate.

Beyond academia, Mellichamp contributed to the arts and community development. He served as president of Opera Santa Barbara, helping to stabilize the organization during financial difficulties. He also played a role in developing UCSB's North Campus Open Space (NCOS) and preserving the Ellwood-Devereux bluffs.

Mellichamp and his wife, Suzanne, have made philanthropic contributions to the University of California, Santa Barbara (UCSB), with a focus on advancing academic and supporting emerging research fields. Among his work is the establishment of the Mellichamp Academic Chairs program, which funds three rotating clusters of four endowed faculty positions in interdisciplinary areas.

== Research ==
Mellichamp's research is focused on chemical engineering, particularly in process control and real-time computing. In the 1970s, he was among the early users of digital computers for data acquisition, control, and dynamic simulation.

In his post-retirement years, Mellichamp focused on estimating profitability and risk in the design of large-scale chemical plants. His use of exact, collapsed (“exo-parametric") modeling methods provided a strategy for optimizing financially dependent variables in plant design with a new, normalized expression for NPV_{%}.

== Awards ==
In 2010, Mellichamp was awarded the CACHE Award by the American Society for Engineering Education (ASEE) Chemical Engineering Division for his contributions to computing in chemical engineering. In 2007, he received the Outstanding Chemical Engineer Award from Purdue University’s Department of Chemical Engineering. The same year, he and his wife, Suzanne, were awarded the UCSB Medal, the university's highest honor.

In April 2020, he was inducted into the Control Process Automation Hall of Fame.

Mellichamp was inducted into the Georgia Tech College of Engineering's Engineering Hall of Fame in 2004 and was named a member of its Academy of Distinguished Engineering Alumni in 1995.

== Selected publications ==
- Mellichamp, Duncan A.; Griffin, Derek W.; Doherty, Michael F. (2010). "Reducing the mean size of API crystals by continuous manufacturing with product classification and recycle". Chemical Engineering Science. 65 (21): 5770–5780. Bibcode:2010ChEnS..65.5770G. doi:10.1016/j.ces.2010.05.026. ISSN 0009-2509.
- Mellichamp, Duncan A.; Griffin, Derek W.; Doherty, Michael F. (2009-09-02). "Effect of Competing Reversible Reactions on Optimal Operating Policies for Plants with Recycle". Industrial & Engineering Chemistry Research. 48 (17): 8037–8047. doi:10.1021/ie801482z. ISSN 0888-5885.
- Griffin, Derek W.; Mellichamp, Duncan A.; Doherty, Michael F. (2008-08-26). "Selectivity versus conversion and optimal operating policies for plants with recycle". AIChE Journal. 54 (10): 2597–2609. Bibcode:2008AIChE..54.2597G. doi:10.1002/aic.11583. ISSN 0001-1541.
- Griffin, Derek W.; Mellichamp, Duncan A.; Doherty, Michael F. (2008-08-26). "Selectivity versus conversion and optimal operating policies for plants with recycle". AIChE Journal. 54 (10): 2597–2609. Bibcode:2008AIChE..54.2597G. doi:10.1002/aic.11583. ISSN 0001-1541.
- Mellichamp, Duncan A.; Ward, Jeffrey D.; Doherty, Michael F.; Griffin, Derek W. (1 November 2006). "Steady-State Operating Policies for Plants with Multiple Reactions of Equal Overall Order". Industrial & Engineering Chemistry Research. 45 (24): 8056–8062. doi:10.1021/ie051412p. ISSN 0888-5885.
- Ward, Jeffrey D.; Mellichamp, Duncan A.; Doherty, Michael F. (June 2006). "Choosing an operating policy for seeded batch crystallization". AIChE Journal. 52 (6): 2046–2054. Bibcode:2006AIChE..52.2046W. doi:10.1002/aic.10808.
- Mellichamp, Duncan A. (1 January 1979). "Real-time computing for chemical engineers". Computers & Chemical Engineering. 3 (1): 225–227. doi:10.1016/0098-1354(79)80038-1. ISSN 0098-1354.
- Mellichamp, Duncan A. (September 2019). "Profitability, risk, and investment in conceptual plant design: Optimizing key financial parameters rigorously using NPV". Computers & Chemical Engineering. 128: 450–467. doi:10.1016/j.compchemeng.2019.04.016.
- Mellichamp, Duncan A. (November 2017). "Internal rate of return: Good and bad features, and a new way of interpreting the historic measure". Computers & Chemical Engineering. 106: 396–406. doi:10.1016/j.compchemeng.2017.06.005.
- Mellichamp, Duncan A. (November 2018). "Exo-parametric ("inside-out") model of discounted cash flow calculations using NPV%: Macro calculation of coefficients for an exact, collapsed financial model". Computers & Chemical Engineering. 119: 309–314. doi:10.1016/j.compchemeng.2018.09.001.

== Books ==
- Mellichamp, Duncan A. (1983). Real-time computing: with applications to data acquisition and control. New York: Van Nostrand Reinhold. ISBN 0442213727.
- Seborg, Dale E.; Edgar, Thomas F.; Mellichamp, Duncan A.; Doyle, Francis J. (2017). Process dynamics and control (Fourth ed.). Hoboken, N.J: Wiley. ISBN 978-1119587491.
