= Duncan Stewart (footballer, born 1900) =

Scottish footballer

Personal information
- Full name: Duncan Smart Stewart
- Date of birth: 8 September 1900
- Place of birth: Dundee, Scotland
- Height: 5 ft 8 in (1.73 m)
- Position: Full-back

Senior career*
Years	Team	Apps	(Gls)
1922–1923	Sunderland	1	(0)
1923–1925	Southend United	1	(0)
- * Club domestic league appearances and goals

Duncan Smart Stewart (8 September 1900 – after 1924) was a Scottish professional footballer who played as a full-back for Sunderland.
