= Duncan Napier (cricketer) =

Scottish cricketer and British Army officer (1871–1898)

Personal information
- Full name: Duncan Robertson Napier
- Born: 6 October 1871; Croydon, Surrey, England
- Died: 24 October 1898 (aged 27); Kensington, London, England
- Batting: Left-handed
- Bowling: Slow left-arm orthodox

Domestic team information
- Years: Team
- 1892: Marylebone Cricket Club

Career statistics
Competition	First-class
Matches	2
Runs scored	50
Batting average	16.66
100s/50s	–/–
Top score	33
Catches/stumpings	1/–
- Source: Cricinfo, 1 September 2021

Duncan Robertson Napier (6 October 1871 – 24 October 1898) was a Scottish first-class cricketer and British Army officer.

The son of the Scotsman William Henry Edward Napier, he was born in October 1871 at Croydon. He was educated at Harrow School, before attending the Royal Military College, Sandhurst. He graduated from Sandhurst in 1892, being awarded the Sword of Honour for being the best cadet at Sandhurst. He entered into the Oxfordshire Light Infantry as a second lieutenant in May 1892. He made two appearances in first-class cricket for the Marylebone Cricket Club in the same month as his graduation, appearing against Lancashire and Yorkshire at Lord's. He scored 50 runs in his two matches, with a highest score of 33. Napier served with the Oxfordshire Light Infantry in British India, seeing action in the North-West Frontier Province in the Tirah campaign of 1897–98. He was seriously wounded in action during the campaign, returning to Britain where he succumbed to his injuries at Kensington in October 1898. Conversely, the Tirah memorial in Oxford records Napier as having died as a result of disease on active service.
