= Duncan Willetts =

English cricketer (born 1983)

Duncan Richard Willetts (born 26 October 1983) is a former English cricketer. He was a right-handed wicket-keeper batsman who played for Herefordshire. He was born in Stourbridge.

Willetts, who first appeared for Herefordshire in the 38-County Cup in 2001, made his only List A appearance for the team in the C&G Trophy competition of 2004, against Worcestershire. He did not bat nor bowl during the match.
