= Duncan Shepherd =

American film critic

Duncan Shepherd, a longtime film critic, wrote a weekly column for the alternative weekly the San Diego Reader from 1972 until November 2010.

Shepherd's pithy, incisive, and (in later years) very often negative reviews have sparked strong reactions from readers.

Shepherd attended Columbia University ("a school chosen solely for the number of proximate movie theaters in New York City", according to the critic) and received a Master's degree from the University of California, San Diego. His thesis, entitled "Scratching the surface: a speculation into the importance of the image in a movie and the neglect of the image in movie criticism", was published in 1974.

At UCSD he took film classes from Manny Farber (Negative Space), a noted film critic and painter. Shepherd, in fact, was a "sounding board" for a 1971 Farber essay on director Raoul Walsh ("He Used to Be a Big Shot"), found in Farber's book (originally published in Artforum magazine).

At the San Diego Reader, Shepherd awarded a "priority" to movies from one to five stars, with "antipathies" receiving a black spot. Five-star reviews became rare: only four movies since 2000 have received the highest rating: Mystic River (2003), Stevie (2002), Fados (2008), A Serious Man (2009). Fewer than 100 films were listed as 5-star films, while nearly 2,000 have had the black spot bestowed upon them.

Favorite directors with a number of five-star films include Alain Resnais and Akira Kurosawa. Among contemporary directors, Shepherd praises perhaps the Coen brothers and Clint Eastwood the highest.

Many of the directors and producers Farber championed in Negative Space are favored by Shepherd as well, including Val Lewton (Curse of the Cat People, a 5-star rated film), Preston Sturges, Jean-Luc Godard (Alphaville, Contempt), Luis Buñuel (The Exterminating Angel) and Nicolas Roeg (Cold Heaven). Also, the "long-neglected" action directors found in Farber's famous "Underground Films" essay from 1957: e.g., Raoul Walsh, William Wellman, Robert Wise ("a sometime member of the underground"), John Farrow (The Big Clock, 5 stars) and Robert Aldrich (Kiss Me Deadly and Ulzana's Raid, both 5 stars).

A chief concern of Shepherd's is cinematography, which he frequently commented on in his column using descriptive language (he did not care for the "dingy, dungeony image" of the Academy Award-winning Chicago, for example. Nor does he much appreciate digital video, which he typically finds blurry and fuzzy. The then-state-of-the-art digital video found in George Lucas's Star Wars: Episode II – Attack of the Clones, for example, is "somewhat overcast, monotoned, seemingly covered in a sort of pinkish-complected skin, like an unboiled wiener."

In a September 1996 response to critics of his star ratings, Shepherd asserted that readers too often misunderstand his intent ("The context is everything"). A one-star rating does not mean "terrible" and a two-star rating, he suggests, is "a bit more cordial than the back of a hand."
