= Duncan Campbell (settler) =

Captain Duncan Campbell (1781 – 20 December 1856) was a Royal Marines officer and an 1820 British settler from Hampshire to Cape Colony having sailed on the Weymouth as a leader of a party numbering 28. His sister, Susan, who was 20 years old, accompanied him.

== Settlement and land work ==
The party was to occupy holdings on the Sonderend River, near the mission station of Genadendal, in the district of Caledon. They later moved to the Zuurveld.

He was appointed heemraad to assist the deputy-landdrost, Major Jones, at Grahamstown in 1820.

He ably assisted Jones as heemraad until his dismissal by Henry Rivers who was appointed landdrost of Grahamstown in place of Jones by Lord Charles Somerset. The dismissed settlers presented an address of appreciation and thanks to Major Jones.

In 1826 he was one of the settlers that began farming Merino and other types of woolled sheep. This industry proved profitable and grew to be the most important of all South Africa's farming activities around 1957.

== Commissioning posts ==
In 1827 he held the office of civil commissioner / resident magistrate at Grahamstown and Somerset East.

About 1 January 1828 Captain Campbell was appointed to the position of civil commissioner for the districts of Albany and Somerset East.

He held the position of Commissioner-General from 1833 to 1836 after his predecessor Stockenstrom resigned from the position. The position was abolished in 1836.

== War service ==
He especially distinguished himself during the sixth frontier war of 1835 and seventh frontier war of 1846–1847 as well as the eight frontier war.
