= Duncan Bowett =

Australian-born English cricketer

Personal information
- Full name: Duncan John Bowett
- Born: 7 December 1971 (age 54); Perth, Western Australia
- Batting: Right-handed
- Bowling: Right-arm medium

Domestic team information
- Years: Team
- 1995–2005: Shropshire

Career statistics
| Competition | List A |
|---|---|
| Matches | 3 |
| Runs scored | 32 |
| Batting average | 32.00 |
| 100s/50s | 0/0 |
| Top score | 11* |
| Balls bowled | 42 |
| Wickets | 0 |
| Bowling average | – |
| 5 wickets in innings | – |
| 10 wickets in match | – |
| Best bowling | – |
| Catches/stumpings | 0/– |
- Source: Cricinfo, 2 July 2011

Duncan John Bowett (born 7 December 1971) is an Australian-born former cricketer. Bowett played as a right-handed batsman who bowled right-arm medium pace deliveries. He was born in Perth, Western Australia.

Bowett, who was educated at Shrewsbury School, made his debut for Shropshire in the 1995 Minor Counties Championship against Berkshire. Bowett played Minor counties cricket for Shropshire from 1995 to 2005, which included 29 Minor Counties Championship appearances and 6 MCCA Knockout Trophy appearances. He made his List A debut against Sussex in the 1997 NatWest Trophy. He made 2 further List A appearances, against Warwickshire in the 2004 Cheltenham & Gloucester Trophy and Hampshire in the 2005 Cheltenham & Gloucester Trophy. In his 3 List A matches, he scored 32 runs, with 2 not outs which gave him an overall average of 32.00. With the ball, he bowled a total of 7 wicket-less overs.

During his play for Shropshire he played club cricket for Wroxeter.
