= Duncan Pratt =

English footballer and manager

Personal information
- Date of birth: 21 September 1958 (age 68)
- Position: Defender

Senior career*
Years	Team	Apps	(Gls)
1976–1979	Haarlem		
1979–1980	NEC		

Managerial career
- 2002: Fareham Town
- 2009: Fareham Town
- * Club domestic league appearances and goals

Duncan Pratt (born 21 September 1958) is an English former professional football player and manager. A defender, he played in the Netherlands for Haarlem and NEC. In April 2002 he left his position as manager of Fareham Town, and in June 2002 he began working for the marketing department of Spanish club Real Madrid. He later re-joined Fareham as manager, before again leaving in February 2009.
