= Duncan Fowles =

- Born: Duncan G. Fowles; 18 July 1893 Brisbane, Queensland
- Died: c. 1969
- University: University of Sydney

Rugby union career
- Position: hooker
International career
Years	Team	Apps	(Points)
1921–23	Wallabies	7	(0)

Duncan G. Fowles (18 July 1893– c. 1969) was a rugby union player who represented Australia.

Fowles, a hooker, was born in Brisbane, Queensland and claimed a total of 7 international rugby caps for Australia.
