= Duncan Dormor =

British Anglican priest (born 1967)

The Reverend Doctor Duncan Dormor
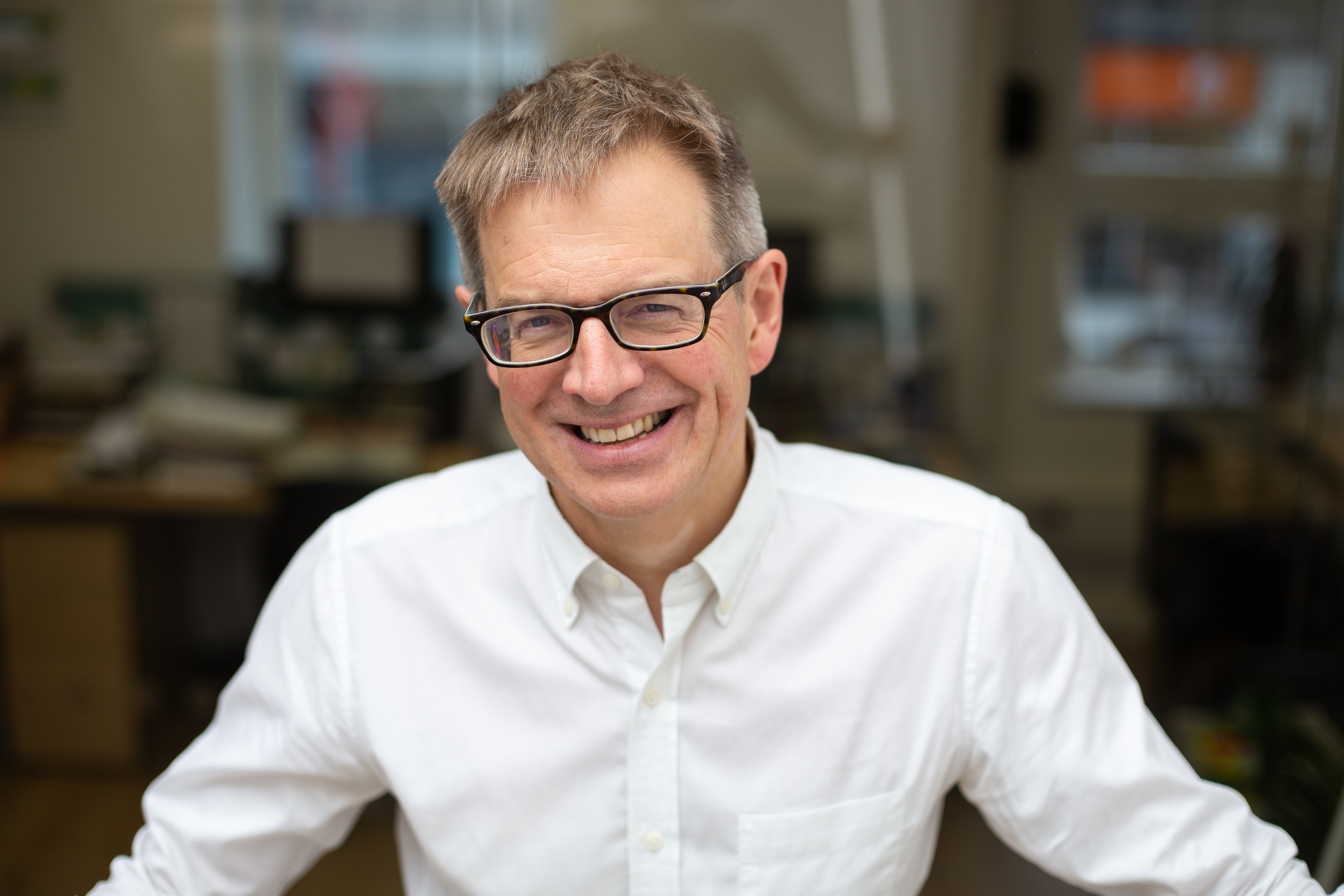

General Secretary of the United Society Partners in the Gospel
- Incumbent
- Assumed office February 2019
- Preceded by: Janette O’Neill

Personal details
- Born: Duncan James Dormor; 27 February 1967 (age 59)
- Education: Magdalen College, Oxford; London School of Hygiene & Tropical Medicine; Ripon College Cuddesdon

Ecclesiastical career
- Church: Church of England
- Ordained: 1995 (deacon); 1996 (priest)
- Congregations served: St John's College, Cambridge
- Offices held: Chaplain (1998–2002); Dean of Chapel (2002–2018)

Duncan James Dormor (born 27 February 1967) is a priest in the Church of England. Since January 2018, he has been the General Secretary of the United Society Partners in the Gospel, the Anglican mission agency founded in 1701. He was Dean of St John's College, Cambridge, from 2002 to 2017.

== Early life and career ==
Dormor studied Human Sciences (BA) at Magdalen College, Oxford, graduating in 1988, before studying for a Master of Science in Medical Demography at the London School of Hygiene and Tropical Medicine. Following this, he worked as an Information and Press Officer for the charity One Plus One Marriage and Partnership Research. He is married to Professor Catherine Dormor, Head of the School of Art, University of Westminster. They have two daughters.

== Ordained ministry ==
Dormor trained for ordination at Ripon College Cuddesdon studying for Theology (BA) at Magdalen College, Oxford, and was ordained a deacon in the Church of England in 1995 and as a priest in 1996. He served as a curate at St Peter’s Collegiate Church in the Parish of Central Wolverhampton within the Diocese of Lichfield from 1995 to 1998.

=== St John’s College, Cambridge ===
Dormor served as Chaplain of St John's College, Cambridge, from 1998 to 2002, when he was appointed Dean of Chapel. He served 15 years as Dean and was succeeded by the Rev'd Canon Mark Oakley in 2018. From 2011 to 2015, Dormor served as the elected President of the College. Dormor taught anthropology and sociology of religion in the Faculty of Divinity and represented Cambridge University on the General Synod of the Church of England from 2005–2015. He was a Trustee of the Churches Conservation Trust from 2013 to 2019

In 2017 with Andrew Nethsingha, he set up a new recording label, ‘St John’s Cambridge’, in conjunction with Signum. Nethsingha’s first album on the new label, DEO (music by Jonathan Harvey), was a 2017 BBC Music Magazine Award winner. During his time at Cambridge, Dormor published on issues of gender and sexuality. In 2021 he was awarded a PhD by publication in sociology of religion at Kingston University.

=== USPG ===
In 2018, Dormor was appointed General Secretary of USPG, succeeding Janette O’Neill who retired after serving six years in the role. He was commissioned by the Most Reverend Justin Welby, Archbishop of Canterbury at a service at Lambeth Palace on 12 February 2019. He is a Trustee of the Anglican Communion Fund and the Overseas Bishoprics Fund, as well as the Society for Advancing the Christian Faith. He is also a member of the Mission Theology & Apologetics Group of Churches Together in Britain and Ireland.

As General Secretary of USPG, Dormor has taken part in difficult conversations around subjects such as the idea of the White savior complex. He is also on the Editorial Board of Modern Believing, the journal of Modern Church.

== Bibliography ==
=== Key publications ===
- Dormor, Duncan. Special Issue: Postcolonial Theology, 'Modern Believing', (2021), 62.4. ISSN 1353-1425.
- Dormor, Duncan. ‘Intersex in the Christian Tradition: Personhood and Embodiment’ in The Legal Status of Intersex Persons, Eds. J. Sherpe, A. Dutta and T. Helms, (2018). Cambridge: Intersentia, pp. 103–164. ISBN 978-1-78068-475-8.
- Dormor, Duncan; Harris, Alana (eds). Evanglii Gaudium, Pope Francis and the Renewal of the Church (2017). Mahwah, NJ: Paulist Press. ISBN 9780809153671.
- Dormor, Duncan. ‘Transsexuality and the Christian Church: An Overview’ in The Legal Status of Transsexual and Transgender Persons, Ed. J. Sherpe, (2015). Cambridge:Intersentia, pp. 27–76. ISBN 978-1-78068-196-2.
- Dormor, Duncan; Morris, Jeremy (eds). An Acceptable Sacrifice? Homosexuality and the Church (2007). London: SPCK. ISBN 9780281058518.
- Dormor, Duncan. Just Cohabiting: The Church, Sex and Getting Married (2004) London: DLT. 9780232524840.
- Dormor, Duncan; Macdonald, Jack and Caddick, Jeremy (eds). Anglicanism: The Answer to Modernity (2003). (2003). London: Continuum. ISBN 9780826466990.
