= Duncan Green (aid expert) =

Duncan Green is Senior Strategic Adviser at Oxfam GB and Professor in Practice in International Development at the London School of Economics.

== Previous employment ==
Previous jobs include Head of Research at Oxfam GB, Senior Policy Adviser on Trade and Development at the Department for International Development (DFID). He was responsible for looking at trade in goods. His post at DFID was originally a secondment from CAFOD. At CAFOD he had been their trade and globalization Policy Analyst. He has also been Head of Research and Engagement at the Just Pensions project, a member of an advisory board member to the Globalisation and Poverty Programme (www.gapresearch.org) and a board member of the Ethical Trading Initiative.

== Publications ==
He has authored many books and articles including:

- How Change Happens (2016)
- From Poverty to Power: How Active Citizens and Effective States can Change the World (2008)
- Rethinking Tropical Agricultural Commodities (with Ian Gillson and others, DFID);
- Fostering Pro-sustainable Development Agriculture Trade Reform: Strategic Options Facing Developing Countries (with Jamie Morrison, ICTSD, 2004)
- Silent Revolution: The Rise and Crisis of Market Economics in Latin America (2003)
- The Northern WTO Agenda on Investment: Do as we say, not as we did (with Ha Joon Chang, South Centre/CAFOD, June, 2003)
- Dumping on the Poor: The Common Agricultural Policy, the WTO and International Development (with Matthew Griffith, CAFOD, September, 2002)
- Capital Punishment: Making International Finance Work for the World's Poor (CAFOD, September, 2001)
- Faces of Latin America (1997)
