= Duncan Martindale =

English cricketer (born 1963)

Personal information
- Full name: Duncan John Richardson Martindale
- Born: 13 December 1963 (age 62); Harrogate, Yorkshire, England
- Batting: Right-handed
- Bowling: Right-arm off break

Domestic team information
- Years: Team
- 1992–1993: Herefordshire
- 1985–1991: Nottinghamshire

Career statistics
Competition	First-class	List A
Matches	55	19
Runs scored	1,861	343
Batting average	24.81	26.38
100s/50s	4/7	–/1
Top score	138	53
Balls bowled	12	–
Wickets	–	–
Bowling average	–	–
5 wickets in innings	–	–
10 wickets in match	–	–
Best bowling	–	–
Catches/stumpings	23/–	5/–
- Source: Cricinfo, 22 August 2011

Duncan John Richardson Martindale (born 13 December 1963) is a former English cricketer. Martindale was a right-handed batsman who bowled right-arm off break. He was born in Harrogate, Yorkshire.

Martindale made his first-class debut for Nottinghamshire against Yorkshire in the 1985 County Championship. He made 54 further first-class appearances, the last of which came against Oxford University in 1991. In his 55 first-class appearances, he scored 1,861 runs at an average of 24.81, with seven fifties and four centuries. His highest first-class score of 138 came against Cambridge University in 1990. He made his List A debut for the county in the final of the 1985 NatWest Trophy against Essex at Lord's, which Essex won by a single run, despite an unbeaten 20 by Martindale in Nottinghamshire's chase. He made a further 18 List A appearances for the county, the last of which came against Worcestershire in the 1990 Benson & Hedges Cup. In his 19 List A matches, he scored 343 at an average of 26.38, with a high score of 53. This score, his only List A fifty, came against Northamptonshire in the 1989 Refuge Assurance League. He left Nottinghamshire at the end of the 1991 season.

For the 1992 season he joined Herefordshire, making his debut against Shropshire in the MCCA Knockout Trophy. He played Minor counties cricket for Herefordshire in 1992 and 1993, making seven Minor Counties Championship appearances and three in the MCCA Knockout Trophy.

== Personal life ==
His son Ben made his List A debut for Notts during the 2022 season in the Royal London Cup.
