= Duncan Horton =

English footballer

Personal information
- Date of birth: 18 February 1967 (age 59)
- Place of birth: Maidstone, England
- Position: Left back

Youth career
- –1984: Charlton Athletic

Senior career*
Years	Team	Apps	(Gls)
1984–1985	Charlton Athletic	1	(0)
1985–1987	Maidstone United	71	(0)
1987–1991	Welling United	142	(1)
1991–1993	Barnet	61	(3)
1993–1994	Wycombe Wanderers	15	(0)
1994–1998	Welling United	136	(0)
1998–2000	Ashford Town	54	(1)
- * Club domestic league appearances and goals

Duncan Horton (born 18 February 1967) is an English footballer who played as a left back and made 73 appearances in the Football League for Charlton Athletic, Barnet and Wycombe Wanderers.

== Career ==
Horton joined Charlton Athletic from school and played one Football League match in Division Two for the club before, in September 1985 aged 18, signing with Alliance Premier League club Maidstone United. In January 1987 he was placed on the Maidstone's transfer list but continued playing with them until the end of the 1986–87 season (in the Football Conference as the Alliance Premier League had become known), appearing in a total of 71 matches for the club. In the close season, in July 1987, Horton was transferred for a £2,500 fee to Welling United also of the Football Conference.

After almost four seasons with Welling United clocking-up 142 appearances, in March 1991 Horton was transferred for a £25,000 fee to Barnet, who were competing for the Football Conference championship, but only appeared in four games (including two as substitute) for his new team that season. Barnet achieved promotion to League Division Four for the 1991–92 season in which Horton started 24 games and was a used substitute in a further five. In March 1993 with the club at the top of Division Three (as the previously known Division Four was now designated owing to the advent of the Premier League) a financial crisis at the club saw club captain Horton, as the players PFA representative, involved in discussions over unpaid wages with the club chairman Stan Flashman. In a dramatic day on 31 March 1993 both Horton and team manager Barry Fry were sacked and then reinstated as the chairman Flashman himself resigned. The club survived and finished the season in the promotion positions in the league table, however, Horton had played his final game for Barnet on 20 March 1993, his 28th of their 32 league matches to date. He next signed with Division Three newcomers Wycombe Wanderers for the 1993–94 season, but suffered an injury in February 1994 and made only 15 appearances for the team, who were promoted at the end of the season.

Horton left Wycombe Wanderers (and the Football League) during the summer of 1994 and signed with his former club Welling United, who had remained in the Football Conference. He played with them for four seasons from the 1994–95 season until the 1997–98 season, appearing in 136 matches. Horton next signed with Southern League Southern Division club Ashford Town for the 1998–99 season, in which he played in 35 league matches, scoring on his debut. He spent the following 1999–2000 season with the same club (in the now newly named Eastern Division), although owing to missing first team games between mid-September 1999 and mid-January 2000 (after which he was almost ever-present), he played in only nineteen league matches.
