= Duncan Macpherson (photographer) =

Scottish photographer (1882–1966)

Duncan Macpherson FSA Scot (24 May 1882 – 8 September 1966) was a Scottish photographer, noted for his photographs of every-day life in the Highlands and Islands of Scotland.

== Family ==
Macpherson was born in Glenquithal, Aberdeenshire, the son of Neil Macpherson, a shepherd, and Janette (née Mackenzie). On 25 April 1916 he married Margaret MacIver, a chemist's assistant. They had two children, Neil and Mary.

== Life and work ==
In 1912 Macpherson opened a pharmacy in Kyle of Lochalsh, which still serves the local community, but he is probably best known for his local guidebooks and, in particular, the photographs in which he recorded every-day scenes of the West Highlands and Islands. It has been said of his photographs that, “His unique and valuable collection is little known outside the area, but yet must rank as one of the most significant photographic archives in the country.”

From 1927 to 1960 Macpherson published an annual “Vest Pocket Guide to Skye and Lochalsh”. His individual publications included:

- Gateway to Skye (E.Mackay, Stirling, 1946)
- Lure of the West (E.Mackay, Stirling, 1950)
- Where I belong (G&W Fraser, Aberdeen, 1964)

A collection of Macpherson's photographs is kept in the Skye and Lochalsh Archive Centre.
