= Duncan James (Australian singer) =

- Origin: Brisbane, Australia
- Genres: Pop
- Occupation(s): Singer, songwriter
- Instrument(s): Vocals, guitar
- Years active: 2003–04
- Labels: BMG

Duncan James is an Australian singer born in Brisbane, Australia, who was signed to BMG and is best known for his single "The Speed of Life" from the same titled album.

== Discography ==
=== Albums ===
List of studio albums
Title	Album details
The Speed of Life	Released: 2003; Label: Sony BMG (82876549292); Format: CD

=== Singles ===
List of singles, with year released and selected chart positions
Title	Year	Peak chart positions	Album
Title	Year	AUS	Album
"The Speed of Life"	2003	95	The Speed of Life
"She's a Satellite"	2003	—	The Speed of Life
