= Duncan Fraser (moderator) =

Moderator of the General Assembly of the Church of Scotland

Duncan Fraser JP
- Minister of Invergordon Kirk
- Church: Church of Scotland
- Installed: 1929
- Term ended: 1967
- Other post: Moderator of the General Assembly of the Church of Scotland (1964–1965)

Personal details
- Born: 7 August 1903 Bracadale, Scotland
- Died: 16 September 1977 (aged 74)
- Education: Portree High School; University of Edinburgh (MA)

Duncan Fraser JP (7 August 1903–16 September 1977) was Moderator of the General Assembly of the Church of Scotland from 1964 to 1965.

== Biography ==
Fraser was born in Bracadale on 7 August 1903, educated at Portree High School and the University of Edinburgh. He was Minister of Invergordon Kirk from 1929 to 1967; and a Naval Chaplain at the nearby shore base. Fraser died on 16 September 1977, aged 74.
