= Duncan Joseph Greenwood =

British scientist (1932–2010)

Duncan Joseph Greenwood CBE FRS
- Born: 16 October 1932
- Died: 13 February 2010 (aged 77)

Academic background
- Education: Aberdeen University

Duncan Joseph Greenwood CBE FRS (16 October 1932 — 13 February 2010) was a British plant and agricultural scientist whose research included soil aeration and plant nutrition.

Greenwood attended Aberdeen University, graduating with a PhD in Soil Science in 1957.

He served as president of the International Committee of Plant Nutrition (1978-1982) and the British Society of Soil Science (1990-1992). He was elected Fellow of the Royal Society in 1985, and was appointed a CBE in 1993.
