= Duncan Waite =

American professor of education (born 1952)

Duncan Waite (born November 27, 1952) is professor of education and community leadership at Texas State University. He is editor of The International Journal of Leadership in Education and director of the International Center for Educational Leadership and Social Change. He received and M.A. and his Ph.D. in Curriculum and Supervision from the University of Oregon. He received his B.A. from the University of Michigan with teaching credentials from Michigan State University. His professional affiliations include the American Educational Research Association (AERA) and Council of Professors of Instructional Supervision (COPIS). He has served on the following editorial boards: Educar, International Studies in Educational Administration, Investigación Administrativa, Journal of Teacher Education, Scholar-Practitioner Quarterly, ScholarlyPartnershipsEdu, Senzor, The Journal of Creativity in Mental Health, The Turkish Journal of Educational Administration (Egitim Yonetimi), World Studies in Education. Duncan Waite's research includes issues in educational leadership, educational policy, instructional supervision and curriculum. As a recognized international scholar, Waite's work includes publication in Spain, Turkey, Russia, and Portugal. He has been invited to deliver the keynote address at conferences in Russia, Norway, Spain, Chile, Scotland, Turkey, Portugal, and Australia.

Before his appointment as a professor of education and community leadership at Texas State University, he served as a professor at the University of Georgia and Appalachian State University, where he was also the Director of the Ph.D. program in Reich College of Education within the Department of Leadership and Educational Studies. His honors and awards include the Visiting Professor/International Research Associate award from University of Warwick (UK), the College of Education Excellence in Teaching Award at The University of Georgia, and both teaching and research awards from his current institution. His pedagogical approach to teaching qualitative methods engages his students. An example of Waite's novel approach to teaching qualitative research includes a simple deck of playing cards, Waite uses a kinesthetic technique to have his students explore qualitative research concepts (written up and published as an article in Qualitative Inquiry).

In his research endeavors, he has explored the application of anthropological and sociological perspectives and methods to educational leadership, educational policy, instructional supervision, and curriculum, including school/organizational contexts, teacher-supervisor conferences, the theory of supervision and leadership, corruption and abuse of power in educational administration and their relation to educational bureaucratic structures and hierarchies. Currently he is writing an oral life-history of a recently deceased Southern African-American school principal. He served as the Principal Investigator for The Georgia Initiative, Alternative Elementary Teacher Education Program at the University of Georgia. He is an expert in qualitative methods who was trained by Harry Wolcott a pioneer in the field of educational anthropology( a student of George Spindler at Stanford University while at the University of Oregon. Currently he is exploring the theory of imperial hubris and has written an article, Imperial Hubris: The dark heart of leadership, soon to appear in, among other places, the Journal of School Leadership. His recent work has focused on corruption and corporativism (an outgrowth of neoliberalism, and corporatism). In, Imperial Hubris: The dark heart of leadership, Waite explores corruption and corporativism in the ontological form (as distinguished from mere corporatism).

Waite's explorations of corruption and abuse of power in educational administration in K–12 and higher education institutions are important, though neglected, research topics. In Corruption and Abuse of Power in Educational Administration he begins to uncover the range, if not the depth, of such corruption and abuse of power as represented in an initial ethnology of the topic. Examples are taken from several countries, most notably Mexico, China, and the United States, and discussion revolves around the relation between corruption and hierarchical, pyramidal bureaucracies.

== Selected publications ==
2010. “Preparing Educational Leaders to Serve a Democratic Society. ” Scholar-Practitioner Quarterly, 4(4), 367-370.

2010. Waite, D. & Waite, S. F. “Corporatism and its Corruption of Democracy and Education.” Journal of Education and Humanities, 1(2), 86-106.

2010. “On the Shortcomings of our Organizational Forms: With Implications for Educational Change and School Improvement. ” School Leadership and Management, 30(3), 225-248.

2009. “Looking Anew at Organizations and Other Forms of Association: With Implications for Schools and Educational Leadership.” Education and Society, 27(2)

2009. “No es Cuestión de Datos. La Evolución de un Currículo de Supervisión Clínica y la Pedagogía.” (“It’s not About the Data: The Evolution of a Clinical Supervision Curriculum and Pedagogy.”) Educar, 44, 67-78.

2009. “LDR 2 LDR: University Faculty Communicating Practice through Theory.” Journal of Leadership Studies, 3(2), 56-57.

2009. “Teaching Theory: A Response to Nelson, Henry, Holcomb, Guajardo, and Jenlink.” Journal of Leadership Studies, 3, 79-83.

2007. “Schooling, Social Justice and the Role of the State.” Investigación Administrativa, No. 100, 7-12. 2007. Waite, D., Moos, L., Sugrue, C., & Liu, Cungang. “Framing Education: A Conceptual Synthesis of the Major Social Institutional Forces Affecting Education.” Education and Society, 25(3), 5-33.

2007. Waite, D., Nelson, S. W., & Guajardo, M. “Teaching and Leadership for Social Justice and Social Responsibility: The Struggle Begins at Home.” Journal of Educational Administration and Foundations, 18 (1&2), 200-223.

2006. Waite, D., Waite, S. F. & Fillion, S. “Duplicity, Democracy and Domesticity: Educational Leadership for Democratic Action.” In K. Cooper & R. White (eds.), The Practical Critical Educator: Critical Inquiry and Educational Practice (pp. 137–149). Dordrecht, The Netherlands: Springer.

2005. Waite, D., & Nelson, S. W. “Una Revisión del Liderazgo Educativo” ("Educational Leadership Reconsidered."). La Revista Española de Pedagogía, 63(232), 389-406.

2005. Waite, D., Moos, L. & Lew, C. "Globalization, Higher Education, Educational Leadership and Policy Change." In J. Zadja (ed.) The International Handbook on Globalization, Education, and Policy Research (pp. 279–292). Dordrecht, The Netherlands: Springer.

Waite, D. & Allen, D. (in press). "Corruption and Democracy in Educational Leadership." In P. Jenlink (ed.), Democracy and Education Reconsidered: Critical Perspectives on Educational Leadership for the New Millennium. Lanham, MD: Scarecrow Education.

2003. Waite, D., & Allen, D. “Corruption and Abuse of Power in Educational Administration.” The Urban Review, 35(4), 281-296.

2002. "Is the Role of the Principal in Creating School Improvement Over-Rated?" Journal of Educational Change, 3(2), 161-165.

2002. “ The Culture(s) of Educational Leadership: Troubling Times and Spaces.” Scholar-Practitioner Quarterly, 1(2), 25-39.

2002. “Critical New Directions in Educational Leadership.” Education and Society, 20(1), 29-42.

2002. “ The Paradigm Wars’ in Educational Administration: An Attempt at Transcendence.” International Studies in Educational Administration, 30 (1), 66-78.

Waite, D., Boone, M., & McGhee, M. 2001. " A Critical Sociocultural View of Accountability " Journal of School Leadership, 11, 182-203.

2000. "Identity, Authority, and the Heart of Supervision." International Journal of Educational Reform, 9(4), 282-291.

2000. "The World(s) of Educational Leadership." World Studies in Education, 1(1), 79-98.

Waite, D. & Ramires Fernandes, M. 2000. "Complicity in Supervision: Another Postmodern Moment." In J. Glanz and L. S. Behar-Horenstein (eds.), Paradigm Debates in Curriculum and Supervision: Modern and Postmodern Perspectives (pp. 190–211). Westport, CT: Bergin & Garvey.

Waite, D. & Fishman, L. 1999. "Obrazovanie Pered Vyzovami Epohi Postmodernizma" ("Education and the Challenges of the Postmodern Epoch"). In Informacionnye Tehnologii v Obrazovatel'nom Processe (Information Technology in the Educational Process) (pp. 32–40). Samara, Russia: Samara State Pedagogical University Press.

1998. "Anthropology, Sociology, and Supervision." In G. R. Firth and E. Pajak (eds.), Handbook of Research in School Supervision (pp. 287–309). New York: MacMillan.

Recent Papers and Keynotes*: 2011, January. “Las Universidades y Sus Facultades como ‘Mercaderes de la Luz’: Reflexión sobre la Universidad actual.” (“Universities and Their Faculties as ‘Merchants of Light’: Contemplation on Today’s University”). Keynote address given to the meeting of the Comisión Nacional de Acreditación CAN-Chile and Fundación Creando Futuro, Santiago, Chile.

2008, December. “Las Limitaciones de Nuestras Formas Ogranizativas” (“On the Shortcomings of Our Organizational Forms”). Closing keynote address given to the X Congreso Interuniversitario de Ogranización de Instituciones Educativas, Barcelona, Spain.

2008, December. “Tendencias en los Estudios de Liderazgo Educativo en el Ámbito Anglosajón.” (“Trends in Educational Leadership Research in the English-Speaking World.”). Invited symposium given to the X Congreso Interuniversitario de Ogranización de Instituciones Educativas, Barcelona, Spain.

2008, December. “Simposio Sobre los Estudios de Gestión y Organización Escolar” (“Symposium on Research in School Improvement and Organization”). The University of Granada, Granada, Spain.

2007, December. “Rethinking Education, Schooling, Social Justice and the Role of the State.” Keynote given to Egitimciler Birligi Sendikası/Egitim-Bir-Sen, Ankara, The Republic of Turkey.

2001, December. "Corrupción y el Abuso de Poder en la Administación Educativa." Keynote address given to the VI Jornadas Andaluzas de Organización de Instituciones Educativas, Granada Facultad de Ciencias de la Educación, University of Granada, Spain.

2001, December. "Corrupción y el Abuso de Poder en la Administación Educativa." Lecture given to the College of Education, University of Córdoba, Spain.

2001, May. "Critical, New Directions in Educational Leadership in the US." Lecture given to The Scottish Association for Educational Management and Administration, The University of Glasgow, and the Glasgow City Council, Glasgow, Scotland (UK).

2002, April. "Journal Editors‚ Perspectives on Writing for Publication." Roundtable presented to the annual meeting of the American Educational Research Association, New Orleans, Louisiana.

2002, April. Mentor and discussant for D. Y. Bruner and B. J. Greenlee, "Comprehensive School Reform Design and Effects." Mentoring roundtable presented to the annual meeting of the American Educational Research Association, New Orleans.

2001, November. "Corruption and Abuse of Power in Educational Administration." Paper presented to the annual meeting of the University Council for Educational Administration, Cincinnati, Ohio.

2001, April. "Discourse Theory as a Research Model that Bridges The Paradigm Wars." Paper presented to the annual meeting of the American Educational Research Association, Seattle, Washington.

2000, April. "Culture and Educational Leadership: Their Troubled and Troubling Times and Spaces." Paper presented to the annual meeting of the American Educational Research Association, New Orleans, Louisiana.
