= Duncan Greenwood =

English playwright

Duncan Greenwood (1919–1992) was an English playwright.

His plays include Cat among the Pigeons, Murder Delayed and No Time for Figleaves.
