= Duncan Harris =

Australian rules footballer (born 1941)

Personal information
- Full name: Duncan Harris
- Born: 27 April 1941 (age 85)
- Original team: University Blacks / Scotch College
- Height: 185 cm (6 ft 1 in)
- Weight: 83 kg (183 lb)

Playing career^{1}
Years	Club	Games (Goals)
1962	Hawthorn	1 (0)
- ^{1} Playing statistics correct to the end of 1962.

Duncan Harris (born 27 April 1941) is a former Australian rules footballer who played with Hawthorn in the Victorian Football League (VFL).
