= Duncan Moodie =

Australian rules footballer

Personal information
- Full name: Duncan Cameron Moodie
- Born: 7 May 1897; Geelong, Victoria
- Died: 18 April 1960 (aged 62); Mornington, Victoria
- Height: 179 cm (5 ft 10 in)
- Weight: 82 kg (181 lb)

Playing career^{1}
Years	Club	Games (Goals)
1918	Geelong	12 (0)
1923	St Kilda	4 (3)
Total		16 (3)
- ^{1} Playing statistics correct to the end of 1923.

Duncan Cameron Moodie (7 May 1897 – 18 April 1960) was an Australian rules footballer who played with Geelong and St Kilda in the Victorian Football League (VFL).
