= Duncan Johnston (songwriter) =

Scottish songwriter (1881–1947)

Duncan Johnston (1881–1947), also Duncan Johnstone or Donnachadh MacIain in Scottish Gaelic, was a songwriter from Islay, Scotland, UK. He is best known for his 1938 book Cronan nan Tonn (The Croon of the Sea). The Royal National Mòd has an annual prize, the Duncan Johnston Trophy, named after him. Johnston, along with Charles MacNiven (1874–1944), Duncan MacNiven (1880–1955), and William Livingston (1808–1870), is one of the Islay Bards.
