= Duncan Lindsay (Australian footballer) =

Australian rules footballer, born 1902

Personal information
- Full name: Duncan Lindsay
- Born: 4 April 1902; Footscray, Victoria
- Died: 8 September 1967 (aged 65); West Melbourne, Victoria
- Height: 178 cm (5 ft 10 in)
- Weight: 71 kg (157 lb)

Playing career^{1}
| Years | Club | Games (Goals) |
| 1925–26 | North Melbourne | 27 (31) |
- ^{1} Playing statistics correct to the end of 1926.

Duncan Lindsay (4 April 1902 – 8 September 1967) was an Australian rules footballer who played with North Melbourne in the Victorian Football League (VFL).
