= Duncan McMillan (footballer) =

Scottish footballer

Duncan MacMillan
Personal information
- Full name: Duncan MacMillan
- Date of birth: 18 January 1922
- Place of birth: Glasgow, Scotland
- Date of death: 20 May 1992 (aged 70)
- Place of death: Grimsby, England
- Height: 5 ft 11 in (1.80 m)
- Position: Defender

Youth career
- Maryhill Harp

Senior career*
Years	Team	Apps	(Gls)
1946–1949	Celtic	18	(0)
1949–1954	Grimsby Town	188	(2)
1954–1955	Dundee United	1	(0)
Total		207	(2)
- * Club domestic league appearances and goals

Duncan McMillan (18 January 1922 – 20 May 1992) was a Scottish professional footballer who played as a defender.
