= Duncan Barber =

Welsh businessman, RAF ambassador (born 1945)

Duncan Barber OBE, FRAeS
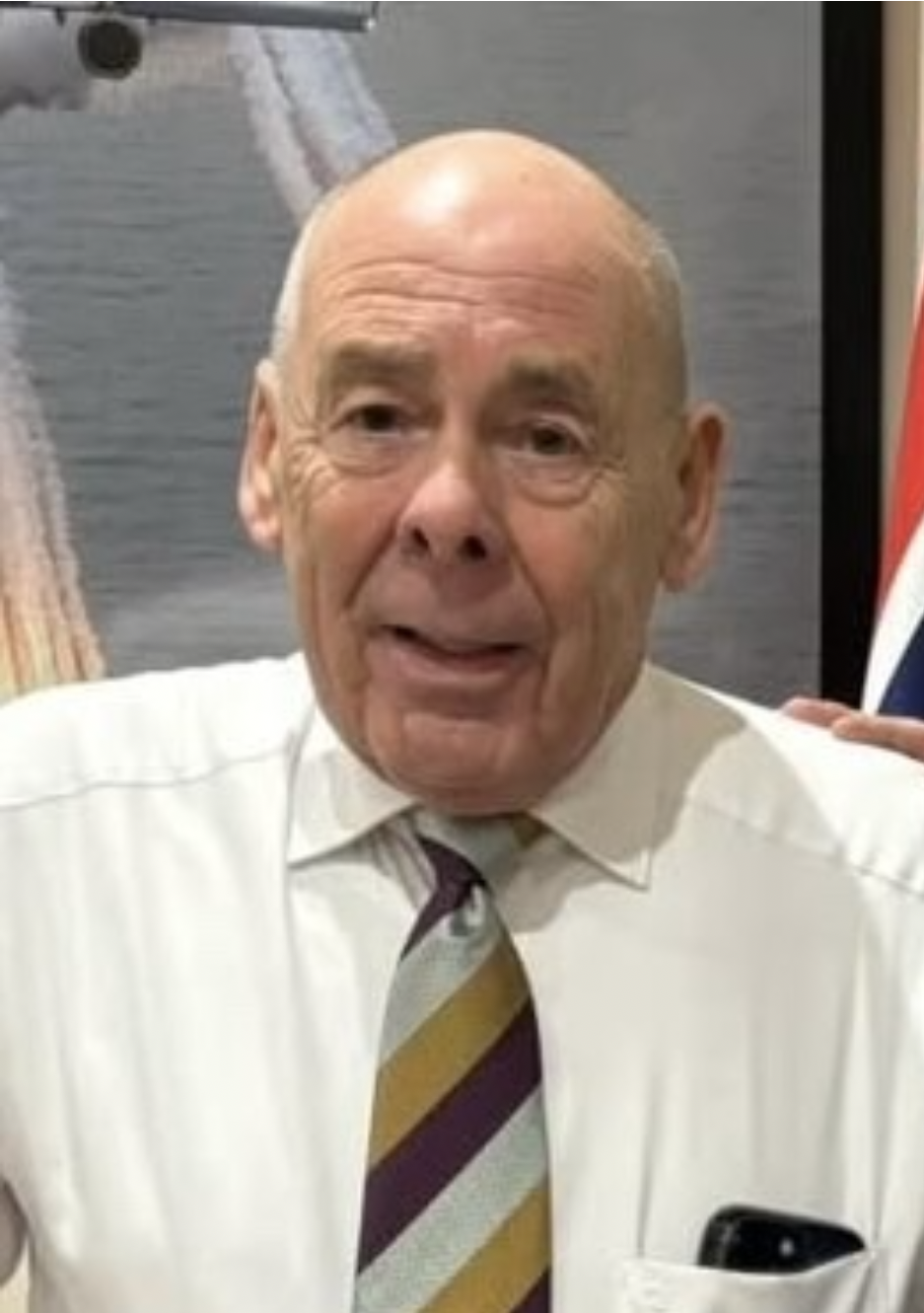
- Barber in 2023
- Born: April 1945 (age 80)
- Occupations: Engineer, Businessman
- Known for: Founding Aircraft Maintenance Support Services
- Children: 2
- Honours: OBE for services to the defence industry

Duncan Roy Barber, OBE, FRAeS (born April 1945) is a Welsh businessman, RAF ambassador, and founder of Aircraft Maintenance Support Services.

== Aircraft Maintenance Support Services ==
In 1978, Barber founded Aircraft Maintenance Support Services (AMSS), which has since become one of the largest family-run enterprises in Europe, and specialises in the design and manufacture of military and civilian aircraft Ground Support Equipment. Throughout his forty year tenure of the company, Barber formed partnerships with the likes of the Royal Australian Air Force, the US Department of Defence, the Japanese Defence Agency, NATO, the United Nations, BAE Systems and Boeing. The client portfolio comprised major airlines, including British Airways, United Airlines, Korean Air and Etihad.

In an interview, Barber stated AMSS's "origins lie in the Port Talbot-based heating and refrigeration business his father started".

Referring to his father, Barber explained:

He was responsible for looking after Benson heaters and working with him, on these, led to my winning a contract to heat a hangar at Rhoose Airport which was used by Cambrian Airways. I had wanted to become involved with aircraft and aero engines and it provided me with the introduction to the world of aeronautics. Within a short space of time I was heating hangars in several regional airports, which was a vastly different experience to the daily job of repairing fridges.

In the 1980s, Barber began designing an aircraft heater in his garage on request of British Airways. Despite ordering ten of Barber's heaters, BA closed its regional division and the heaters became surplus equipment. In 1982, at the outbreak of the Falklands War, Barber agreed a contract with the Ministry of Defence to supply his heaters, after having read in a newspaper that the RAF planned to use American heaters. Barber claimed that the contract was worth £75,000. (Note: £75,000 in 1982 equates to approximately £334,000 in 2023, according to calculations based on the Consumer Price Index measure of inflation.)

As of 2017, the business was based at the Village Farm Industrial Estate, Pyle, employing 125 staff. In the same year, AMSS was purchased by JBT corporation for £10,000,000, who retained the Welsh factory and all staff. Barber remarked that JBT was an organisation he had "respected for years", adding "I have no doubt that this will strengthen the future opportunities for AMSS in Wales". Barber's son, (Kieran) Scott Barber, continues as managing director of AMSS.

== Personal life ==
Barber was educated at Dyffryn Grammar School, Port-Talbot, left with no qualifications, and went on to train as an engineer. As of 2008, his personal fortune was estimated at £28,000,000. (Note: £28,000,000 in 2008 equates to approximately £47,195,000 in 2023, according to calculations based on the Consumer Price Index measure of inflation.) Barber is "self-made" by his own admission, washing cars since the age of thirteen. He now lives in Llandough with his partner Jane, and has two adult children. Barber is a car enthusiast, a passion which he states stems from his interest in engineering. He owns a large collection of modern and classic cars, which at one point included eleven Ferraris. Barber told Wales Online “Ferraris are my passion. They are the best cars; they fit like a glove. I don't have time to drive them but I like to have them and to show people.”

Barber is a Fellow of the Royal Aeronautical Society (FRAeS), Ambassador of the RAF Museum and trained Royal Air forces Association (RAFA) Befriender. Barber also privately supports RAF Sport, the Royal Airforce Benevolent Fund (RAFB), and various RAF Charities, while liaising with the Royal Air Force Air Cadets (RAFAC) in his local area. Barber also volunteers in the RAF Association's Connections for Life service, providing support to those in need within the RAF community.

As of 2004, Barber was a member of Club Fiorano, which ran track-day opportunities to drive competition-class Ferraris. Interviewed by The Telegraph, Barber stated "I was one of the first to join when it started six years ago... Club Fiorano is my train set". The Times reported Barber as "one of the club's most avid supporters".

In 2019, Barber was recipient of the Queen's Commission, succeeding to the rank of Honorary Group Captain within 601 Squadron RAuxAF. Barber was named in the 2024 New Years Honours, and was appointed Officer of the Order of the British Empire (OBE) for his services to the defence industry.
