= Duncan MacGregor (footballer) =

Australian rules footballer

Personal information
- Full name: Duncan MacGregor
- Born: 25 March 1952 (age 74)
- Original team: Noble Park
- Height: 183 cm (6 ft 0 in)
- Weight: 76 kg (168 lb)

Playing career^{1}
Years	Club	Games (Goals)
1971	South Melbourne	1 (0)
- ^{1} Playing statistics correct to the end of 1971.

Duncan MacGregor (born 25 March 1952) is a former Australian rules footballer who played with South Melbourne in the Victorian Football League (VFL).
