= Duncan Pauline =

Scottish cricketer (born 1960)

Personal information
- Born: 15 December 1960 (age 65); Aberdeen, Scotland
- Batting: Right-handed
- Bowling: Right-arm medium

Career statistics
Competition	First-class	List A
Matches	61	48
Runs scored	2,258	768
Batting average	25.08	22.58
100s/50s	1/16	0/4
Top score	115	92
Balls bowled	1,126	792
Wickets	18	18
Bowling average	36.77	35.33
5 wickets in innings	1	0
10 wickets in match	0	0
Best bowling	5/52	3/34
Catches/stumpings	22/–	8/–
- Source: CricketArchive, 3 February 2023

Duncan Brian Pauline (born 15 December 1960) is a former Scottish cricketer who played with Surrey.

An all-rounder, Pauline joined Surrey in 1979, having played for Young England the previous year. The only century of his first-class career came against Sussex in 1983.

He spent 7 years at Surrey before moving to Glamorgan for one final season in the County Championship. Pauline then returned to Scotland and represented the national side in List A cricket.
