= Duncan Irschick =

American evolutionary ecologist

Duncan Irschick (born 1969 in San Francisco, California) is an evolutionary ecologist and functional morphologist in the field of animal athletics, more specifically known as animal performance. He has worked on many kinds of animal species, including reptiles and amphibians, rodents, ungulates, spiders, and humans. He was a faculty member at Tulane University for five years (2001–2006) before joining the faculty at the University of Massachusetts at Amherst in 2006.

== Early life ==
He earned his B.S. in Zoology from the University of California, Davis in 1991. He earned his Ph.D. from Washington University in St. Louis in 1996. He then went on to postdoctoral research at the University of Cincinnati and at the University of California, Berkeley. During this period, he expanded his research to functional themes, including studies of kinetics, and kinematics.

== Career ==
=== Research ===
Duncan Irschick is most well known for his work on gecko adhesion, and rapid evolution. He along with several colleagues, conducted the first test of how much force a gecko toepad could produce. Their recorded value of 20 Newtons of force for two front limbs for a Tokay gecko was a starting point for a large body of research on bioadhesion and synthetic production of gecko setae, which has captured significant attention in the public eye. In 2012, he, together with colleagues from the University of Massachusetts published a paper describing the invention of "Geckskin", which shows some elements of the anatomy of geckos, and for which a 100 cm^{2} piece can hold up to 700 lb on a smooth surface, yet can be peeled off with little effort, which was widely covered in the popular media.

In 2004, he, along with several other colleagues, completed a study showing that rapid evolution (36 years) of a major body part (a cecal valve of the intestinal tract in Croatian squamates can occur, apparently due to invasion of a novel island habitat. This study, published in the Proceedings of the National Academy of Sciences in 2008, has been presented as evidence for evolution in modern times.

=== Editorial ===
Duncan Irschick is a senior editor for the journal Functional Ecology and an associate editor for The Quarterly Review of Biology. He has served on several other editorial boards as a faculty member.

== Recognitions ==
He has been named as the Hilgendorf lecturer for the University of Tübingen in 2010, and as the OCIB lecturer for the University of Ottawa in 2008. He has been awarded several grants from the National Science Foundation and the National Institutes of Health.

== Publications (selected) ==
Irschick, D. J., Austin, C. C., Petren, K., Fisher, R. N., Losos, J. B., Ellers, O. 1996. A comparative analysis of clinging ability among pad-bearing lizards. Biological Journal of the Linnean Society 59:21-35

Irschick, D. J., Losos, J. B. 1998. A comparative analysis of the ecological significance of locomotor performance in Caribbean Anolis lizards. Evolution 52:219-226.

Irschick, D. J., VanHooydonck, B., Herrel, A., Androsceu, A. 2003. Effects of loading and size on maximum power output and kinematics in geckos. Journal of Experimental Biology. 206:3923-3934.

Irschick, D. J., Herrel, A., Vanhooydonck, B., Van Damme, R. 2007. A functional approach to sexual selection. Functional Ecology. 21:621-626.

Ramos, M., Irschick, D. J., Christenson, T. 2004. Overcoming an evolutionary conflict: Removal of a reproductive organ greatly enhances locomotor performance. Proceedings of the National Academy of Sciences. 101:4883-4887.

Herrel, A., Huyghe, K., Vanhooydonck, B., Backeljau, T., Breugelmans, K., Grbac, I., Van Damme, R., Irschick, D. J. 2008. Rapid large scale evolutionary divergence in morphology and performance associated with the exploitation of a novel dietary resource in the lizard Podarcis sicula. Proc. Natl. Acad. Sci. 105:4792-4795
