= Duncan MacGregor (rugby union) =

Scotland international rugby union player

- Born: Duncan MacGregor

Rugby union career
Amateur team(s)
Years	Team	Apps	(Points)
- Pontypridd RFC
International career
Years	Team	Apps	(Points)
1907	Scotland	3	

Duncan MacGregor was a Scottish rugby union player.

He was capped three times for Scotland in 1907. He also played for Pontypridd RFC in Wales.

He was the brother of John MacGregor who was also capped for Scotland.
