= Duncan J. D. Smith =

British travel writer

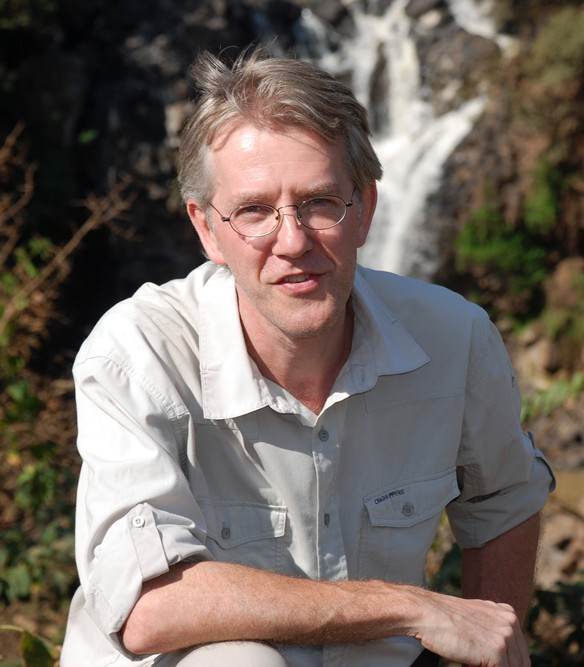
Born 1 December 1960, Sheffield, England, United Kingdom Occupation Travel writer, photographer, historian, explorer and publisher Nationality British Years active 1992–present Website Duncan J. D. Smith – The Urban Explorer

Duncan J. D. Smith FRGS (born 1 December 1960) is a British travel writer, photographer, historian, and explorer.

== Life and career ==
Smith was born in Sheffield, Yorkshire, England in 1960. Both his parents were librarians. His maternal grandfather was P.G.M. Dickinson, former Archivist of the County and Borough of Huntingdon. Dickinson rediscovered the town charters of Huntingdon in 1941. Smith's Scottish great-grandfather was Alexander James Smith, who was instrumental in establishing Chivas Regal as a global brand in the early twentieth century. Smith's great-great-grandfather was Henry Doman, the nineteenth century Lymington poet and friend of Coventry Patmore. His great-great-great-grandfather was Professor Charles Spooner of the Royal Veterinary College.

Educated in Sheffield, Smith simultaneously ran his own private museum. He then attended Birmingham University and studied Ancient History and Archaeology. Between 1985 and 2003 Smith worked in the publishing industry, during which time he wrote five local history books about Sheffield and Yorkshire, four of them with his late father Trevor Smith. His book Yorkshire: A Portrait in Colour (1995) published by The Dovecote Press remained in print for over fifteen years.

Since 2003 Smith has worked as a travel writer, photographer, historian, and explorer. He favours travelling off the beaten track in search of unusual places and people. His European findings are being self-published in an original series of books called Only In Guides under his The Urban Explorer imprint. Volumes include Berlin, Boston, Budapest, Cologne, Dubrovnik, Edinburgh, Hamburg, Krakow, London, Marseille, Munich, Paris, Prague, Seville, Tangier, Trieste, Vienna and Zurich (a volume on Athens is in preparation). Smith has also written for magazines such as Timeless Travels and Hidden Europe.

Smith's travels also encompass parts of Africa (including Ethiopia), the Middle East (including Syria and Jordan), and Asia (Sri Lanka).

In 2010 Smith was made a Fellow of the Royal Geographical Society.

Smith has been described as “the thinking man’s exploratory investigator”.

== Bibliography ==
South & West Yorkshire Curiosities (with Trevor Smith) (1992)
North & East Yorkshire Curiosities (with Trevor Smith) (1993)
Yorkshire – A Portrait in Colour (1995)
Sheffield Curiosities (with Trevor Smith) (1999)
More Sheffield Curiosities (with Trevor Smith) (2000)
Only in Vienna (2005)
Only in Budapest (2006)
Only in Prague (2008)
Only in Berlin (2008)
Only in Munich (2009)
Only in Hamburg (2010)
Only in Cologne (2011)
Only in Zurich (2012)
Only in Paris (2013)
Only in London (2015)
Only in Edinburgh (2016)
Only in Boston (2018)
Only in Krakow (2019)
Only in Seville (2021)
Only in Dubrovnik (2022)
Only in Trieste (2023)
Only in Marseille (2025)
Only in Tangier (2025)
Only in Athens (2026)
