= Duncan Leitch (geologist) =

Scottish geologist and palaeontologist (1904–1956)

Duncan Leitch FRSE FGS (1904 -1956) was a 20th-century Scottish geologist and palaeontologist. He specialised in Carboniferous stratigraphy.

== Life ==
He was born in Glasgow on 20 March 1904. He was educated at Woodside School in Glasgow. He then studied Science at Glasgow University drifting towards an interest in geology due to Prof John Walter Gregory. He graduated with First Class Honours BSc in Geology in 1926. He then became a Demonstrator in the Geology lectures, assisting Prof Gregory. He was granted a Carnegie Teaching Fellowship and in 1938 he began lecturing in his own right.

In 1946 he was elected a Fellow of the Royal Society of Edinburgh. His proposers were Arthur Trueman, John Weir, Thomas Alty and Sir Maurice Yonge. In 1947 he accepted a professorship at University College, Swansea in Wales. He had joined the Geological Society in 1928 and served as its Assistant Librarian until 1932. He became Secretary in 1937 and Chairman in 1947.

He died in Swansea on 11/12 January 1956.

== Publications ==
- Geology in the Life of Man (1948)
