= Duncan Graham (writer) =

Australian-trained journalist and blogger

Duncan Graham (born 1938 in England) is an Australian trained journalist and blogger.

He currently lives alternately in New Zealand and Indonesia. Formerly he lived and worked in Western Australia.

He is the author of books, earlier on Aboriginal issues in Western Australia, and more recently on Indonesia.

He worked for the Australian Broadcasting Corporation as a journalist, as well as teaching journalism.

In his earlier career he was an award winning journalist, and is currently a blogger on Indonesian affairs.
