= Duncan Smith (cricketer) =

English cricketer and Royal Air Force officer

Personal information
- Full name: Duncan Smith
- Born: Unknown
- Died: Unknown
- Batting: Unknown
- Bowling: Leg break

Career statistics
| Competition | First-class |
|---|---|
| Matches | 1 |
| Runs scored | 23 |
| Batting average | 11.50 |
| 100s/50s | –/– |
| Top score | 22 |
| Balls bowled | 66 |
| Wickets | 0 |
| Bowling average | – |
| 5 wickets in innings | – |
| 10 wickets in match | – |
| Best bowling | – |
| Catches/stumpings | –/– |
- Source: Cricinfo, 5 March 2019

Duncan Smith (dates of birth and death unknown) was an English first-class cricketer and Royal Air Force officer.

A member of the Royal Air Force, Smith was selected to play for the Combined Services cricket team in a first-class cricket match against Gloucestershire at Bristol in 1947. Batting twice in the match, Smith was dismissed for 22 runs by Sam Cook in the Combined Services first-innings, while in their second-innings he was dismissed for a single run by Monty Cranfield. With his leg break bowling, Smith bowled eleven wicketless overs in Gloucestershire's first-innings, conceding 50 runs.
