= Duncan Leitch (neurobiologist) =

American neurobiologist (born 1984)

Duncan Bernardo Leitch is a neurobiologist working at the University of California San Francisco. He was born in Memphis, Tennessee, in 1984. Leitch attended Vanderbilt University, where he gained recognition for his work on the integumentary sensory organs in crocodilians.

He has published many articles on star-nosed moles, naked mole-rats, and other insectivores.

In 2012, Kenneth C. Catania and Leitch published a study on the somatosensory sensation of crocodilians, including American alligators and Nile crocodiles in the Journal of Experimental Biology. This garnered public attention in the journals Nature, Science, National Geographic, and international news media. In this work, he and Catania describe the physiological response properties of neurons in the trigeminal ganglion, showing that the sense of touch in crocodilians surpasses those of human fingertips, despite being a thickly-scaled surface.

More recently, Leitch has led breakthrough studies in the field of electroreception, whereby he and his team characterized the molecular basis for electrosensation by sharks and skates
