= Duncan Smith (footballer) =

Scottish footballer (1929–2001)

Personal information
- Date of birth: 19 January 1929
- Place of birth: Glasgow, Scotland
- Date of death: 28 August 2001 (aged 72)
- Place of death: East Kilbride, Scotland
- Position: Inside forward

Senior career*
Years	Team	Apps	(Gls)
1951–1952	Dumbarton	48	(9)
1951–1952	Clyde		
1953–1956	Arbroath	74	(30)
1956–1957	Albion Rovers	17	(3)
- * Club domestic league appearances and goals

Duncan Smith (19 January 1929 – 28 August 2001) was a Scottish footballer who played in the 1950s. He began his professional career with Dumbarton, where he spent two seasons. During this spell he was selected to play for a Scottish B League XI against an Irish B League XI, where he scored a goal in the 6–0 win. Thereafter he played with Clyde, Arbroath and Albion Rovers. Following his football career, Duncan lived and worked as a machine tools operator in East Kilbride where he died after a short illness surrounded by his family.
