= Duncan McRae (designer) =

Duncan McRae (1919–1984) was an American industrial designer who spent the majority of his career designing automobiles. After spending a couple of summers working as a laborer and clay modeler for Ford Motor Company, McRae was hired as a designer at Kaiser-Frazier Corporation in September, 1949 where he was involved with the development of the 1951 Kaiser. He went on to work at Studebaker Packard Corporation beginning in August, 1955, where he became chief stylist. Along with other designers at Studebaker, McRae helped design several models, including the 1958 Packard Hawk and the 1959 Studebaker Lark, a small car which sold in sufficient numbers to keep Studebaker afloat for several more years. McRae left Studebaker in 1960 and worked for a year at Curtiss-Wright Corporation. He then operated his own design studio in Muskegon, Michigan, working on various freelance design projects.

In 1964 McRae was hired by Ford Motor Company as a designer. He was transferred later that year to Ford of England, where we worked on the design of the Mark II Cortina, the Escort and the original Capri. In 1967 McRae was transferred to Ford of Germany where he led the design team which developed the Taunus 23M. After spending a year back at Ford's design center in Dearborn, Michigan, McRae was transferred to Ford of Australia in September 1969 where he became chief of design.

McRae retired from Ford Motor Company in 1975 and moved to Australia where he operated a cattle farm in Apollo Bay, Victoria for several years before returning to live in Ann Arbor, Michigan until his death in 1984.
