= Duncan MacGregor (academic) =

Scottish academic & administrator (1843–1906)

Duncan MacGregor M.A., M.B., (14 December 1843 – 16 December 1906) was a New Zealand university professor, public servant and health administrator.

He was born in Aberfeldy, (or Fortingall) Perthshire, Scotland the son of James MacGregor and Isabella his wife. He married at York Place, Edinburgh, in December 1870, to Miss Mary Johnston.

In August 1870 MacGregor was appointed Professor of Mental Science in the University of Otago, N.Z., a post which he resigned in 1886. From 1876 to 1882 Dr. MacGregor was medical officer of the Dunedin Lunatic Asylum, and in April 1886 was appointed Inspector-General of Asylums and Hospitals in New Zealand.
