= Falls of Cruachan derailment =

Derailment of a ScotRail passenger train on 6 June 2010, on the West Highland Line

Coordinates: 56.3956°N 5.1191°W

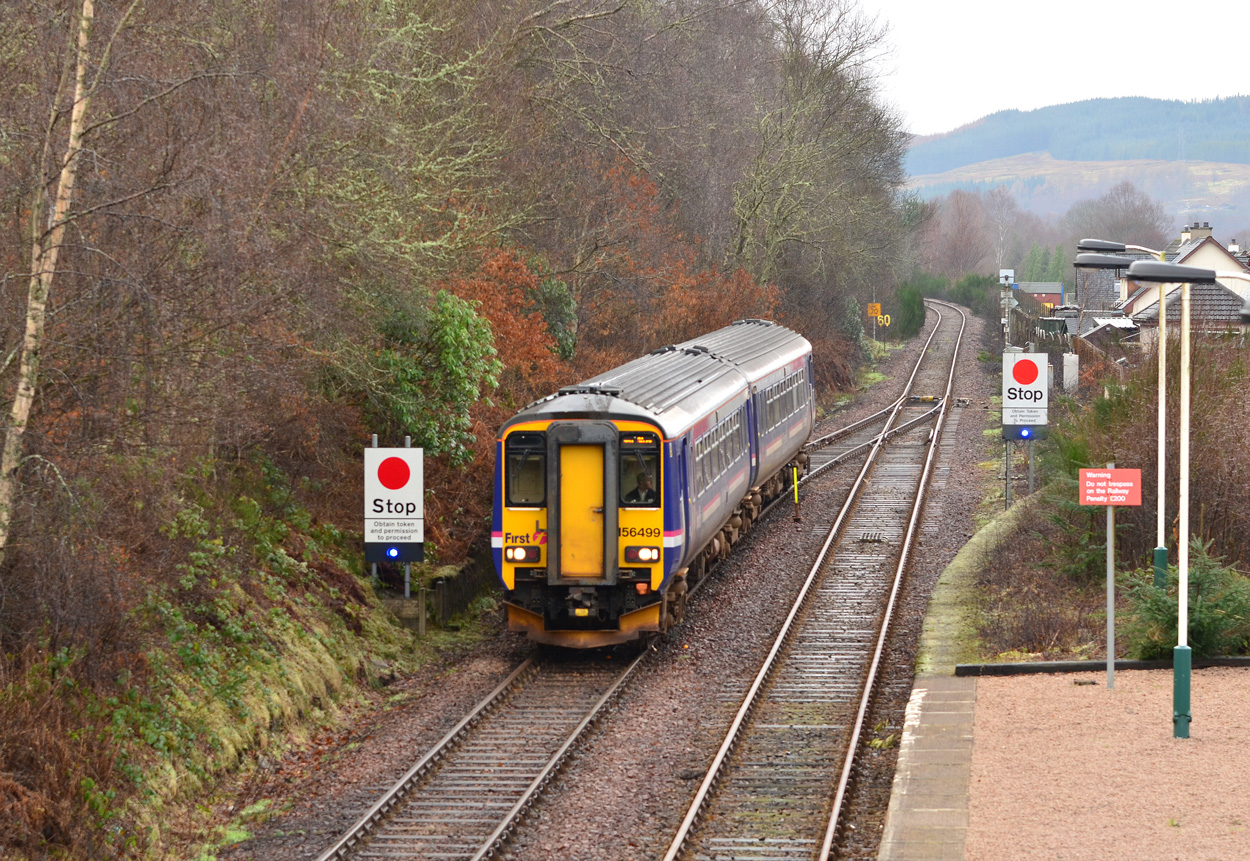
- 156499 (the unit involved) at Spean Bridge in 2012

Details
- Date: 6 June 2010; 20:53 BST (UTC+1)
- Location: Near Falls of Cruachan
- Country: United Kingdom
- Line: West Highland Line
- Operator: First ScotRail
- Incident type: Derailment
- Cause: Collision with debris following a landslide

Statistics
- Trains: 1
- Passengers: 60 + 3 crew
- Deaths: 0
- Injured: 8

The Falls of Cruachan derailment occurred on 6 June 2010 on the West Highland Line in Scotland, when a passenger train travelling between Glasgow and Oban hit boulders on the line and derailed near Falls of Cruachan railway station, after a landslide. There was a small fire (which was soon put out with fire extinguishers) and one carriage was left in a precarious position on the 50-foot-high (15-metre) embankment. Sixty passengers were evacuated, some with minor injuries; eight of those were hospitalised as a precaution. However, no people were killed. In addition to blocking the line, the incident also caused the closure of the A85 road below the rail line. Both the road and the rail line were closed for a week.

== Location ==
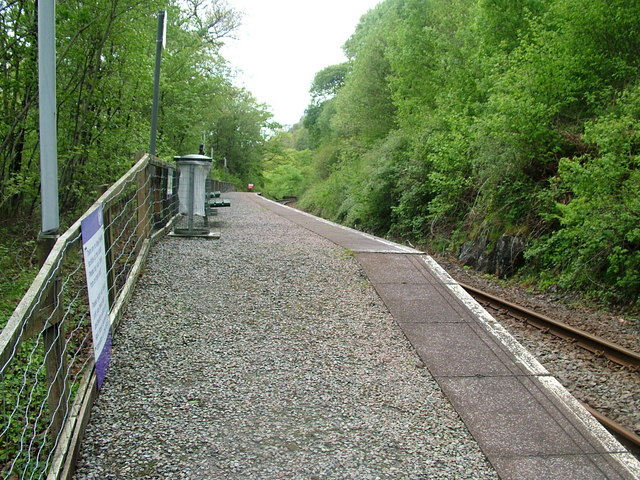
Falls of Cruachan station, near the accident site

The derailment occurred near Falls of Cruachan station, on the branch of the West Highland Line which departs from the main route at Crianlarich station, running west to a terminus at Oban station on the coast.

== Accident ==
The accident occurred on the 18:20 passenger train from Glasgow Queen Street station to Oban which hit boulders on the line and derailed shortly before 21:00 BST (UTC+1). The unit involved was Class 156 diesel multiple unit 156 499. It was initially thought that two carriages had been left hanging over the 50-foot (15 m) embankment, although only one carriage was left in this position. The leading bogie of the second carriage was also derailed. There was a flash fire on the train, of insufficient duration to activate the on-board fire extinguishing system. Lubricating oil from a damaged engine crankcase had spilled on the sleepers, and ignited. The fire was quickly put out by the train conductor and a passenger with two hand fire extinguishers.

== Rescue efforts ==
The train was carrying 60 passengers and three crew. Emergency services were alerted by a passenger on the train who dialed 999 at 20:53 BST.

Firefighters from the Strathclyde Fire and Rescue Service launched a major incident response. Two appliances from Oban, plus one each from Arrochar, Dalmally and Inveraray were despatched to the scene. A Major Incident Unit (MIU) from Clydebank and a Heavy Rescue Vehicle (HRV) from Easterhouse also attended the scene of the accident. Two air ambulances and a Royal Navy Sea King helicopter also attended the scene due to the remote location. The Strathclyde Police helicopter attended and searched the scene utilising FLIR.

Strathclyde Police attended with resources from Oban, Glasgow, Lochgilphead and Appin, and reported that all the passengers and crew had been evacuated from the train to the nearby Cruachan Power Station, helped to safety by the train crew.

British Transport Police attended from Glasgow. The Ambulance Service treated most of the injured passengers at the scene, at a triage facility set up at the power station. Nobody was found to be seriously hurt, although eight people were taken to hospitals in Oban, Lochgilphead and Glasgow as a precaution, with the most serious cases described as minor spinal injuries.

The Scottish Environment Protection Agency despatched two officers to the accident site to give advice on anti-pollution measures. Oil retention equipment was employed on Loch Awe and streams around the accident site to deal with any spilt diesel fuel from the carriages, which can carry 1,600 litres (350 imp gal) each. The MIU and HRV were stood down at 00:30 on 7 June, with other firefighters remaining on standby due to diesel leaking from a ruptured fuel tank on one of the carriages. All fire crews except for one rescue pump were stood down at 04:08, and control of the site was handed over to Network Rail engineers.

== Travel effects ==
As a result of the derailment, the A85 was closed between the junctions with the A819 and the A828, with a limited replacement bus service implemented for rail travellers. ScotRail warned passengers that no guarantee could be given in regard to connections with ferry services at Oban. On 8 June 2010, it reported that removing the train would take "days" leaving the A85 closed, and no firm date was set for the reopening of the line. The nightly closures for roadworks of the A83 road were suspended to ease the effects of the A85 diversion. The A85 reopened at 20:30 on 13 June, the West Highland Line reopening at 06:00 on 14 June 2010.

== Recovery of the train ==
On 8 June, Network Rail stated that they planned to have a crane on site to remove the two carriages by 11 June, after which track repairs would take place before the line could be opened to traffic. It was forecast that the line would be reopened in the week commencing 14 June. One of the problems with the recovery was that the A85 may have needed to be strengthened in order to bring in a crane to recover the carriages. The RMT Union reissued a demand that ScotRail scrap plans for the introduction of driver-only operated trains on the Airdrie–Bathgate rail link when it opened.

On 9 June, it was reported that a 1,000-tonne crane would be brought in by road from Carlisle to remove the derailed carriages on 10 June. The A85 at Falls of Cruachan was in effect on a bridge along the shore of Loch Awe and the engineers were looking at a number of methods to alleviate the problems with using such a large vehicle on the road. The carriage left overhanging the embankment was to be recovered by road, whilst the other was to be recovered by rail. A road crane had to be used as there was insufficient room available to use a rail-mounted crane. An option to use a helicopter to remove the carriages was ruled out due to the weight of the carriages at 35 tonnes each. If the crane was unable to recover the carriages, it was planned to winch them back onto the track and recover them by rail. The operation to recover the carriages was estimated to cost £100,000. On 11 June the crane removed the carriage that had fallen down the embankment.

== Rockfall risk ==
The stretch of line where the accident occurred is prone to rockfalls from the slopes of Ben Cruachan. The majority of incidents occur in summer and autumn, usually originated by sheep scrabbling on the slopes setting small stones rolling which then disturb larger ones. At least two derailments due to rockfalls had occurred previously in the area prior to the 2010 incident.

Along with other methods of rockfall risk reduction in the area, in the particular stretch of line from Loch Awe to Falls of Cruachan to Taynuilt, Network Rail also maintains the Pass of Brander stone signals. This is a purely mechanical warning system, independent of the radio signalling system used on the line. It sets one pair of a series of seventeen semaphore signals to 'danger' should rocks from the slopes of Ben Cruachan break a screen of ten thin wires horizontally strung 9 to 10 inches (23 to 25 cm) apart. The signals are spaced about 1/4 mile (400 m) apart over a 4-mile-1-chain (6.5 km) length of line.

Network Rail confirmed on 8 June however that the Pass of Brander signals would not have prevented the 2010 derailment, as the rocks fell from a position about 20 feet (6 m) below the wire screen, falling for about 50 feet (15 m) before landing on the track, a distance which was not considered to represent a sufficient landslide risk to be covered by the wires. When the system was originally installed, any unsafe boulders below the screen were wired back to the screen.

The Pass of Brander system covers the stretch of line from the 51-mile-72-chain (83.5 km) point to the 55-mile-73-chain (90.0 km) point, as measured from Callander. It was first installed in 1882 by the Callander and Oban Railway, following a derailment caused by falling rocks when a moving boulder actually struck a train, on 17 August 1881, a year after the line opened. It was then extended in stages up to 1913. A second derailment occurred on 8 August 1946, leaving the train perched on the edge of a 100-foot (30 m) drop. It happened to the 06:05 Oban to Glasgow train; the first the driver saw was the boulder falling onto the track, and was unable to stop the train in time. A third derailment occurred on 5 April 1997 at almost exactly the same site as the 2010 derailment. The guard on the train in 1997 was Angus McColl, who was also the guard in 2010. In the 1997 accident, the train remained upright and there were no reported injuries amongst the 40 passengers on board. On 11 October 2005, the locomotive of a freight train struck a boulder on the line between Tulloch and Corrour, on the West Highland Line. The locomotive was not derailed but suffered damage sufficient to put it out of action. The stretch of line where the accident occurred was not protected by trip wires activating signals.

On 11 June, Bob Crow, General Secretary of the RMT union, wrote to Network Rail criticising them for not implementing safety recommendations after a total of five previous derailments at Falls of Cruachan. Following the 1997 derailment, it was recommended that the embankment be stabilised above the line. Crow claimed that this work had not been carried out. Network Rail responded to Crow's allegation by stating that the cause of the accident was still under investigation by RAIB, and that it was their job to determine the cause, not the RMT's. Following the accident, vegetation clearance was undertaken and a number of rocks removed from the slopes above the railway as it was deemed that there was a risk of them falling onto the railway below.

== Investigation ==
According to the British Transport Police the immediate cause of the derailment was thought to be that the train struck boulders which were obstructing the line. Additionally, the driver had also reported that his train had collided with two boulders that were on the line.

An investigation was opened into the accident by the Rail Accident Investigation Branch with ScotRail assisting. Network Rail also assisted in the investigation.

The report of the investigation into the accident was published in July 2011. The investigation found that the boulder had been dislodged due to a combination of being lifted by tree roots and soil erosion. The inadequacy of the system of inspection of the area was cited as a possible causal factor. Five recommendations were made with respect to the management of vegetation and identification of the risk of rockfalls, with a sixth recommendation in respect of the security of lighting diffusers in the event of accidents.

== See also ==
- 1995 Ais Gill rail accident
- 2010 Merano train derailment
