= Clan MacIntyre =

Highland Scottish clan

- Clann an t-Saoir
- Crest: A dexter hand holding a dagger in pale Proper
- Motto: Per ardua (Through hardship or difficulty)
- War cry: Cruachan!

Profile
- District: Argyll
- Plant badge: White Heather
- Pipe music: We Will Take The Good Old Way

Chief
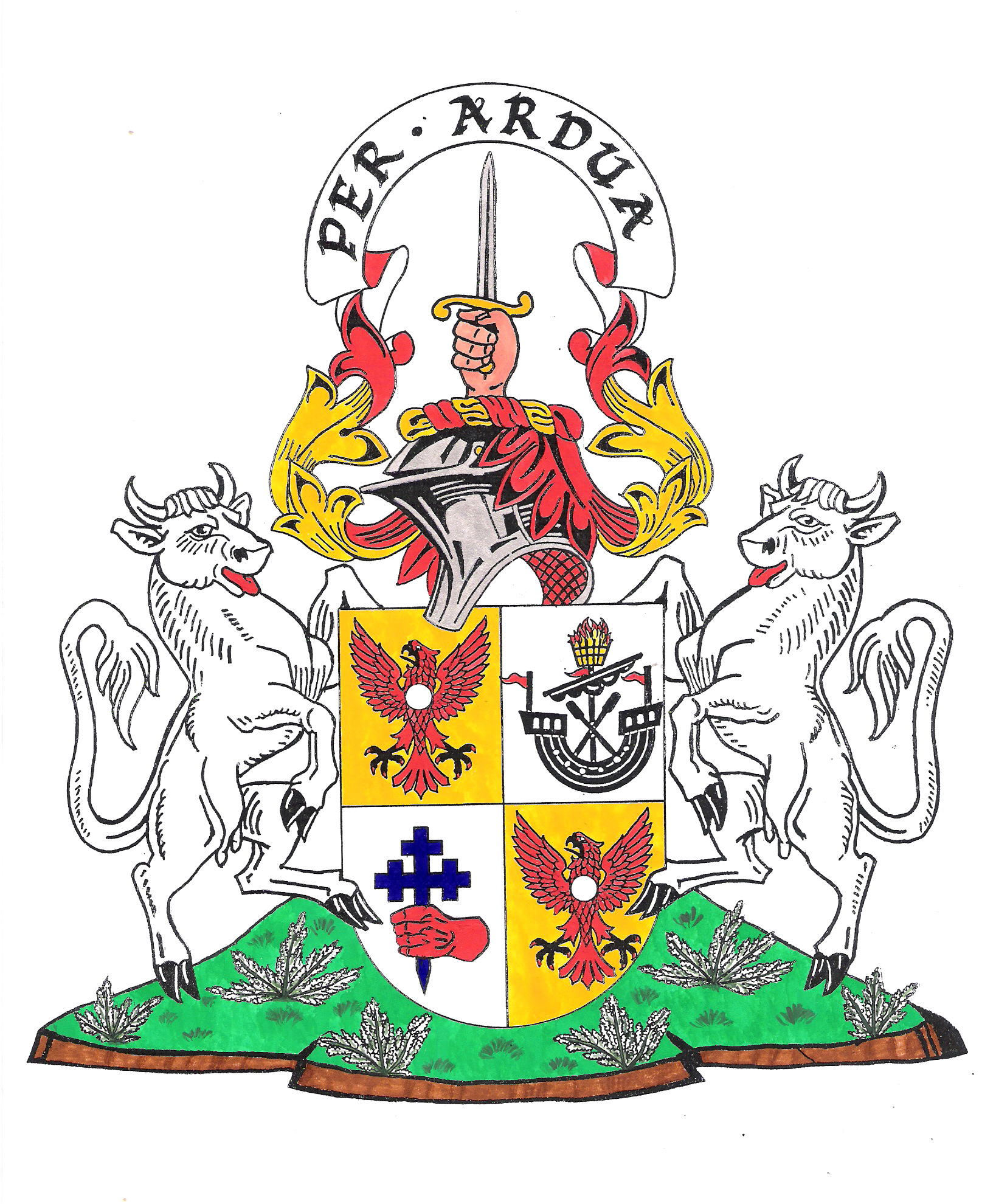
- Donald Russell MacIntyre of Glenoe
- Chief of the Name and Arms of MacIntyre
- Historic seat: Glen Noe
Allied clans
Clan Chattan, Clan MacFarlane

Clan MacIntyre (McIntyre) (Scottish Gaelic: Clann an t-Saoir [ˈkʰl̪ˠãũn̪ˠ ən̪ˠ ˈt̪ʰɯːɾʲ]) is a Scottish clan. The name MacIntyre (from Scottish Gaelic Mac an t-Saoir), means "son of the carpenter." It is most commonly said to descend from Maurice Mac Neil, a nephew of Somerled, the great 12th-century leader of the Scottish Gaels. Through an ingenious strategy, Maurice secured the marriage of Somerled to the daughter of the King of Mann and the Isles, thus greatly increasing Somerled's territories. At an unknown date the clan journeyed from the Hebrides to the Scottish mainland where the chiefs established their home at Glen Noe, in Ardchattan Parish, on the east side of Loch Etive.

The earliest recorded clan chiefs do not emerge until the 17th century. According to tradition, they had held the land at Glen Noe for centuries, although subject to a feudal tenure converted to money rent in later years. In 1806, however, the chief was forced to relinquish the tenancy of Glen Noe due to inability to meet the payments. He and his family subsequently emigrated to the United States.

MacIntyres participated in military campaigns during the Wars of the Three Kingdoms and the Jacobite rising of 1745–46 but they did not operate as an independent body. Clan members served as hereditary foresters to the Lords of Lorne and as hereditary pipers to the chiefs of Clan Menzies, Clan Chattan and the MacDonalds of Clanranald. Duncan Ban MacIntyre is regarded as one of the finest Gaelic poets.

== Origins ==
The name MacIntyre (McIntyre) (Scottish Gaelic: Mac an t-Saoir), means "son of a carpenter", or "son of a craftsman". Iain Moncreiffe notes that some consider the name to be a trade name, equivalent to the names Wright or MacNair ("son of the heir") and attribute the existence of the surname in various parts of Scotland to the fact that the name signifies descent from various individuals who were wood workers. In 1990, Scotland's heraldic authority, the Lord Lyon King of Arms, recognised MacIntyre of Glenoe as Chief of the Name and Arms of the name MacIntyre. Although several works mention a "Black Book of Glen Noe", now lost, said to have contained the history of Clan MacIntyre, no documented record of the clan's origins has ever been discovered. There are, however, several accounts that purport to identify its founder and explain its name. The most frequently repeated story ties the MacIntyres to Somerled, who lived in the 12th century and who has been described as "one of the greatest warrior kings born to the Gaels of Alba (Scotland)." An ambitious figure almost from the outset, Somerled sought the hand of Ragnhilda, daughter of King Olav the Red, Norse King of Man and the Isles. The story of how, after being initially rebuffed by that island magnate, Somerled would ultimately succeed through the stealth of one of his kinsmen, is recorded in the history of MacDonald of Sleat.

According to this account, Somerled agreed to join Olav in an expedition to raid Skye. The night before sailing, however, a ship wright or carpenter known as Maurice Mac Neil (the second name sometimes given as MacNiall or MacArill), by some accounts Somerled's nephew, secretly bored holes in the hull of Olav's ship using tallow and butter to temporarily seal them. On entering the open seas the tallow was washed away by the action of the waves and the king's ship began rapidly taking on water. Olav's urgent appeal for help was spurned by Somerled, until he consented to the previously sought marriage. Maurice then boarded the King's ship and filled the holes with wooden plugs he had previously prepared for the purpose. From that time the descendants of Maurice were called "MacIntyres," "carpenters (or shipwrights) sons"."^{,} (Note: Although this account (with certain variations) appears routinely in clan histories, Dr. George F. Black, authority on Scottish surnames, has dismissed it as "too silly for belief." Less critically, MacDonald of Castleton has commented: "A romantic story, perhaps, but like some others there may be a grain of truth in it.")

The sought-after marriage would take place in 1140. One line of Somerled's MacDonald descendants would become known as Kings and Lords of the Isles and over several centuries would contend with the Scottish monarchy for control of a large portion of northwestern Scotland.

Another account, involving seafaring, holds that the name arose from the misfortune of a mariner afloat. In this version the clan's founder, sometimes identified as son of one of the Lords of the Isles, cuts off his thumb in order to plug a leak in his sinking vessel.

The original home of Clan MacIntyre is likewise the subject of conjecture. There is general agreement that the clan arose in the Hebrides, the islands west of the Scottish mainland. Some accounts, however, identify Skye as the ancestral home, while another tradition holds Islay to have been the locale. The story of how the clan made its way to the mainland and settled along the shore of Loch Etive in the vicinity of Ben Cruachan is again shrouded in myth and magic. It is said that seeking fresh pastures for their cattle they were initially obstructed by a mountain spirit. After testing their perseverance and courage the spirit instructed them to make their new home where the white cow in their herd should first lie down to rest. This site became known as Glen Noe. (Note: The location is found rendered "Glennoe" and, more rarely, "Gleno." It is occasionally erroneously confused with Glencoe, site of an infamous massacre of MacDonalds.)

== History ==
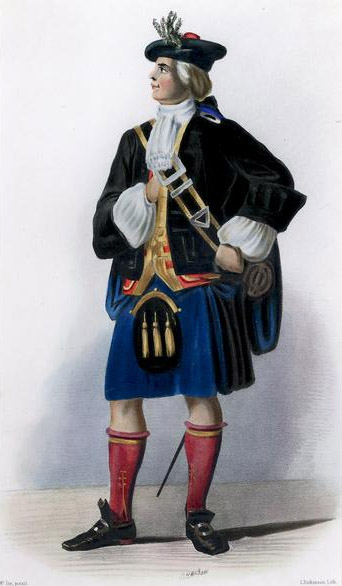
A romantic depiction of a MacIntyre clansman illustrated by R. R. McIan, from James Logan's The Clans of the Scottish Highlands, 1845. (Note: Unlike most of the other clansmen illustrated by R.R. McIan in the nineteenth century work The Clans of the Scottish Highlands, the figure representing Clan MacIntyre is not shown wearing a tartan kilt. According to James Logan, who supplied the text accompanying the clan figures, MacIntyre is shown wearing the dress often worn during the period following the uprising of 1745 during which the Act of Proscription, outlawing the wearing of kilts and tartans, was in effect. Measures taken by the highlanders to evade these restrictions included wearing kilts of a solid color and sewing the kilt between the legs "to enable them to maintain the plea that such form was not the Highland dress." Logan relates that: "When Doctor [Samuel] Johnson visited the isle of Skye, he was conveyed to Rasa in the boat of Malcolm MacLeod, a gentleman who had been Captain in the army of Prince Charles, and he is described as wearing a kilt of the colour here shown, the dye of which is procured from a native vegetable substance." This being the case, why McIan depicted his Clan MacLeod figure in the appropriate tartan for that clan and chose the MacIntyre figure to illustrate this temporary expedient is unexplained.)

Many accounts relate that at some point in the 13th century the MacIntyres became foresters to the Lords of Lorne, a hereditary post in which they continued as the territory subsequently passed from the MacDougalls to the control of the Stewarts and finally to the Campbells.

After settling at Glen Noe, the chiefs are said to have held the land for centuries. While presumably owning the property outright originally, it is generally agreed that at some, uncertain date, they acquired a feudal obligation to the Campbells of Breadalbane. Initially, this entailed only a symbolic payment. Tradition identifies this as a snowball supplied at midsummer and a white calf surrendered but then killed and shared by landlord and tenant as a token of mutual esteem.

The earliest recorded clan chiefs do not emerge until the 17th century. The earliest chief is Duncan, who married Mary, daughter of Patrick Campbell of Barcaldine. He died in 1695 and is buried at Ardchattan Priory.

From this era comes a traditional account that the home of the MacIntyre chief was saved by the clan's ties to the MacDonalds. At the time of the English Civil War in Scotland the forces of James Graham, 1st Marquess of Montrose, had sacked Inveraray and marched north to the area of Glen Noe. As a tenant of the Campbells, the chief was deemed an opponent of the Royalist faction, which Montrose served. The chief, expecting no mercy, fled. As part of their campaign, the Royalist troops were under orders to destroy all houses in the neighbourhood and began to set fire to the chief's house. The commander of Montrose's men, Sir Alexander MacDonald, (Note: This officer is sometimes identified by the Gaelic name "Alexander Mac Cholla Ciotag" or "Alastair MacColkeitach.")extinguished the blaze before it became widespread and sent word to the chief that his property had been spared in recognition of the services the clan's founder had performed in contriving the marriage of Somerled, ancestor of the MacDonalds to Ragnhilda half a millennium earlier.^{,} (Note: Gordon's account holds that the chief, in anticipation of arson by the Royalist troops, set fire to his own house.)

Many MacIntyres subsequently joined MacDonald's army including the chief's piper. The chief, however, was with Campbell of Argyll at the battle of Inverlochy in February 1645 when the Campbells were surprised by Montrose's forces and routed.

It is said that the MacIntyre chief at the time of the Jacobite rising of 1745, James (born c. 1727), would have joined the clans rallying to Prince Charles Edward Stuart but was dissuaded from doing so by his wife, who was a Campbell, and his neighbors. His loyalties to the Campbells were further deepened by the fact that his legal studies had been sponsored by the Campbell Earl of Breadalbane. Nonetheless, many MacIntyres were in the clan regiment of Stewart of Appin in the campaign of 1745–46, but they did not serve as an independent body.

At some unknown date the symbolic snowball and calf tokens owed to the Campbells were commuted to payment of money rent which increased over the years. In 1806, the chief was forced to relinquish the tenancy of Glen Noe due to inability to meet the payments. The chief and his family emigrated to the United States, where the family continues to reside. Although the identities of the chiefs were always known to interested clan members, the chiefship of the clan was not officially recognized by Scottish authorities until 1991, when the coat of arms of James Wallace MacIntyre of Glenoe was confirmed by the Lord Lyon, King of Arms. The current chief of the clan is Donald Russell MacIntyre of Glenoe. The MacIntyre chiefs hold membership in the Standing Council of Scottish Chiefs.

== Tartan ==
Tartan image	Notes
	A swatch of fabric in a plaid or "tartan" design. On a green background appear four squares composed of a broad blue stripe overlaid with a thin red stripe. Over each square is superimposed two thin white stripes forming a cross. MacIntyre hunting tartan, as published in 1842, in the Vestiarium Scoticum. There is another clan tartan which features a red background with blue and green stripes, that may be derived from a Glenorchy district tartan.

== Pipers, poets and bards ==
The MacIntyres of Rannoch, were hereditary pipers to the chiefs of Clan Menzies and composed some of that clan's music. They supplied hereditary pipers to the MacDonalds of Clanranald, and a noted pibroch commemorating the battle of Sheriffmuir is attributed to one of these MacIntyres.

In the 18th century two members of the clan earned considerable regard for their Gaelic poetry. James, the poet-chief, (1727–1799) is best remembered for a biting satire he composed in Gaelic in response to Samuel Johnson, the English encyclopedist, who had made derogatory comments about the Scots in his famous trip to the Hebrides.

The poet-chief would find himself eclipsed by one of his own kinsmen, however. Born on 20 March 1724, in Druimliaghart, Glenorchy, Argyllshire, Duncan Ban MacIntyre would become known to his countrymen as "Fair Duncan of the Songs." One historian has described him as "one of the twin peaks of the century's Gaelic verse" and some have even called him the "Burns of the Highlands." His work was described as possessing "an unrivaled originality of conception, with the most mellifluous flow of language." Yet his biographers agree that he was wholly illiterate.

His most critically acclaimed work is "The Praise of Ben Dorain," but he is well known for his poetic commentaries on contemporary events. In the Jacobite rising of 1745 which attempted to return the House of Stuart to the throne of Scotland and England, Duncan fought on the Hanoverian side and composed a humorous song after losing his borrowed sword at the battle of Falkirk in January 1746. Following that uprising, however, he composed a best selling poem attacking the portion of the Act of Proscription outlawing the wearing of highland dress and was briefly imprisoned.^{,} (Note: Although this statement appears regularly, a twentieth century translator of MacIntyre's works has expressed skepticism: "[N]o one has stated when or where the poet was tried and sentenced. Without further evidence Macintyre cannot be included among the Jacobite martyrs.") When the ban against the wearing of the kilt was repealed, he celebrated with another poem, entitled Orain na Briogas or "Song of the Breeches."

He was named bard to the Highland Society of London and was so esteemed that in his later years schoolchildren were allowed out of class to see him when he traveled to their community. He died on 6 October 1812. In 1859, a monument to the memory of Duncan Ban MacIntyre (described in contemporary press accounts as "in the druid style of architecture") was erected near Dalmally at the head of Loch Awe.

== Other MacIntyre families and groups ==
Camus-na-h-erie: (Note: Older transliterations give the location as "Camus-na-h-Eireath" and "Camus-na-h-Eireadh.") In 1955 Alastair MacIntyre of Camus-na-h-erie recorded arms in the Lyon Court as a cadet of the chiefly house of MacIntyre, although with a shield significantly different from that subsequently granted to the clan chief in 1991.

This branch of the family claims descent from Patrick, a son of a chief of Glenoe. The family established themselves on the shores of the Inverness-shire Loch Leven at Camus-na-h-erie. John Macintyre of Camus-na-h-erie, 10th of his line, fought on the Jacobite side in the 1745 and was wounded at the battle of Falkirk. It is reported that nine members of MacIntyre of Camus-na-h-erie were taken prisoners in the 1745 rising. In the early 19th century, the family was represented by the Rev. John MacIntyre, D.D. of Kilmonivaig.

Badenoch: The MacIntyres of Badenoch are said to have been descended from a bard taken under the protection of the Clan Mackintosh chief at the end of the 15th century, settling mainly in the parishes of Kingussie and Laggan, but also further down the River Spey in the vicinity of Alvie. The MacIntyres of Badenoch, also known as “Clan Inteir”, is the sixteenth and final admission into the Clan Chattan Confederation, an alliance of clans headed by the Mackintosh chief. During the 17th century, several of the Clan Chattan Macintyres were known cattle raiders associated with Patrick Roy MacGregor.

During the Jacobite Uprisings of 1715 and 1745, a number of Badenoch Macintyres, mainly from the parish of Laggan, fought alongside their Chattan brethren and appear on the transportation lists for the 1715 Jacobite uprising whilst a Malcolm Macintyre, along with a Donald Macintyre appears on the 1746 surrender lists for MacPherson of Cluny´s Regiment. A James Macintyre, (Seumas na Braiteach, or James of the Flag), saved the Regimental Green Banner from destruction.

The Badenoch Land clearances of 1797, affected the township of Biallid Beag, the location of an ancient Macpherson/Macintyre cemetery, St. Patricks, affecting many Badenoch Macintyres. Cladich: The little hamlet of Cladich above Loch Awe near the road to Inveraray was a center of weaving and almost all of the inhabitants were MacIntyres. A specialty of the industry were men's hose and garters, which were prized at that time for wearing with the highland costume.

Notable Badenoch Macintyres include:

- Major General Donald MacIntyre
- Malcolm Macintyre, (1755-1830), clan poet

== Irish MacIntyres ==
The relationship of MacIntyres in Scotland to those in Ireland is not entirely clear. Given the proximity of the two countries and the similarity of their languages, some Scottish MacIntyres undoubtedly settled in Ireland, mainly in Ulster.

Dr. Edward MacLysaght, authority on Irish genealogy, does not include MacIntyre as a separate entry in his two works on Irish families. Rather, he lists MacIntyre, along with Carpenter, Freeman, O’Seery, and Searson in his entry on the name "Macateer". He likewise specifies that in Ireland MacIntyres are found chiefly in Ulster, and in County Sligo. It would appear, in Dr. MacLysaght's view, that those MacIntyres who are of native Irish ancestry originally were Macateers who changed their names.^{,} (Note: Dr. MacLysaght dismisses as a "fallacy" the commonly held notion that names beginning in "Mc" are Irish, while those beginning with "Mac" are of Scottish origin. "There is," he states, "no difference. Mc is simply an abbreviation of Mac.")

It is believed that some Irish MacIntyres descend from native Irish stock whose ancestors were living in the same areas in which Scottish MacIntyres settled and who assumed the Scottish surname, rather than Macateer, as an anglicization of the Irish name Mac an tSoir.

== Septs ==
Septs are family names associated with a particular clan. In the case of MacIntyre, the surname Wright, when of Scottish origin, is considered an anglicized form of the name. Other family names associated with the clan include Glenoe, MacCoiseam, Tyrie (also Tyree), MacTear, MacTeer, McAntara and McEntire.

== Clan profile ==
- Chief: Donald Russell MacIntyre of Glenoe Chief of the Name and Arms of MacIntyre,
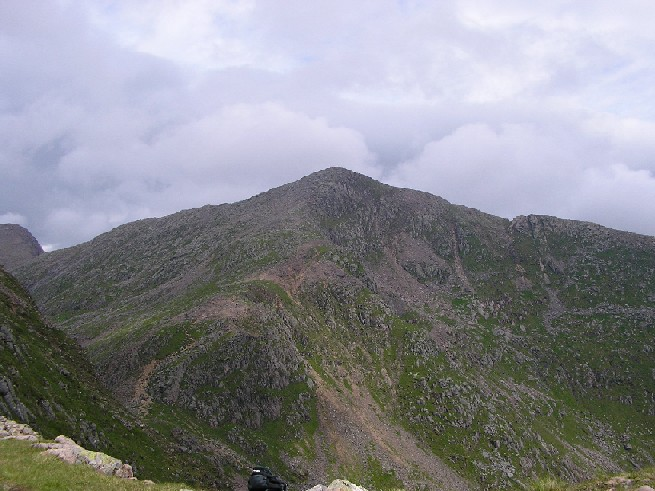
  "Cruachan" (A mountain, Ben Cruachan) is the traditional MacIntyre war cry
- Arms: A coat of arms consisting of a shield divided into quarters. In the upper left and lower right quarter, a red eagle, its wings outstretched. The upper right quarter shows a ship with furled sails, while in the lower left quarter a red hand grasps a blue cross. A cow, standing on two hooves, appears on either side of the shield. The shield is surmounted by a silver helmet above which there is a hand grasping a dagger.|Coat of arms of the chief of Clan MacIntyre. (Note: The technical heraldic description (or blazon) of the arms is: Quarterly, 1st & 4th, Or, an eagle displayed Gules, beaked and membered Sable, charged on the breast with a plate; 2nd, Argent, a lymphad, sails furled, oars in saltire Sable, flagged Gules, with a beacon on top of the mast Proper; 3rd, Argent, a sinister hand fessways Gules holding a cross crosslet fitchée Azure. Crest: A dexter hand holding a dagger in pale Proper. Motto: Per ardua. Supporters: (on a compartment embellished with white heather) two cows Argent, langued Gules, hooved Sable.)
- Motto: Per ardua (Through hardship or difficulty).
- War Cry: "Cruachan" (A mountain, Ben Cruachan, near Loch Awe).^{,} (Note: "Cruachan" is the war cry of Clan Campbell.)
- Pipe Music: "We Will Take The Good Old Way" (Scottish Gaelic: Gabhaidh Sinn An Rathad Mór). (Note: Links to the words and music to this march can be found at the Clan MacIntyre Association website.)
- Plant Badge: White Heather.^{,} (Note: Older works identify the plant badge as "Fraoch gorm, common heath, Erica Vulgaris.")
