= Taynuilt railway station =

Railway station in Argyll and Bute, Scotland

Taynuilt Scottish Gaelic: Taigh an Uillt
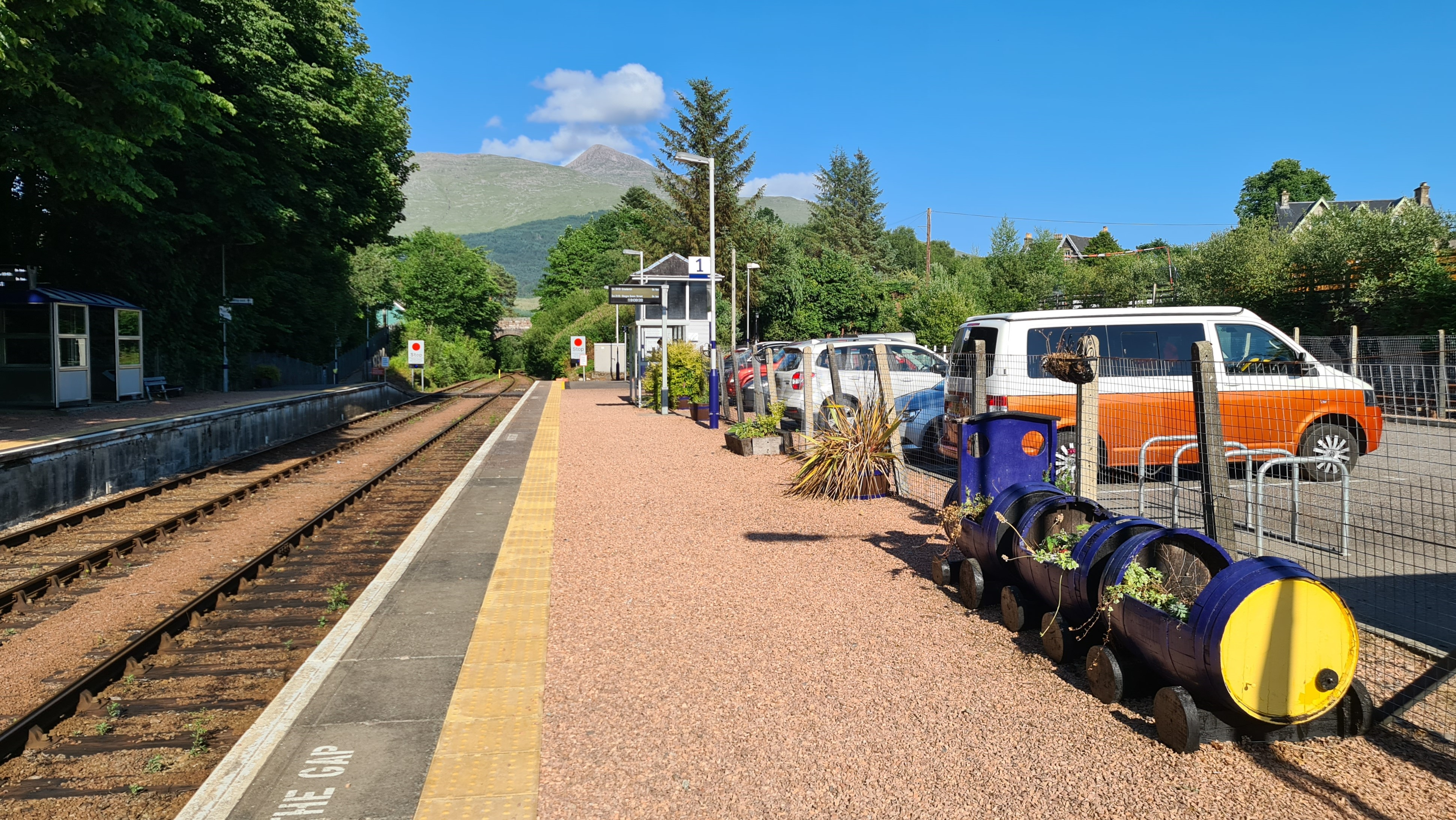

General information
- Location: Taynuilt, Argyll and Bute; Scotland
- Coordinates: 56.4309°N 5.2394°W
- Grid reference: NN003312
- Manager: ScotRail
- Platforms: 2

Other information
- Station code: TAY

History
- Original company: Callander and Oban Railway
- Pre-grouping: Callander and Oban Railway operated by Caledonian Railway

Key dates
- 1 July 1880: Opened

Passengers
- 2021/22: ▲35,456
- 2022/23: ▲42,026
- 2023/24: ▲45,776
- 2024/25: ▼38,888
- 2025/26: ▲41,144
Location
Notes
- Passenger statistics from the Office of Rail and Road

Taynuilt railway station is a railway station serving the village of Taynuilt in western Scotland. This station is on the Oban branch of the West Highland Line, originally part of the Callander and Oban Railway, between Falls of Cruachan and Connel Ferry, sited 58 miles 55 chains (94.4 km) from Callander via Glen Ogle. ScotRail manage the station and operate all services.

== History ==
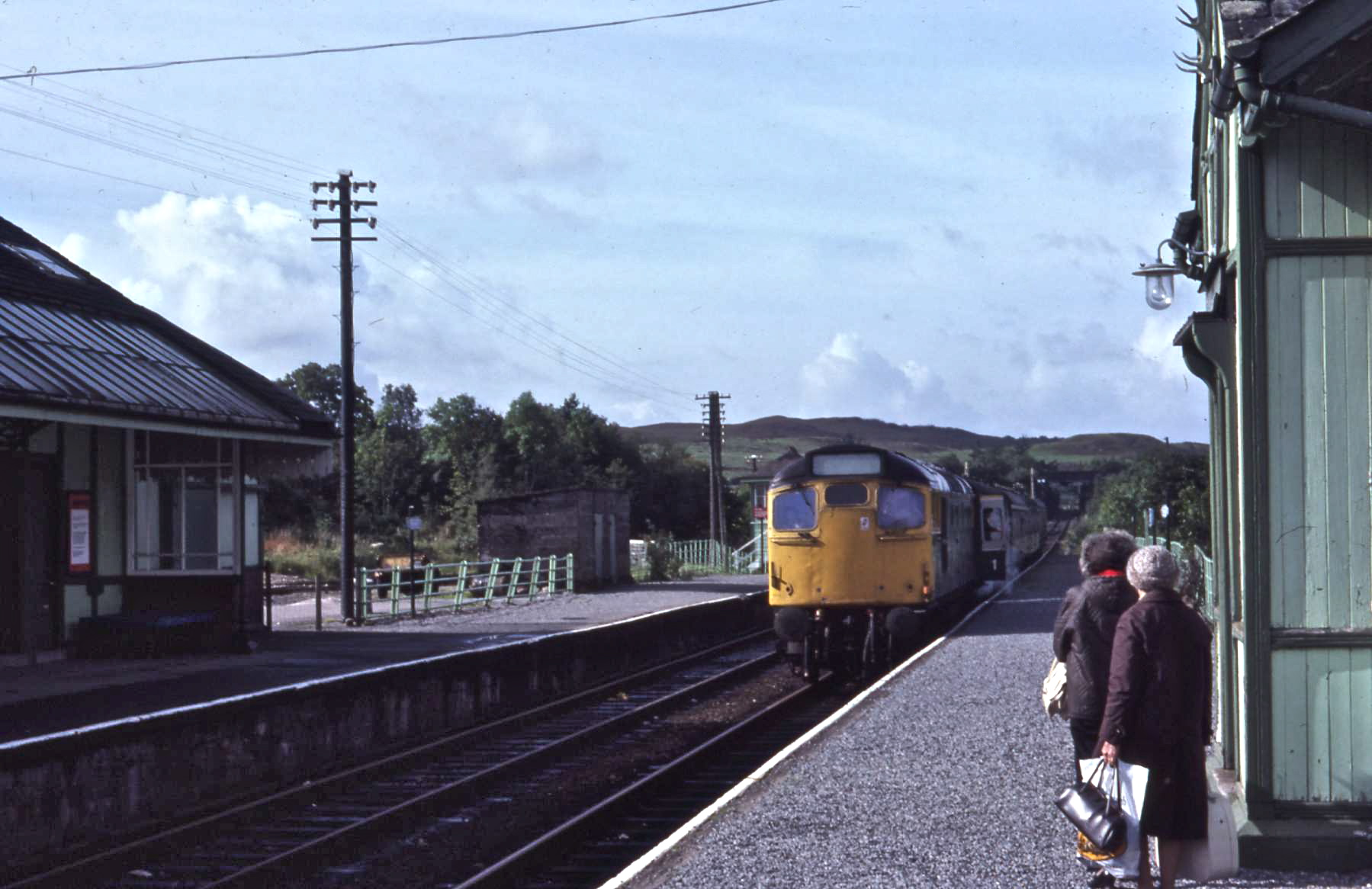
Class 27 in 1979 - the building on the left was destroyed by fire after 1994

Taynuilt station opened on 1 July 1880, when the Callander and Oban Railway was extended from Dalmally to Oban.

The station is laid out with two platforms, one on either side of a crossing loop. There are two sidings on the south side of the station.

== Facilities ==
Facilities at the station are basic, consisting of shelters on both platforms, a bench on platform 2, bike racks and ca car park adjacent to platform 1 and a help point on the wall of the old signal box. All of the station has step-free access. As there are no facilities to purchase tickets, passengers must buy one in advance, or from the guard on the train.

== Passenger volume ==
Passenger Volume at Taynuilt
	2004–05	2005–06	2006–07	2007–08	2008–09	2009–10	2010–11	2011–12	2012–13	2013–14	2014–15	2015–16	2016–17	2017–18	2018–19	2019–20	2020–21	2021–22	2022–23	2023–24	2024–25
Entries and exits	11,334	9,873	10,005	9,925	10,268	11,364	11,802	11,940	12,980	12,660	21,968	22,226	21,916	24,788	22,472	18,416	35,054	35,456	42,026	45,776	38,888

The statistics cover twelve month periods that start in April.

== Services ==
As of the May 2026 timetable, there are 6 departures in each direction on weekdays and Saturdays, with trains heading eastbound to Glasgow Queen Street and westbound to Oban. On weekdays only, an additional service in each direction between Dalmally and Oban calls here in the late afternoon. On Sundays, there are 4 departures each way.

Preceding station	National Rail	Following station
Falls of Cruachan or Loch Awe	ScotRail; West Highland Line	Connel Ferry
	Historical railways	
Falls of Cruachan; Line and station open	Callander and Oban Railway; Operated by Caledonian Railway	Ach-na-Cloich; Line open; station closed

== Bibliography ==
- Brailsford, Martyn, ed. (December 2017) [1987]. Railway Track Diagrams 1: Scotland & Isle of Man (6th ed.). Frome: Trackmaps. ISBN 978-0-9549866-9-8.
- Butt, R. V. J. (October 1995). The Directory of Railway Stations: details every public and private passenger station, halt, platform and stopping place, past and present (1st ed.). Sparkford: Patrick Stephens Ltd. ISBN 978-1-85260-508-7. OCLC 60251199. OL 11956311M.
- Fryer, Charles (1989). The Callander and Oban Railway. Oxford: Oakwood Press. ISBN 0-8536-1377-X. OCLC 21870958.
- Jowett, Alan (March 1989). Jowett's Railway Atlas of Great Britain and Ireland: From Pre-Grouping to the Present Day (1st ed.). Sparkford: Patrick Stephens Ltd. ISBN 978-1-85260-086-0. OCLC 22311137.
