= Pass of Brander stone signals =

Railway signal in Argyll and Bute, Scotland

Coordinates: 56.399°N 5.138°W

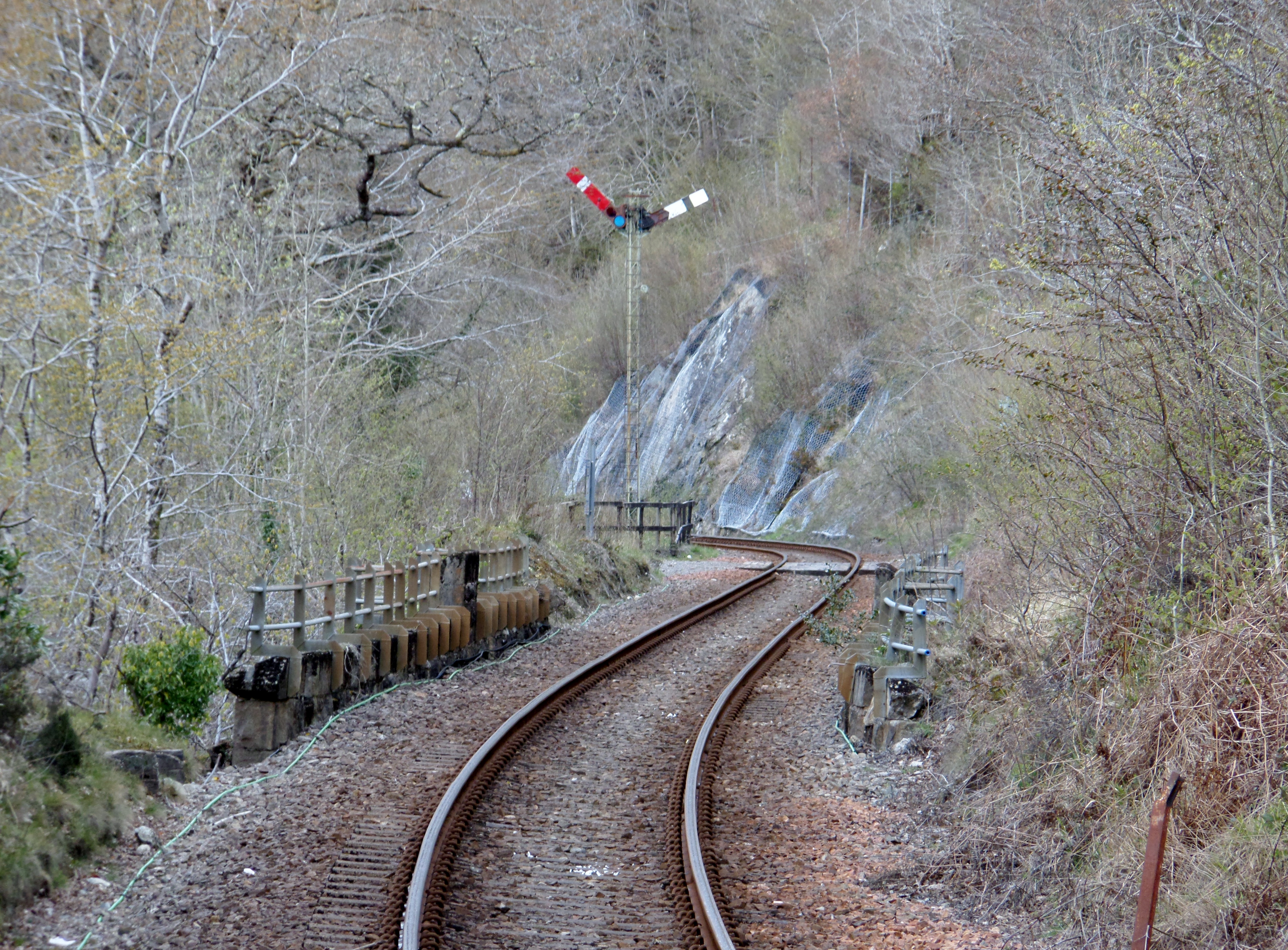
One of the signals in April 2016

The Pass of Brander stone signals, also known as Anderson's Piano, are a series of railway signals that are automatically triggered by rockfalls. They are located in the Pass of Brander, between Loch Awe and Taynuilt stations on the Oban branch of the West Highland Line in Scotland.

A screen of wires, linked to semaphore signals, is erected on the mountainside alongside the railway track. In the event of one or more wires being broken, signals in each direction are automatically placed at 'danger'. They are part of a warning system that advises train drivers to exercise caution in the event of a rock-fall, and cover a section of track that is just over 4 miles (6.4 km) in length.

== Function ==
The wires are linked to semaphore signals and maintain the signals in the "clear" position. In the event of one or more wires being broken, signals in each direction will automatically fall to the 'danger' position, thus providing advance warning to train crews about possible rocks on the track ahead and/or other damage caused by rockfalls.

Signals are erected at intervals of approximately a quarter mile (400 m) along the affected area and there are seventeen signals in all. They are numbered from 1 to 17, with signal 1 being at the east (Dalmally) end. All except number 9 stand on the south side of the line. All the signals apart from numbers 1 and 17 carry two semaphore arms, one for each direction.

== History ==
The railway through the Pass of Brander was opened in July 1880, as part of the Callander and Oban Railway (C&OR). Since the line's opening, rocks falling from the steep slopes of Ben Cruachan onto the track had threatened to cause a derailment, and in 1881 a falling boulder hit a train. In response, the secretary of the C&OR, John Anderson, devised a system that would detect falling rocks and provide a warning to drivers.

The initial system was used from January 1882 and comprised four signals covering 1,112 yards (1,017 m) of line. In April 1883, the system was extended at both ends, resulting in the coverage of 5,659 yards (5,175 m) of track. The final extension, at the west end, was made in September 1913, increasing the length to the current 7,054 yards (6,450 m).

The system has given early warning of many boulders on the track, but two derailments have occurred where boulders evaded the screen: on 8 August 1946, when the fall occurred just as the train approached, too late for signals to give a warning, and 6 June 2010, when the fall started below the wires.

=== Name ===
The name 'Anderson's Piano' derives from the inventor of the signals and the humming noise that the tensioned screen wires are said to make in the wind. In 2021, the system was awarded a Red Wheels Plaque by the National Transport Trust in recognition of it being a site of historical importance to transport heritage in the United Kingdom.

== Other systems ==
Although trip wires working with colour light signals are occasionally used alongside railways in the vicinity of airports, and are common in railroads running through the Rocky Mountains and similar areas around the world, the Pass of Brander system is much older and entirely mechanical in operation.

== See also ==
- Railway slide fence
- Falls of Cruachan derailment
