= Falls of Cruachan railway station =

Scottish railway station

Falls of Cruachan Scottish Gaelic: Eas Chruachain
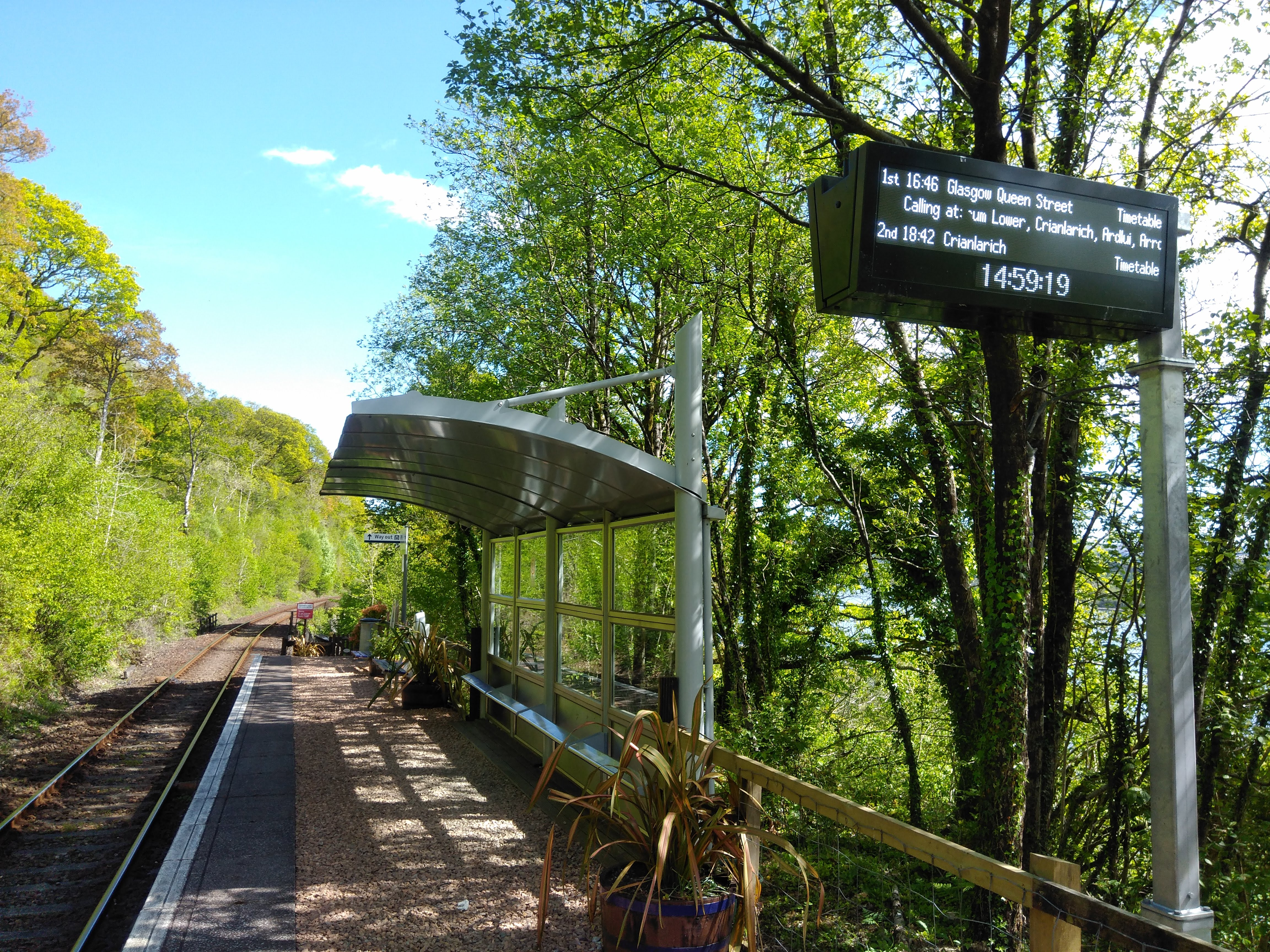
- The station in May 2019

General information
- Location: Ben Cruachan, Argyll and Bute; Scotland
- Coordinates: 56.3940°N 5.1128°W
- Grid reference: NN079267
- Manager: ScotRail
- Platforms: 1

Other information
- Station code: FOC

History
- Original company: Callander and Oban Railway
- Pre-grouping: Callander and Oban Railway operated by Caledonian Railway

Key dates
- 1 October 1893: Opened
- 1 November 1965: Closed
- 20 June 1988: Re-opened
- 25 October 2020: Closed (temporarily)
- 17 May 2021: Re-opened

Passengers
- 2021/22: ▲492
- 2022/23: ▲888
- 2023/24: ▲1,478
- 2024/25: ▲1,782
- 2025/26: ▲2,288
Location
Notes
- Passenger statistics from the Office of Rail and Road

Falls of Cruachan railway station is a railway station located at the foot of Ben Cruachan in Scotland. This station is on the Oban branch of the West Highland Line, originally part of the Callander and Oban Railway. It is sited between Taynuilt and Loch Awe, sited 52 miles 69 chains (85.1 km) from Callander via Glen Ogle. ScotRail manage the station and operate all services. The platform falls within the four mile stretch of railway that is protected by the Pass of Brander stone signals.

== History ==
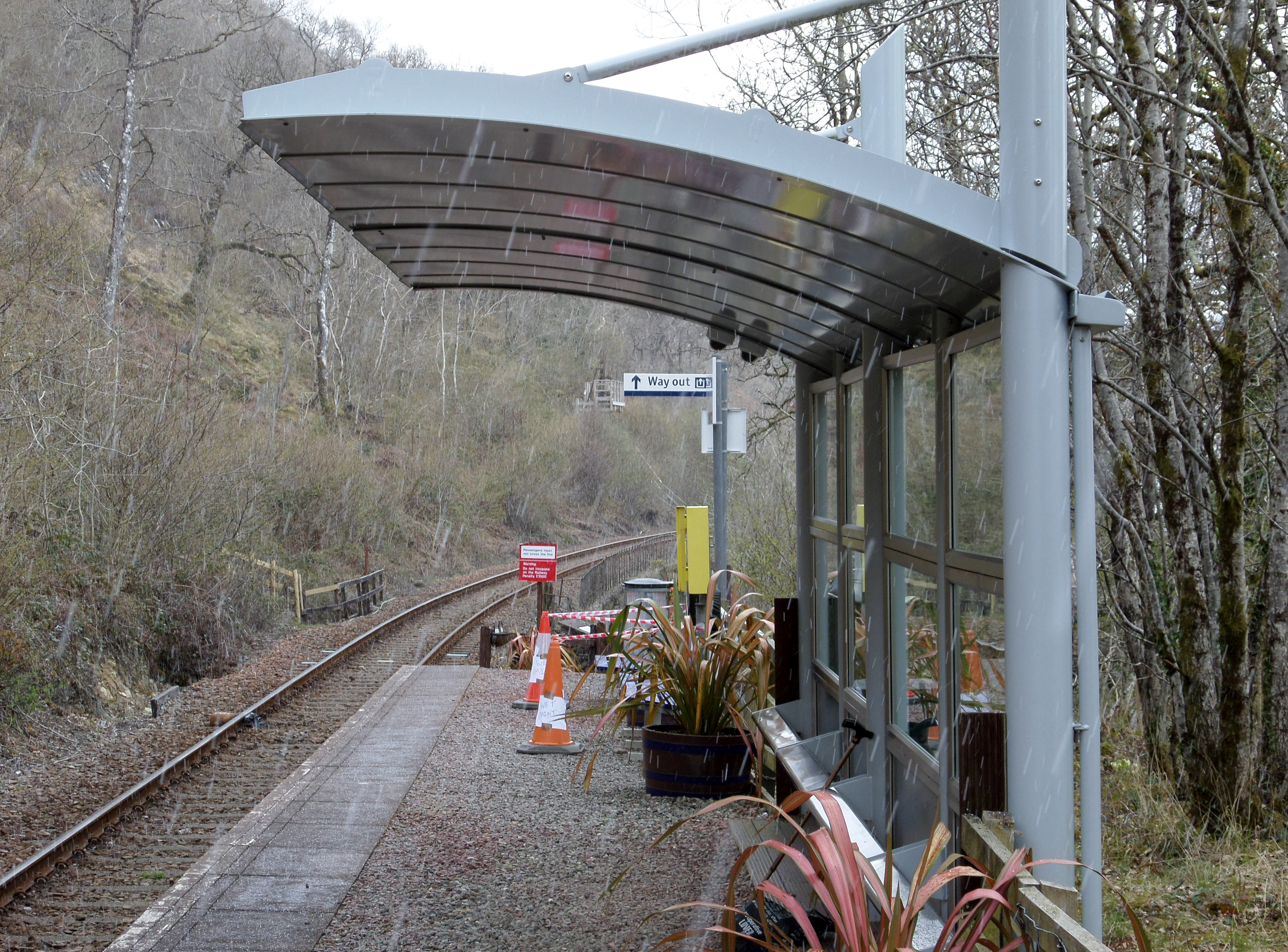
The shelter at the Falls of Cruachan station.

The station (on the lower slopes of Ben Cruachan, above Loch Awe) opened on 1 October 1893 with a single platform, but was later closed on 1 November 1965. The station was reopened on 20 June 1988.

=== Accidents and incidents ===
The area near the station has been the site of five derailments due to the rockfalls, occurring in 1881, 1946, 1997, and in 2010, which proved the most significant.

On 6 June 2010, a two carriage train from Glasgow to Oban derailed near Falls of Cruachan station. The train derailed shortly before 8:53 p.m. and was left balanced precariously on a 15-metre (50 ft) embankment. There was also a minor fire, which was quickly put out using on-board fire extinguishers. Sixty passengers had been on board the train, but all were safely evacuated down the line to the station with no major injuries, although nine people had minor injuries. The train hit a boulder that had fallen onto the track. The driver later received a commendation for the action taken to protect passengers.

== The Falls of Cruachan Railway Viaduct ==
Falls of Cruachan Railway Viaduct
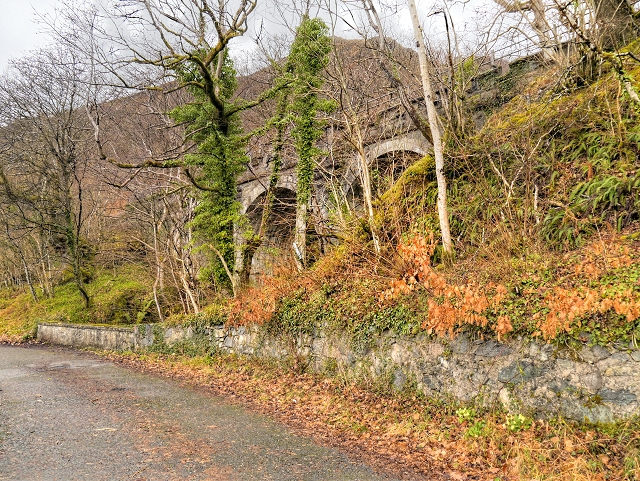
- Bridge hidden by foliage
- Coordinates: 56.3945°N 5.1142°W
- Carries: West Highland Line
- Crosses: Falls of Cruachan
- Locale: Argyll and Bute

Characteristics
- Design: Arch
- Material: Concrete
- Longest span: 24 feet (7.3 m)
- No. of spans: 3

History
- Designer: John Strain
- Opened: 1880

Listed Building – Category A
- Official name: Falls Of Cruachan Railway Viaduct
- Designated: 1 February 2007
- Reference no.: LB50811

Location
- Interactive map of Falls of Cruachan Railway Viaduct

The viaduct carries the West Highland Line over the Falls of Cruachan, near Loch Awe. It was engineered by John Strain in 1880, and was built for the Callander and Oban Railway. It was listed as a Category A listed building in 2007.

It has three arches, with a main centre span of 24 feet (7.3 m) and side arches of 19 feet (5.8 m). The piers are made of bull-faced stone, and the arches from mass concrete, a material not previously employed on British railways. There is a parapet with a central crenelation, topped with a recent steel safety rail.

The viaduct spans the small gully created by the Falls of Cruachan, close to the entrance to the pumped-storage Cruachan Power Station, which is located in a chamber within Ben Cruachan.

== Facilities ==
The station has no facilities bar an electronic display and a bench. There is no car park or drop-off point, as the only entrance is directly off the A85. The station does not have step-free access. As there are no facilities to purchase tickets, passengers must buy one in advance, or from the guard on the train. As the station does not have lighting, trains cannot call between dusk and dawn.

== Passenger volume ==
Passenger Volume at Falls of Cruachan
	2004–05	2005–06	2006–07	2007–08	2008–09	2009–10	2010–11	2011–12	2012–13	2013–14	2014–15	2015–16	2016–17	2017–18	2018–19	2019–20	2020–21	2021–22	2022–23	2023–24	2024–25
Entries and exits	124	108	154	160	218	204	200	258	244	498	654	734	734	726	538	626	134	492	888	1,478	1,782

The statistics cover twelve month periods that start in April.

== Services ==
All services at Falls of Cruachan are operated by ScotRail. However, unlike other stations on the line, the station is only open in the summer months from March to October every year. Trains can only stop here during daylight hours as the station has no lighting.

When the station is operational, there are five trains each way (eastbound to Glasgow Queen Street, westbound to Oban) on weekdays and Saturdays, along with four each way on Sundays.

Preceding station	National Rail	Following station
Loch Awe	ScotRail; West Highland Line	Taynuilt
	Historical railways	
Loch Awe; Line and Station open	Callander and Oban Railway; Operated by Caledonian Railway	Taynuilt; Line and Station open

== Bibliography ==
- Butt, R. V. J. (October 1995). The Directory of Railway Stations: details every public and private passenger station, halt, platform and stopping place, past and present (1st ed.). Sparkford: Patrick Stephens Ltd. ISBN 978-1-85260-508-7. OCLC 60251199. OL 11956311M.
- Fryer, Charles (1989). The Callander and Oban Railway. Oxford: Oakwood Press. ISBN 0-8536-1377-X. OCLC 21870958.
- Jowett, Alan (March 1989). Jowett's Railway Atlas of Great Britain and Ireland: From Pre-Grouping to the Present Day (1st ed.). Sparkford: Patrick Stephens Ltd. ISBN 978-1-85260-086-0. OCLC 22311137.
