= Tyndrum Lower railway station =

Railway station in Stirling, Scotland

Tyndrum Lower Scottish Gaelic: Taigh an Droma Ìochdrach
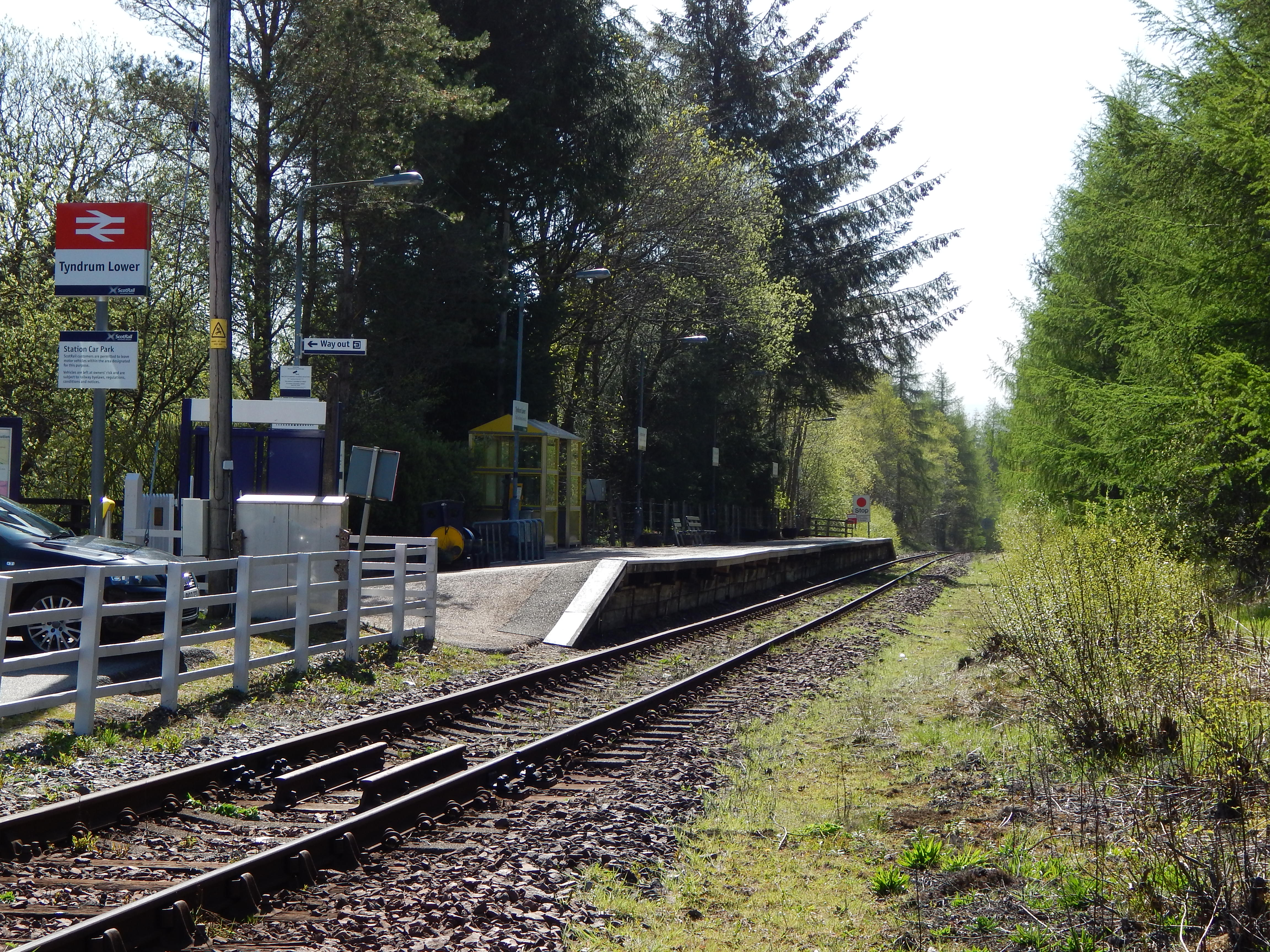

General information
- Location: Tyndrum, Stirling; Scotland
- Coordinates: 56.4336°N 4.7135°W
- Grid reference: NN327301
- Manager: ScotRail
- Platforms: 1

Other information
- Station code: TYL

History
- Original company: Callander and Oban Railway
- Pre-grouping: Callander and Oban Railway operated by Caledonian Railway
- Post-grouping: LMS

Key dates
- 1 August 1873: Original terminus opened as Tyndrum
- 1 May 1877: Original terminus closed
- 1 May 1877: Through station opened as Tyndrum
- 28 February 1956: Renamed as Tyndrum Lower

Passengers
- 2021/22: ▲3,386
- Interchange: 829
- 2022/23: ▲4,650
- Interchange: ▲1,343
- 2023/24: ▲6,382
- Interchange: ▲1,506
- 2024/25: ▼5,986
- 2025/26: ▲7,134
Location
Notes
- Passenger statistics from the Office of Rail and Road

Tyndrum Lower railway station is one of two railway stations serving the small village of Tyndrum in Scotland, the other being Upper Tyndrum. This station is on the Oban branch of the West Highland Line, originally part of the Callander and Oban Railway. It is sited 34 miles 70 chains (56.1 km) from Callander via Glen Ogle, between Crianlarich and Dalmally. ScotRail manage the station and operate all services.

== History ==
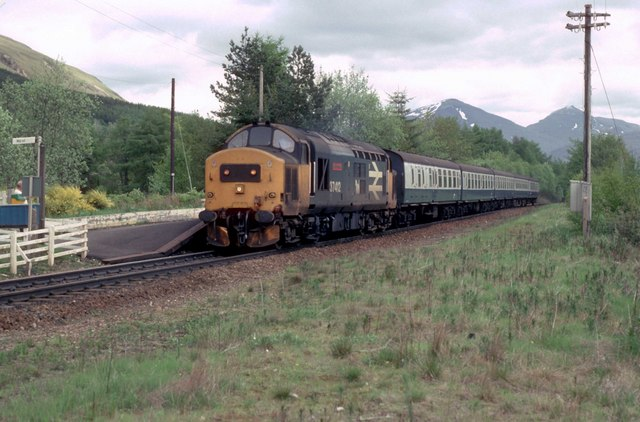
Train stopping at Tyndrum Lower with a service from Glasgow Queen Street to Oban (1986)

This station opened on 1 August 1873 as a terminal station. This was the first railway station in the village of Tyndrum. Until 1877, it was the western extremity of the Callander and Oban Railway.

In 1877, the Callander and Oban Railway was extended from Tyndrum to Dalmally. Concurrently, the station was relocated 301 yards (275 m) west, onto the new through alignment.

In 1894, the West Highland Railway opened a second station in Tyndrum, north of the village. In 1953, the prefix "Upper" and suffix "Lower" were added to the station names. Services to Callander & Dunblane over the old C&O route via Strathyre ceased on 27 September 1965 - they had been scheduled for withdrawal as a result of the Beeching Axe from 1 November that year, but ended five weeks prior to that date following a landslide in Glen Ogle that blocked the trackbed.

== Facilities ==
The station is equipped with a shelter, a bench, bike racks, a help point and a car park, to which there is step-free access from the platform. As there are no facilities to purchase tickets, passengers must buy one in advance, or from the guard on the train.

== Passenger volume ==
Passenger Volume at Tyndrum Lower
	2004–05	2005–06	2006–07	2007–08	2008–09	2009–10	2010–11	2011–12	2012–13	2013–14	2014–15	2015–16	2016–17	2017–18	2018–19	2019–20	2020–21	2021–22	2022–23	2023–24	2024–25
Entries and exits	8,057	7,481	17	4,577	4,552	4,146	3,856	3,698	3,928	4,082	5,334	5,488	5,510	5,364	5,996	5,128	858	3,386	4,650	6,382	5,986
Interchanges	0	0	0	0	0	0	0	0	0	0	0	0	0	0	0	1,399	302	829	1,343	1,506	0

The statistics cover twelve month periods that start in April.

== Services ==
Six trains in each direction call Mondays to Saturdays, with three departures each way on Sundays all year. There is an additional train each way in summer only.

Preceding station	National Rail	Following station
Crianlarich	ScotRail; West Highland Line	Dalmally
	Historical railways	
Crianlarich; Line and station open	Callander and Oban Railway; Crianlarich Link Line; Operated by Caledonian Railway	Dalmally; Line and station open
Crianlarich Lower; Line and station closed	Callander and Oban Railway; Operated by Caledonian Railway	Dalmally; Line and station open

== Bibliography ==
- Brailsford, Martyn, ed. (December 2017) [1987]. Railway Track Diagrams 1: Scotland & Isle of Man (6th ed.). Frome: Trackmaps. ISBN 978-0-9549866-9-8.
- Butt, R. V. J. (October 1995). The Directory of Railway Stations: details every public and private passenger station, halt, platform and stopping place, past and present (1st ed.). Sparkford: Patrick Stephens Ltd. ISBN 978-1-85260-508-7. OCLC 60251199. OL 11956311M.
- Fryer, Charles (1989). The Callander and Oban Railway. Oxford: Oakwood Press. ISBN 0-8536-1377-X. OCLC 21870958.
- Jowett, Alan (March 1989). Jowett's Railway Atlas of Great Britain and Ireland: From Pre-Grouping to the Present Day (1st ed.). Sparkford: Patrick Stephens Ltd. ISBN 978-1-85260-086-0. OCLC 22311137.
- Jowett, Alan (2000). Jowett's Nationalised Railway Atlas (1st ed.). Penryn, Cornwall: Atlantic Transport Publishers. ISBN 978-0-906899-99-1. OCLC 228266687.
- Quick, Michael (2023). Railway Passenger Stations in Great Britain: A Chronology (PDF) (5th ed.). London: Railway and Canal Historical Society.
