= Pass of Brander =

Mountain pass in Scotland

Coordinates: 56.40021°N 5.13330°W

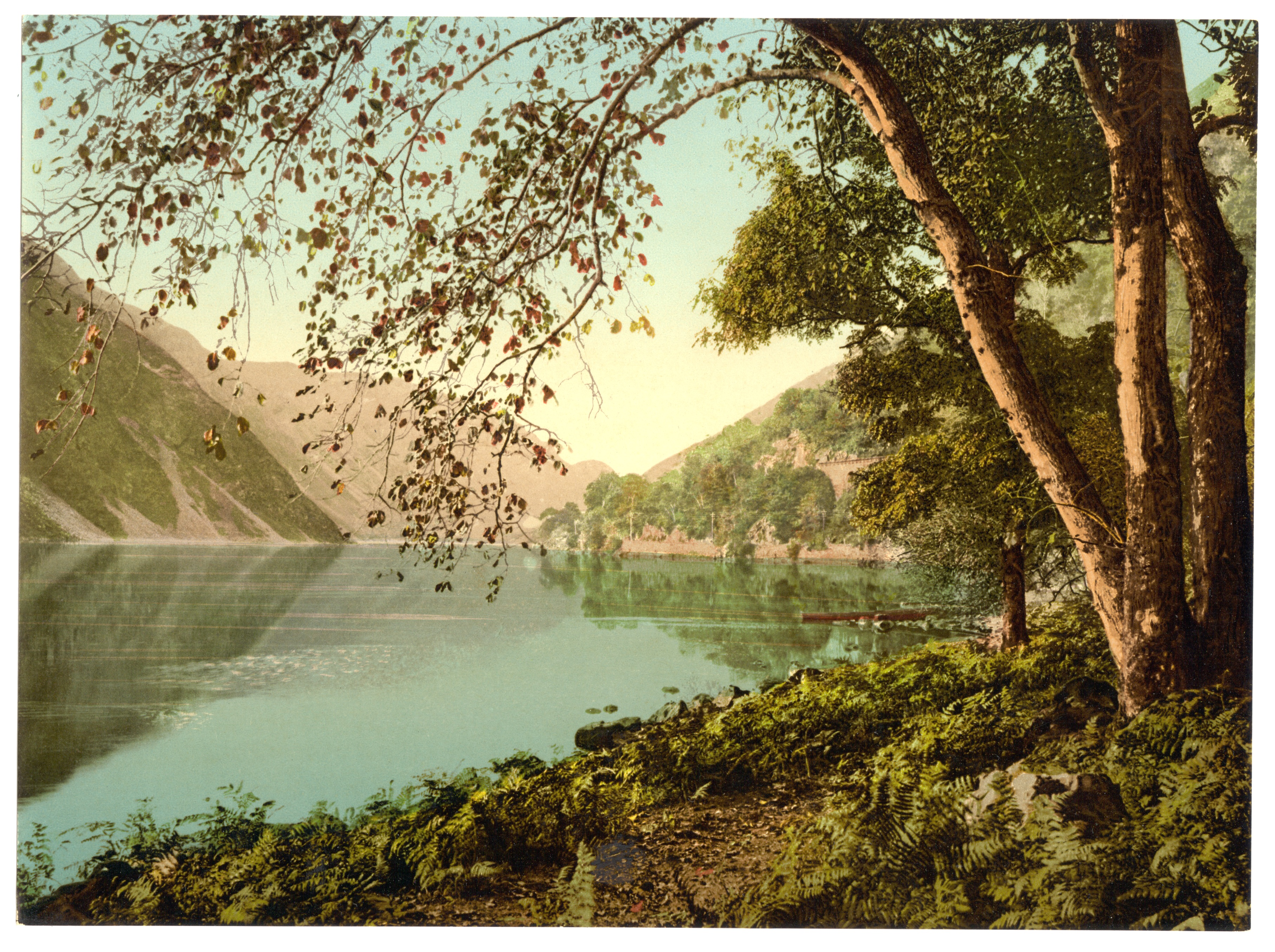
General view, Pass of Brander, Scotland

The Pass of Brander is a mountain pass in the Highlands of Scotland, where the main railway and road to Oban makes its way between Cruachan, a 3,689-foot (1,124 m) mountain, and Loch Awe.

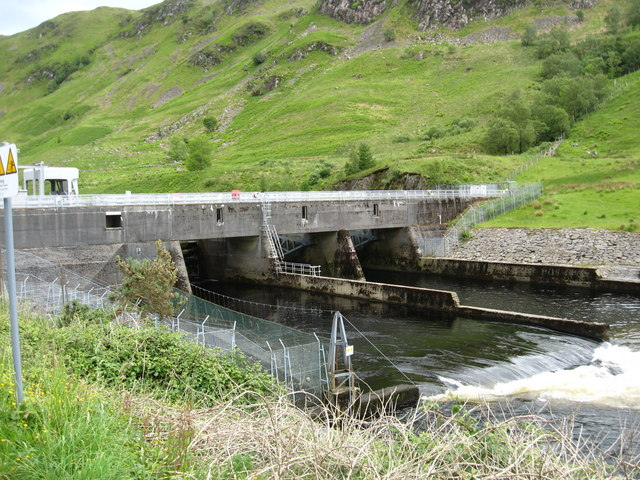
The Awe Barrage in the Pass of Brander

A conventional turbine power station was created by damming the River Awe in the Pass of Brander, feeding the water through underground pipes, and generating electricity as it flows into Loch Etive.

It is notable for the Battle of the Pass of Brander, an important victory by Robert the Bruce, and the Pass of Brander stone signals, known as Anderson's Piano, alongside the railway line, to guard against rockfalls.
