= Beinn a' Chochuill =

Mountain in Argyll and Bute, Scotland

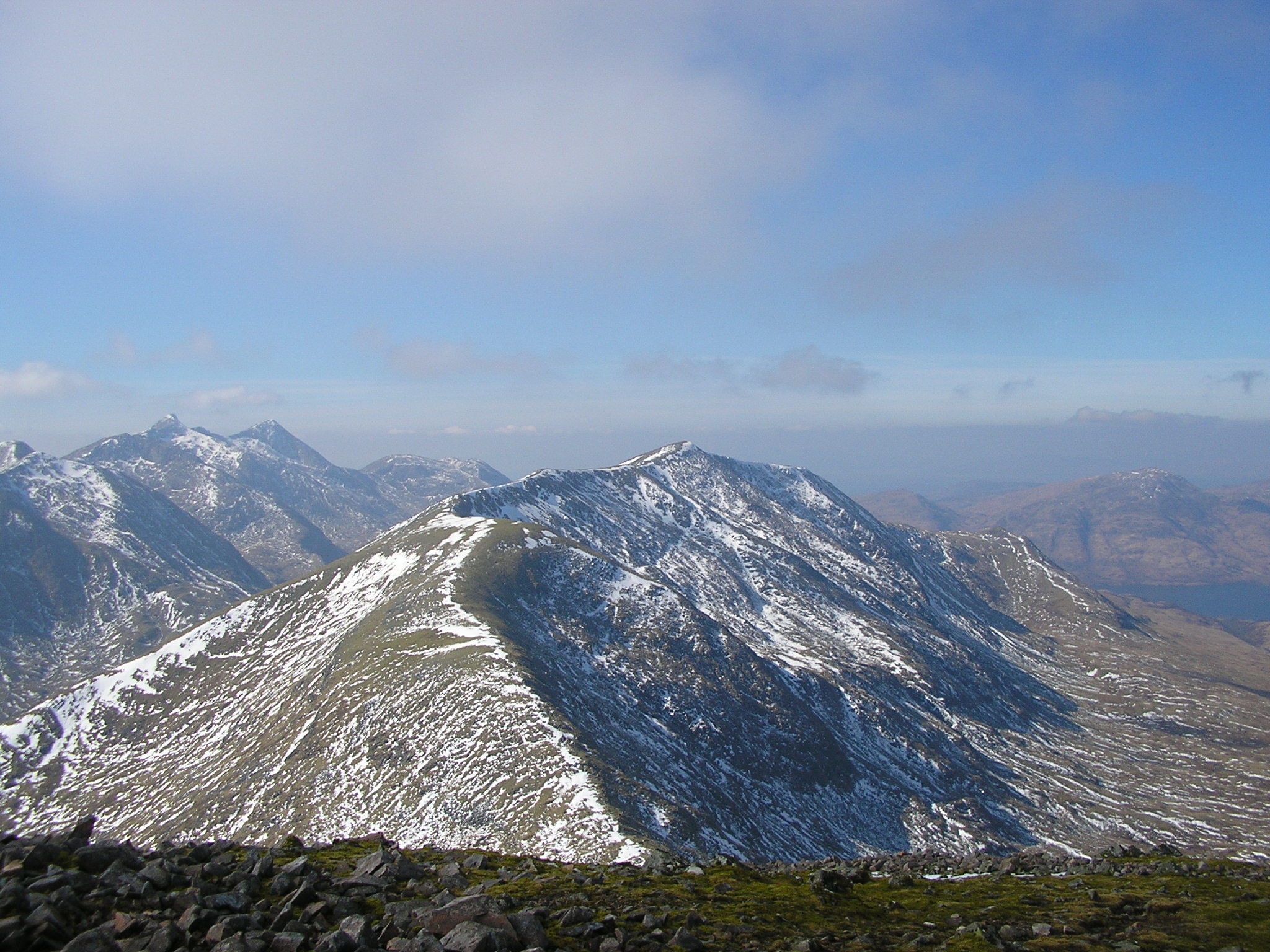
- Beinn a' Chochuill from the summit of Beinn Eunaich

Highest point
- Elevation: 980 m (3,220 ft)
- Prominence: 252 m (827 ft)
- Listing: Munro, Marilyn
- Coordinates: 56°26′59″N 5°04′07″W

Geography
- Location: Argyll and Bute, Scotland
- Parent range: Grampian Mountains
- OS grid: NN109328
- Topo map: OS Landranger 50

Beinn a' Chochuill (980 m) is a mountain in the Grampian Mountains of Scotland, located east of Loch Etive in Argyll and Bute.

Somewhat hidden away by the Ben Cruachan range, it is usually climbed in conjunction with its neighbour Beinn Eunaich. It has a long summit ridge and offers views of the Cruachan range from its summit. The nearest village is Lochawe.
