= Beinn a' Bhuiridh =

Mountain in Argyll and Bute, Scotland

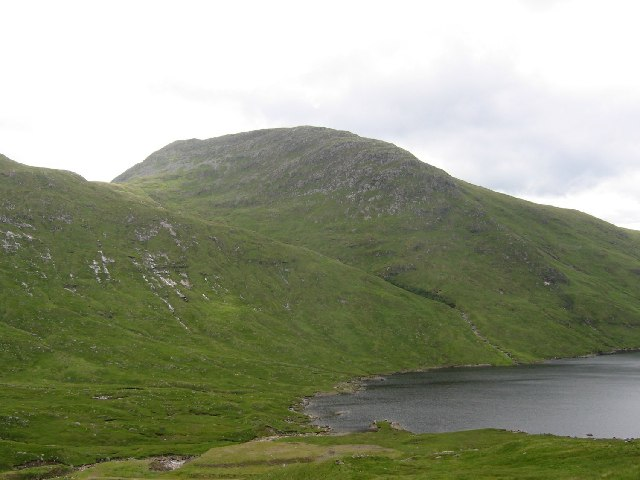
- Beinn a' Bhuiridh

Highest point
- Elevation: 897 m (2,943 ft)
- Prominence: 169 m (554 ft)
- Listing: Corbett, Marilyn
- Coordinates: 56°24′32″N 5°05′26″W

Geography
- Location: Argyll and Bute, Scotland
- Parent range: Grampian Mountains
- OS grid: NN094283
- Topo map: OS Landranger 50

Beinn a' Bhuidhe (IPA:[ˈpeiɲˈaˈvɯi.ə] (897 m) is a mountain in the Grampian Mountains of Scotland, west of the village of Dalmally in Argyll and Bute.

The mountain is the easternmost peak on the Ben Cruachan horseshoe, and is often climbed together with its neighbours, from which it is separated by with a steep northern flank.
