= Beinn Eunaich =

Mountain in Scotland

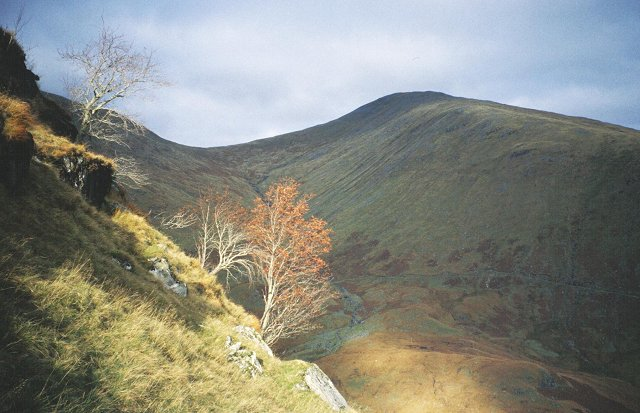
- Beinn Eunaich on the right

Highest point
- Elevation: 989 m (3,245 ft)
- Prominence: 425 m (1,394 ft)
- Listing: Munro, Marilyn
- Coordinates: 56°27′00″N 5°01′35″W

Geography
- Location: Argyll and Bute, Scotland
- Parent range: Grampian Mountains
- OS grid: NN135327
- Topo map: OS Landranger 50

Beinn Eunaich (989 m) is a mountain in the Grampian Mountains of Scotland, located north of the village of Dalmally in Argyll and Bute.

The mountain rises steeply out of Glen Strae and is usually climbed in conjunction with its neighbour Beinn a' Chochuill.
