= Glen Orchy =

Coordinates: 56.48°N 4.82°W

Glen Orchy: Scottish Gaelic: Gleann Urchaidh
- Location within Argyll and Bute
- Council area: Argyll and Bute
- Lieutenancy area: Argyll and Bute
- Country: Scotland
- Sovereign state: United Kingdom
- Post town: Bridge of Orchy – Dalmally
- Postcode district: PA36 – PA33
- Dialling code: 01838
- Police: Scotland
- Fire: Scottish
- Ambulance: Scottish
- UK Parliament: Argyll, Bute and South Lochaber
- Scottish Parliament: Argyll and Bute

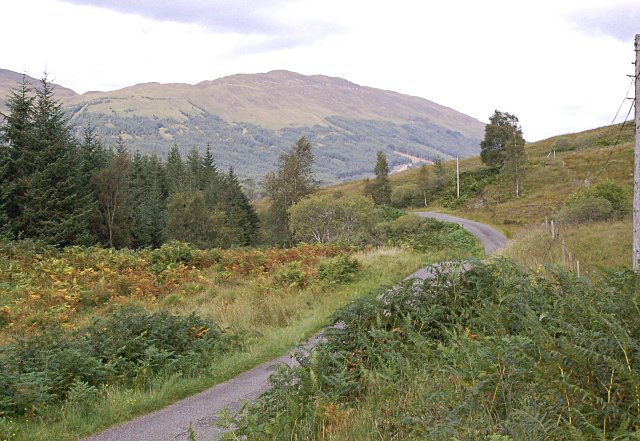
The B8074 road runs the length of Glen Orchy, generally following the line of the River Orchy, but not here, south of Arichastlich

Glen Orchy (Scottish Gaelic: Gleann Urchaidh) is a glen in Argyll and Bute, Scotland. It runs from Bridge of Orchy to Dalmally.

== Geography ==
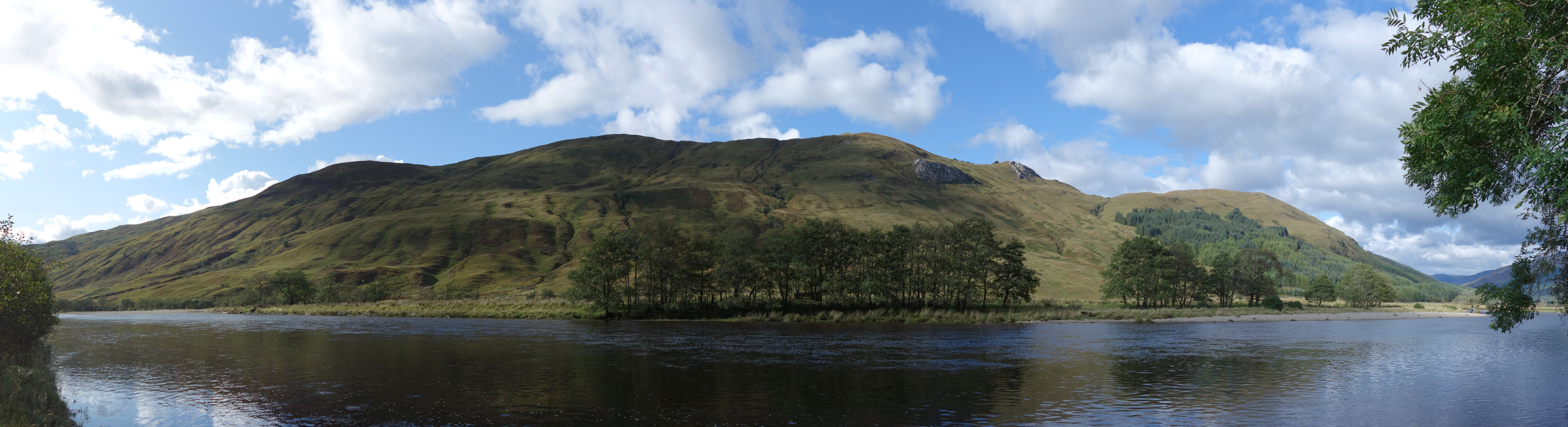
A view of Glen Orchy with the River Orchy in the foreground

Glen Orchy is about 17 km or 11 miles long, and runs south-west from Bridge of Orchy (grid reference NN298392) to Dalmally (grid reference NN194277) following the River Orchy through the Caledonian Forest. There are no settlements in the glen: just a few isolated buildings. The Eas Urchaidh and Eas a’ Chathaidh are waterfalls within the glen. The continuation westward past Dalmally to Loch Awe is known as the Strath of Orchy. The B8074 road runs the length of Glen Orchy.

== Name ==
Glen Orchy was known by the by-name of Gleann Urchaidh nam badan (Glen Orchy of the copses), and the parish of Glen Orchy was An Dìseart (the hermitage), a name appearing in Clachan an Dìseirt (the village of the hermitage), the local Gaelic name of the village of Dalmally.

== History ==
Glen Orchy was one of the major homes of Clan Gregor until the clan was outlawed in 1603 by King James VI. The settlement of Glenorchy, in New Zealand, was named after Glen Orchy.

== Notable people ==
One of the better known inhabitants of the glen was Duncan Ban MacIntyre.

== Sport ==
Glenorchy Camanachd is a shinty team from Dalmally in the Strath of Orchy.

== In popular culture ==
"The Bridge at Glen Orchy" is referred to in the 1995 film Rob Roy, as the place where Rob Roy MacGregor (Liam Neeson) is to be lynched for rustling the cattle and kidnapping the Factor of the Duke of Montrose (John Hurt).

== See also ==
- Map of places in Glen Orchy compiled from this article
