= Loch Awe railway station =

Railway station in Argyll and Bute, Scotland

Loch Awe Scottish Gaelic: Loch Obha
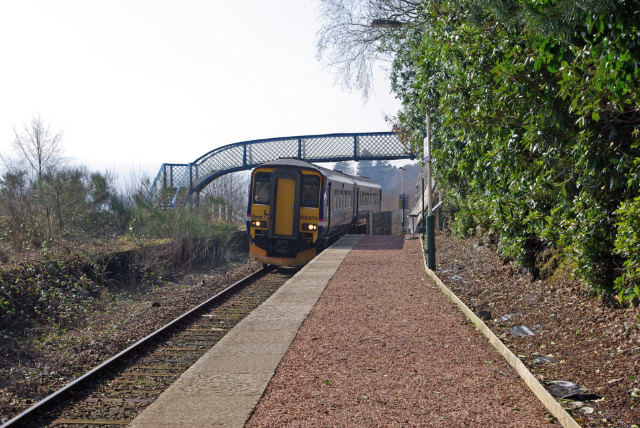
- An Oban to Glasgow train approaching Loch Awe station

General information
- Location: Loch Awe, Argyll and Bute; Scotland
- Coordinates: 56.4021°N 5.0412°W
- Grid reference: NN124274
- Manager: ScotRail
- Platforms: 1

Other information
- Station code: LHA

History
- Original company: Callander and Oban Railway
- Pre-grouping: Callander and Oban Railway operated by Caledonian Railway

Key dates
- 1 July 1880: Opened
- 5 May 1902: Second platform brought into use
- 1 November 1965: Closed
- 10 May 1985: Re-opened (using the newer platform)

Passengers
- 2021/22: ▲7,010
- 2022/23: ▲8,394
- 2023/24: ▼7,546
- 2024/25: ▼6,166
- 2025/26: ▲6,780
Location
Notes
- Passenger statistics from the Office of Rail and Road

Loch Awe railway station is a railway station serving the village of Lochawe, on the northern bank of Loch Awe, in western Scotland. This station is on the Oban branch of the West Highland Line, originally part of the Callander and Oban Railway. It is sited 49 miles 48 chains (79.8 km) from Callander via Glen Ogle, between Dalmally and Falls of Cruachan. ScotRail manage the station and operate all services.

== History ==
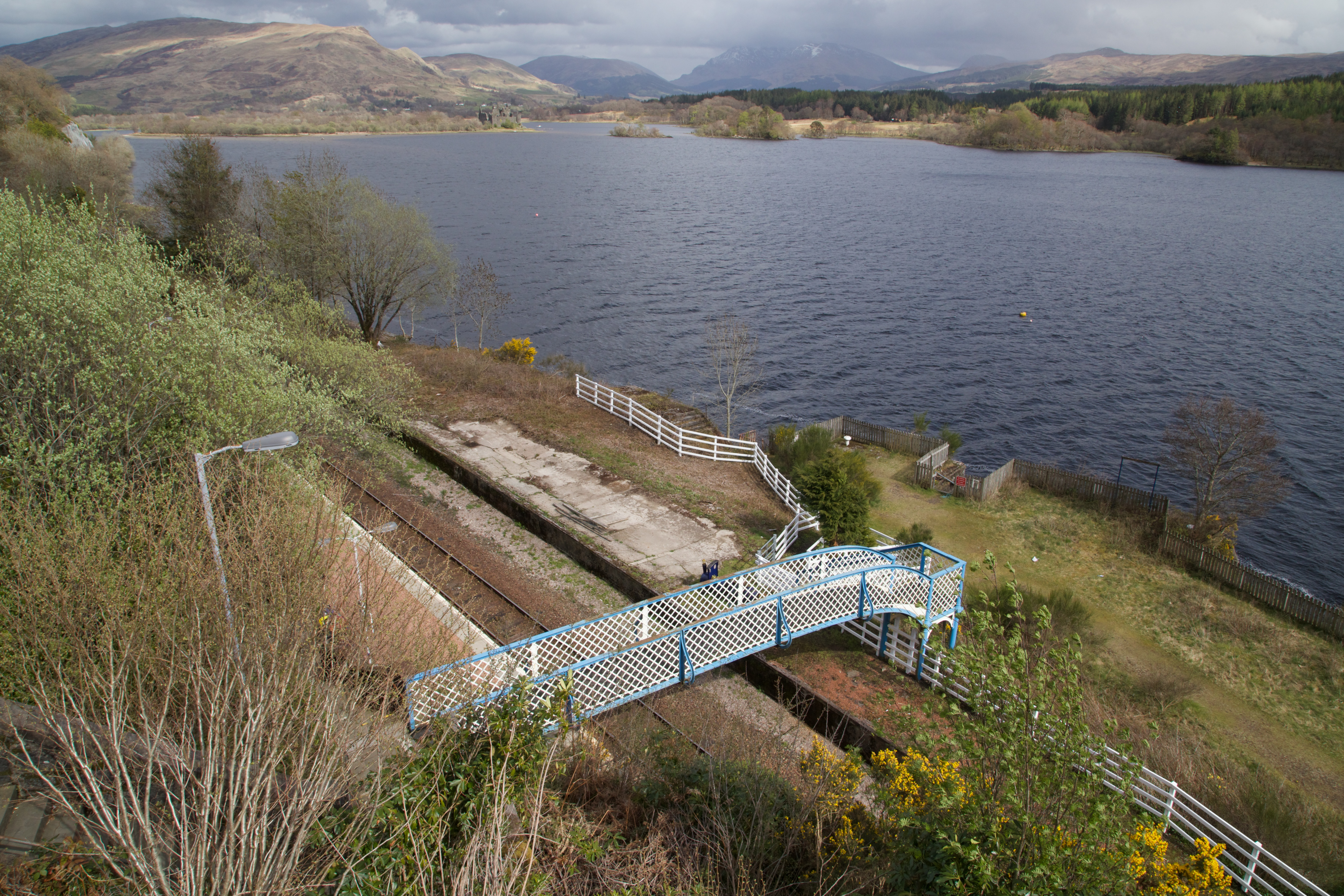
The station seen in 2015, with the old second platform clearly visible

This station was opened on 1 July 1880 by the Callander and Oban Railway when it opened the Dalmally to Oban section of line. The station originally had one platform on a passing loop with sidings on both sides of the line, but a second platform was later brought into use. On 8 August 1897, the station building was destroyed by fire.

A camping coach was also positioned here by the Scottish Region from 1952 to 1958, and two coaches were here in 1959 and 1960.

The station closed on 1 November 1965 but reopened on 10 May 1985 using only the more recent platform. The original platform remains in situ, but disused.

== Facilities ==
The station only comprises a shelter, a help point, a bench and a small car park. There is step-free access from the car park. As there are no facilities to purchase tickets, passengers must buy one in advance, or from the guard on the train.

== Passenger volume ==
Passenger Volume at Loch Awe
	2004–05	2005–06	2006–07	2007–08	2008–09	2009–10	2010–11	2011–12	2012–13	2013–14	2014–15	2015–16	2016–17	2017–18	2018–19	2019–20	2020–21	2021–22	2022–23	2023–24	2024–25
Entries and exits	2,446	2,775	2,168	2,321	2,526	2,926	3,160	2,544	2,726	3,034	4,752	4,804	4,140	5,394	5,002	5,512	4,562	7,010	8,394	7,546	6,166

The statistics cover twelve month periods that start in April.

== Services ==
There are 6 departures in each direction on weekdays and Saturdays, eastbound to Glasgow Queen Street and westbound to Oban. On weekdays only, an additional service in each direction between Dalmally and Oban calls here in the late afternoon. On Sundays, there are 3 departures each way throughout the year, plus a fourth in the summer months only which operates to Edinburgh Waverley from late June–August.

Preceding station	National Rail	Following station
Dalmally	ScotRail; West Highland Line	Falls of Cruachan or Taynuilt
	Historical railways	
Dalmally; Line and Station open	Callander and Oban Railway; Operated by Caledonian Railway	Falls of Cruachan; Line and Station open

== Bibliography ==
- Butt, R. V. J. (October 1995). The Directory of Railway Stations: details every public and private passenger station, halt, platform and stopping place, past and present (1st ed.). Sparkford: Patrick Stephens Ltd. ISBN 978-1-85260-508-7. OCLC 60251199. OL 11956311M.
- Fryer, Charles (1989). The Callander and Oban Railway. Oxford: Oakwood Press. ISBN 0-8536-1377-X. OCLC 21870958.
- Jowett, Alan (March 1989). Jowett's Railway Atlas of Great Britain and Ireland: From Pre-Grouping to the Present Day (1st ed.). Sparkford: Patrick Stephens Ltd. ISBN 978-1-85260-086-0. OCLC 22311137.
