= Railway slide fence =

Structural fence designed to physically stop falling rocks from reaching the tracks

A slide fence is a structural fence designed to physically stop falling rocks from reaching the tracks. The fence is designed to retain a rockslide if possible, but if it is displaced by such it also can cause the signaling system to display a restrictive aspect to approaching trains.

== Operation ==
=== Mechanical ===
The mechanical slide fence parallel to the rails consists of a series of tensioned wires strung about 10 inches (25 cm) apart on poles. When a rock slide occurs, one or more of the wires may break, allowing heavy weights attached to either end to drop. This triggers the protecting signals to the 'danger' position.

=== Electrical ===
There are two types of electrical slide fences in operation in the United States, as described in section 5.1.12 of the AREMA C&S Manual.

One type of electrical slide fence consists of a series of parallel conductive wires strung about 8 inches (20 cm) apart on poles that create a fence parallel to the rails. An electrical circuit through these wires is monitored by signaling equipment. In normal operation, the electric current in the fence wires continuously energizes a relay, sending an indication that the fence is intact. If a rock slide occurs, one or more of the wires is broken, interrupting the current. This allows the relay to open, indicating that a slide has occurred thus causing the approaching signals to display a stop or slow aspect. Restoring normal operation requires splicing the broken fence wires back together after the right of way has been cleared.

Another type of slide fence is similar except that the wires do not have to break and thus it is easier to maintain and reset. This slide fence consists of a series of fence sections, typically as shown in the SLIDE FENCE DETAIL drawing (pictured right). Each fence section is held in place by strong springs. At each end are electro-mechanical plugs, which maintain a continuous electrical circuit that is monitored by signaling equipment. In normal operation, the current through the plugs energizes a relay, thus indicating that the fence is in place. When a rock slide occurs, the fence moves laterally, causing a plug to pull out. This breaks the circuit, allowing the relay to denergize thus preventing the approaching signals from displaying unrestricted aspects.

=== Structural fence ===
The structural fence is a physical barrier designed to stop falling rocks from reaching the tracks. Several methods are used, including steel I-beams, wooden barriers, and galvanized fencing. Alternatively, netting can be installed directly against the rock.

== Where used ==
=== North America ===
A slide fence is typically found in a rock-cut area, where rocks could fall on the track and present a danger to approaching trains. The length of the fence may range from 100 feet (30 meters) to several miles (kilometers), depending on the length of the rock cut and the area being protected. The slide fence is usually located on the uphill side of the track in the slide area.

=== Europe ===
On approach to Aix-les-Bains on banks of Lac du Bourget

Used extensively throughout French Alps, where passenger trains routinely travel at speeds in excess of 200kph through areas prone to rock slides. In many locations, structures have been installed as a roof over the tracks to allow rock falls to occur without effect, but in many others these fences are in use.

== Consequences of slide fence activation ==
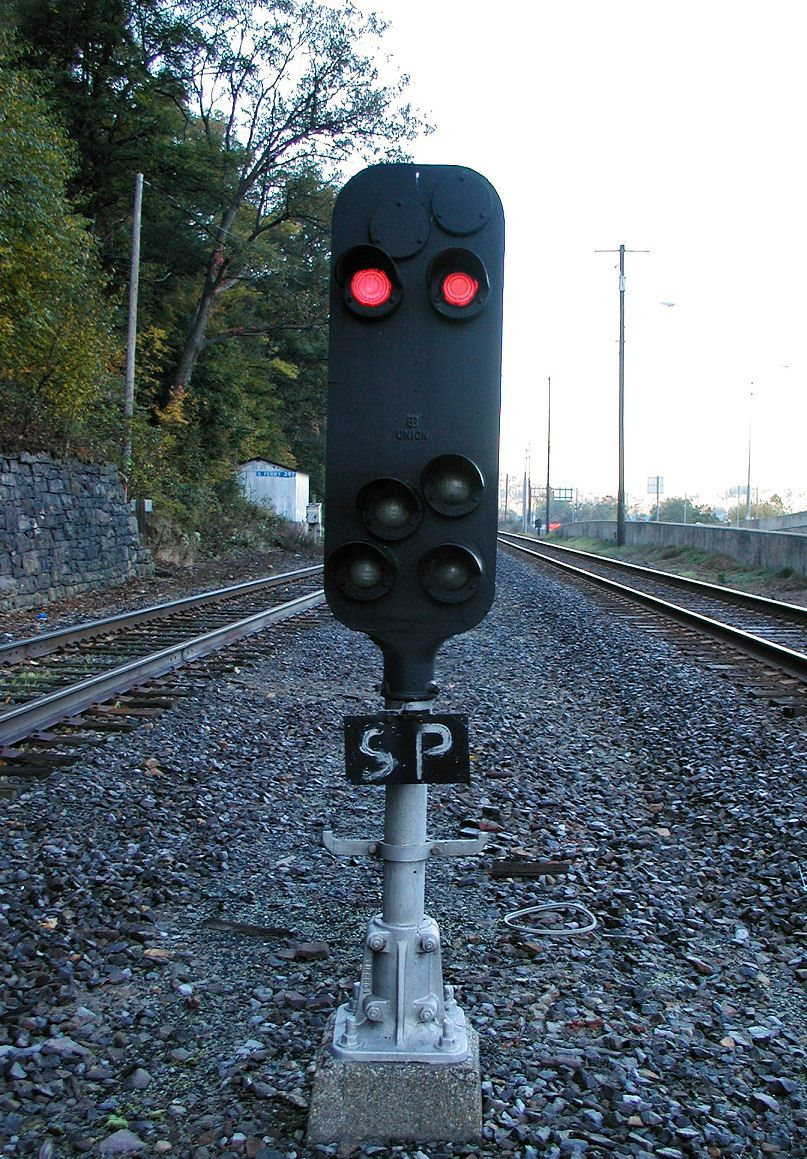
Hand-written slide protection placard on a PRR Pedestal type signal at CP-SOUTH FERRY indicates to engine crews that this signal is connected to a slide detector.

When a train approaches a slide fence area and the signal displays a restrictive aspect, the train is not permitted to proceed normally because a rock slide may have occurred. However, the slide may not prevent the safe passage of the train. For example, a large rock may have fallen off the cliff, broken through the slide fence, and continued to fall away from the track. After stopping, the train may obtain permission from the dispatch center to proceed slowly, watching for a dangerous rock slide. If the train is able to successfully pass through the slide area (that is, there is no remaining danger), that train will then be allowed to proceed normally. However, once the slide fence has been activated (even if in error), all trains must traverse the area with caution until the fence is repaired by maintenance personnel. This may result in several hours of delay in train service.

In North America slide fences are typically connected in such a way as to shunt the track circuit when activated. This causes signals on either side of the slide fence to display a restricting indication, requiring trains to travel at a speed enabling them to stop within one-half the range of vision. On lines formerly operated by the Pennsylvania Railroad, signals connected to a slide detector have an 'SP' placard, reminding engineers to watch for slides when governed by any restrictive speed signal.

== Alternatives ==
Several alternative technologies have been tried to solve the rock slide problem, including:

- Acoustic sensing
- Avalanche control
- Electromagnetic sensing
- Fiber optics buried parallel to ROW
- Seismic sensing
- Distributed acoustic sensing
- Visual sensing, using cameras

== See also ==
- Pass of Brander stone signals
