= Dalmally railway station =

Railway station in Argyll and Bute, Scotland

Dalmally Scottish Gaelic: Dail Mhàilidh
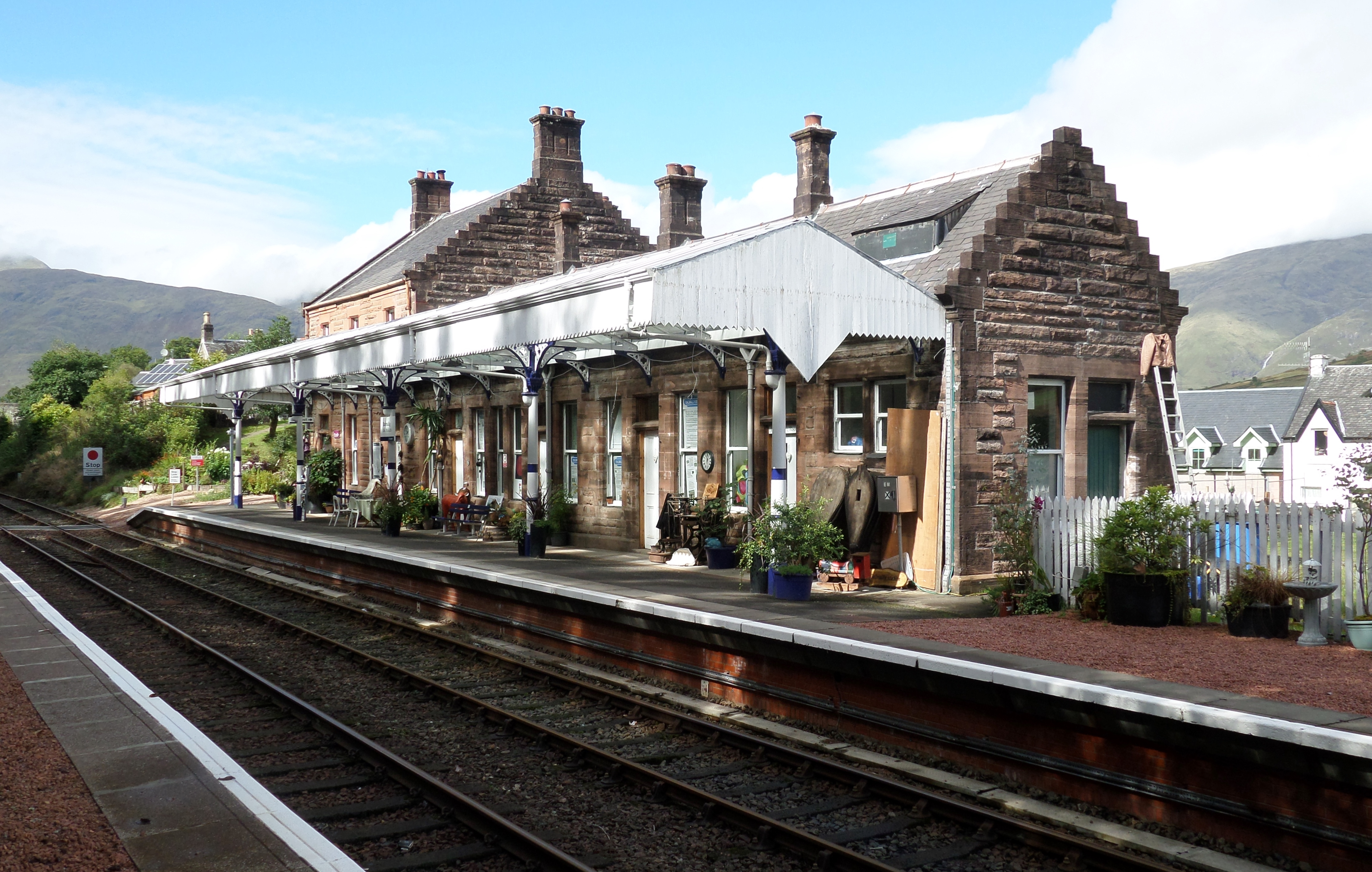
- Dalmally station building

General information
- Location: Dalmally, Argyll and Bute; Scotland
- Coordinates: 56.4010°N 4.9829°W
- Grid reference: NN159272
- Manager: ScotRail
- Platforms: 2

Other information
- Station code: DAL

History
- Original company: Callander and Oban Railway
- Pre-grouping: Callander and Oban Railway operated by Caledonian Railway
- Post-grouping: LMS

Key dates
- 1 April 1877: Opened

Passengers
- 2021/22: ▲13,132
- 2022/23: ▲13,632
- 2023/24: ▲15,298
- 2024/25: ▼13,690
- 2025/26: ▲15,662

Listed Building – Category C(S)
- Designated: 13 September 1993
- Reference no.: LB13352
Location
Notes
- Passenger statistics from the Office of Rail and Road

Dalmally railway station is a railway station serving the village of Dalmally, near Loch Awe in Scotland. This station is on the Oban branch of the West Highland Line, originally part of the Callander and Oban Railway. It is sited 46 miles 76 chains (75.6 km) from Callander via Glen Ogle, between Tyndrum Lower and Loch Awe. ScotRail manage the station and operate all services.

== History ==
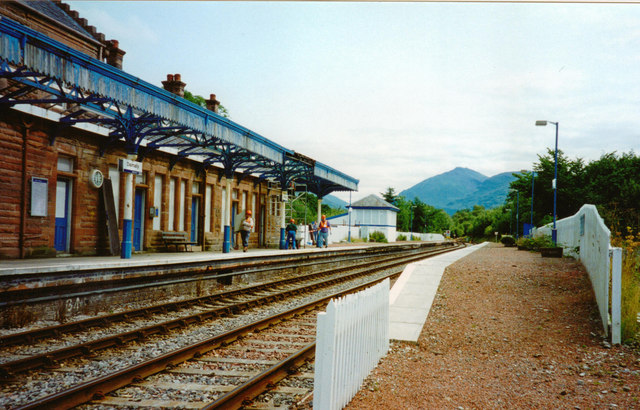
The station seen from platform 2

This station opened on 1 April 1877. For a while, it was the western extremity of the Callander and Oban Railway, until the line finally reached its ultimate destination, Oban, on 1 July 1880. The station building was destroyed by fire on 16 November 1898.

The red sandstone building and signal box are a Category C listed building as being a 'well detailed example of a small through station in the area'.

== Facilities ==
Facilities at the station are very basic, comprising just benches on both platforms, a help point and a small car park. There is step-free access to the station, but the only access to platform 2 is via a Barrow Crossing. As there are no facilities to purchase tickets, passengers must buy one in advance, or from the guard on the train.

== Passenger volume ==
Passenger Volume at Dalmally
	2004–05	2005–06	2006–07	2007–08	2008–09	2009–10	2010–11	2011–12	2012–13	2013–14	2014–15	2015–16	2016–17	2017–18	2018–19	2019–20	2020–21	2021–22	2022–23	2023–24	2024–25
Entries and exits	3,947	4,283	3,909	3,652	4,128	4,046	4,696	3,604	4,534	4,632	8,338	6,802	5,618	7,470	6,588	6,524	12,996	13,132	13,632	15,298	13,690

The statistics cover twelve month periods that start in April.

== Services ==
There are six departures in each direction Mondays to Saturdays, eastbound to Glasgow Queen Street and westbound to Oban. On weekdays only, an additional train to Oban operates in the late afternoon. On Sundays, there are three departures each way throughout the year, plus a fourth in the summer months only.

Preceding station	National Rail	Following station
Tyndrum Lower	ScotRail; West Highland Line	Loch Awe
Terminus	ScotRail; West Highland Line	Loch Awe
	Historical railways	
Tyndrum Lower; Line and Station open	Callander and Oban Railway; Operated by Caledonian Railway	Loch Awe; Line and Station open

== Bibliography ==
- Brailsford, Martyn, ed. (December 2017) [1987]. Railway Track Diagrams 1: Scotland & Isle of Man (6th ed.). Frome: Trackmaps. ISBN 978-0-9549866-9-8.
- Butt, R. V. J. (October 1995). The Directory of Railway Stations: details every public and private passenger station, halt, platform and stopping place, past and present (1st ed.). Sparkford: Patrick Stephens Ltd. ISBN 978-1-85260-508-7. OCLC 60251199. OL 11956311M.
- Fryer, Charles (1989). The Callander and Oban Railway. Oxford: Oakwood Press. ISBN 0-8536-1377-X. OCLC 21870958.
- Jowett, Alan (March 1989). Jowett's Railway Atlas of Great Britain and Ireland: From Pre-Grouping to the Present Day (1st ed.). Sparkford: Patrick Stephens Ltd. ISBN 978-1-85260-086-0. OCLC 22311137.
- Jowett, Alan (2000). Jowett's Nationalised Railway Atlas (1st ed.). Penryn, Cornwall: Atlantic Transport Publishers. ISBN 978-0-906899-99-1. OCLC 228266687.
- Quick, Michael (2023). Railway Passenger Stations in Great Britain: A Chronology (PDF) (5th ed.). London: Railway and Canal Historical Society.
- Thomas, John (1966). The Callander and Oban Railway (1st ed.). Newton Abbot, Devon: David & Charles. OCLC 2316816.
- Thomas, John; Farrington, J.H. (1990). The Callander and Oban Railway (2nd ed.). Newton Abbot, Devon: David St John Thomas. OCLC 60059451.
- Thomas, John (2000). The Callander and Oban Railway (3rd ed.). Newton Abbot, Devon: David St John Thomas. ISBN 0-9465-3761-5. OCLC 228266316.
