= Ben Cruachan =

Mountain in Argyll and Bute, Scotland

Coordinates: 56.42618°N 5.13280°W

- Cruachan Beann
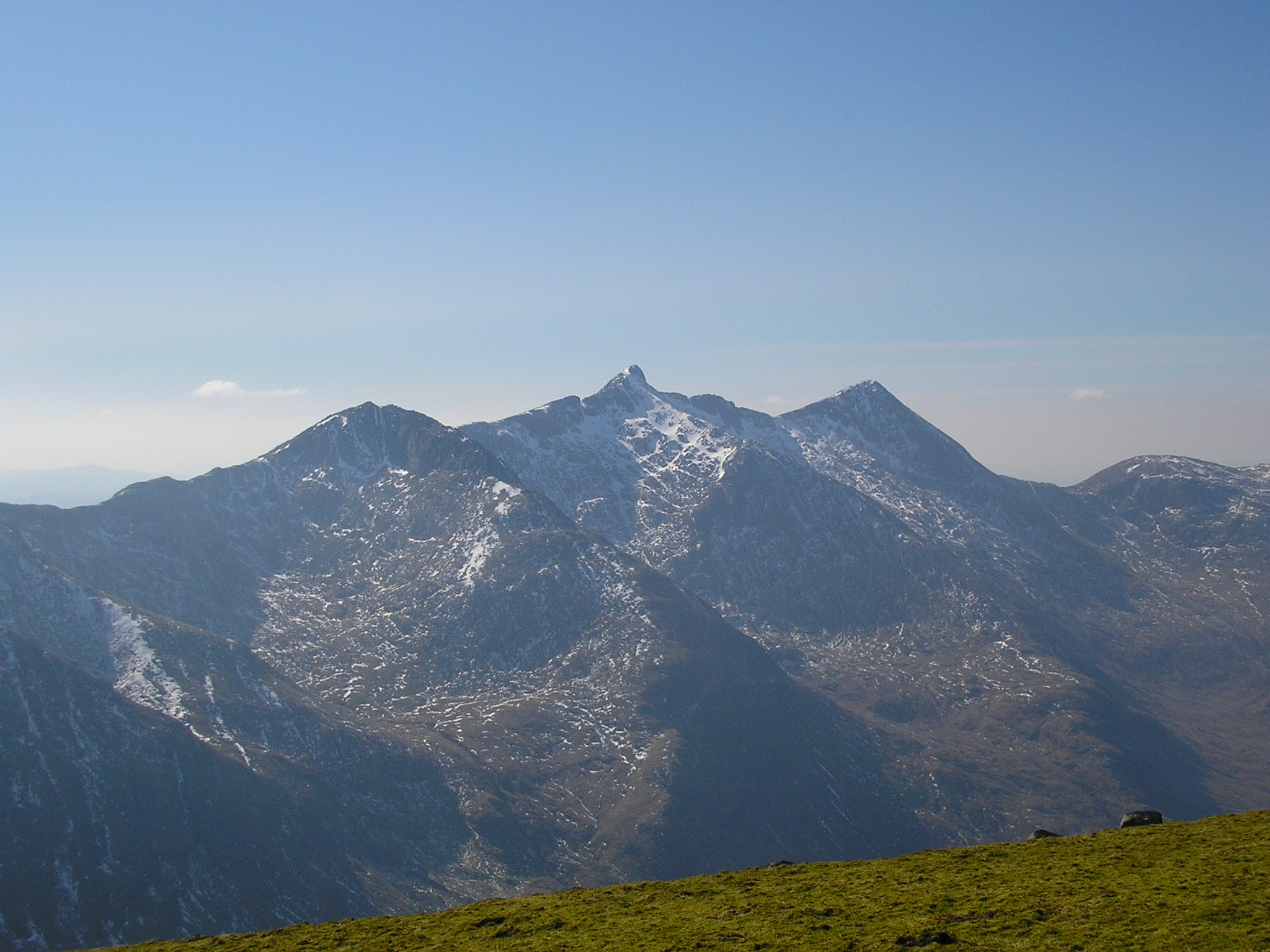
- Ben Cruachan

Highest point
- Elevation: 1,126 m (3,694 ft)
- Prominence: c. 881 m Ranked 14th in British Isles
- Parent peak: Ben Lawers
- Listing: Munro, Marilyn, Council top (Argyll and Bute)

Naming
- English translation: mountain of peaks
- Language of name: Gaelic
- Pronunciation: Scottish Gaelic: [ˈkʰɾuəx nə ˈpeɲə]

Geography
- Ben Cruachan in Argyll and Bute Ben Cruachan in Scotland
- Location: Loch Etive/Loch Awe, Scotland
- Parent range: Grampian Mountains
- OS grid: NN069304
- Topo map: OS Landranger 36

Ben Cruachan (Scottish Gaelic: Cruachan Beann) is a mountain that rises to 1,126 metres (3,694 ft), the highest in Argyll and Bute, Scotland. It gives its name to the Cruachan Dam, a pumped-storage hydroelectric power station located in a cavern inside the mountain. It is the high point of a ring of mountains, known as the Cruachan Horseshoe, that surrounds the power station reservoir. The horseshoe includes a further Munro (Stob Daimh), a Corbett (Beinn a' Bhuiridh), and several subsidiary summits. "Cruachan!" is the battle cry of Highland clans Campbell and MacIntyre.

== See also ==
- Ben Cruachan Quarry Branch
- Cailleach
- Falls of Cruachan railway station
- List of Munro mountains
- Mountains and hills of Scotland
