= Oban railway station =

Railway station in Argyll and Bute, Scotland

Oban Scottish Gaelic: An t-Òban

General information
- Location: Oban, Argyll and Bute; Scotland
- Coordinates: 56.4121°N 5.4749°W
- Grid reference: NM857298
- Manager: ScotRail
- Platforms: 2 (numbered 3 & 4)

Other information
- Station code: OBN

History
- Original company: Callander and Oban Railway
- Pre-grouping: Callander and Oban Railway operated by Caledonian Railway

Key dates
- 30 June 1880: Opened

Passengers
- 2020/21: ▼89,004
- 2021/22: ▲0.155 million
- 2022/23: ▲0.186 million
- 2023/24: ▲0.222 million
- 2024/25: ▼0.202 million
Location
Notes
- Passenger statistics from the Office of Rail and Road

Oban railway station is a railway station serving Oban in Scotland. It is the terminus of one branch of the highly scenic West Highland Line, sited 71 miles 44 chains (115.1 km) from Callander, via Glen Ogle. It was originally the terminus of the Callander and Oban Railway. All services are operated by ScotRail, who also manage the station.

Oban station provides interchange with the adjacent ferry terminal, offering connections to a number of destinations in the Inner and Outer Hebrides via ferry services operated by Caledonian MacBrayne (CalMac). Oban is CalMac's busiest ferry terminal.

== History ==
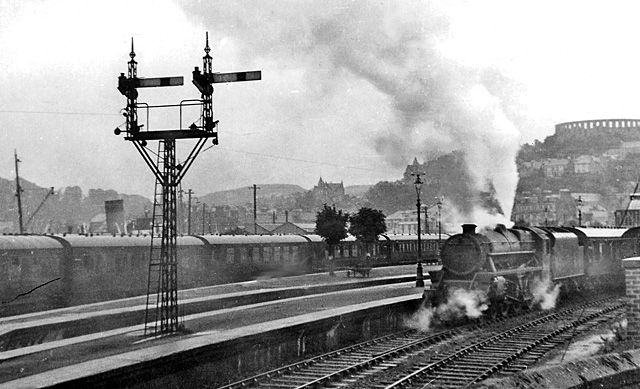
Oban station in 1948

Oban station opened on 30 June 1880 as the terminus of the Callander and Oban Railway, which joined the present railway at Crianlarich, and which was absorbed into the LMS Railway in 1922. Two additional platforms were constructed on the west side of the station in 1904, following the opening of the branch from Connel Ferry to Ballachulish. The route from Dunblane and Callander to Crianlarich closed in 1965, as well as the Ballachulish line. Formerly, a branch to Ballachulish railway station diverged just east of Connel Ferry railway station. A triangular junction was planned at Connel, but never completed.

The original station building was a large timber structure with an overall glass roof covering the platforms. A clock tower was located next to the entrance. By the 1980s the condition of the timber building was deteriorating and a new, very basic ticket office was built next to the old station. The original station was subsequently demolished.

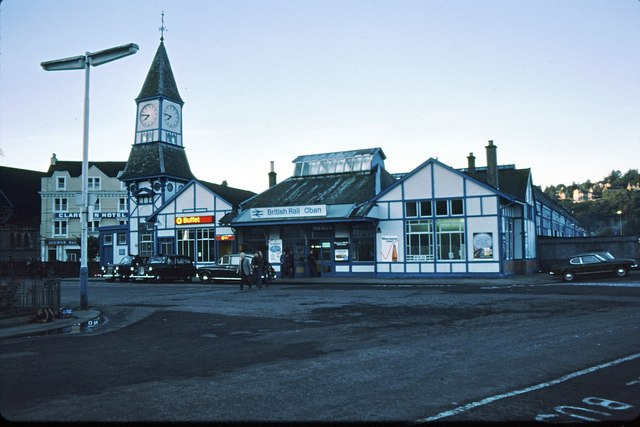
The old station building (1979)

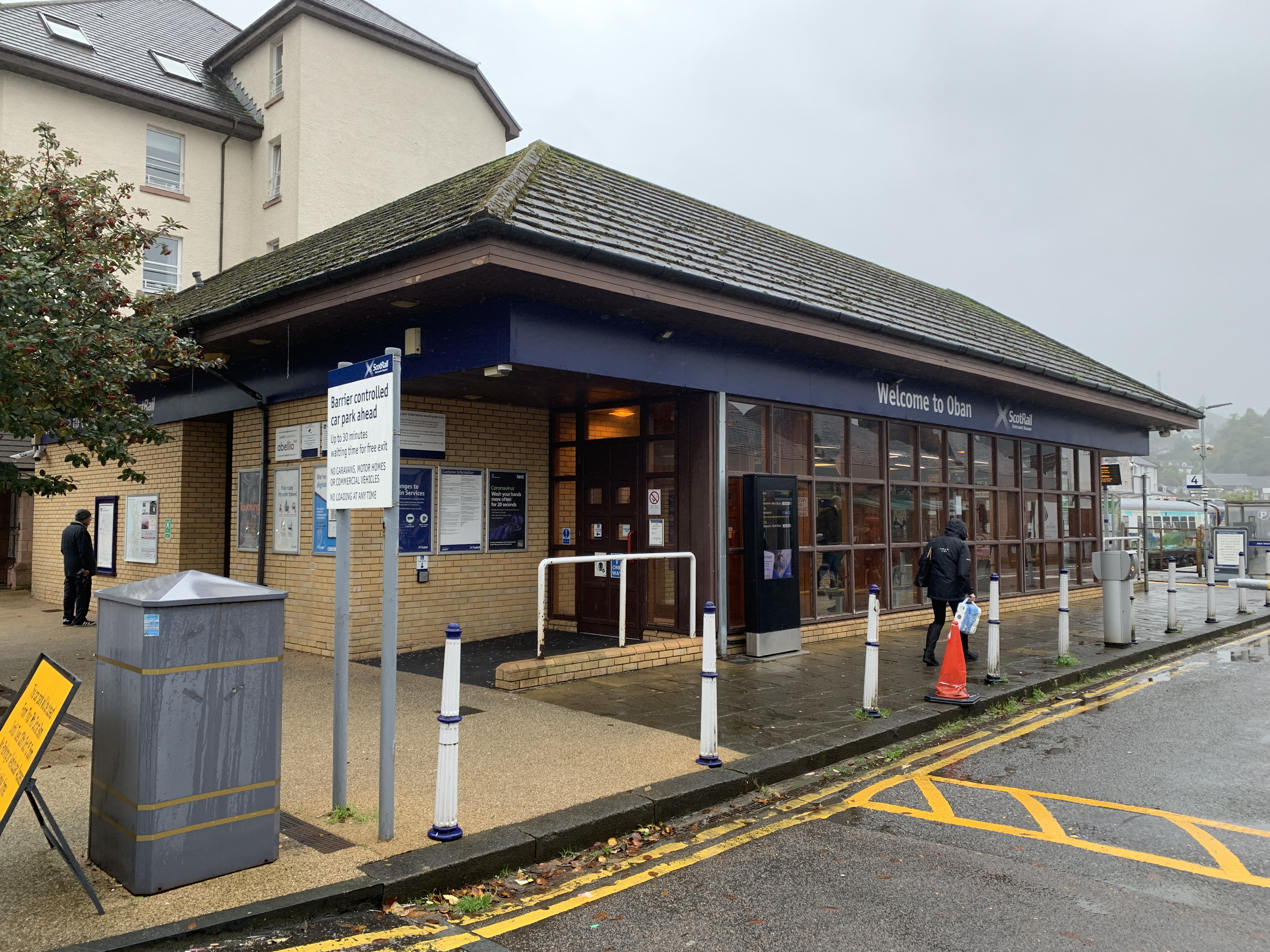
The current station building (2021)

== Facilities ==
The station is well-equipped with a ticket office, toilets, a help point, a car park, bike racks and a pay phone. All of the station has step-free access.

== Passenger volume ==
Passenger Volume at Oban
	2004–05	2005–06	2006–07	2007–08	2008–09	2009–10	2010–11	2011–12	2012–13	2013–14	2014–15	2015–16	2016–17	2017–18	2018–19	2019–20	2020–21	2021–22	2022–23	2023–24	2024–25
Entries and exits	113,830	110,000	109,053	108,903	126,676	119,876	121,746	125,900	122,568	129,311	170,682	176,104	164,332	181,172	177,522	169,174	89,004	154,970	186,138	221,968	201,750

The statistics cover twelve month periods that start in April.

== Services ==
ScotRail Class 156 with a service to Glasgow Queen Street

As of the May 2026 timetable, there are six trains on weekdays to Glasgow Queen Street, plus an additional afternoon service that runs only as far as Dalmally, primarily for schools traffic. On Saturdays, the service is very similar to that on weekdays, with the exception of the Dalmally train, which does not run. On Sundays there are four trains per day to Glasgow Queen Street all year round.

Preceding station	National Rail	Following station
Connel Ferry	ScotRail; West Highland Line	Terminus
	Historical railways	
Connel Ferry; Line and station open	Callander and Oban Railway; Caledonian Railway	Terminus

== Oban Ferry Terminal ==
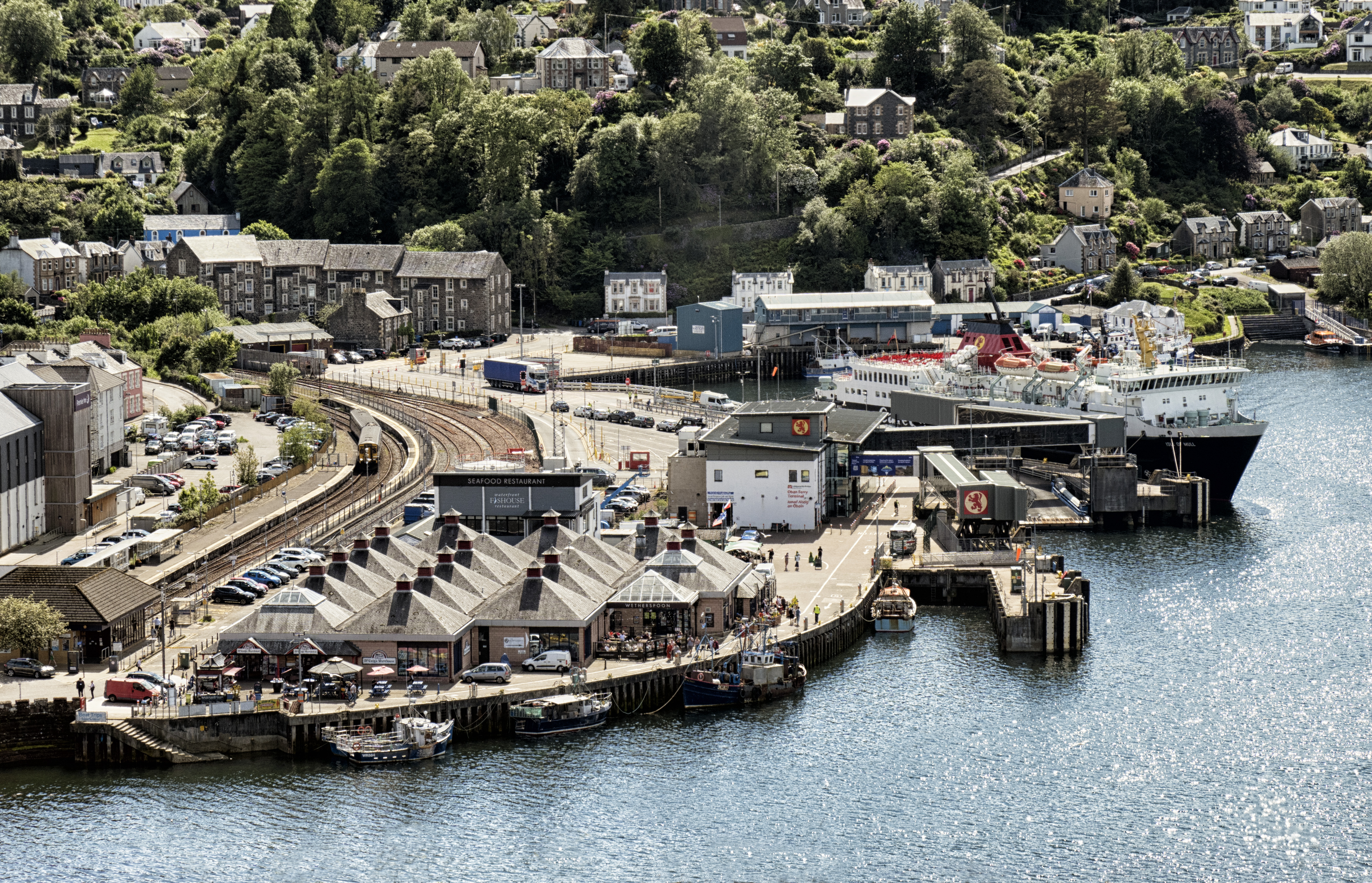
The ferry terminal next to the station

Oban station is located next to Oban ferry terminal. Caledonian MacBrayne ferries sail daily from here to the islands of Lismore, Colonsay, Coll, Tiree, to Craignure on Mull, to Castlebay on Barra and to Lochboisdale (winter only) on South Uist. Ferries also operate to Mallaig. The times of connecting trains to/from Glasgow Queen Street are included on CalMac timetables.

Preceding station	National Rail	Following station
	Ferry services	
Scalasaig	Caledonian MacBrayne; Oban – Colonsay	Terminus
Craignure	Caledonian MacBrayne; Oban – Mull	Terminus
Achnacroish	Caledonian MacBrayne; Oban – Lismore	Terminus
Scarinish	Caledonian MacBrayne; Oban – Coll & Tiree	Terminus
Arinagour	Caledonian MacBrayne; Oban – Coll & Tiree	Terminus
Castlebay	Caledonian MacBrayne; Oban – Barra	Terminus
Lochboisdale	Caledonian MacBrayne; Oban – South Uist (winter only)	Terminus

== Bibliography ==
- Butt, R. V. J. (October 1995). The Directory of Railway Stations: details every public and private passenger station, halt, platform and stopping place, past and present (1st ed.). Sparkford: Patrick Stephens Ltd. ISBN 978-1-85260-508-7. OCLC 60251199. OL 11956311M.
- Fryer, Charles (1989). The Callander and Oban Railway. Oxford: Oakwood Press. ISBN 0-8536-1377-X. OCLC 21870958.
- Jowett, Alan (March 1989). Jowett's Railway Atlas of Great Britain and Ireland: From Pre-Grouping to the Present Day (1st ed.). Sparkford: Patrick Stephens Ltd. ISBN 978-1-85260-086-0. OCLC 22311137.
- Quick, Michael (2023). Railway Passenger Stations in Great Britain: A Chronology (PDF) (5th ed.). London: Railway and Canal Historical Society.
