= Callander railway station =

Disused railway station in Scotland

Callander
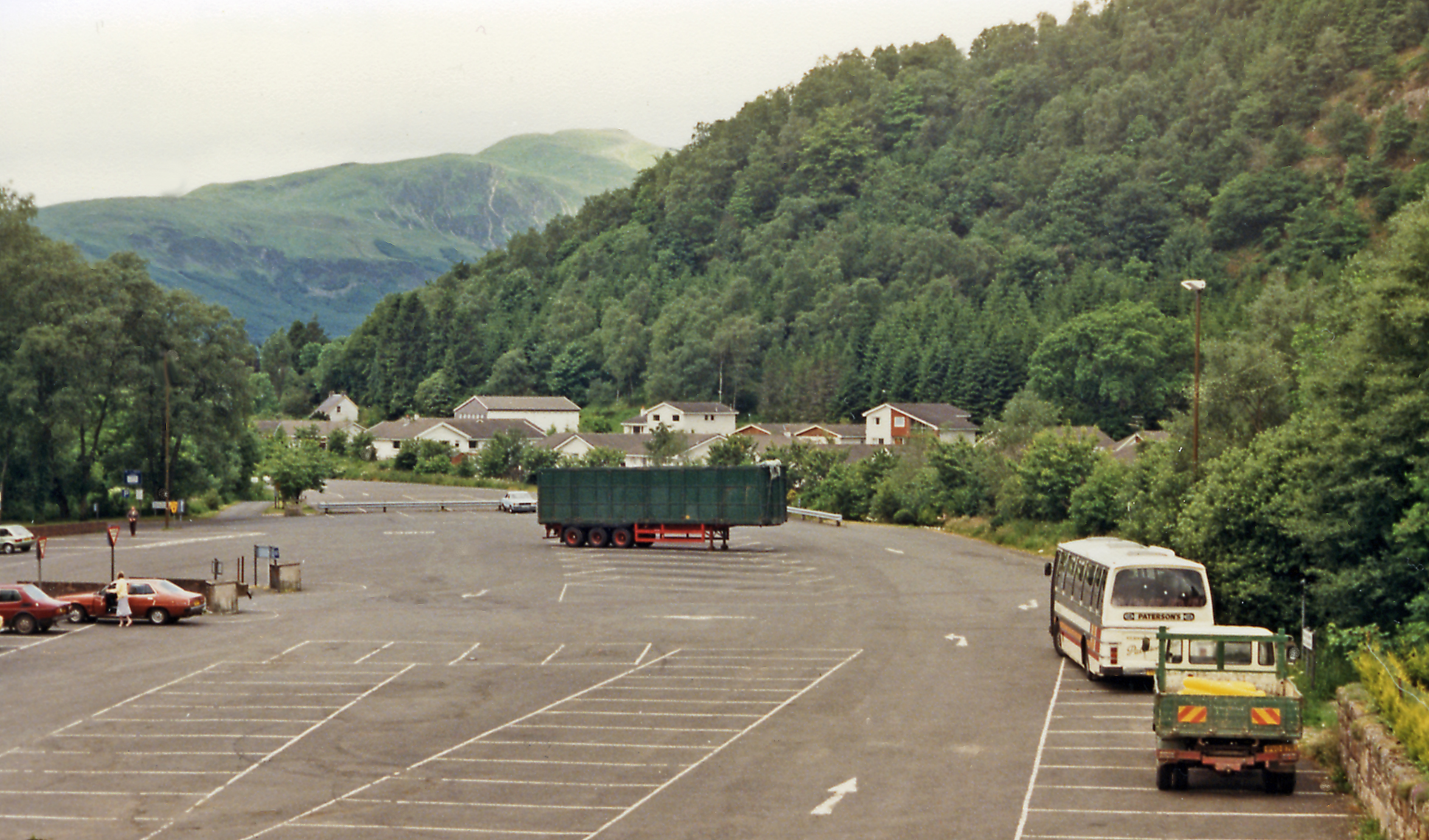
- Site of the station in 1986

General information
- Location: Callander, Stirling; Scotland
- Coordinates: 56.24590°N 4.21825°W
- Platforms: 5

Other information
- Status: Disused

History
- Original company: Callander and Oban Railway
- Pre-grouping: Callander and Oban Railway
- Post-grouping: LMSR

Key dates
- 1 July 1858: first station opened
- 1 June 1870: Second station opened
- 1 November 1965: Closed
Location

Callander was a railway station located in Callander, in the council area of Stirling, Scotland.

== History ==
The first station at Callander was a terminus opened by the Dunblane, Doune and Callander Railway on 1 July 1858. It was closed on 1 June 1870 when the second station was opened along with the first section of the Callander and Oban Railway, between Callander and Glenoglehead (originally named 'Killin'). The original terminal station of the Dunblane, Doune and Callander Railway become a goods yard.

The station underwent expansion in 1882.

Closure came on 1 November 1965, when the service between Callander and Dunblane ended as part of the Beeching Axe. The section between Callander and Crianlarich (lower) was closed on 27 September that year following a landslide at Glen Ogle.

The track to the west of the station was lifted in early 1967, and the track through the station was lifted in late 1968 and some demolition work was carried out. The station building itself was demolished in Spring 1973, and the station site became a car park, though a small section of the down platform still exists. The cast iron road bridge to the east of the station was infilled in 2012. The impressive iron-work on the bridge was refurbished at the same time as the infilling.

The site of the original Dunblane, Doune and Callander terminal station (latterly goods yard) is now occupied by housing.

=== Stationmasters ===
On 24 October 1882, some goods wagons were being shunted at the station. They contained building materials in connection with the rebuilding of the station. James Rennie, Stationmaster, was fatally injured whilst attempting to sprag one of the goods wagons. He missed his footing and fell in front of the leading wheel which passed over his right shoulder. Despite an operation to remove the damaged arm, he later succumbed to his injuries.

- James Rennie ca. 1874 - 1882
- Andrew A. Johnston 1882 - 1920 (formerly station master at Tyndrum)
- James McDonald 1920 - 1928
- Christopher M. Strang 1928 - 1932 (formerly station master at High Blantyre)
- Thomas Burden 1932 - 1941 (afterwards station master at Oban)
- William Reid from 1941 (formerly station master at Ballachulish)
- John Marchbank 1949 - 1951 (afterwards station master at Buckie)
- A. Shields from 1951 (formerly station master at Denny)

== Signalling ==
The enlarged layout of 1882 was controlled from two signal boxes that opened on 1 August of that year. Both boxes stood on the north side of the line. The East box had 45 levers, while the West box had 27. Both signal boxes closed on 30 October 1965.

== Callander & Oban Junction ==
Callander & Oban Junction was situated 3/4 mile (1.2 km) east of Callander station. This location marked the beginning of the Callander and Oban Railway, where it diverged from the older Dunblane, Doune and Callander Railway.

Callander & Oban Junction signal box opened on 1 June 1870. The box was replaced on 2 November 1902 when the line was doubled to Callander station. The replacement box had 27 levers.

On 10 April 1938, the double track line between Callander station and C&O Junction was converted to two single lines. One line became the main single line, and the other was retained as a siding for access to the goods yard. All connections between the two lines at C&O Junction were severed and the signal box there was closed.

All the mileposts on the C&OR were measured from Callander & Oban Junction, including the branch line to Ballachulish and the surviving section of the line, between Crianlarich and Oban.

Preceding station	Historical railways	Following station
Doune	Dunblane, Doune and Callander Railway; Caledonian Railway	Line continues with C&OR
Line continues with DD&CR	Callander and Oban Railway; Operated by Caledonian Railway	Strathyre

== Sources ==
- Butt, R. V. J. (October 1995). The Directory of Railway Stations: details every public and private passenger station, halt, platform and stopping place, past and present (1st ed.). Sparkford: Patrick Stephens Ltd. ISBN 978-1-85260-508-7. OCLC 60251199. OL 11956311M.
- Jowett, Alan (March 1989). Jowett's Railway Atlas of Great Britain and Ireland: From Pre-Grouping to the Present Day (1st ed.). Sparkford: Patrick Stephens Ltd. ISBN 978-1-85260-086-0. OCLC 22311137.
