= Dalmally =

Village in Argyll and Bute, Scotland

Coordinates: 56.404167°N 4.974167°W

Dalmally: Scottish Gaelic: Clachan an Dìseirt, Dail Mhàilidh; Scots: Dulmally
- Location within Argyll and Bute
- OS grid reference: NN165275
- Council area: Argyll and Bute
- Lieutenancy area: Argyll and Bute
- Country: Scotland
- Sovereign state: United Kingdom
- Post town: Dalmally
- Postcode district: PA33
- Dialling code: 01838
- Police: Scotland
- Fire: Scottish
- Ambulance: Scottish
- UK Parliament: Argyll, Bute and South Lochaber
- Scottish Parliament: Argyll and Bute

Dalmally (Scottish Gaelic: Clachan an Dìseirt or Dail Mhàilidh) is a village in Argyll and Bute, Scotland. It is near the A85 road and is served by Dalmally railway station.

Former Labour Party leader John Smith was born in Dalmally in 1938. The village is the location of the Craig Lodge Community Family House of Prayer, a Roman Catholic retreat house. The charity Scottish International Relief, also known as Mary's Meals, is based in Dalmally. Glenorchy Camanachd, a shinty team, play their home games in the village at Mart Park.

== Historic buildings ==
Glenorchy Parish Church stands on an island site between the rivers Orchy and Orchy Bheag near the village. The category A listed building, constructed 1810–1811 on the site of at least two earlier churches, is a rare example of an octagonal plan with adjoining tower. The little-altered, white-harled (roughcast) church has been restored to its original appearance in recent years. The site is probably early Christian in origin, and is associated with Saint Conan. The large churchyard contains examples of medieval grave-slabs in the 'West Highland' style, which may have originally covered the graves of early chiefs of the Clan MacGregor and their relatives. They show warriors in contemporary armour, interlace and other motifs.

While there are a few more modern houses, most of the residents' homes are stone cottages. One of the oldest buildings in Dalmally is the house above the station square. It was once rundown and old but has now been restored.

Kilchurn Castle, dating from the 15th century and now maintained by Historic Scotland, stands on a peninsula (formerly an island) in Loch Awe, two miles (three kilometres) west of the village, and is open to the public in summer.

There is a monument to honour Scottish Gaelic poet Duncan Ban MacIntyre in the hills near Dalmally, overlooking Loch Awe. The monument was built following a public subscription in 1859 and was designed by John Thomas Rochead.

== History ==
Dalmally Bridge over the River Orchy was built by Ludovic Picard, an architect who worked for Lord Breadalbane. In 1780–81 he built various edifices at the western end of the Breadalbane Estates: Dalmally Bridge, the Bridge of Awe, which was swept away in 1992, Dalmally Inn, a renovated church, and several other houses in the area. Dalmally Bridge was built to make movements of cattle and troops easier: it was on the military road between Tyndrum and Oban. Since 1780, Dalmally Bridge has been strengthened and repaired. It withstands the force of the river in spate, and is a favourite spot from which to look for trout and salmon.

There are four castles on Loch Awe: from north to south, Kilchurn (the best-known), Fraoch Eilean, Innisconnel, and Fincharn. There may also have been a castle near where Castle Farm now stands. There was also a castle at Achallader, at the head of Glen Orchy. The castles on Loch Awe were once served by boats, probably galleys - the island near Innisconnel is Innis-Sea-Rhamach, the island of the six-oared galleys. Kilchurn was built, probably in 1437, by Sir Colin Campbell, the First Laird of Glenurquhay. Fraoch Eilean is a 13th-century hall house with a defensive wall, granted to Gillechrist MacNachdan by Alexander III in 1267. Innisconnel was built by the Campbells of Argyll, then taken by the MacDougalls, and finally granted again to the Campbells by Robert the Bruce, whom they had helped in his battles. Fincharn Castle is probably 13th century. According to legend, soon after it was built it was burned down in a quarrel between rival families, and has never been inhabited since. Only Kilchurn is easily accessible. Fincharn requires permission from the farm, while Fraoch Eilean and Innisconnel need boats.
