= North Connel railway station =

Disused railway station in Scotland

North Connel
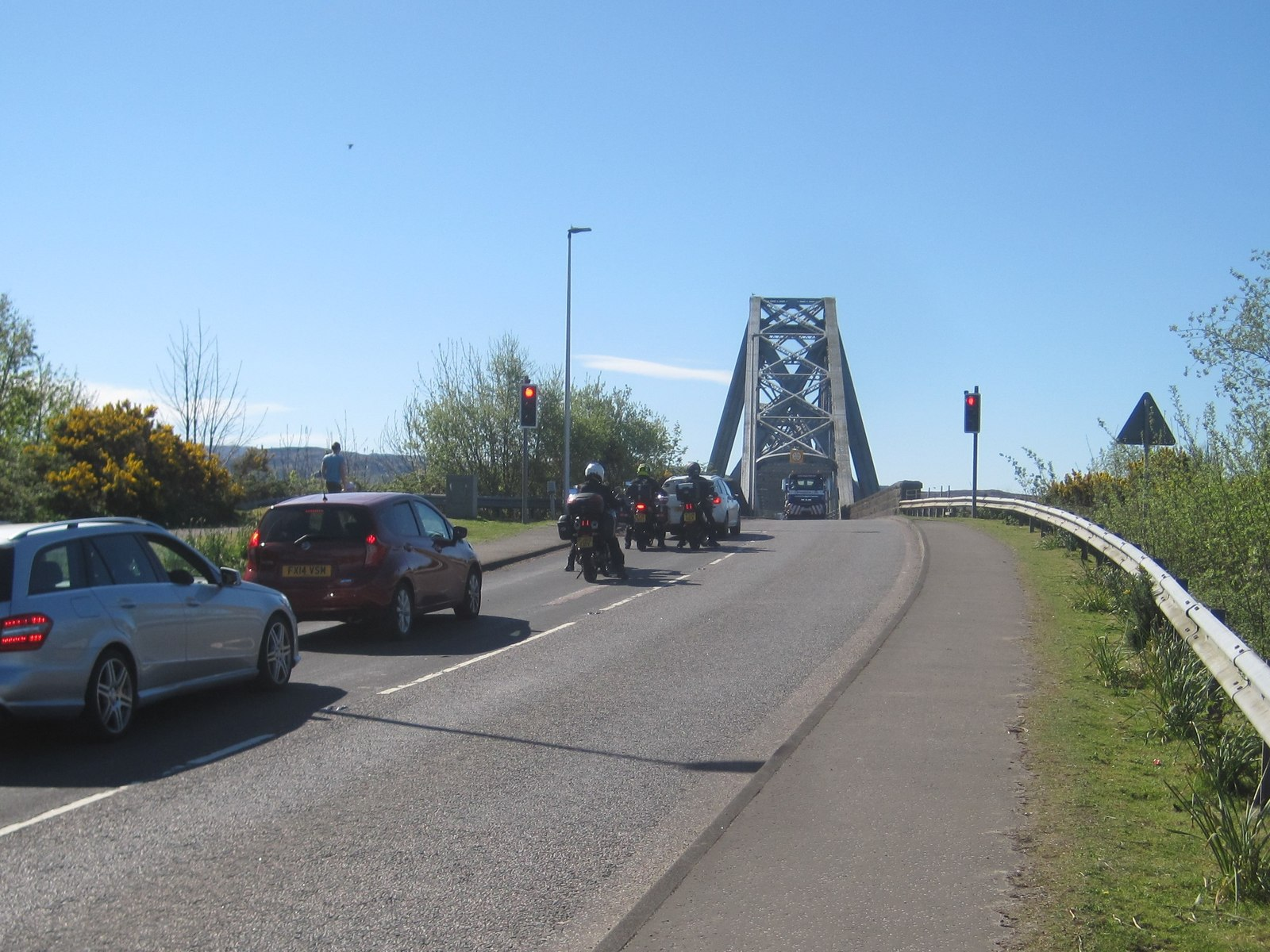
- The site of the station in 2017

General information
- Location: North Connel, Argyll and Bute; Scotland
- Coordinates: 56.4584°N 5.3924°W
- Line: Ballachulish branch line
- Platforms: 1

Other information
- Status: Disused

History
- Original company: Callander and Oban Railway
- Pre-grouping: Callander and Oban Railway operated by Caledonian Railway

Key dates
- 7 March 1904: Opened
- 25 May 1953: Closed
- 24 August 1953: Re-opened
- 28 March 1966: Closed
Location

North Connel was a railway station located in North Connel, Argyll and Bute, on the north shore of Loch Etive. Its location was at the north end of Connel Bridge. It was on the Ballachulish branch line that linked Connel Ferry, on the main line of the Callander and Oban Railway, with Ballachulish.

== History ==
Although the Ballachulish Branch of the Callander and Oban Railway had opened in August 1903, this station was not opened until 7 March 1904. It comprised a single platform on the east side of the line.

The station closed in 1966 when the Ballachulish Branch was closed. The site of the station has been obliterated by the A828 trunk road having been realigned over the route of the former trackbed in 1990.

Preceding station	Historical railways	Following station
Connel Ferry; Line closed	Callander and Oban Railway; Ballachulish Branch; Caledonian Railway	Benderloch; Line and station closed

== Sources ==
- Butt, R. V. J. (October 1995). The Directory of Railway Stations: details every public and private passenger station, halt, platform and stopping place, past and present (1st ed.). Sparkford: Patrick Stephens Ltd. ISBN 978-1-85260-508-7. OCLC 60251199. OL 11956311M.
- Fryer, Charles (1989). The Callander and Oban Railway. Oxford: Oakwood Press. ISBN 0-8536-1377-X. OCLC 21870958.
- Jowett, Alan (March 1989). Jowett's Railway Atlas of Great Britain and Ireland: From Pre-Grouping to the Present Day (1st ed.). Sparkford: Patrick Stephens Ltd. ISBN 978-1-85260-086-0. OCLC 22311137.
