= Kentallen railway station =

Railway station in Loch Linnhe in Highland, Scotland

Kentallen
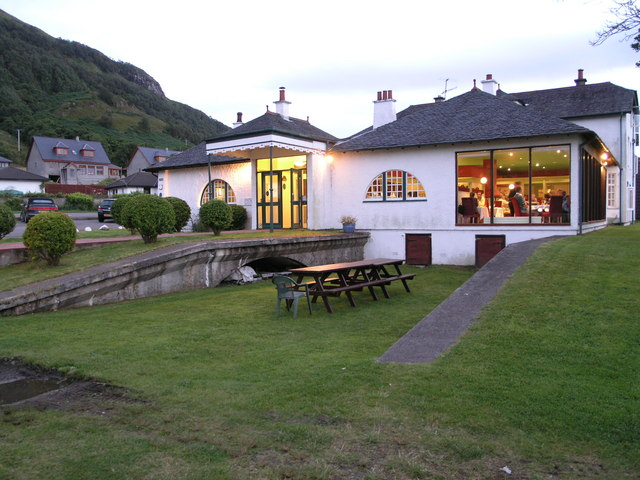
- Hotel and restaurant on the site of Kentallen station, in 2005

General information
- Location: Highland; Scotland
- Coordinates: 56.6747°N 5.2439°W
- Grid reference: NN013583
- Line: Ballachulish branch line
- Platforms: 2

Other information
- Status: Disused

History
- Original company: Callander and Oban Railway
- Pre-grouping: Callander and Oban Railway operated by Caledonian Railway
- Post-grouping: LMS

Key dates
- 24 August 1903: Opened
- 25 May 1953: Closed
- 24 August 1953: Re-opened
- 28 March 1966: Closed
Location

Kentallen was a railway station at the head of Kentallen Bay, which is on the southern shore of Loch Linnhe in the Highland council area of Scotland. It was on the Ballachulish branch line that linked Connel Ferry, on the main line of the Callander and Oban Railway, with Ballachulish.

== History ==
This station opened on 24 August 1903. It was laid out with two platforms, one on either side of a crossing loop. There were sidings on the east side of the line.

The station was temporarily closed from 25 May to 24 August 1953 when flooding washed away a bridge. It was then closed by the British Railways Board in 1966, when the Ballachulish Branch of the Callander and Oban Railway was closed.

The station had been the location of an LMS caravan in 1935 and then two caravans from 1936 to 1939. A camping coach was also positioned here by the Scottish Region from 1953 to 1965.

Preceding station	Historical railways	Following station
Duror; Line and station closed	Callander and Oban Railway; Ballachulish Branch; Caledonian Railway	Ballachulish Ferry; Line and station closed

== Present day ==
Following closure, the station building was converted into a hotel and restaurant, now the Holly Tree Hotel. The building, designed in the Glasgow Style by James Miller or Robert Wemyss with Formans & McCall as engineers, retains many original features; the signal box was replaced by a restaurant and the platform was incorporated as an internal corridor. Holiday lodges have been built over the infilled trackbed at the southern end of the former platforms.

== Signalling ==
Throughout its existence, the Ballachulish Branch was worked by the electric token system. Kentallen signal box was located on the Up platform, on the east side of the railway. It had 24 levers.
