= Barcaldine railway station =

Disused railway station in Scotland

Barcaldine

General information
- Location: Barcaldine, Argyll and Bute; Scotland
- Coordinates: 56.529°N 5.313°W
- Line: Ballachulish branch line
- Platforms: 1

Other information
- Status: Disused

History
- Original company: Callander and Oban Railway
- Pre-grouping: Callander and Oban Railway operated by Caledonian Railway
- Post-grouping: LMS

Key dates
- July 1914: Opened
- 25 May 1953: Closed
- 24 August 1953: Re-opened
- 28 March 1966: Closed
Location

Barcaldine was a railway station located in Barcaldine, Argyll and Bute, near the southern shore of Loch Creran. It was on the Ballachulish branch line that linked Connel Ferry, on the main line of the Callander and Oban Railway, with Ballachulish.

== History ==
The station opened to passengers in 1914. It comprised a single platform on the east side of the line. A siding was installed at the same time, to the south of the platform. In 1933 a Howe truss was built along the northern outskirts of Oban near the station to allow train access over lake areas between Loch Creran and Bercaldine. In 1970 the Howe truss was converted to pedestrian use.

The station closed in 1966, when the Ballachulish Branch of the Callander and Oban Railway was closed.

| Preceding station | Historical railways | Following station |
|---|---|---|
| Benderloch; Line and station closed | Callander and Oban Railway; Ballachulish Branch; Caledonian Railway | Creagan; Line and station closed |
