= Appin railway station =

Railway station in Argyll and Bute, Scotland

Appin
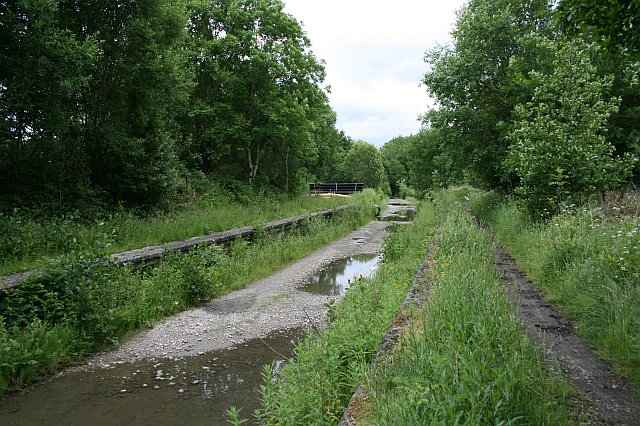
- Remains of Appin station

General information
- Location: Portnacroish, Argyll and Bute; Scotland
- Coordinates: 56.5713°N 5.3800°W
- Line: Ballachulish branch line
- Platforms: 2

Other information
- Status: Disused

History
- Original company: Callander and Oban Railway
- Pre-grouping: Callander and Oban Railway operated by Caledonian Railway
- Post-grouping: LMS

Key dates
- 24 August 1903: Opened
- 25 May 1953: Closed
- 24 August 1953: Re-opened
- 28 March 1966: Closed
Location

Appin was a railway station in Scotland, close to the Sound of Shuna on the east shore of Loch Laiche – an arm of Loch Linnhe, Portnacroish, Appin in Argyll and Bute. It was on the Ballachulish branch line that linked Connel Ferry, on the main line of the Callander and Oban Railway, with Ballachulish.

== History ==
This station opened on 24 August 1903. It was laid out with two platforms, one on either side of a crossing loop. There were sidings on both sides of the line.

Opened by the Callander and Oban Railway, it joined the London, Midland and Scottish Railway during the Grouping of 1923. Passing on to the Scottish Region of British Railways on nationalisation in 1948.

The station was temporarily closed from 25 May to 24 August 1953 when flooding washed away a bridge. It was then closed by the British Railways Board in 1966, when the Ballachulish Branch of the Callander and Oban Railway was closed.

The station had been the location of two LMS caravans from 1935 to 1939. A camping coach was also positioned here by the Scottish Region from 1952 to 1965.

Preceding station	Historical railways	Following station
Creagan; Line and station closed	Callander and Oban Railway; Ballachulish Branch; Caledonian Railway	Duror; Line and station closed

== Signalling ==
Throughout its existence, signalling on the Ballachulish Branch used the electric token system. Appin signal box was located on the Down platform, on the west side of the railway. It had 24 levers.
