= Duror railway station =

Railway station in Highland, Scotland

Duror
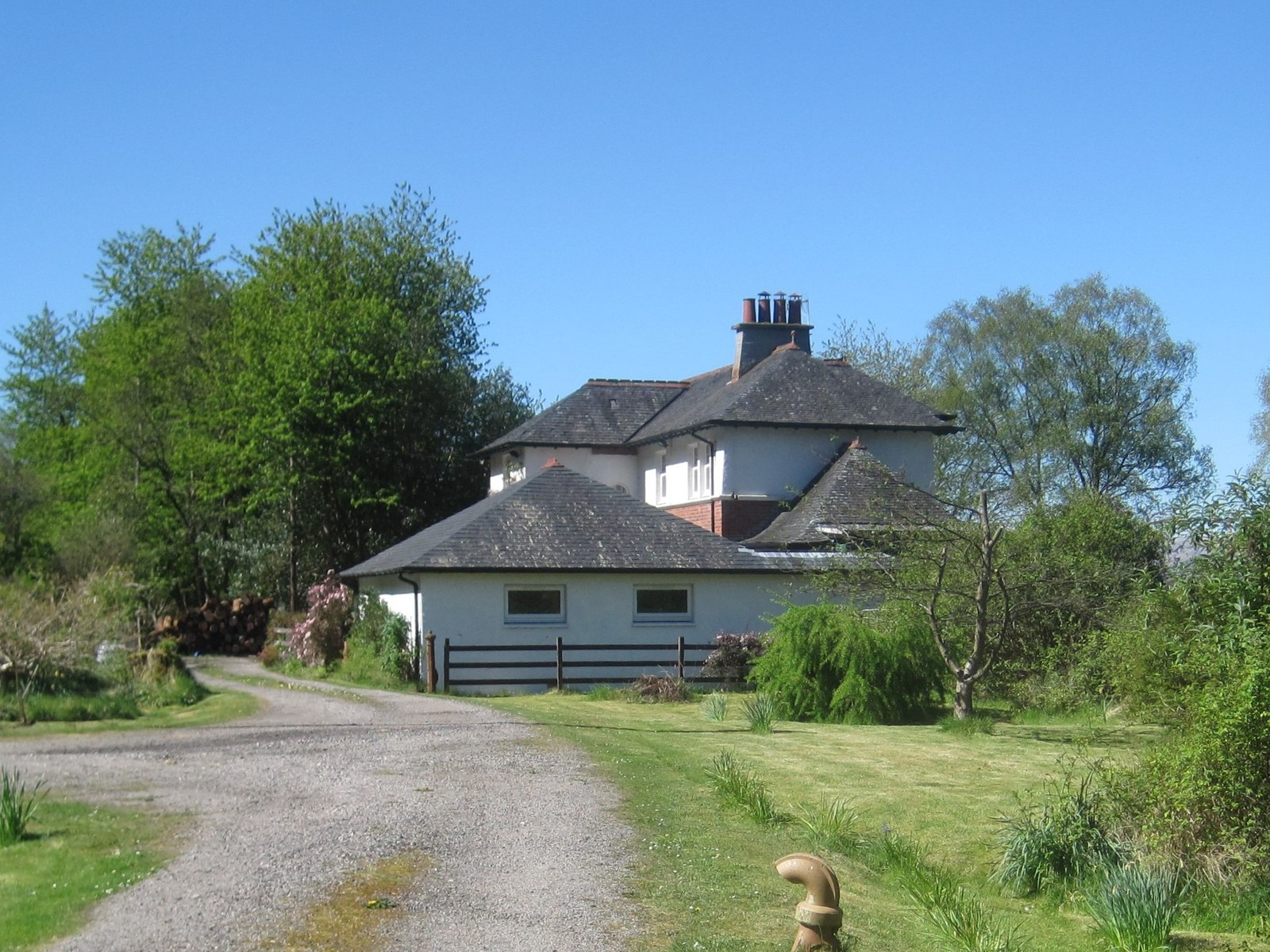
- The site of the station in 2017

General information
- Location: Duror, Highland; Scotland
- Coordinates: 56.6355°N 5.3011°W
- Line: Ballachulish branch line
- Platforms: 2 (latterly 1)

Other information
- Status: Disused

History
- Original company: Callander and Oban Railway
- Pre-grouping: Callander and Oban Railway operated by Caledonian Railway
- Post-grouping: LMS

Key dates
- 24 August 1903: Opened
- 25 May 1953: Closed
- 24 August 1953: Re-opened
- 28 March 1966: Closed
Location

Duror was a railway station on Cuil Bay on the east shore of Loch Linnhe at Keil, south of Duror, in Highland region. It was on the Ballachulish branch line that linked Connel Ferry, on the main line of the Callander and Oban Railway, with Ballachulish.

== History ==
This station opened on 24 August 1903. It was laid out with two platforms, one on either side of a crossing loop. There was a siding to the north of the station, on the east side of the line.

One platform was taken out of use on 8 April 1927 along with the crossing loop.

The station closed in 1966, when the Ballachulish Branch of the Callander and Oban Railway was closed.

== Signalling ==
Throughout its existence, the Ballachulish Branch was worked by the electric token system. Duror signal box, which had 18 levers, was located on the Up platform, on the east side of the railway. The signal box and crossing loop were taken out of use on 8 April 1927.

Preceding station	Historical railways	Following station
Appin; Line and station closed	Callander and Oban Railway; Ballachulish Branch; Caledonian Railway	Kentallen; Line and station closed
