= Benderloch railway station =

Railway station in Argyll and Bute, Scotland

Benderloch
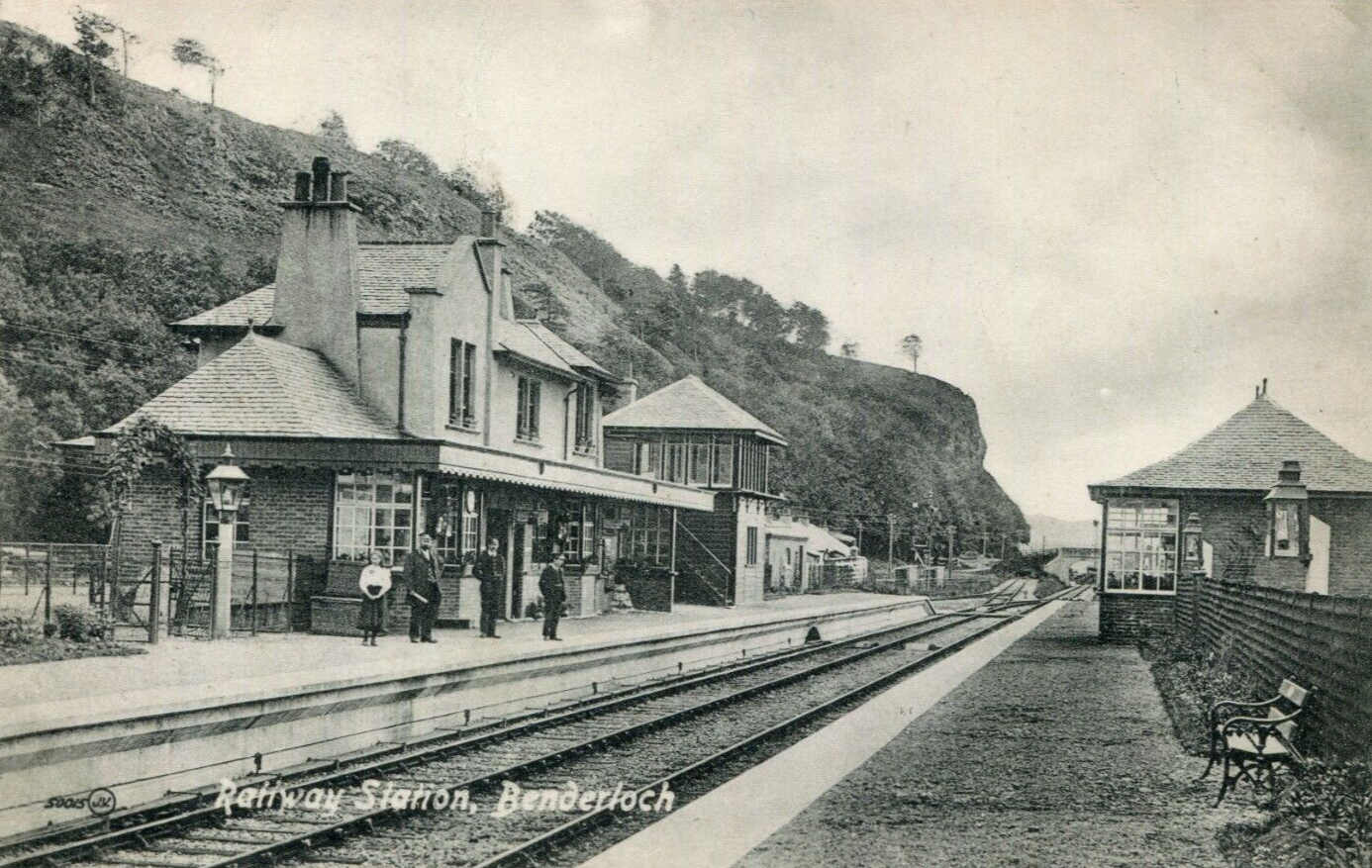
- Benderloch railway station in 1905

General information
- Location: Benderloch, Argyll and Bute; Scotland
- Coordinates: 56.4891°N 5.4055°W
- Line: Ballachulish branch line
- Platforms: 2

Other information
- Status: Disused

History
- Original company: Callander and Oban Railway
- Pre-grouping: Callander and Oban Railway operated by Caledonian Railway

Key dates
- 24 August 1903: Opened
- 25 May 1953: Closed
- 24 August 1953: Reopened
- 28 March 1966: Closed
Location

Benderloch was a railway station located in Benderloch, Argyll and Bute, on the north east shore of Ardmucknish Bay. It was on the Ballachulish branch line that linked Connel Ferry, on the main line of the Callander and Oban Railway, with Ballachulish.

== History ==
This station opened on 24 August 1903. It was laid out with two platforms, one on either side of a crossing loop. There were sidings on both sides of the line.

Opened by the Callander and Oban Railway, it joined the London, Midland and Scottish Railway during the Grouping of 1923 and became part of the Scottish Region of British Railways on nationalisation in 1948.

The station was temporarily closed from 25 May to 24 August 1953 when flooding washed away a bridge. It was then closed by the British Railways Board in 1966, when the Ballachulish Branch of the Callander and Oban Railway was closed.

The station was host to a LMS caravan in 1935 and 1936 followed by two caravans from 1937 to 1939. A camping coach was also positioned here by the Scottish Region from 1956 to 1959 followed by two coaches from 1960 to 1965.

Preceding station	Historical railways	Following station
North Connel; Line and station closed	Callander and Oban Railway; Ballachulish Branch; Caledonian Railway	Barcaldine; Line and station closed

== Signalling ==
Throughout its existence, the Ballachulish Branch was worked by the electric token system. Benderloch signal box was located on the Up platform, on the east side of the railway. It had 24 levers.
