= Ballachulish Ferry railway station =

Railway station in Highland, Scotland

Ballachulish Ferry
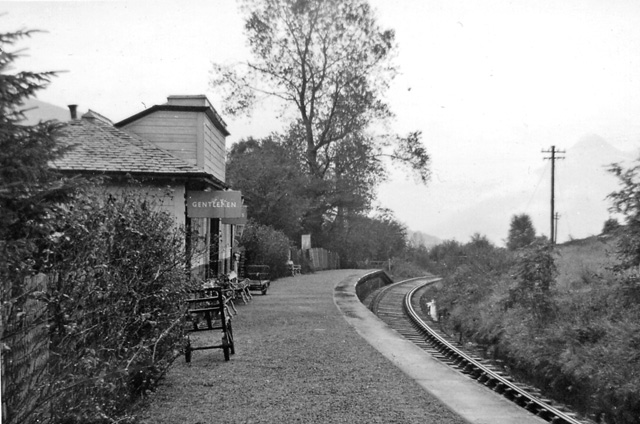
- Eastward view towards Ballachulish (Glencoe) in 1961

General information
- Location: South Ballachulish, Highland; Scotland
- Coordinates: 56.6854°N 5.1806°W
- Line: Ballachulish branch line
- Platforms: 1

Other information
- Status: Disused

History
- Original company: Callander and Oban Railway
- Pre-grouping: Callander and Oban Railway operated by Caledonian Railway

Key dates
- 24 August 1903: Opened
- 25 May 1953: Closed
- 24 August 1953: Re-opened
- 28 March 1966: Closed
Location

Ballachulish Ferry was a railway station on the south shore at the narrows of Loch Leven at South Ballachulish in Highland region, Scotland. It was on the Ballachulish branch line that linked Connel Ferry, on the main line of the Callander and Oban Railway, with Ballachulish.

== History ==
Ballachulish Ferry station opened on 24 August 1903. It had one platform, on the north side of the line.

The station was opened by the Callander and Oban Railway, which was absorbed into the London, Midland and Scottish Railway during the Grouping of 1923. The station then passed to the Scottish Region of British Railways on nationalisation in 1948 and was closed by the British Railways Board in 1966, when the Ballachulish Branch closed.

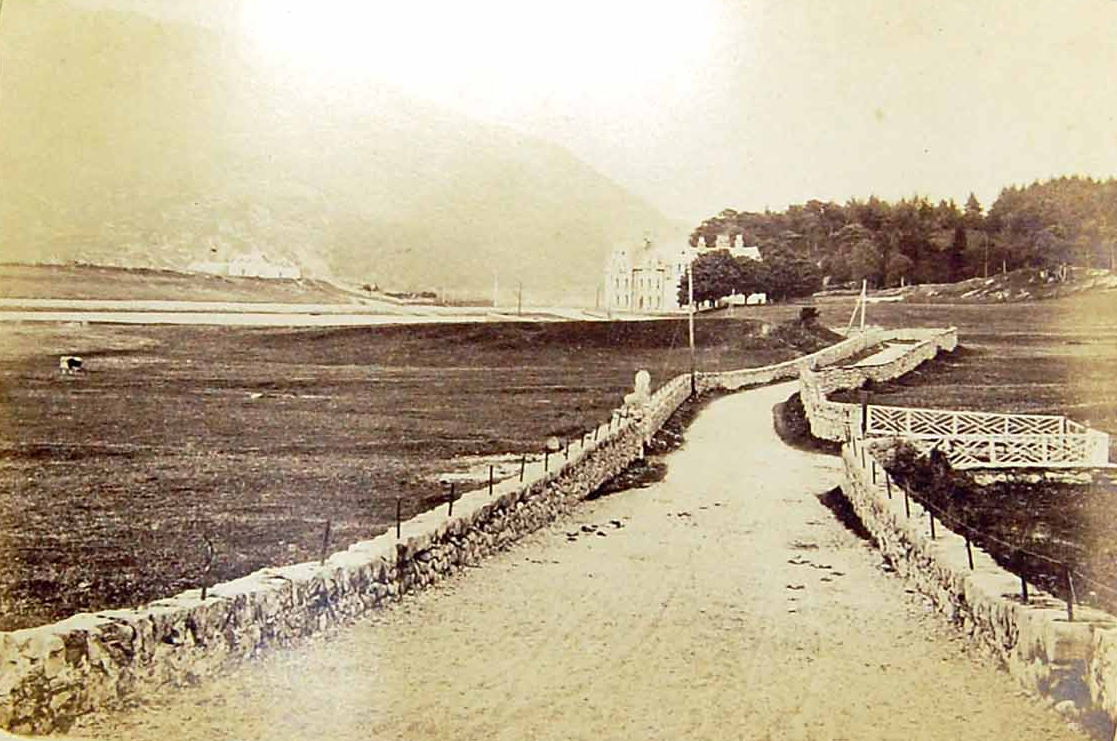
Ballachulish Ferry Hotels, photograph by James Valentine, ca. 1870

Preceding station	Historical railways	Following station
Kentallen; Line and station closed	Callander and Oban Railway; Ballachulish Branch; Caledonian Railway	Ballachulish; Line and station closed
