= Achnacloich =

Achnacloich is the name of three places in Scotland:

- Achnacloich, Argyll and Bute, on the southern shore of Loch Etive

- The nearby Ach-na-Cloich railway station

- Achnacloich, Isle of Skye, on the Sleat peninsula, Isle of Skye
- Achnacloich, Ross and Cromarty, a loch (lake) in Ardross, Highland
