= Creagan railway station =

Railway station in Argyll and Bute, Scotland

Creagan
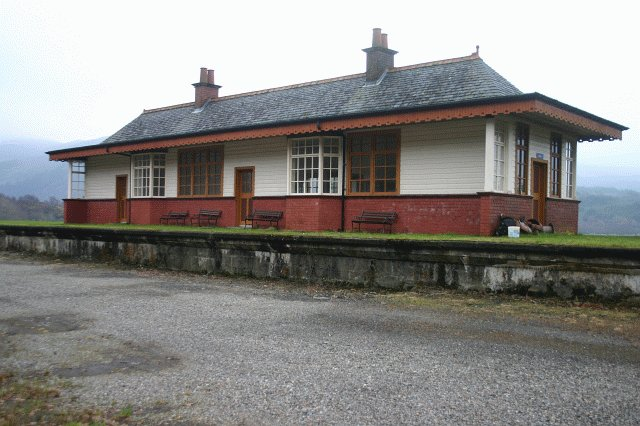

General information
- Location: Loch Creran, Argyll and Bute; Scotland
- Coordinates: 56.5520°N 5.3053°W
- Line: Ballachulish branch line
- Platforms: 2 (latterly 1)

Other information
- Status: Disused

History
- Original company: Callander and Oban Railway
- Pre-grouping: Callander and Oban Railway operated by Caledonian Railway
- Post-grouping: LMS

Key dates
- 24 August 1903: Opened
- 25 May 1953: Closed
- 24 August 1953: Re-opened
- 28 March 1966: Closed
Location

Creagan was a railway station located on the north shore of Loch Creran 1/4 mile (400 m) north of the Creagan Inn in Argyll and Bute. It was on the Ballachulish branch line that linked Connel Ferry, on the main line of the Callander and Oban Railway, with Ballachulish.

== History ==
The station was opened on 24 August 1903 when the Callander and Oban Railway opened its branch to Ballachulish.

Creagan was the only station on the Ballachulish branch that had an island platform. There was a siding to the east of the platform, on the north side of the railway.

One platform was taken out of use on 1 April 1927.

The station was host to a LMS caravan in 1935 and 1936 followed by two caravans from 1937 to 1939. A camping coach was also positioned here by the Scottish Region from 1961 to 1964.

This station closed on 28 March 1966, when the Ballachulish Branch of the Callander and Oban Railway was closed.

== Signalling ==
Throughout its existence, the Ballachulish Branch was worked by the electric token system. Creagan signal box, which had 21 levers, was situated on the island platform.

The signal box and crossing loop were taken out of use on 1 April 1927.

| Preceding station | Historical railways | Following station |
|---|---|---|
| Barcaldine; Line and station closed | Callander and Oban Railway; Ballachulish Branch; Caledonian Railway | Appin; Line and station closed |
