= North Connel =

Settlement in Scotland

Coordinates: 56°27′32″N 5°23′46″W

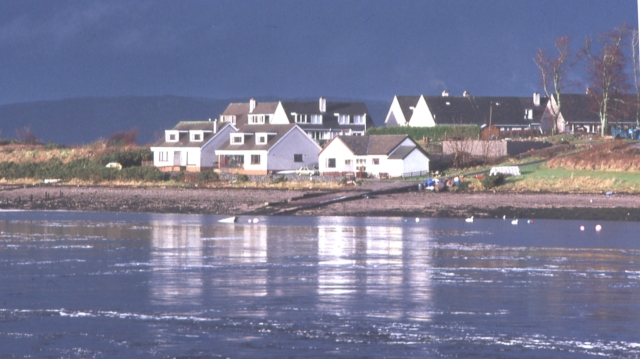
North Connel from the south shore

North Connel is a hamlet on the north side of Loch Etive in Argyll and Bute, Scotland.

Connel Bridge connects the community to Connel on the south shore of the loch, approximately 7 kilometres from Oban. While the bridge belonged to British Rail, a toll was charged to cross and it closed at night. Once sparsely populated, the number of houses in North Connel quickly increased after the bridge was handed over to Argyllshire County Council in the late 1960s.

Oban Airport or Connel Airfield is nearby.
