= Ach-na-Cloich railway station =

Disused railway station in Scotland

Ach-na-Cloich
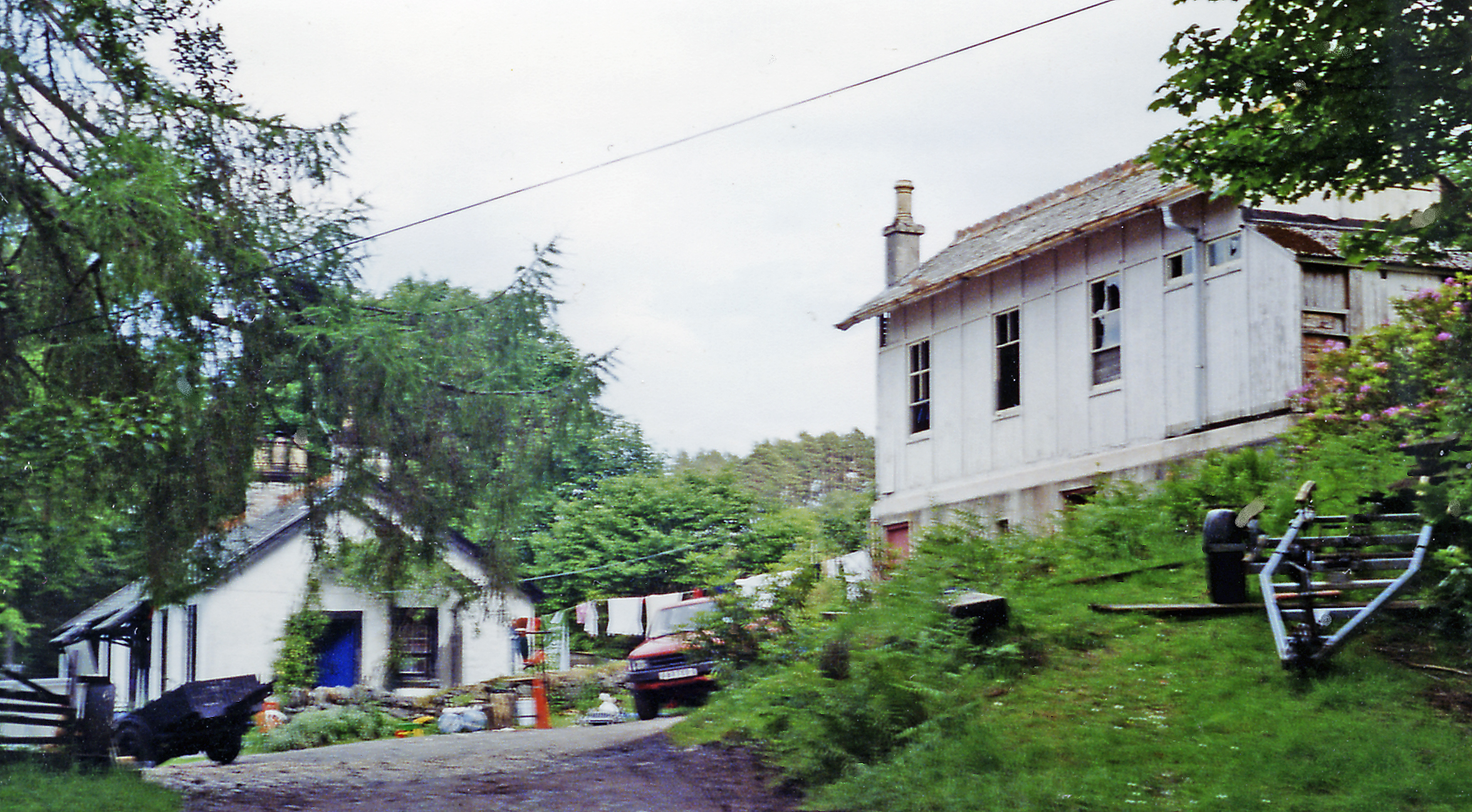
- Location of the former station (1994)

General information
- Location: Achnacloich, Argyll and Bute; Scotland
- Coordinates: 56.4534°N 5.3102°W
- Grid reference: NM961339
- Platforms: 1

Other information
- Status: Disused

History
- Original company: Callander and Oban Railway
- Pre-grouping: Callander and Oban Railway operated by Caledonian Railway
- Post-grouping: LMS

Key dates
- 1881: Station opened
- 1 January 1917: Station closed
- 1 June 1919: Station reopened
- 1 November 1965: Station closed
Location

Ach-na-Cloich is a closed railway station located on the south shore of Loch Etive, in Argyll and Bute. Its site is located on the Oban route of the scenic West Highland Line, that was part of the Callander and Oban Railway.

The local village is called Achnacloich, although the Callander and Oban Railway named the station "Ach-na-Cloich".

== History ==
Opened by the Callander and Oban Railway, it became part of the London, Midland and Scottish Railway during the Grouping of 1923. Passing to the Scottish Region of British Railways on nationalisation in 1948, it was then closed by the British Railways Board.

Preceding station	Historical railways	Following station
Taynuilt; Line and Station open	Callander and Oban Railway; Operated by Caledonian Railway	Connel Ferry; Line and Station open

== The site today ==
Trains on the Oban section of the West Highland Line pass the site of the closed station. The single platform remains in situ but the wooden station building, which survived long after closure, has now gone.
