= Creagan Bridge =

Bridge in Argyll and Bute, Scotland

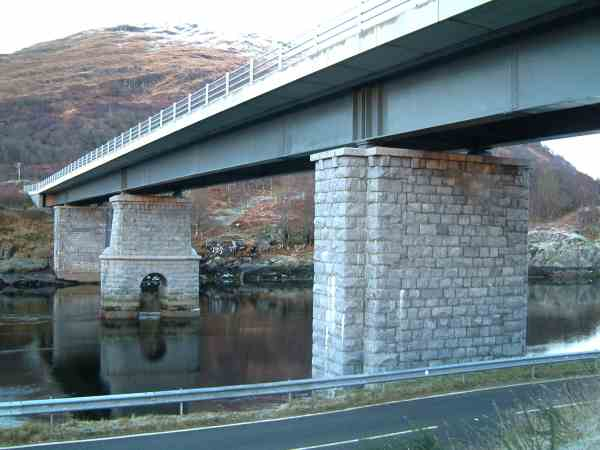
- Creagan Bridge in 2003
- Coordinates: 56.54734°N 5.29056°W
- Carries: A828
- Crosses: Loch Creran
- Locale: Argyll and Bute

Characteristics
- Design: Plate girder
- No. of spans: 4

History
- Built: 1903; 123 years ago
- Rebuilt: 1999; 27 years ago

Location
- Interactive map of Creagan Bridge

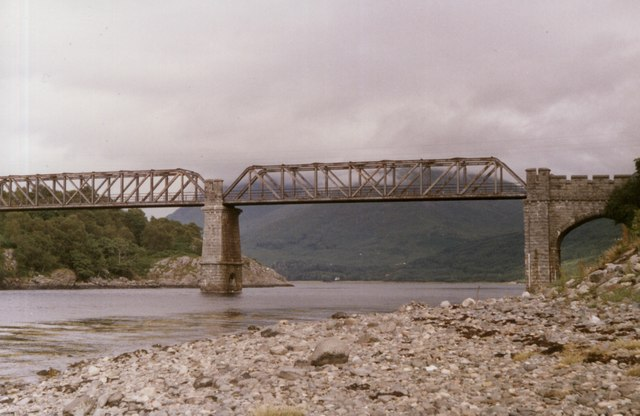
The disused bridge in 1989

Creagan Bridge is a bridge that crosses Loch Creran at Creagan in Scotland. It is a road bridge that uses the supporting columns of a former railway viaduct.

The railway viaduct was opened on 21 August 1903 by the Callander and Oban Railway. It carried the branch line to Ballachulish and was situated approximately half a mile from Creagan railway station. It closed with the line on 28 March 1966. A road bridge reusing the supporting columns of the railway viaduct was opened in 1999.

== See also ==
- List of bridges in Scotland
