= Barcaldine Castle =

Castle in Barcaldine, Scotland

- Oban, Argyll, Scotland
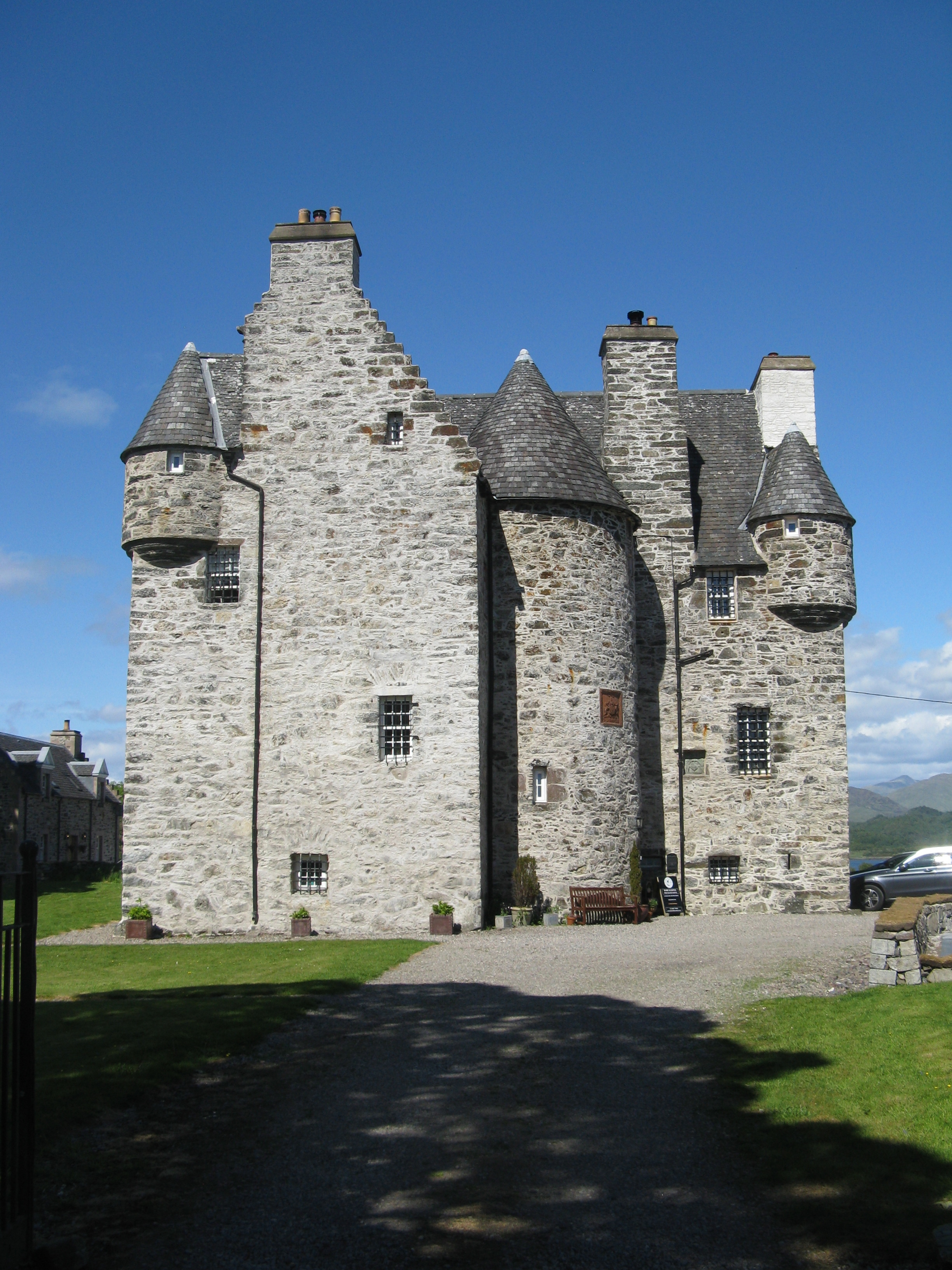
- Barcaldine Castle in 2019

Location
- Shown within Scotland
- Coordinates: 56.510356°N 5.401184°W

Site history
- Built: 1601-9; Restored 1897-1911
- Built by: Duncan Campbell

Barcaldine Castle (also called the Black Castle) is a 17th-century tower house castle located at Barcaldine 9 miles north of Oban, Scotland.

== History ==
The castle was built by Duncan Campbell of Glenorchy between 1601 and 1609. In 1692, the castle was attacked during the massacre of Glencoe.

The castle fell into disrepair in the later 19th century, when Barcaldine House became the principal residence of the family. It was restored between 1897 and 1911. It was purchased in November 2009 by David Whitehead.

== Description ==
The castle has a bottle dungeon and two hidden passageways.

The castle offers a view of the Loch Creran and the Glen Coe mountains.

The castle has been owned since November 2009 by David Whitehead.
