= Connel =

Coordinates: 56.4544°N 5.3860°W

Connel: Scottish Gaelic: A' Choingheal
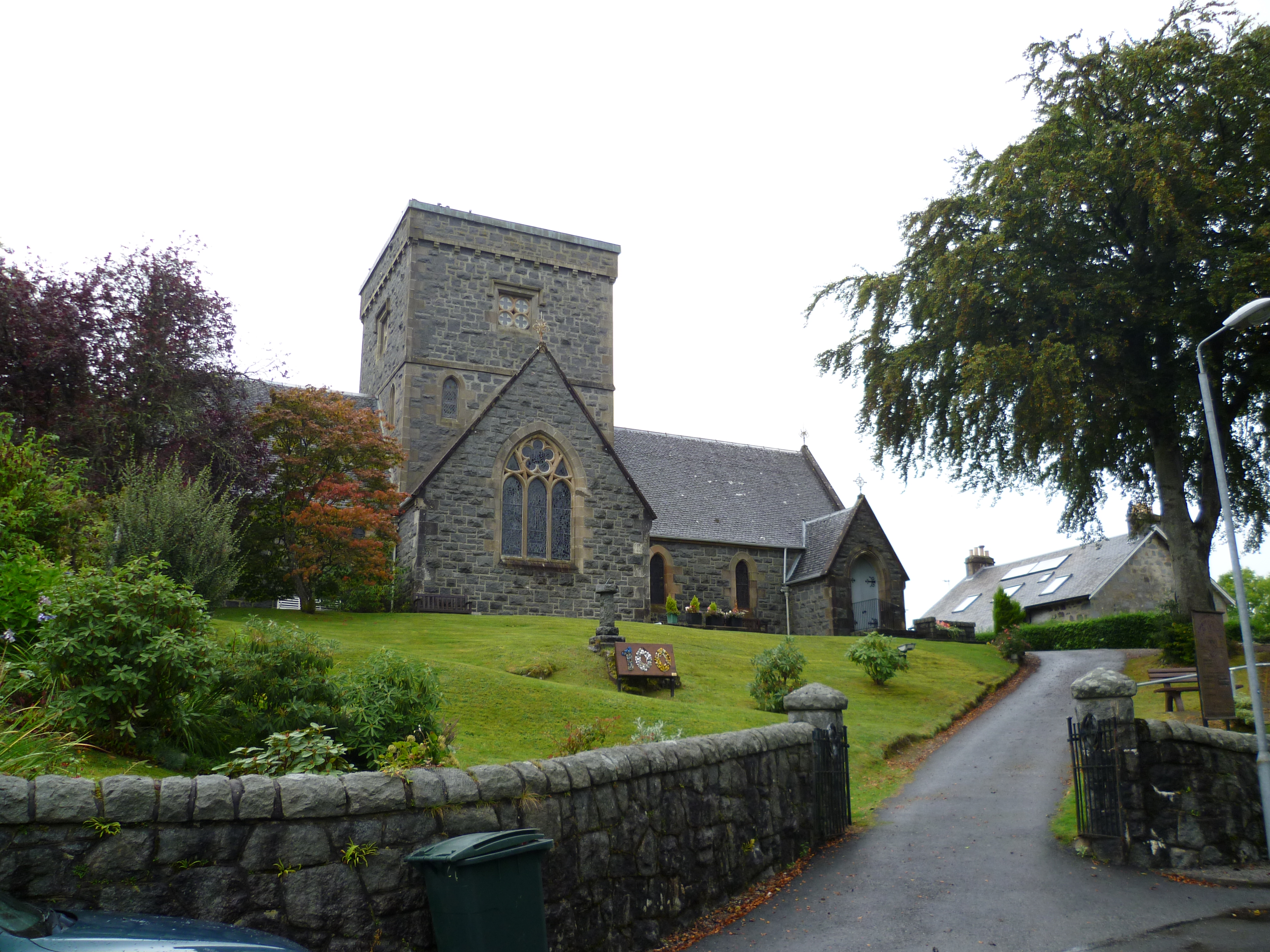
- St Oran's Church, September 2014

- Location within Argyll and Bute
- OS grid reference: NM910341
  - Edinburgh: 91 mi (146 km)
  - London: 403 mi (649 km)
- Council area: Argyll and Bute
- Lieutenancy area: Argyll and Bute
- Country: Scotland
- Sovereign state: United Kingdom
- Post town: OBAN
- Postcode district: PA37
- Police: Scotland
- Fire: Scottish
- Ambulance: Scottish
- UK Parliament: Argyll, Bute and South Lochaber
- Scottish Parliament: Argyll and Bute

Connel (Gaelic: A' Choingheal) is a village in Argyll and Bute, Scotland. It is situated on the southern shore of Loch Etive. The Lusragan Burn flows through the village and into the loch.

The most noticeable feature in the village is Connel Bridge, a large cantilever bridge that spans Loch Etive at the Falls of Lora. It was built to carry the Callander and Oban Railway's branch line to Ballachulish that opened in 1903.

== Amenities ==
There is a non-denominational primary school in the village, called Achaleven Primary School. Other buildings of note include the Falls of Lora Hotel and St. Oran's Church (Church of Scotland). The church is linked with two others. The first is in the nearby village of Dunbeg, the second is on the isle of Coll. Church services at St Oran's are held every Sunday at 10:30.

There is a village shop and post office located in the main village. There are two bus stops, one located opposite the post office and the second on the A85, just south of Connel Bridge Junction, which serves both sides of the road. Restaurants can be found at the Falls of Lora Hotel and at The Oyster Inn. There are also several B&Bs to be found throughout the village.

== Transport ==
Connel lies on the A85 trunk road that runs between Oban and Perth. The A828 Connel to Ballachulish trunk road joins the A85 at a junction towards the west end of the village. Vehicles turning onto the A828 head south then follow the road on a long left-hand curve as it climbs to Connel Bridge, which crosses over the A85. Connel is just five miles (eight kilometres) to Oban by main road. There is also a minor "back road" to Oban that runs by way of Ardchonnell and Barranrioch.

A ferry formerly transported people and vehicles across the loch to North Connel.

When the Callander and Oban Railway came to Connel in 1880, a station was opened in the village and named "Connel Ferry". The station is still open, it being situated on the West Highland Line to Oban. It is now unstaffed.

Oban Airport is nearby on the opposite side of Loch Etive.
