= Connel Bridge =

Cantilever bridge that spans Loch Etive in Scotland

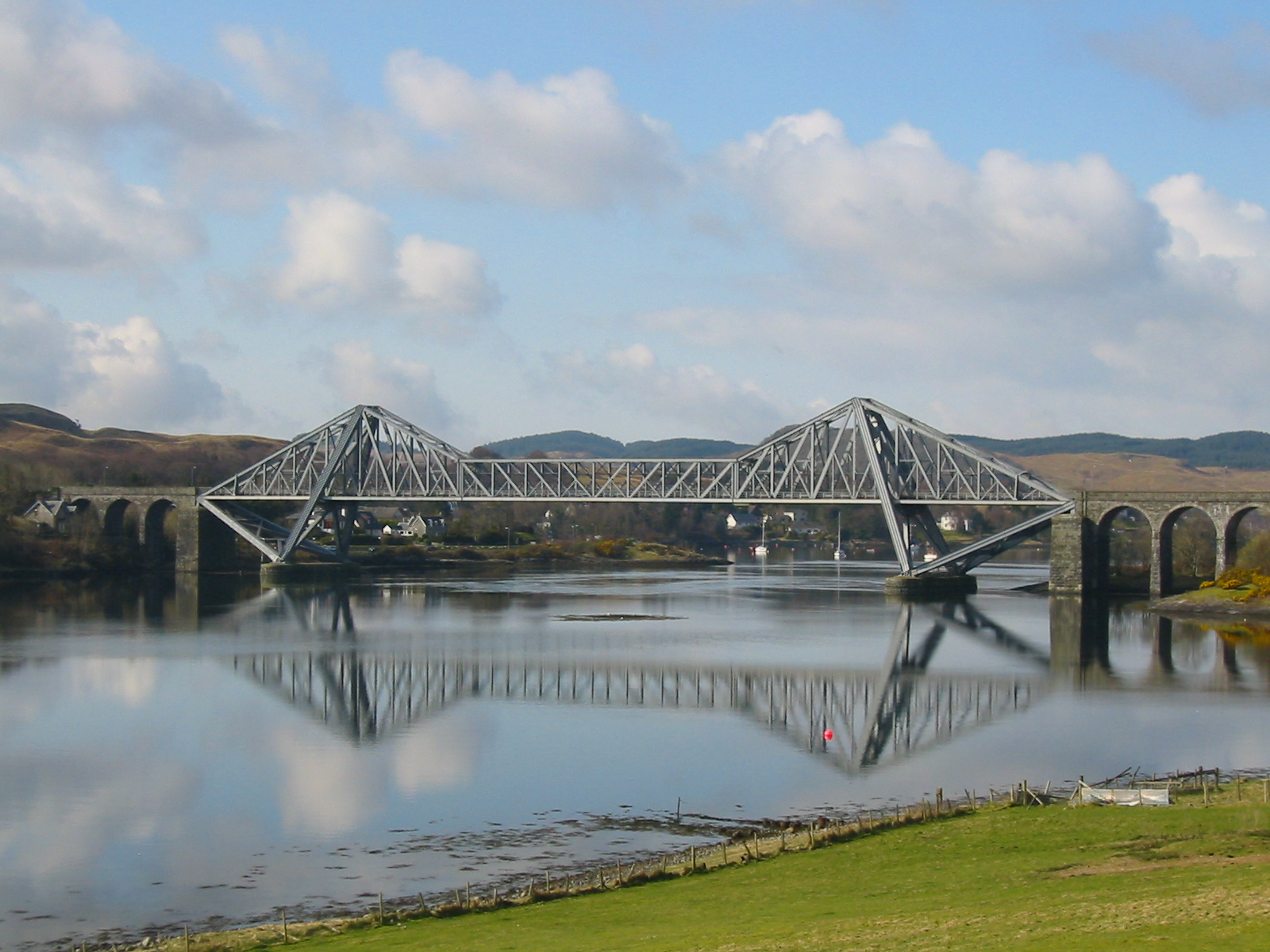
- Coordinates: 56.45619°N 5.39150°W
- OS grid reference: NM 91118 34495
- Carries: A828 road
- Crosses: Loch Etive

Characteristics
- Design: Cantilever
- Material: Steel

History
- Designer: John Wolfe Barry and others

Listed Building – Category B
- Official name: Connel Bridge Loch Etive
- Designated: 19 July 1971
- Reference no.: LB11986

Location
- Interactive map of Connel Bridge

Connel Bridge is a cantilever bridge that spans Loch Etive at Connel in Scotland. The bridge takes the A828 road across the narrowest part of the loch, at the Falls of Lora. It is a category B listed structure.

== History ==
The bridge was built by Arrol's Bridge and Roof Company to carry the Ballachulish branch line of the Callander and Oban Railway, which opened on 20 August 1903. Nearly 2,600 long tons (2,640 t; 2,910 short tons) of steel were used in its construction and it cost almost £43,000 to build. When complete it had a longer span than any other railway bridge in Britain except the Forth Bridge, built by a different firm. The Connel Bridge was constructed by a firm called Arrol, of the Germiston Iron Works, Glasgow It was engineered by John Wolfe Barry. The resident engineer responsible for the build was Edward Cruttwell.

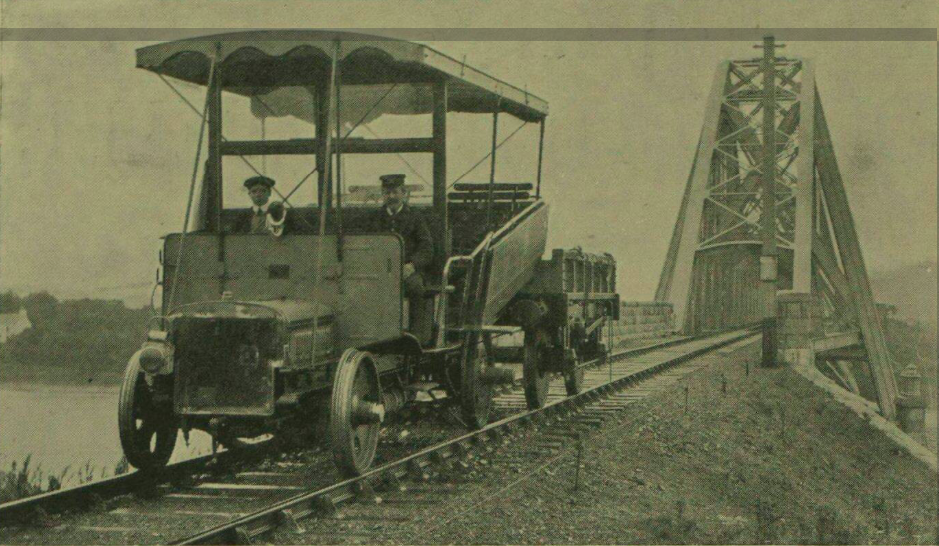
The charabanc and single rail car in 1909

Originally, the bridge carried just the railway (a single track). In 1909, however, an additional train service started running between Connel Ferry station and Benderloch on which road vehicles could be transported over the bridge. A single car was carried on a wagon hauled by a charabanc that had been adapted to run on rails at St. Rollox railway works in Glasgow. This service also called at North Connel station at the north end of the bridge.

In 1914, a roadway was added to the bridge, alongside the railway line. The road occupied the western side of the bridge, with the railway running parallel immediately to the east. Due to the close proximity of road and railway, road traffic and trains were not permitted on the bridge at the same time and the bridge was effectively operated as an extended level crossing with gates. The road crossed to the opposite side of the railway at the north end of the bridge. A toll was payable by road users.

After the branch line closed in 1966, the bridge was converted for the exclusive use of road vehicles and pedestrians, and the toll was removed. Despite the railway track having been removed, the roadway is not wide enough for two vehicles to cross each other. Traffic lights are installed at each end of the bridge to enforce one-way traffic.

== Design ==
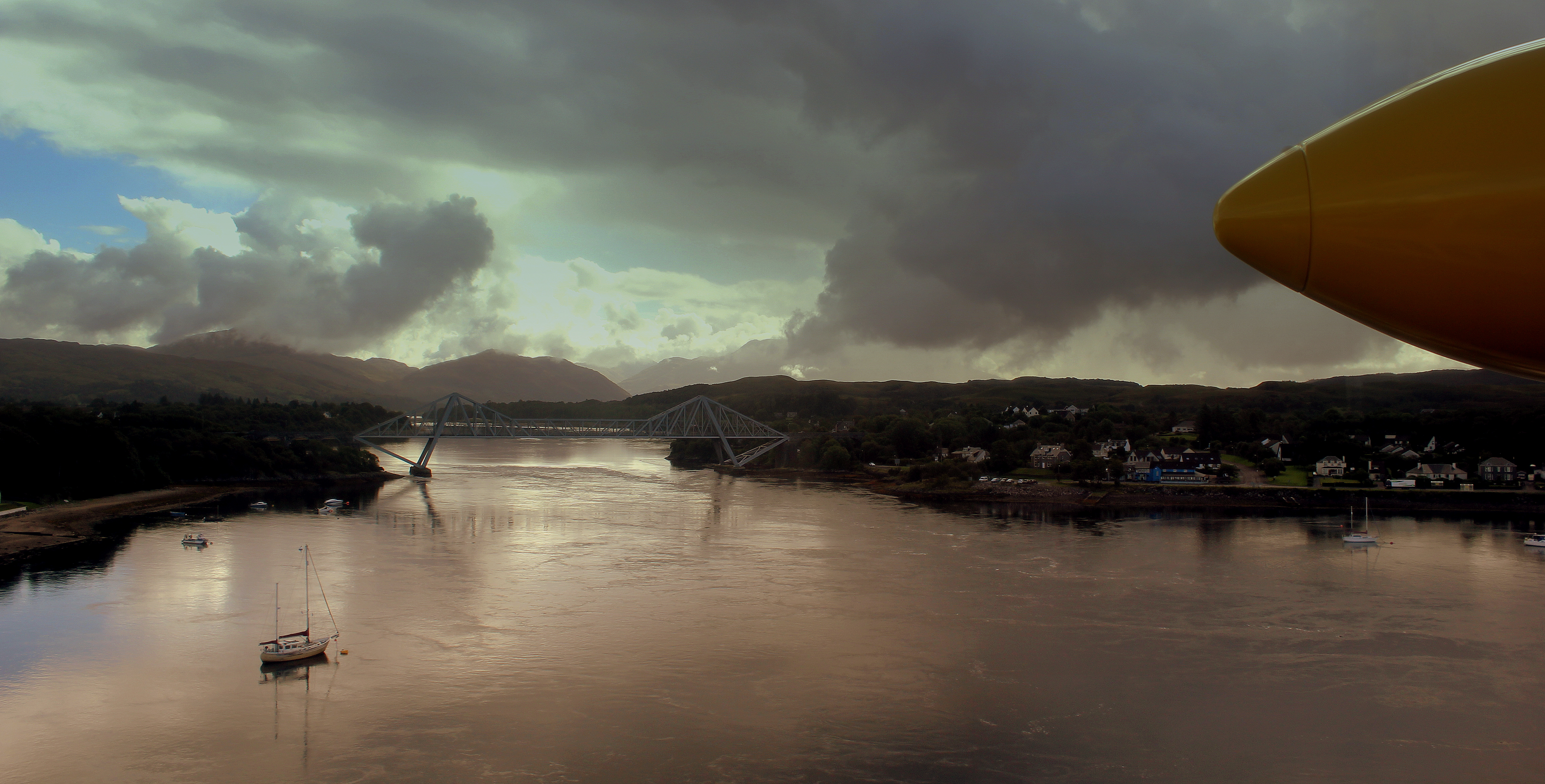
Aerial View

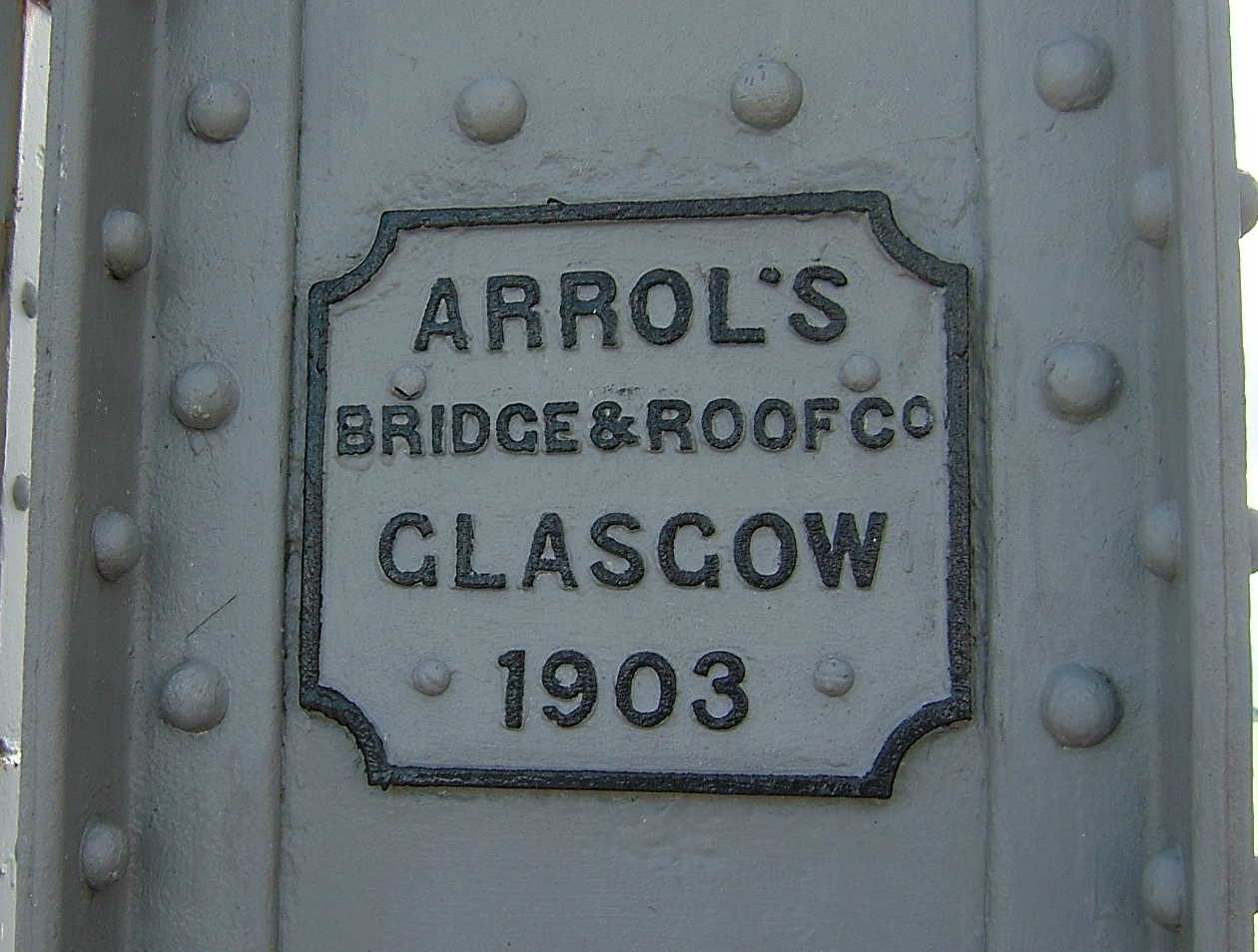
Builder's plate on Connel Bridge

Connel Bridge has a span of 524 feet (160 m) between the piers, but a clear span of 500 feet (150 m) due to the supports which project from the piers towards the centre of the bridge. The suspended span, the box-shaped section in the middle of the bridge, is 232 feet (71 m) long. The large span without supporting piers was necessitated by the strong tidal currents of the Falls of Lora, just to the east of the bridge.

The approach viaducts on each side of the bridge both comprise three masonry arches. The height limit for vehicles using the bridge is 4.2 metres (14 ft), and taller vehicles have caused damage to the bridge.

== Filming ==
Connel Bridge appears in the 1981 film Eye of the Needle, starring Donald Sutherland. In the film, Sutherland's character is seen riding a stolen motorcycle across the bridge, which he then disposes of by pushing it down the embankment at the north end of the bridge after it runs out of fuel.

== See also ==
- List of bridges in Scotland
