= Barcaldine House =

Country house hotel in Argyll and Bute, Scotland

Coordinates: 56.522°N 5.317°W

General information
- Location: Barcaldine, near Oban; Argyll and Bute, Scotland; PA37 1SG
- Renovated: 1989

References
- BarcaldineHouse.co.uk

Barcaldine House is a historic mansion in Barcaldine near Oban, Scotland, now a hotel.

== History ==
=== Campbell ownership 1709–1842 ===
The lands were originally part of the extensive estates of the Campbell of Breadalbane, who had built Barcaldine Castle in about 1594, one of six castles including Kilchurn, Edinample and Taymouth Castle. At that time the lands extended from Loch Tay continuously to the west coast of Scotland.

The house was originally built in 1709, by "Red Patrick", 4th (laird) of Barcaldine when the family abandoned the nearby Barcaldine Castle for a more comfortable home. The house became the home of his son by his first marriage, Duncan Campbell (1716–1784). Duncan's half brother (by Red Patrick's second wife) was Colin Campbell of Glenure, the Red Fox in RL Stevenson's Kidnapped, who was assassinated in the woods at Lettermore near Duror on 14 May 1752. The question of who shot the Red Fox has become known as the Appin Mystery. The body of the Red Fox rested in the Drawing Room of Barcaldine House on the way to its burial site at Ardchattan Priory.

Barcaldine House was extended by Duncan Campbell, 1st Baronet (1786–1842), the great-grandson of Red Patrick. Duncan received his baronetcy in 1831 for service in the army during the Napoleonic wars. Campbell laid out the 20-foot (6.1 m) high walled garden which is now the nearby caravan park. The garden had huge heated glasshouses with vines, peaches, pineapples, nectarines and other exotic fruits. Some trees from that time still survive. The 30,000-acre (120 km^{2}) estate was sold in 1842 to clear family debts.

=== Decline 1842–1988 ===
The estate was purchased by Donald Charles Cameron in 1842 and remained in the Cameron family until acquired by the Stewart-Rankine family in the late 19th century.

In 1925 the Forestry Commission began after their purchase of most of the estate grounds. By the 1950s the house lay derelict.

=== Revival and hotel 1980s to date ===
(The house lay derelict until 1988, not factual) The house was used by a “hippy” commune in the early 1970s and was purchased by the Richard's family around the late 1970s. The Richard's family lived there for several years renovating parts of the house where time and funds allowed. It was purchased by Mr and Mrs Brian John Reid, of Oban. Without their intervention, the historic house would almost certainly have been lost. Since about 1990 Barcaldine has been a luxury hotel and a popular wedding venue with eight en suite rooms in the main house and the wings converted to self-catering cottages.

== Location ==
Barcaldine House Hotel and Cottages are just off the A828 in the village of Barcaldine about 10 miles (16 km) north of Oban in Argyll and Bute, Scotland. This is near to Loch Creran and Loch Etive.
