= Barcaldine, Argyll =

Village in Argyll and Bute, Scotland

Coordinates: 56°31′22″N 5°18′56″W

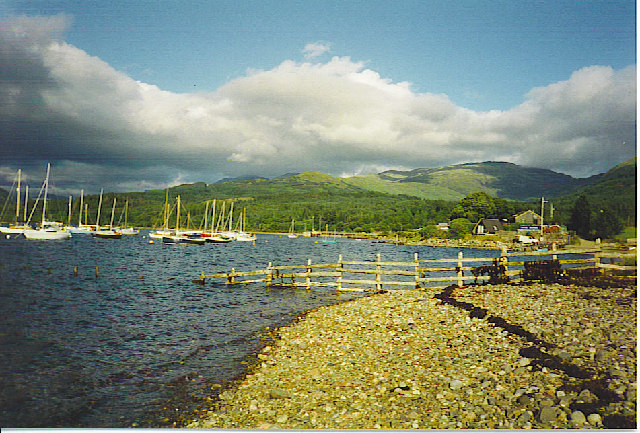
Loch Creran at Barcaldine

Barcaldine (Scottish Gaelic: Am Barra Calltainn) is a small settlement in Scotland centred on the historic Barcaldine House and located on the banks of Loch Creran between Oban and Ballachulish.

There was formerly a railway station here.

Barcaldine Castle is located a few kilometres to the west. The castle was built in the 15th century by Sir Douglas Campbell of Glenorchy (or Glen Orchy). There is also Barcaldine House Hotel.

The town of Barcaldine in western Queensland, Australia is named (indirectly) after Barcaldine in Argyll.
