= Benderloch =

Coordinates: 56°29′32″N 5°24′13″W

Benderloch: Scottish Gaelic: Meadarloch
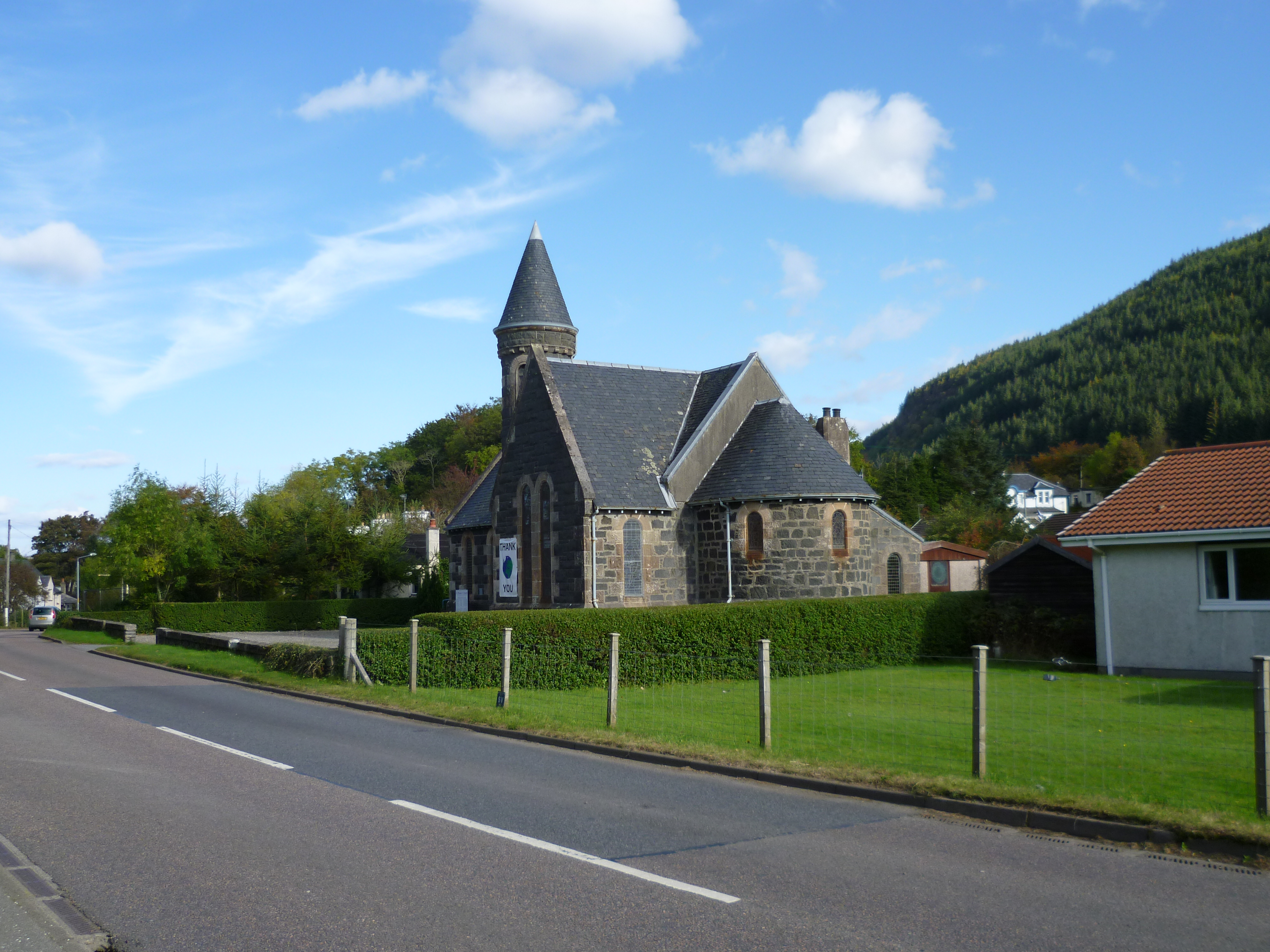
- St Modan's Church, Benderloch, October 2014

- Location within Argyll and Bute
- OS grid reference: NM903388
- Council area: Argyll and Bute
- Lieutenancy area: Argyll and Bute
- Country: Scotland
- Sovereign state: United Kingdom
- Post town: OBAN
- Postcode district: PA37
- Police: Scotland
- Fire: Scottish
- Ambulance: Scottish
- UK Parliament: Argyll, Bute and South Lochaber
- Scottish Parliament: Argyll and Bute

Benderloch (Scottish Gaelic: Meadarloch, pronounced [ˈmet̪əɾl̪ˠɔx]) is a village in Argyll and Bute, Scotland. The name is derived from Beinn eadar dà loch, meaning "mountain between two lochs".

Benderloch lies on the A828 road in the coastal parish of Ardchattan and Muckairn, Argyll, Scotland. It grew up as the railway line from Ballachulish to Connel was completed in the early part of the 1900s, between the older locations of Selma and Craigneuk. It is marked on 1900s Ordnance Survey maps as New Selma. Its railway station closed in 1966. Benderloch has a village shop (the renowned "Pink Shop"), garage, caravan and leisure store, cafe and a forest walk up to a viewpoint on the summit of Beinn Lora. Benderloch forms part of the Lynn of Lorn National Scenic Area, one of forty in Scotland.
