= Falls of Lora =

Tidal race at the mouth of Loch Etive in Argyll and Bute, Scotland

Coordinates: 56°27′25″N 5°23′15″W

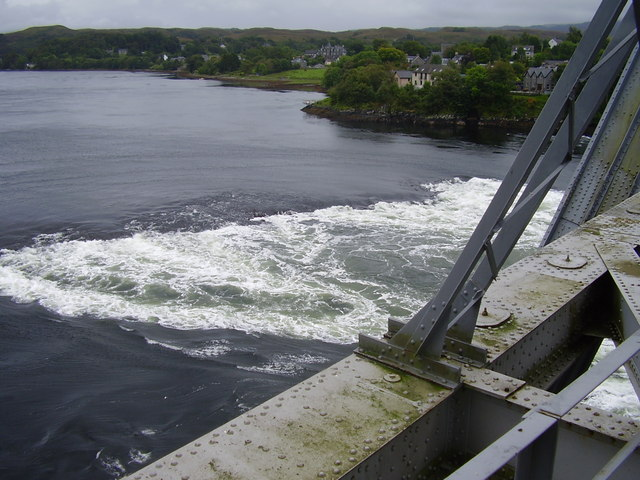
The falls from Connel Bridge

Kayakers playboating on Falls of Lora

The Falls of Lora is a tidal race which forms at the mouth of Loch Etive when a particularly high tide runs out from the loch. They form white water rapids for two to five days either side of the spring tides.

== Description ==
The falls of Lora are generated when the water level in the Firth of Lorn (i.e. the open sea) drops below the level of the water in Loch Etive as the tide goes out. As the seawater in Loch Etive pours out through the narrow mouth of the loch, it passes over a rocky shelf which causes the rapids to form. As the tide rises again there is a period of slack water when the levels are the same on either side. However, due to the narrow entrance to the Loch, the tide rises more quickly than the water can flow into the Loch. Thus there is still considerable turbulence at high tide caused by flow into the Loch. Thus, unlike most situations where slack water is at high and low tides, in the case of the Falls of Lora slack water occurs when the levels on either side are the same, not when the tidal change is at its least. As a result, the tidal range is much greater on the coast than it is inside the loch. A 3-metre (10 ft) range at Oban may produce only a 1.3-metre (4 1/2 ft) range at Bonawe on the loch shore.

The loch mouth is spanned by Connel Bridge.

The race is popular with white water kayakers and divers as well as tourists and photographers.
