= Loch Etive =

Lake in Scotland

Coordinates: 56°29′N 5°09′W

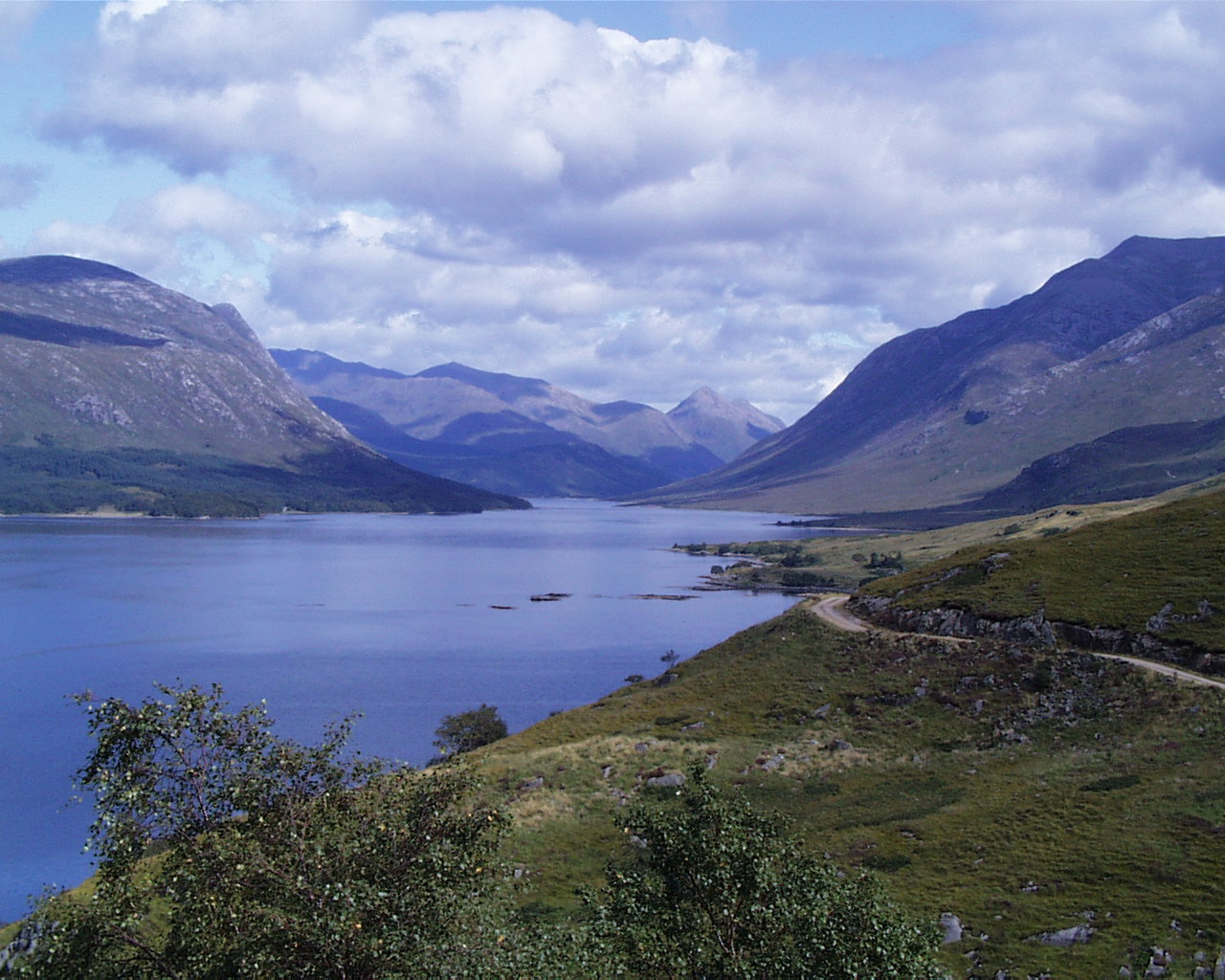
Loch Etive looking northeast from Sron nam Feannag

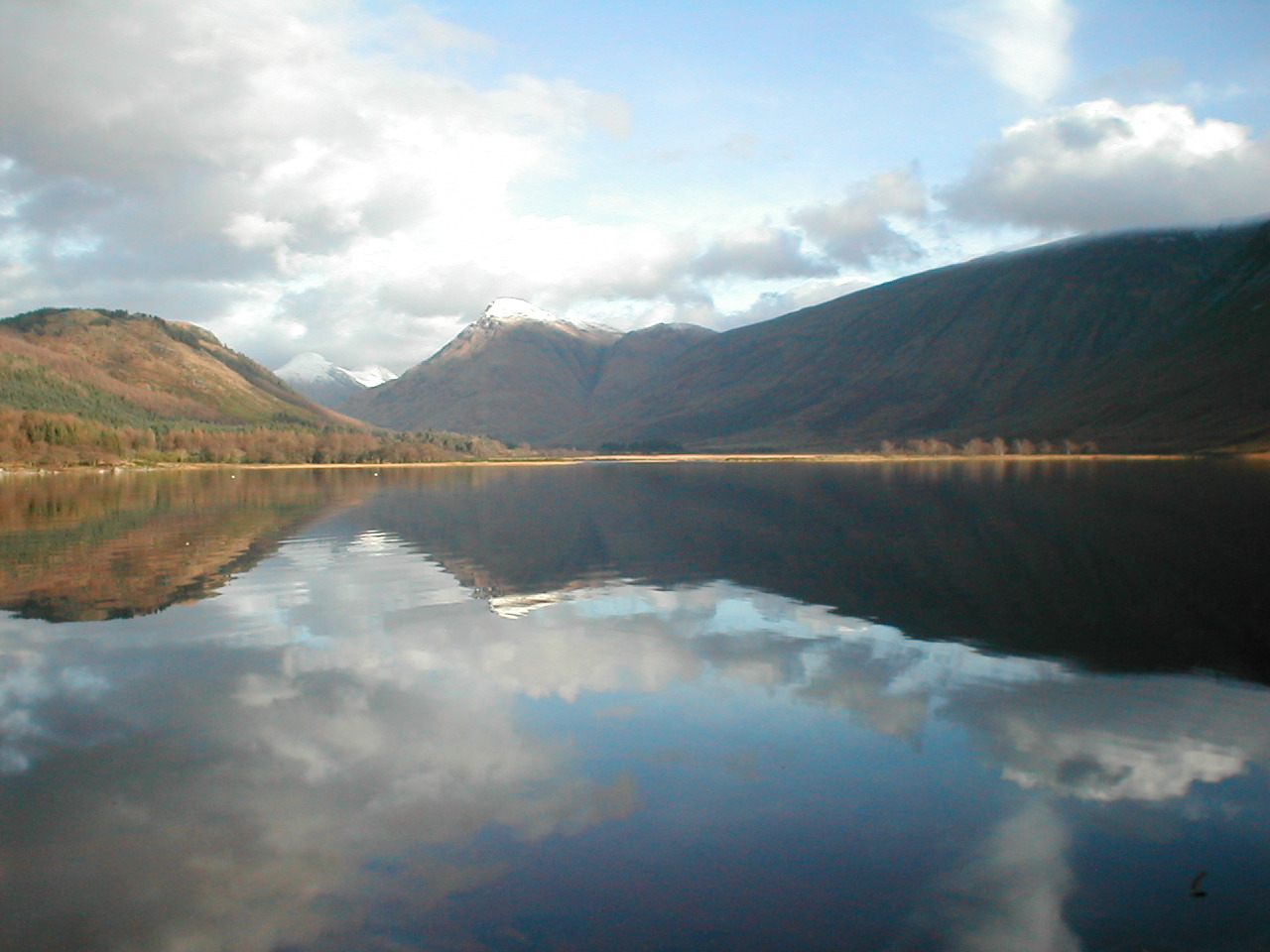
Reflections on Loch Etive

Loch Etive (Scottish Gaelic, Loch Èite) is a 30 km sea loch in Argyll and Bute, Scotland. It reaches the sea at Connel, 5 km north of Oban. It measures 31.6 km (19 3/4 miles) long and from 1.2 km (3/4 mile) to 1.6 km (1 mi) wide. Its depth varies greatly, up to a maximum of 150 m (490 ft).

The name Etive is believed to mean "little fierce one" from the Gaelic goddess associated with the loch. It heads east for half its length alongside the main road and rail link to Oban, before heading northeast into mountainous terrain. A road along Glen Etive makes the head of the loch accessible from Glen Coe. The narrow mouth of the loch results in its most unusual feature, the Falls of Lora. Part of the north bank has been designated a Special Area of Conservation in particular due to old sessile oak woods. A small colony of around 20 common seals is resident in the loch.

Just seaward of the mouth of the loch is Dunstaffnage Castle. This was a stronghold of the kingdom of Dál Riata until the 9th century, and possibly its centre at one time. It is believed to have held the Stone of Scone before its transfer to Scone Palace. The current ruins date from 1275. Cruises up Loch Etive followed by carriage trip to Glen Coe were started in 1881 as Oban developed as a fashionable resort.

Connel Bridge, a cantilever bridge over the loch at the Falls of Lora, was built in 1903 for the Connel to Ballachulish railway. A rail-bus ferried foot passengers across from 1909 until 1914 when the bridge was converted to allow for rail, road, and passenger traffic (on the same track). Since the railway line closed in 1966, the bridge has been solely for road traffic.

In the parish of Ardchattan, on the north shore, stands the ruin of St Modan's Priory, founded in the 13th century for Cistercian monks of the Valliscaulian Order. It is said that Robert Bruce held within its walls the last parliament in which the Gaelic language was used.

== Other usage ==
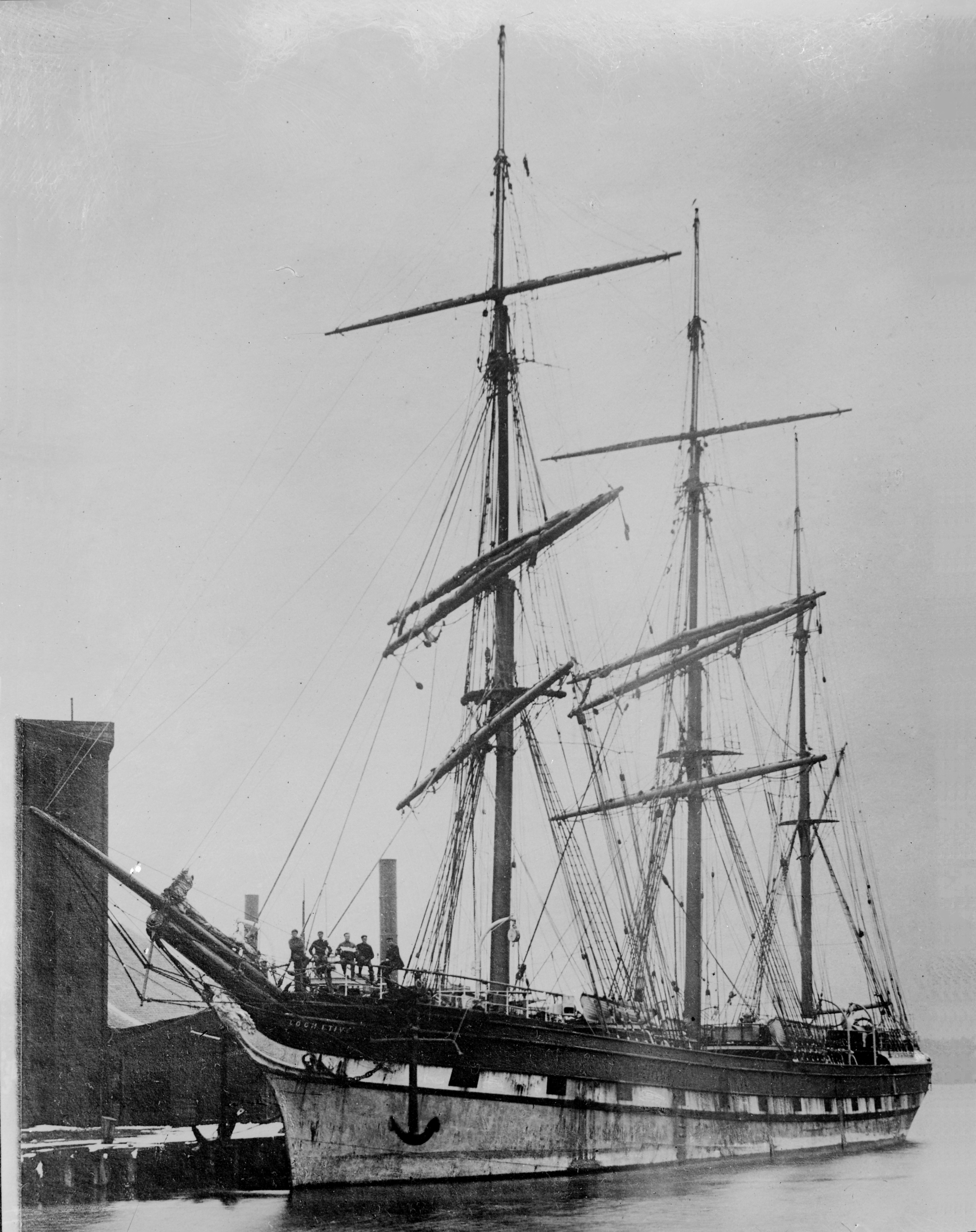
The sailing ship Loch Etive in 1877.

Loch Etive was the name of an Iron Clipper Ship that Joseph Conrad served aboard.

In geology, Etive is also the name of a geological Formation of the North Sea stratigraphy, named after the Loch.

== Gallery ==
- Category:Loch Etive (ship, 1877) on Wikimedia Commons.
