= Ballachulish railway station =

Railway station in Scotland

Ballachulish
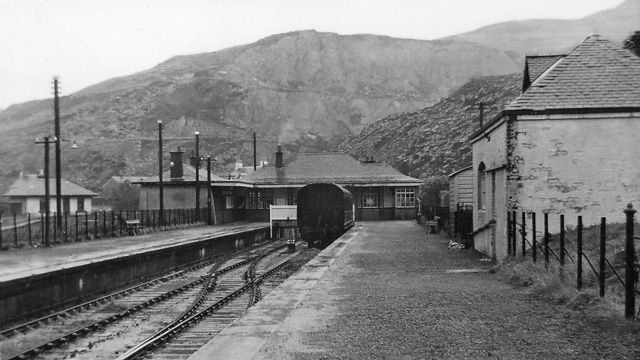
- Ballachulish railway station in 1961

General information
- Location: Glencoe, Highland; Scotland
- Coordinates: 56.6783°N 5.1308°W
- Line: Ballachulish branch line
- Platforms: 2

Other information
- Status: Disused

History
- Original company: Callander and Oban Railway
- Pre-grouping: Callander and Oban Railway operated by Caledonian Railway
- Post-grouping: LMS

Key dates
- 24 August 1903: Opened as Ballachulish
- July 1905: Renamed as Ballachulish & Glencoe
- 1908: Renamed as Ballachulish (Glencoe) for Kinlochleven
- 25 May 1953: Closed
- 24 August 1953: Re-opened
- 28 March 1966: Closed
Location

Ballachulish was a railway station at Ballachulish on the southern shore of Loch Leven at East Laroch (south Ballachulish) in Highland. It was the terminus of the Ballachulish branch line that linked to the main line of the Callander and Oban Railway at Connel Ferry.

== History ==
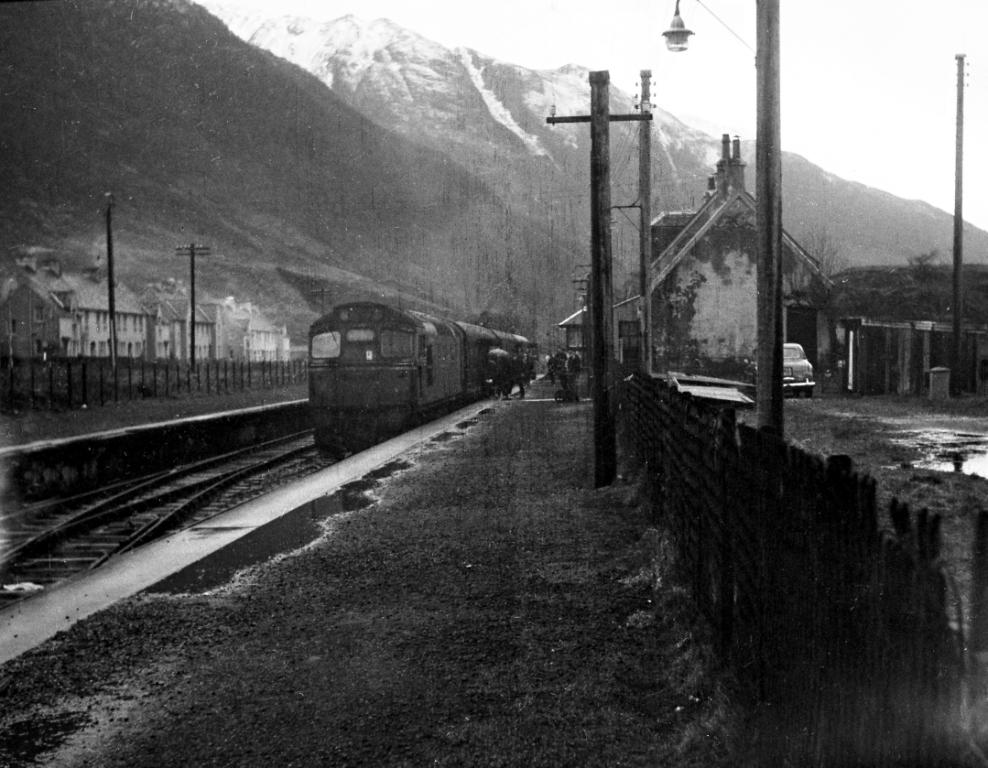
Train arriving in pouring rain at Ballachulish to form last train to Oban, 26 March 1966

This station opened as Ballachulish on 24 August 1903 with two platforms. There was a goods yard on the north side of the station. Within two years it was renamed as Ballachulish & Glencoe and renamed again following the opening of the 'new' road between Glencoe Village and Kinlochleven in 1908 as Ballachulish (Glencoe) for Kinlochleven. Apart for a short closure in 1953, this latter name remained until closure in 1966. In the railway timetables the name was shortened to simply Ballachulish with a note stating "Ballachulish is the Station for Glencoe and Kinlochleven".

The station was opened by the Callander and Oban Railway, which was absorbed into the London, Midland and Scottish Railway during the Grouping of 1923. The station then passed to the Scottish Region of British Railways on nationalisation in 1948, and was closed by the British Railways Board in 1966, when the Ballachulish Branch closed.

In the early 1990s the station buildings were converted into a medical centre.

Houses have been built in the station yard. The engine shed remained, being used by a local garage until 2015, when it was demolished to make way for more private housing.

=== Stationmasters ===
- James Skinner 1903 - 1914
- William Reid 1938 - 1941 (afterwards station master at Callander)
- George Roger 1941 - 1943 (formerly station master at Burrelton)
- Duncan Donald MacNaughton 1943 - 1947 (formerly station master at Errol, afterwards station master at Coupar Angus)
- James Matthewson from 1959 (formerly station master at Kirriemuir)

| Preceding station | Historical railways | Following station |
|---|---|---|
| Ballachulish Ferry; Line and station closed | Callander and Oban Railway; Ballachulish Branch; Caledonian Railway | Terminus |

== Signalling ==
Throughout its existence, the Ballachulish Branch was worked by the electric token system. Ballachulish signal box was located west of the platforms, on the north side of the railway. It had 21 levers.
