= Connel Ferry railway station =

Railway station in Argyll and Bute, Scotland

Connel Ferry Scottish Gaelic: Aiseag na Coingheil
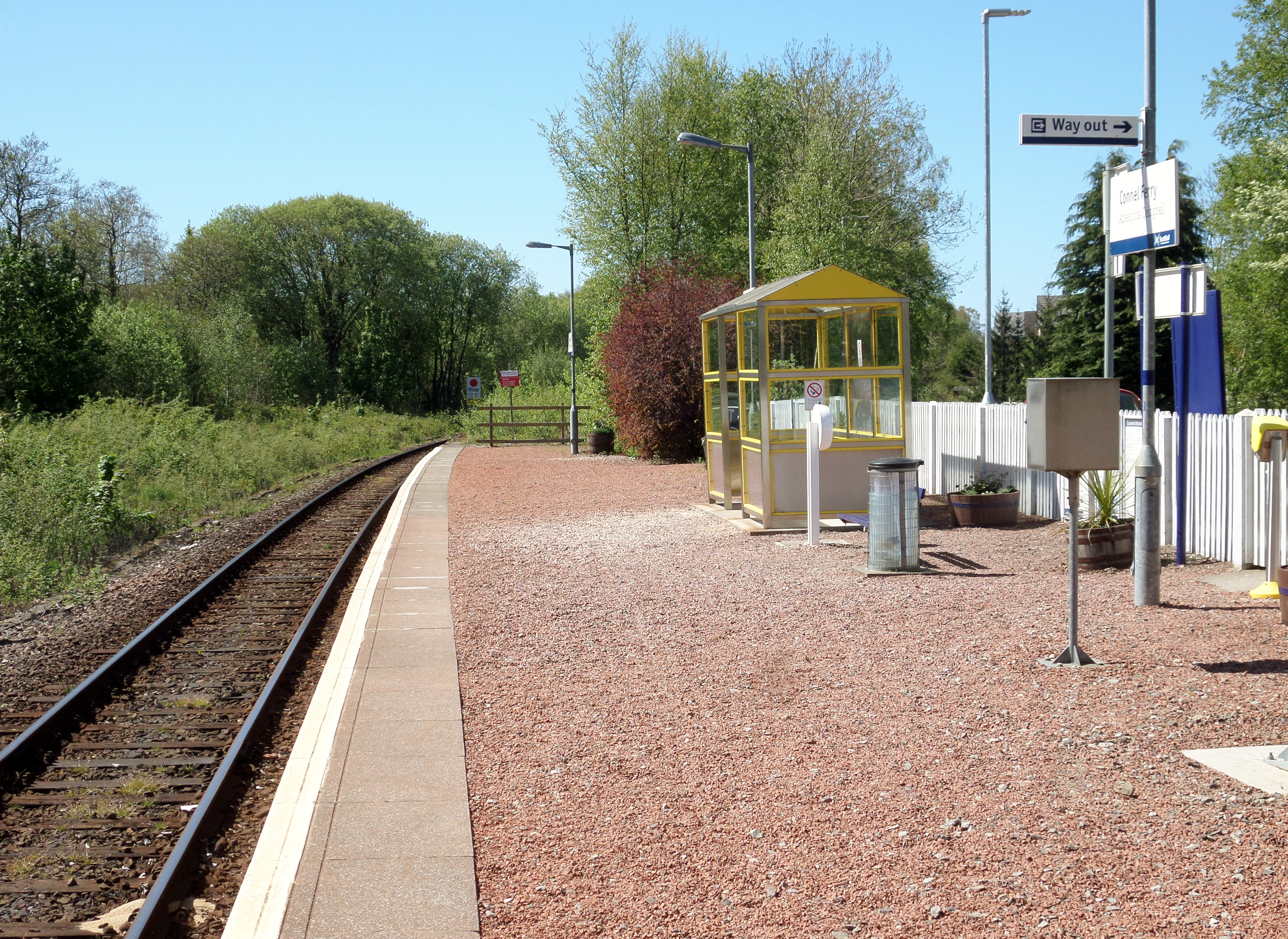

General information
- Location: Connel, Argyll and Bute; Scotland
- Coordinates: 56.4524°N 5.3834°W
- Grid reference: NM916340
- Manager: ScotRail
- Lines: West Highland Line; Ballachulish branch line
- Platforms: 1

Other information
- Station code: CON

History
- Original company: Callander and Oban Railway
- Pre-grouping: Callander and Oban Railway operated by Caledonian Railway

Key dates
- 1 July 1880: Opened

Passengers
- 2021/22: ▲15,630
- 2022/23: ▲18,620
- 2023/24: ▲22,348
- 2024/25: ▼18,594
- 2025/26: ▲18,996
Location
Notes
- Passenger statistics from the Office of Rail and Road

Connel Ferry railway station is a railway station serving the village of Connel in western Scotland. This station is on the Oban branch of the West Highland Line, originally part of the Callander and Oban Railway, between Oban and Taynuilt, sited 65 miles 30 chains (105.2 km) from Callander via Glen Ogle. All services are operated by ScotRail, who also manage the station.

== History ==
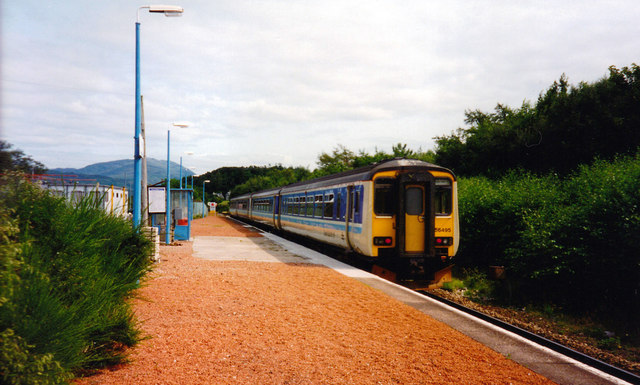
The station seen in 1994

The station was opened in either 1880 or 1903, and in its heyday, when it served a branch to Ballachulish, it had three platforms, a goods yard and a turntable. Later this was reduced to just the single platform, after the branch closed in 1966, as it remains today.

=== Accidents and incidents ===
During the 1968 demolition of Connel Ferry West signal box, contractors burning the wooden remains set fire to the track formation. Despite efforts to put the fire out, it continued to burn for several days, causing the embankment to crumble and smoke to issue from fissures in the trackbed. This resulted in a 5 mph speed restriction being imposed and, at the time, caused concerns that the line may be forced to close.

== Facilities ==
Facilities at the station are basic, consisting of just a shelter, a bench, bike racks, a help point and a small car park. As there are no facilities to purchase tickets, passengers must buy one in advance, or from the guard on the train.

== Passenger volume ==
Passenger Volume at Connel Ferry
	2004–05	2005–06	2006–07	2007–08	2008–09	2009–10	2010–11	2011–12	2012–13	2013–14	2014–15	2015–16	2016–17	2017–18	2018–19	2019–20	2020–21	2021–22	2022–23	2023–24	2024–25
Entries and exits	3,268	3,482	3,834	4,058	4,330	4,088	4,056	4,316	4,004	4,400	8,564	6,592	6,262	7,272	6,996	7,220	14,552	15,630	18,620	22,348	18,594

The statistics cover twelve month periods that start in April.

== Services ==
As of the May 2026 timetable, there are 6 departures in each direction weekdays and Saturdays, with trains heading eastbound to Glasgow Queen Street and westbound to Oban. On weekdays only, there is also a service in each direction to and from Oban and Dalmally. On Sundays, there are four departures each way.

Preceding station	National Rail	Following station
Taynuilt	ScotRail; West Highland Line	Oban
	Historical railways	
Ach-na-Cloich; Line open; Station closed	Callander and Oban Railway; Caledonian Railway	Oban; Line and station open
Ach-na-Cloich; Line open; Station closed	Callander and Oban Railway; Ballachulish Branch; Caledonian Railway	North Connel; Line and station closed

== Bibliography ==
- Butt, R. V. J. (October 1995). The Directory of Railway Stations: details every public and private passenger station, halt, platform and stopping place, past and present (1st ed.). Sparkford: Patrick Stephens Ltd. ISBN 978-1-85260-508-7. OCLC 60251199. OL 11956311M.
- Fryer, Charles (1989). The Callander and Oban Railway. Oxford: Oakwood Press. ISBN 0-8536-1377-X. OCLC 21870958.
- Jowett, Alan (March 1989). Jowett's Railway Atlas of Great Britain and Ireland: From Pre-Grouping to the Present Day (1st ed.). Sparkford: Patrick Stephens Ltd. ISBN 978-1-85260-086-0. OCLC 22311137.
