= Callander and Oban Railway =

Former railway line in Scotland

The Callander and Oban Railway company was established with the intention of linking the sea port of Oban to the railway network. This involved a long line from Callander through wild and thinly populated terrain, and shortage of money meant that the line was opened in stages from 1866 to 1880.

The line improved the economy of Oban, especially for the fishing trade and for tourism, but the winter traffic was limited. The company built a branch to Ballachulish, which included the construction of Connel Bridge, a remarkable bridge at Connel over Loch Etive. The branch opened in 1903, but although it opened up remote areas it was never commercially successful. It closed in 1966.

The main line was crossed by the West Highland Line at Crianlarich, where a connecting spur was constructed by the West Highland Line in 1897. The C&OR section between Callander and Crianlarich was closed in September 1965. However, the section between Crianlarich and Oban is still in use today, with trains using the connecting spur at Crianlarich.

== History ==
=== Origins ===
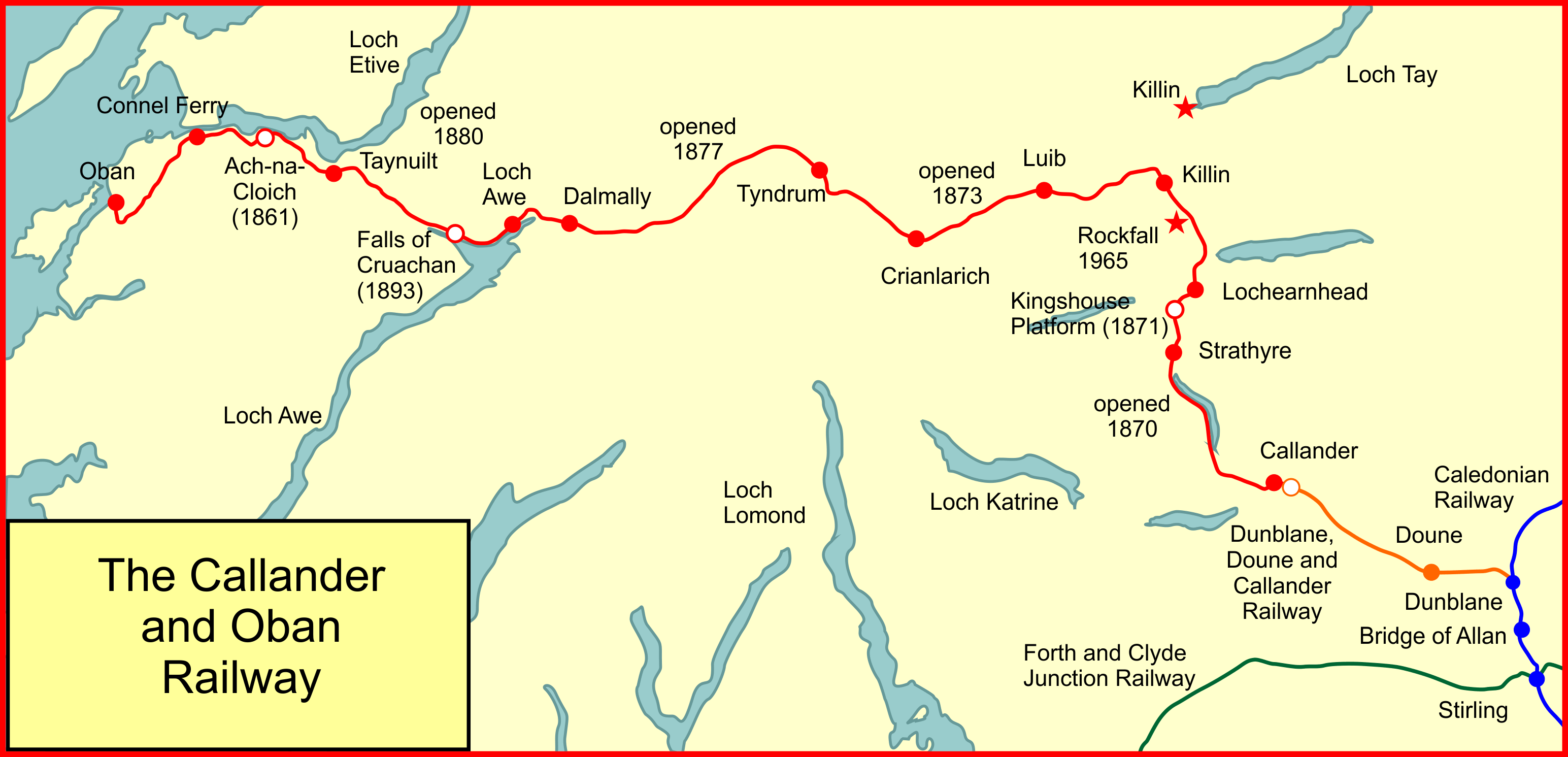
System map of the Callander and Oban Railway

The Scottish Central Railway and the Caledonian Railway were, as many others, incorporated by acts of Parliament, the Scottish Central Railway Act 1845 (8 & 9 Vict. c. clxi) and the Caledonian Railway Act 1845 (8 & 9 Vict. c. clxii), on 1 July 1845. At this stage the two companies were collaborating, with the intention of connecting Perth with Carlisle, and beyond to the emerging English railway network; the Scottish Central had immediate plans with allied companies to reach Aberdeen, and there was early on talk of reaching into the north-west Highland area.

In 1846 the Dunblane, Doune and Callander Railway was proposed for a ten-mile (16 km) line along the valley of the River Teith. This was a false start, but a second attempt was authorised on 21 July 1856. The line opened on 1 July 1858.

Callander was the western extremity of lowland terrain: beyond lay wild highland hills. Promoters now considered whether Callander would make a good starting location for a line penetrating the Highlands, and reaching the western sea at Oban 71 miles (114 km) away, with relatively few settlements in between. They decided in November 1864 that the line should be built, and they called it the Callander and Oban Railway.

Callander and Oban Railway Act 1865
- Act of Parliament
- Parliament of the United Kingdom
- Long title: An Act for making a Railway from the Town of Oban in the County of Argyle to the Dunblane, Donne, and Callander Railway near Callander in the County of Perth, with a Tramway to the Harbour of Oban; and for other Purposes.
- Citation: 28 & 29 Vict. c. cclxvi

Dates
- Royal assent: 5 July 1865

Text of statute as originally enacted

From Oban back to Crianlarich the route was clear; from there to the River Clyde they left the route open; they had calculated they needed £600,000 to build their line, and there was no possibility of local people investing that kind of money. The only way forward was to persuade another, established line to put some money in: the route would be determined by that fact. The Scottish Central was prepared to put up £200,000, and this was confirmed by agreement of 17 December 1864; the route from Crianlarich would accordingly go east to Callander and Dunblane. A parliamentary bill was submitted in the 1865 session and the railway was authorised by the Callander and Oban Railway Act 1865 (28 & 29 Vict. c. cclxvi) on 8 July 1865. The authorised capital was £600,000 with loans of £200,000.

The Dunblane, Doune and Callander railway was absorbed by the Scottish Central Railway on 31 July 1865 by the Scottish Central and Dunblane, Doune and Callander Railways Amalgamation Act 1865 (28 & 29 Vict. c. cxxxiii), and the Scottish Central amalgamated with the Caledonian Railway the following day, 1 August 1865, by an act of Parliament, the Caledonian and Scottish Central Railways Amalgamation Act 1865 (28 & 29 Vict. c. cclxxxvii) of 5 July 1865.

=== Construction ===
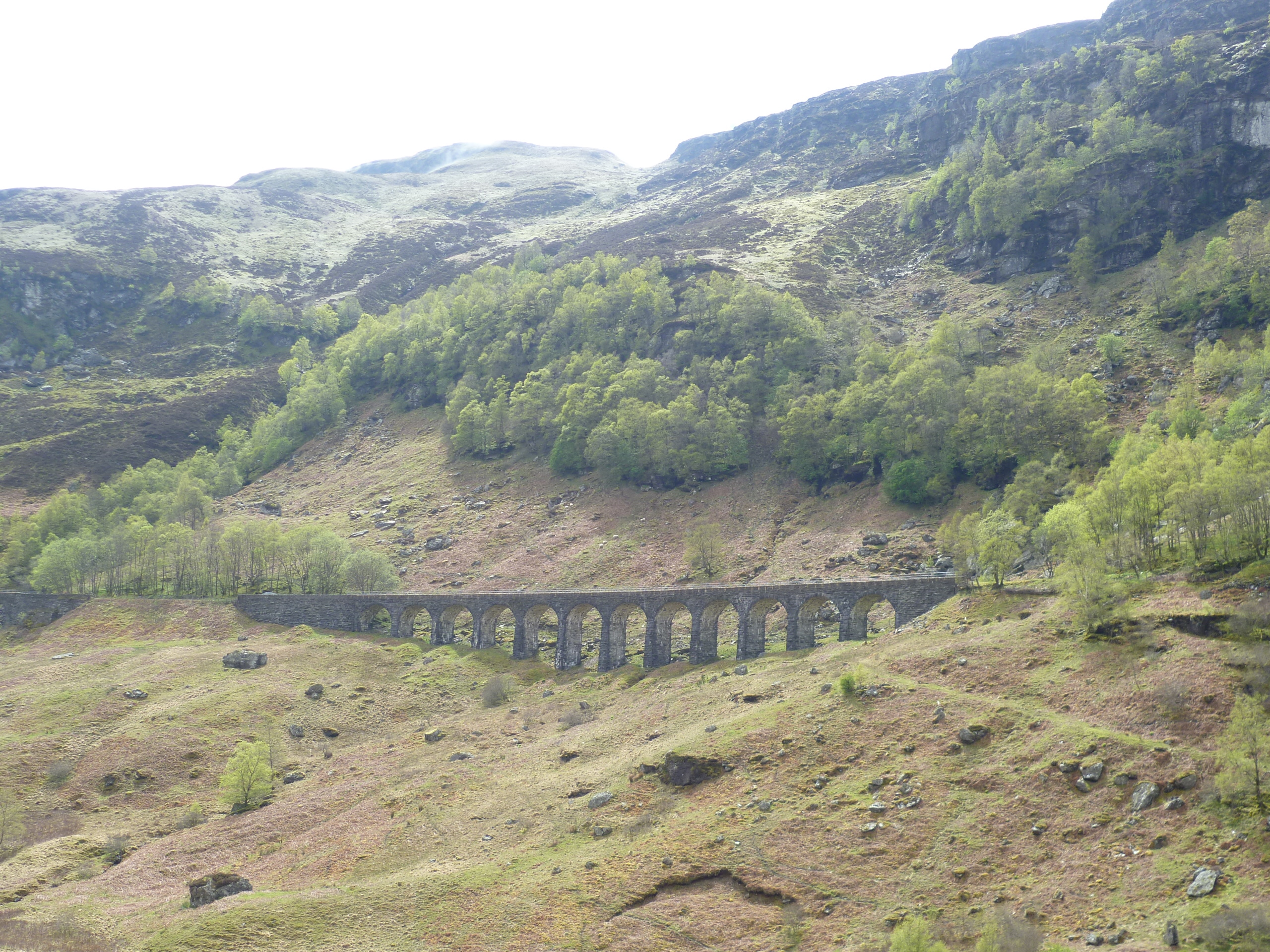
Glen Ogle viaduct

The Caledonian had expended a lot of energy and much money in securing leases of local railways; they had committed themselves to perpetual annual lease charges; at the same time they were expanding their hold in the Lanarkshire coal and iron fields. The Scottish Central had committed to a major investment in the Callander and Oban, and the Caledonian now assumed that obligation; when they examined the situation they were not happy with what they had acquired. Local investors in the thinly populated area had to find £400,000; if they did not, the Caledonian would be asked to make up the shortfall. However, their policy of securing territory would be at risk if they cancelled the project: the rival North British Railway might pick up the scheme.

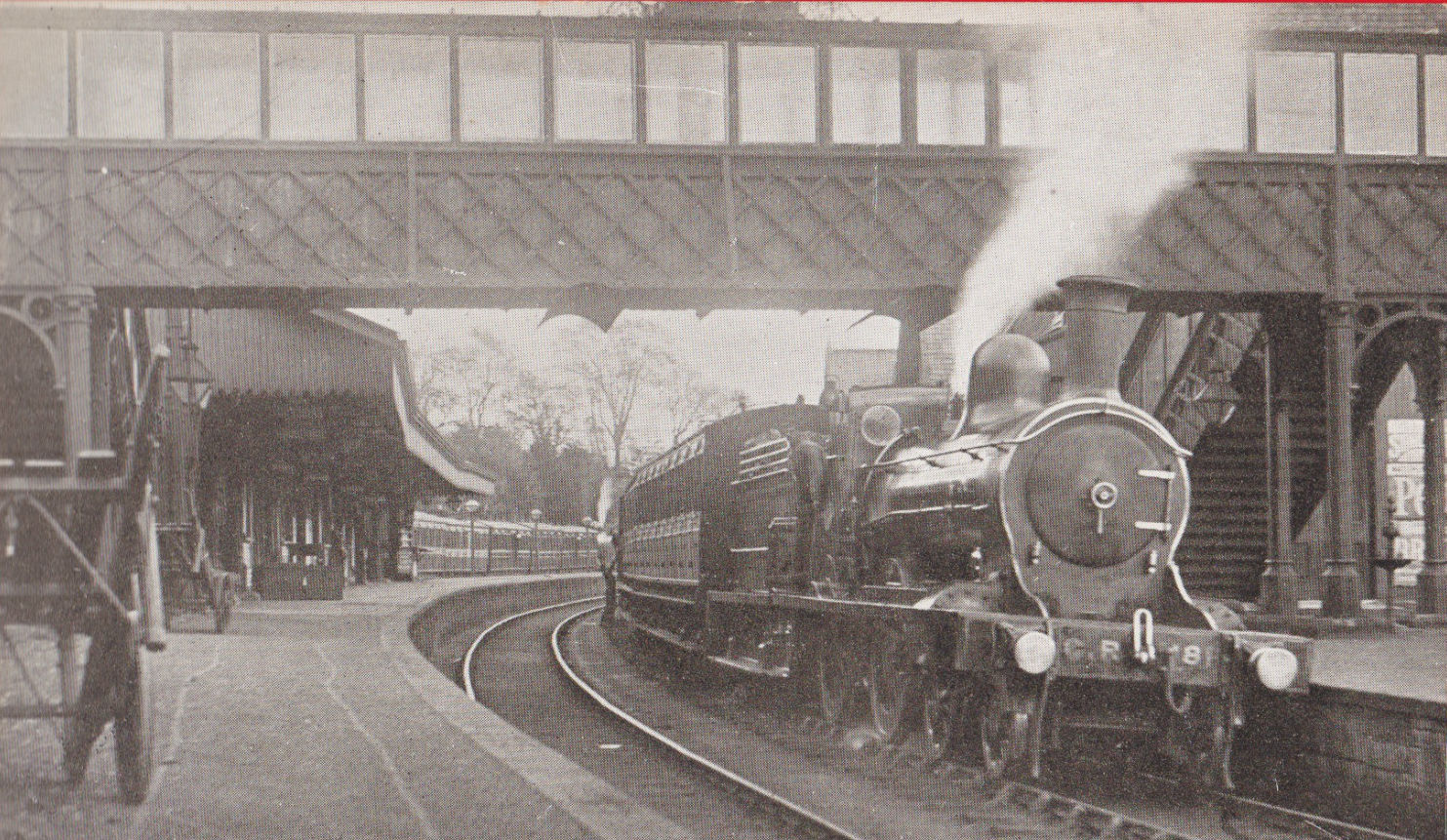
Callander station

The new company needed a secretary, and the man appointed was John Anderson, formerly of the Edinburgh and Glasgow Railway. His remarkable energy and creativity saw the little company through. The company's act only authorised the raising of money; it did not make it happen. Many who subscribed for shares in the first place immediately defaulted on being asked for the first call, and Anderson personally hawked round the West Highlands selling shares. There was no question of starting the construction of the whole line, but a start was to be made from Callander to Glen Ogle. A contract for £124,218 (equivalent to £12,780,000 in 2025) was let to John MacKay on 6 November 1866. (Note: But Ross states that work had started the previous month.)

In 1868 the Board of the Caledonian Railway came under heavy fire from shareholders; the Caledonian had inherited from the Scottish Central Railway the obligation to fund £200,000 of the C&OR's capital; many shareholders viewed honouring this as throwing good money after bad, and the board had a difficult time; but the arrangement remained in place.

Callander and Oban Railway (Abandonment, &c.) Act 1870
- Act of Parliament
- Parliament of the United Kingdom
- Long title: An Act to authorise the abandonment of a portion of the Callander and Oban Railway, to extend the time for the completion of another portion thereof; and for other purposes.
- Citation: 33 & 34 Vict. c. ix

Dates
- Royal assent: 12 May 1870

Text of statute as originally enacted

The work proceeded slowly, simply because the Company did not have the funds to pay the contractor. The hostility between the original C&OR directors and the Caledonian strengthened, and considering the limited progress, cancellation of the whole project was discussed. At length a definite decision was taken to end the railway at Tyndrum. This needed a variation to the authorising act of Parliament, and the Callander and Oban Railway (Abandonment, &c.) Act 1870 (33 & 34 Vict. c. ix) was passed in May 1870.

Despite the negative impact of the act, the first part of the line was nearing completion: it ran to the top of Glen Ogle, at an altitude of 944 feet (288 m). The station was to be called Killin, although that town was three miles (4.8 km) away down a steep mountain track; Killin had a population of 1,836 in 1871. The intermediate stations were Strathyre and Lochearnhead, which was also some distance from the place it served. The original Dunblane, Doune and Callander station at Callander was so obviously unsuitable that the C&OR built a new station behind the Dreadnought Hotel; the DD&CR station became a goods depot.

On 18 and 19 May 1870 Captain H. W. Tyler of the Board of Trade inspected the line and approved it. The line opened for business on 1 June 1870.

=== The line in operation ===
Callander and Oban Railway
Overview
- Locale: Scotland
- Dates of operation: 5 July 1865–31 December 1922
- Successor: London, Midland and Scottish Railway

Technical
- Track gauge: 4 ft 8 1/2 in (1,435 mm)

The Caledonian had agreed to work the line; there were to be two trains each way daily. The Caledonian paid the C&OR a toll for the use of the Callander station and the short section of line to the DD&CR section. Anderson had arranged for (road) coach connections at Killin for tourists and others; he described Glen Ogle as the Khyber Pass of Scotland. Summer passenger carryings were better than Anderson had expected, and soon a third daily return trip was added to the timetable.

The population of Kingshouse, between Strathyre and Lochearnhead, petitioned for a station. The C&OR refused but said the residents could build one themselves. They did so and it opened on 21 June 1871. The guards of trains were to note persons joining there to ensure that at the next C&OR station, their fare could be taken from them.

At the end of the summer, the timetable reverted to two trains daily; but the season had brought an income of £2,511 (equivalent to £260,000 in 2025) and the company was able to declare a dividend of 1%.

At this period the North British Railway ran certain excursion trains to Callander by agreement. However, the income to the C&OR was based on passenger numbers arriving, and in many cases this was two to three persons only, not compensating the C&OR for the business. Anderson asked the NBR to pay more, but the NBR discontinued the trains instead.

=== Extending to Tyndrum ===
Caledonian hostility to the C&OR had abated in time, and it was persuaded, against the wishes of some of its shareholders, to proceed with an extension to Tyndrum. Whereas the Killin station was at a wild mountain top with difficult roads, Tyndrum was strategically located in the valley of Strath Fillan, at 729 feet (222 m) at the junction of good roads. 17 miles (27 km) in much easier terrain posed no great engineering problem. The extension opened in August 1873. A small locomotive shed was built at Tyndrum, to service two trains a day.

Anderson continued to expend considerable energy in arranging tourist excursions by steamer and coach, making circular tours over the railway by several different routes. Coaches also completed the journey to Oban, over five hours away, and also Fort William later on.

=== Now to Dalmally ===
Callander and Oban Railway (Tyndrum to Oban) Act 1874
- Act of Parliament
- Parliament of the United Kingdom
- Long title: An Act for enabling the Callander and Oban Railway Company to complete their railway to Oban; and for other purposes.
- Citation: 37 & 38 Vict. c. cx

Dates
- Royal assent: 16 July 1874

The extension to Tyndrum seems not to have brought about the improvement that was hoped for, so far as the financial results were concerned, and it was clear that only extending to Oban would resolve the matter. The decision was taken and on 11 July 1874 the Callander and Oban Railway (Tyndrum to Oban) Act 1874 (37 & 38 Vict. c. cx) received royal assent. As before, raising the money was the problem, and as before Anderson was energetic in arranging it. The Caledonian itself subscribed £20,000. A contract was let for the section from Tyndrum to Dalmally; there were to be no intermediate stations, but the Tyndrum station was to be relocated a little further towards Oban. The earlier station was not at a location suitable for the extension and the through line would have to deviate from the terminus approach line.

The line opened as far as Dalmally, at the head of Loch Awe, on 1 May 1877. Coach connections to Oban were made with through tickets available; an overnight stay at Dalmally was required for many journeys. Complicated circular tours were arranged, even a day tour from Carlisle (leaving at 3.50 in the morning).

=== Finally to Oban ===
Soon the decision was taken to complete the line to Oban. As usual raising the money was the problem. The English London and North Western Railway had issued through tickets when the Dalmally extension started operating, and it cemented its interest in the line by taking £50,000 of shares.

The railway was to approach Oban from the south, but the steamer pier was at the north end of the town, and George Street, effectively the esplanade of Oban, was defended as having a beautiful outlook over the sea. Various schemes were put forward locally, all of which would have cost the C&OR money, and the company resolved the controversy by deciding to build its own Railway Pier at the south end of the town. Suddenly this displeased many people, including John Stuart McCaig, who was furious in his denunciation of the scheme. McCaig had an interest: he owned the existing (north) pier. (Note: McCaig later built McCaig's Tower, the famous coliseum replica that is the town's landmark, built in 1897.)

The line opened throughout to great ceremony on 30 June 1880. There were now five through trains from and to Callander daily, as well as a short working. As before, Anderson arranged a comprehensive series of connections with steamers for tourist purposes. The opening coincided with the summer season at a time when working people were getting holidays with pay, and huge numbers of passengers were carried, especially from the cities and towns of the central belt of Scotland.

Ordinary goods traffic was not so buoyant though it built up later. Despatch of smoked fish, and the fast conveyance of shellfish to London, became an important traffic.

At the end of the summer, 215,000 passengers had been carried, 250% more than previously. The winter traffic settled down; there were few tourists, just ordinary travellers, but the steamer service to the islands made the Oban railway a steady supply of trade, and Oban became the Charing Cross of the north.

=== Rock falls in the Pass of Brander ===
On 17 August 1881 a train was derailed in the Pass of Brander; there were no serious injuries, but it focussed on the risk to trains due to boulders falling on to the line from the high hillside directly above the railway. After much consideration a system of wire fences was installed, such that if a wire was broken by a falling boulder, special signals would automatically return to danger. The system was ready on 17 April 1883. The network of wires produced a humming sound in the wind, and local railway people nicknamed the system Anderson's piano. The system continues to this day and has generally worked well, although further derailments occurred in 1946 and 2010. The 2010 derailment was caused by a boulder which originated on railway land below Anderson's piano and therefore could not be detected.

=== More crossing places ===
The line was established with a limited number of crossing places for trains on the single line. Now that the route had trunk status by virtue of the steamer connections, delays to one train could expand into serious delays elsewhere. The staff and ticket system was rather inflexible, and it was replaced by the Tyer's train tablet system, with additional crossing places at Glenlochy (between Tyndrum and Dalmally), Awe Crossing between Lochawe and Taynuilt, Glencruitten Summit between Connel Ferry and Oban, and St Brides between Callander and Strathyre.

=== Fish ===
In the 1880s Stornoway was a centre of the fishing trade; the product had to be transported to market, and the Highland Railway had had a monopoly of the rail traffic. They had exploited their monopoly and the fish merchants were dissatisfied. Anderson offered cheap rates from Oban and a number of facilities for them free of charge. Notwithstanding the much longer sea crossing from Stornoway to Oban, the C&OR route attracted the traffic from the Highland. The Highland Railway reacted by improving its rates but much of the traffic remained with the C&OR.

=== A competing line ===
In 1889 interests in Lochaber proposed a railway from Fort William to the Clyde. If approved it would seriously erode the C&OR income: Fort William business came to Oban by steamer, and Tyndrum, to be served by the new line, was a railhead for considerable sheep traffic. The proposed line became known as the West Highland Railway, and despite C&OR opposition in Parliament, it received its authorising Act. The C&OR benefitted from carrying construction materials, but the competing line opened on 7 August 1894.

The West Highland Railway crossed over the C&OR line at Crianlarich and it was proposed that a connecting line be built; this was to be at the expense of the West Highland company, and it would be for the exchange of wagons, not as a through line. Much of the cattle and sheep traffic carried by the West Highland was destined for Stirling and Perth, and would be routed via Callander. The short line was quickly built, but actual commissioning was long delayed. It was suspected that the West Highland was happy to charge the traders for the considerable extra mileage via Glasgow. Eventually the line was opened on 20 December 1897.

People in Oban saw that there was a potential route to Glasgow that was 17 miles (27 km) shorter over the West Highland from Crianlarich than over the C&OR via Callander, but apart from a few tourist excursions this was not agreed to until the situation was forced in the 1960s.

=== Killin Railway ===
The Killin Railway opened to passenger operation on 1 April 1886. The Callander and Oban "Killin" station was renamed Glenoglehead on the same day. It ceased to be a passenger station on 1 April 1889, but passengers could have most trains stopped there by notifying the guard. That facility was withdrawn on 30 September 1891. Until the end of 1916, passengers for Killin by the early morning down train on Sundays could alight at Glenoglehead, where the train stopped to set down mail. From then on Glenoglehead functioned as a private halt for railway servants and as a crossing place.

=== A branch to Ballachulish ===
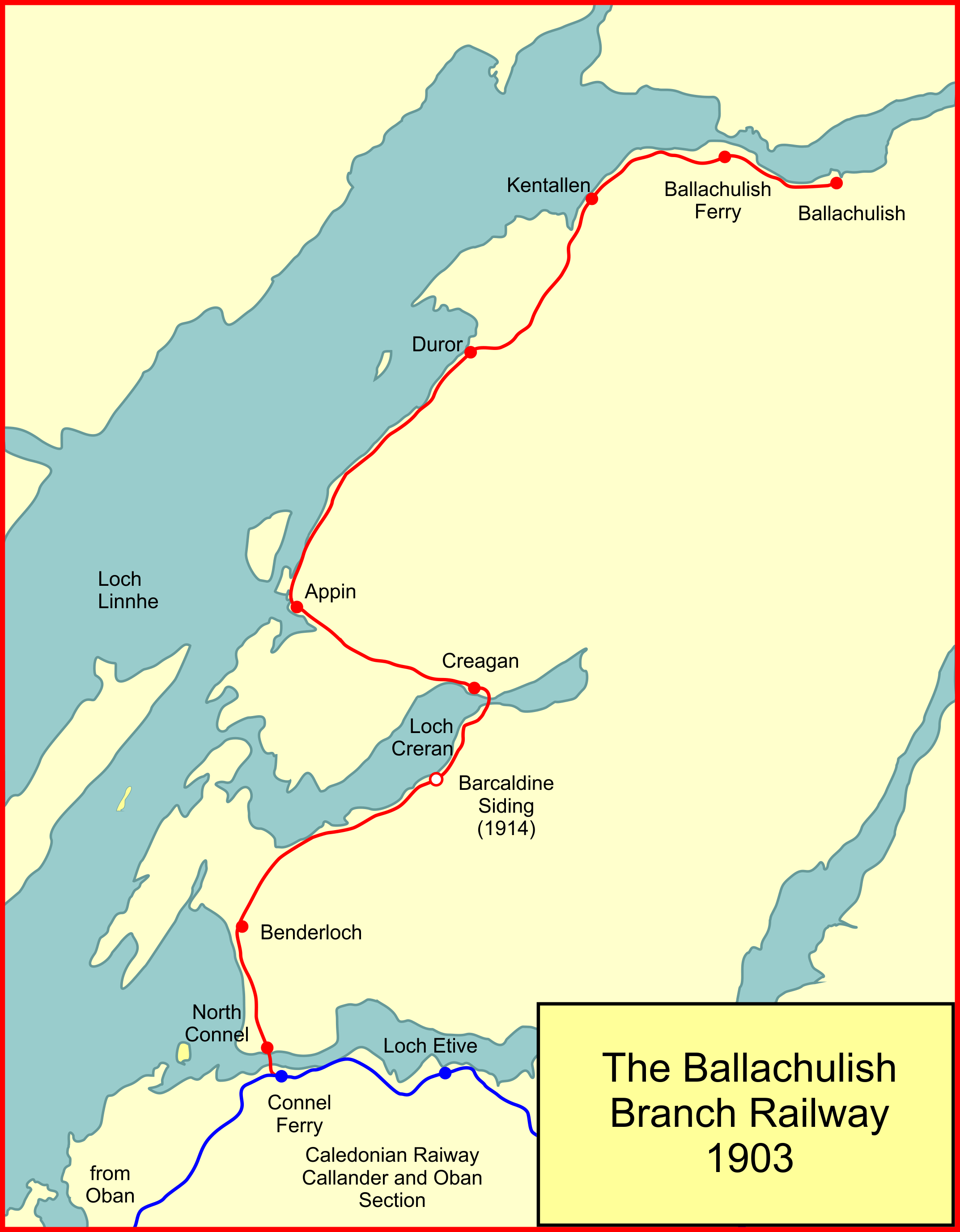
The Ballachulish branch railway

The West Highland Railway opened to Fort William in 1894, and interest was aroused in opening up other areas of the region. Railways along the Great Glen were proposed, and attention also turned to the tract of remote terrain between Oban and Fort William. Several sea lochs made road travel in the area difficult, and Argyll County Council had indicated that it would co-operate with the C&OR if the railway were to build dual-use bridges; the C&OR was considering an ambitious railway from Oban to Inverness by way of Fort William. The C&OR decided to decline the idea, and to make the railway on its own, and to work it itself. The C&OR had difficulty in raising enough money for a survey of the proposed line, but undaunted, it presented a parliamentary bill for the line in September 1894, for the following year's session.

The autonomy of the C&OR was evidently considerable, for its major shareholder, the Caledonian Railway, announced that they would oppose the bill in Parliament. This was an untenable situation and when Anderson consulted Lord Breadalbane it was made clear the proposal could not continue, and it was swiftly withdrawn.

The C&OR converted their proposal into a branch line to Ballachulish from Connel Ferry; the West Highland Railway also proposed a branch to Ballachulish from the north. Ballachulish had a population of 1,800 at the time, and its industry was chiefly quarrying.

Callander and Oban Railway Act 1896
- Act of Parliament
- Parliament of the United Kingdom
- Long title: An Act to empower the Callander and Oban Railway Company to extend their Railway from Connel Fernr to Ballachulish and for other purposes.
- Citation: 59 & 60 Vict. c. cxci

Dates
- Royal assent: 7 August 1896

Text of statute as originally enacted

Both railways were authorised by acts of Parliament on 7 August 1896, the Callander and Oban Railway Act 1896 (59 & 60 Vict. c. cxci) and the West Highland Railway Act 1896 (59 & 60 Vict. c. ccxix), but the West Highland scheme was subject to serious limitations, and that line was never built. The C&OR line was to have a triangular junction a Connel Ferry, and to cross Loch Etive by Connel Bridge which was second in Britain only to the Forth Bridge in length of the main span, and it was the largest single-span steel bridge in Britain. The route approved north of the bridge was later changed substantially, and a hotel was built at Loch Creran to serve a proposed station there; the hotel was never opened as the railway as built did not go there. The capital was to be £210,000 of which the Caledonian Railway agreed to fund £15,000.

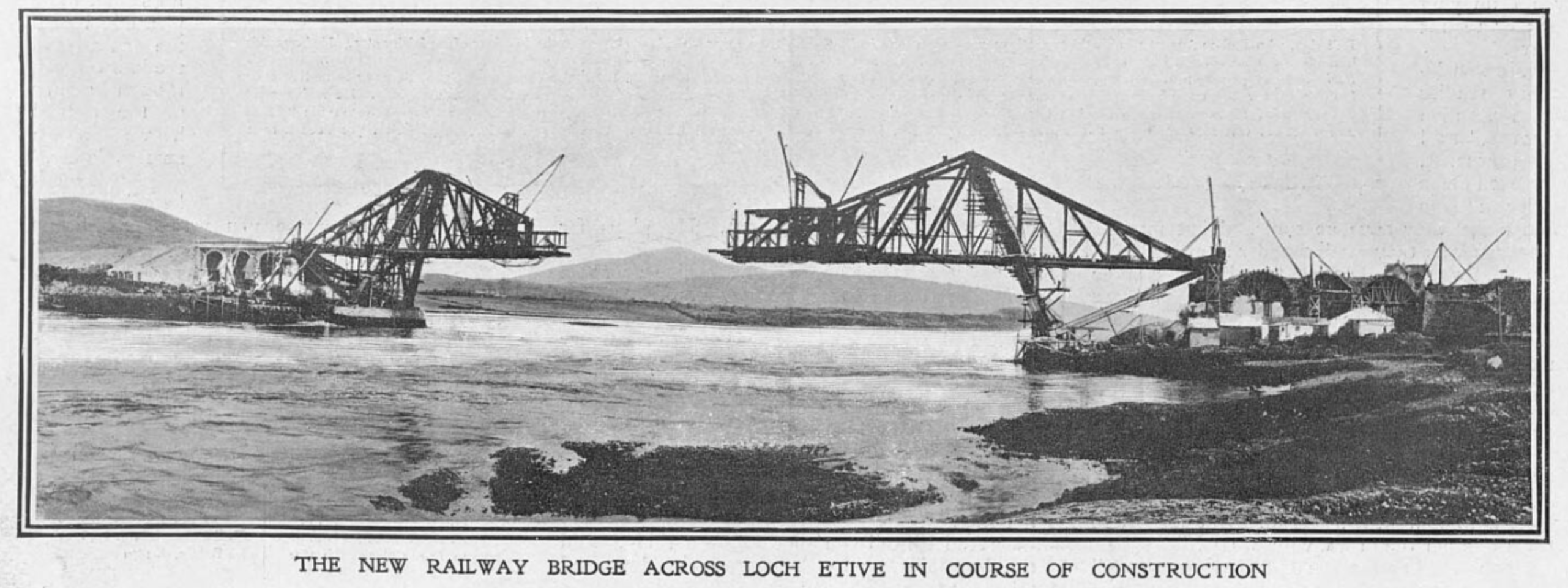
Connel Bridge under construction, from The Sphere, 15 August 1903

The Connel Bridge crossed the channel where a rapid rip ran at ebb tide, and intermediate piers or temporary staging were impossible. It was constructed by Arrol Bridge and Roofing Company, starting in 1898; it was done by building out cantilevers from each shore. There was another large bridge, Creagan Bridge, but no other large engineering work on the line, although considerable sections of bad ground were encountered. Connel Ferry station was extended to give an additional bay platform for Ballachulish trains. The western arm of the authorised triangle was never constructed. Ballachulish station had a two-platform terminal station.

The Connel and Creagan bridges had been provided with a footpath on one side, but this was not public. Anderson met Argyll County Council and offered to open the path on the Connel bridge in return for a payment of £800 per annum. The council thought this was excessive and the issue remained contentious for several years.

In 1909 the company instituted a shuttle passenger service over the bridge, between Connel Ferry and Benderloch, by motor charabanc converted with railway wheels. The service ran on Sundays also, even though the C&OR did not operate a Sunday service on the remainder of the network. The charabanc also conveyed a flat truck by request, on which private motor cars could be conveyed, for a fare of 15 shillings. The driver and any passengers remained in their own vehicle.

Private motoring increased over the years and the C&OR was pressed to permit motor cars to drive over the bridge, but the C&OR declared that it was impossible to make a roadway on the bridge. The demand to permit pedestrians to cross also continued to be declined.

The matter was resolved when in 1913 MacAlpine Downie applied to the Board of Trade to operate a chain ferry at the crossing. The C&OR immediately made arrangements to open the bridge to motor cars and pedestrians, and this was achieved on 22 June 1914; special signalling arrangements were made to secure the safety of the operation. The toll charge was between 7s 6d and 10s. The C&OR continued to make obstructions in the usage of the bridge: Thomas states that shepherds could take a flock of sheep across the bridge, but they must lead the animals one at a time. The company's policy on the bridge generated huge resentment over the years.

From the 1930s use of the railway declined, and the road network in the area was improved. As time passed the dominant use on the line was schoolchildren.

From 14 June 1965 the goods service on the line was discontinued, and on 28 March 1966 the line was closed completely. The Connel and Creagan bridges were transferred to the County Council, and became simple road bridges.

=== Train services ===
Over the years the summer passenger timetable became augmented as the tourism potential of the route enhanced. Sleeping cars to and from London were introduced from 1895, six nights a week in summer and once a week in winter. Package holidays were offered from 1905, which included hotel accommodation in Oban or certain other towns served by C&OR.

In 1903 the Lochearnhead, St Fillans and Comrie Railway completed a link between Crieff and the C&OR Lochearnhead station, and through trains were provided to and from Oban.

Goods traffic was handled by two trains each way daily in 1911, a fast and a slow service.

After World War I motor charabanc excursions became increasingly popular; roads had improved enough for these to run independently of the trains, although for some years the journey time was much slower. However, in 1928 a motor bus service was operated between Glasgow and Oban, with journey times comparable with the railway. The C&OR continued to encourage excursion traffic, often at very low fares.

On 10 June 1931 the first through passenger train was run via the West Highland line and the Crianlarich connection; it was a special excursion and made the journey in 83 minutes less than the fastest C&OR scheduled service.

The summer timetable in 1947, prior to nationalisation, shows four daily trains from Glasgow to Oban with three additional Saturday-only services. The Ballachulish branch had three daily passenger services.

=== Closure ===
The C&OR, part of the LMS railway since 1923, passed into national ownership in 1948.

In 1950s local use of the line declined heavily, and the contrast between summer and winter loadings became more extreme. As traffic declined, it was eventually decided that closure would take place between Dunblane and Crianlarich from 1 November 1965, the through traffic being diverted over the West Highland line and the Crianlarich connection.

The last excursion train was planned over the line for 27 September 1965, but in the small hours a rock fall took place in Glen Ogle. The blockage was considerable, and after engineering assessment it was obvious that re-opening for a few weeks was impracticable. The new timetable was instituted immediately, and Oban residents were pleasantly surprised to find that their journey time to Glasgow was significantly quicker; and the fares (calculated by mileage) were cheaper also. (The converse was the case for Edinburgh.) The London sleeping car was withdrawn.

=== The present day ===
The passenger service continues between Oban and Glasgow. There are six daily trains (one not running on Saturdays), taking about 3 hours 6 minutes, with an additional train from Oban to Dalmally and back primarily catering for schools traffic on Mondays to Fridays. Four trains run each way on Sundays. Some trains run combined with Fort William trains between Crianlarich and Glasgow.

=== Ben Cruachan Quarry Branch ===
A mineral branch was built to Ben Cruachan Quarry, climbing into the hill from a connection about one kilometre east of Loch Awe station. Referred to as the Ben Cruachan Quarry Branch, it closed in 1916. It was built as a zig zag railway so as to reach the quarry which was situated high on the steep mountainside.

During construction of the West Highland Railway, material was taken by rail from this branch for the viaducts on that line.

The quarry and the line closed in 1910. The line itself was dismantled around 1916. Its trackbed can still be clearly traced, and many of the wooden sleepers are still in situ.

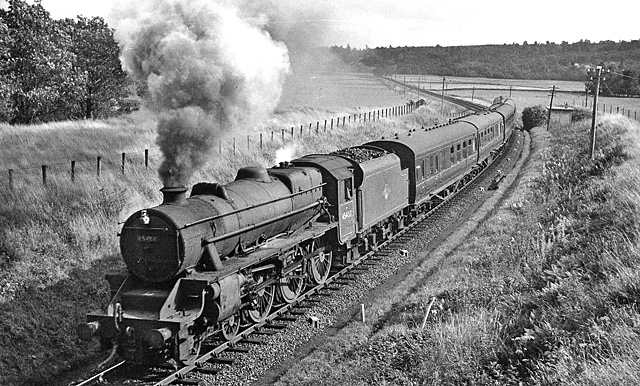
Glasgow - Oban express in Pass of Leny, near Callander in 1961

== Topography ==
=== Main line ===
The line opened from the junction with the Dunblane, Doune and Callander Railway near their station at Callander to "Killin" on 1 June 1870. The section from "Killin" to Tyndrum opened on 1 August 1873, and from there to Dalmally on 1 May 1877. The final section to Oban opened on 1 July 1880.

The line between Callander and Crianlarich Junction closed on 28 September 1965; the section from there to Oban remains in use.

- Junction with the Dunblane, Doune and Callander Railway near their station;
- Callander;
- Craig-na-Cailleach Platform; not advertised used by railwaymen and scholars; open circa 1922 closed after 1938
- Strathyre;
- Kingshouse; opened 21 June 1871; renamed Kingshouse Platform from 1931;
- Lochearnhead; renamed Balquhidder 1 July 1904 on opening of the St Fillans line; facing junction for that line;
- Killin; renamed Glenoglehead Crossing 1 April 1886; closed 30 September 1891;
- Killin Junction; opened 1 April 1886; trailing junction from Killin; an exchange station only;
- Luib;
- Crianlarich; renamed Crianlarich Lower from 1953;
- Crianlarich Junction; trailing junction for the West Highland connecting line;
- Tyndrum; terminus station replaced by a through station a short distance west on opening of extension to Dalmally; renamed Tyndrum Lower in 1953;
- Dalmally;
- Loch Awe; closed 28 September 1965; reopened 1 May 1985;
- Falls of Cruachan; used by excursionists from 1 October 1893 but not timetabled; until July 1908; closed 28 September 1965;
- Taynuilt;
- Ach-na-cloich; opened June 1881; closed 1 January 1917; reopened 1 March 1919; closed 1 November 1965;
- Connel Ferry; facing junction to Ballachulish; note; the ferry is long since defunct; the local settlement is named simply Connel;
- Oban.

The gradient from Callander was a climb of 1 in 61 for one and a half miles, and then broadly level beyond Strathyre; there a stiff climb of 1 in 60 started for five miles to Glenoglehead, a summit at 941 feet (287 m). The line then fell at 1 in 69 for five miles to Luib. Moderate undulations followed until a climb resumed after Crianlarich Junction at 1 in 61 to Tyndrum, stiffening to 1 in 49 for a mile to a second summit at 840 feet (260 m). There was then a descent at gradients up to 1 in 50 for twelve miles to beyond Dalmally. There was a third summit between Connel Ferry and Oban at 310 feet (94 m) approached at 1 in 50 for three and a half miles, with a similar fall to Oban.

=== Ballachulish branch ===
The line opened on 24 August 1903 and closed on 28 March 1966.

- Ballachulish;
- Ballachulish Ferry; closed 1 January 1917; reopened 1 March 1919;
- Kentallen;
- Duror;
- Appin;
- Creagan;
- Barcaldine; opened July 1914; closed 24 September 1939; reopened June 1948;
- Benderloch
- North Connel;
- Connel Ferry; see above.

== Residual use ==
Much of the eastern section has been converted to a cycle path known as the Rob Roy Way, with the Kendrum viaduct (on the Lochearnhead, St Fillans and Comrie Railway) restored in 2001 (the girders spanning the river having been scrapped).

Nearly all the stations on the Callander to Crianlarich section of the route have been demolished, with Callander station site now occupied by a car park, and Strathyre by housing. The site of Crianlarich Lower is now occupied by the Crianlarich Community Centre. Balquhidder and Luib stations are now caravan parks. The island platform at Killin Junction survives, though the area is now obscured with trees and undergrowth. Only Glenoglehead station building still stands, now in use as a private house.

Most of the underbridges have been removed or destroyed, but the impressive Glen Ogle viaduct still survives.

Parts of the trackbed between Killin Junction and Crianlarich have been obliterated by improvements to the A85 road.

The Creagan (Loch Creran) Bridge on the former Ballachulish branch was reconstructed as a road bridge in 1999, with a new deck on the retained and reconfigured stone piers. The Connel bridge is still in use as a road bridge.

Much of the track bed between Ballachulish and North Connel has been used as part of National Route 78 of the Sustrans National Cycle Network.
