= Dalavich Church =

Church building in Argyll and Bute, Scotland

Coordinates: 56°15′37.94″N 5°16′55.07″W

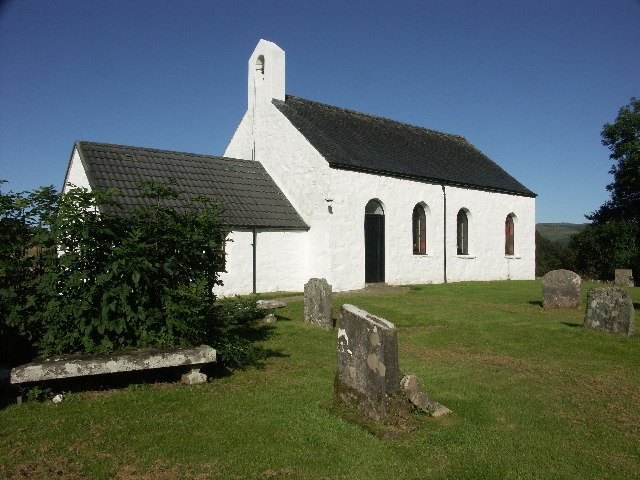
Dalavich Church in Argyll

Dalavich Church is a kirk (church) in the settlement of Dalavich in the Lorne district of Argyll in Scotland, belonging to the Church of Scotland. It is situated 14.0 miles (22.5 km) south of Taynuilt and 7.0 miles (11.3 km) south–west of Kilchrenan on the B845 road on the western shore of Loch Awe.

== History ==
Dalavich, originates from the Gaelic meaning "meadows near the River Avich". This small but handsome church, situated in idyllic surroundings near the shores of Loch Awe, was built in 1770 on the site of a much earlier church of rubble stone and is a category C(s) building. Built in traditional style, small and oblong, the church is embellished by round headed windows and is enclosed by a burial ground. A small bell tower was added to celebrate the millennium. It contains a stained glass window commemorating the life of local schoolmaster, Mr. Macpherson who lived across the loch at Ardchonnel. The earliest church in the area was just north of the hamlet at Kilmun, north of the River Avich between Loch Avich and Loch Awe; that chapel was dedicated to St. Munnu.

== In ancient times ==
A monk by the name of St. Mochoe of Nendrum, was reputed to live, as a hermit, near Dalavich where his 'living quarters' can still be seen. It is thought to be the earliest ecclesiastical site in Argyll, even older than those associated with St. Columba. The standing stones of that site are now in the custody and care of Dalavich Church.

== Today ==
Dalavich Church is co–joined with Kilchrenan Church and Muckcairn Church at Taynuilt.

== Post–Reformation ministers ==
- 1570 Neil Malcolm
- 1610 John Malcolm, son of above
