= Avich Falls =

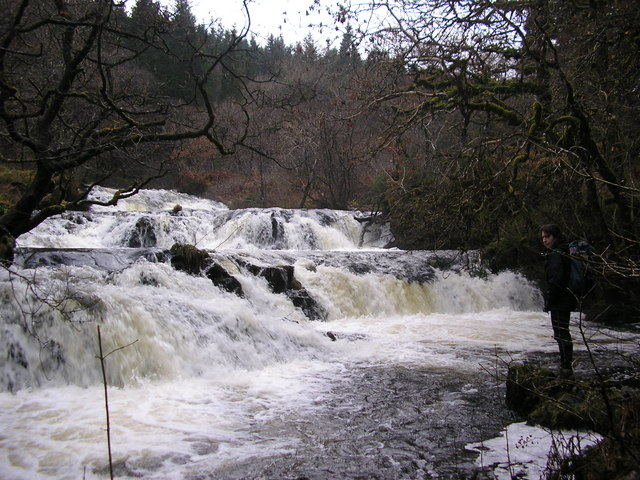
- Avich Falls in February 2009

- Location within Scotland
- Location: Dalavich, Argyll and Bute, Scotland
- Coordinates: 56.27471°N 5.28844°W
- Watercourse: River Avich

Avich Falls near Dalavich in Argyll and Bute is a waterfall in Scotland.

The River Avich flows about 1 mile (1.6 km) down the steep glacial valley of Loch Awe from Loch Avich and the falls are near the foot of the gully. There are several falls but the main one is of three cascades crossing open rocks. The falls are in the Inverliever Forest of the Barnaline estate, one of the first Forestry Commission estates in Scotland.
