= St Conan's Tower =

19th-century country house in Scotland

Coordinates: 56°24′0″N 5°2′54″W

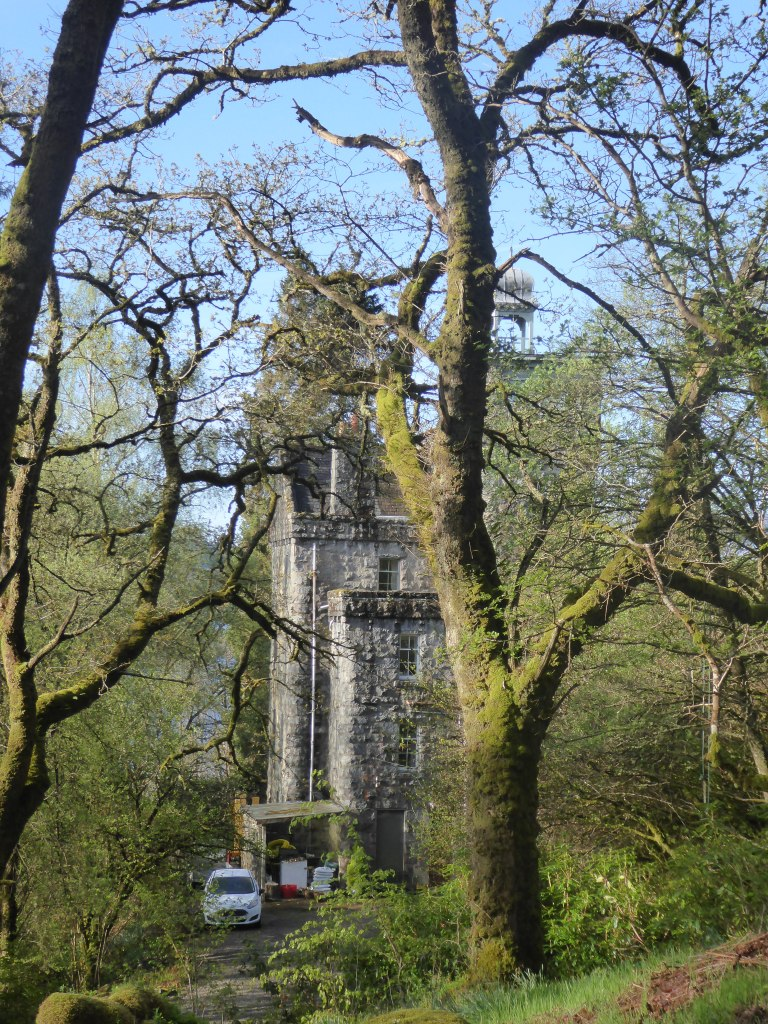

St Conan's Tower is a 19th-century granite-built country house, near Lochawe in Argyll and Bute, Scotland.

Designed and built by architect, author and antiquarian Walter Douglas Campbell, a young brother of Archibald Campbell, 1st Baron Blythswood, St Conan's Tower was intended as a winter home for the family. The granite for the house was quarried from Ben Cruachan, overlooking Loch Awe. The Tower has been used variously since its sale by the Douglas Campbell family in 1924 as a family home, a youth hostel, a bed and breakfast establishment, and then back to a family home plus holiday apartment business. Walter Douglas Campbell also designed St Conan's Kirk and Innis Chonain House. He remained unmarried. His sister, Helen used St Conan's Tower for various house-parties.
