= Chapel of St Fyndoca =

Church in Argyll and Bute, Scotland

Coordinates: 56.3742°N 5.0814°W

The Chapel of St Fyndoca (alternate: Fyndoc, or Findoc) is located on the island of Inishail in Loch Awe, Argyll and Bute, Scotland.

It was the parish church of the parish of Inishail, which included some of the adjacent islands, as well as part of the mainland on each side of the loch. The church is recorded in the mid-13th century, but fell out of use in the 18th century. It is now a ruin, surrounded by a graveyard which contains medieval carved slabs and post-reformation gravestones. The parish is now served by Glenorchy Parish Church at Dalmally. The remains of the chapel and burial ground are protected as a scheduled monument.

== History ==
In the Origines Parochiales Scotiae, the following was noted:

"The year 1257 is marked by the gift of two churches to the abbey. Another son of Malcolm Macnauchtan, Athe by name, with the assent of his brother, Sir Gilbert, knight, gave to the abbot and canons of Inchaffray Abbey the church of St. Findoc of Inchealt, in the Diocese of Argyll, with all tithes, etc., pertaining to the said church. This is the church of Inishail, a parish which included the island of that name in Lochawe, several smaller islands, and land on both sides of the loch. The parish church was in the island. The church remained the possession of the abbey till the Reformation."

The parish church is mentioned by John of Fordun about 1400. In 1529, Archibald Campbell, 4th Earl of Argyll, granted the lands of Barindryane to one Duncan Makcaus, on condition that he and his heirs maintain the chapel of Saint Fyndoc on Inishail, and have masses said for King James V as well as the Earl's own predecessors and successors. In 1556, the grant was confirmed by Queen Mary.

In 1618, Inishail parish was united with Glen Orchy Parish. In 1736, service was discontinued in the 'ruinous chapel' on the island of Inishail, and a church more commodious for the parish was built at Cladich, on the south side of the loch opposite Inishail.

== Grounds ==
On a slight eminence are the fragments of the walls of the small chapel building, enclosing a space choked up with stones and a growth of nettles and other weeds. A larger space is protected by an iron fence. The MacArthur clan has graves here, as well as the 12th Duke of Argyll after his death in April 2001.

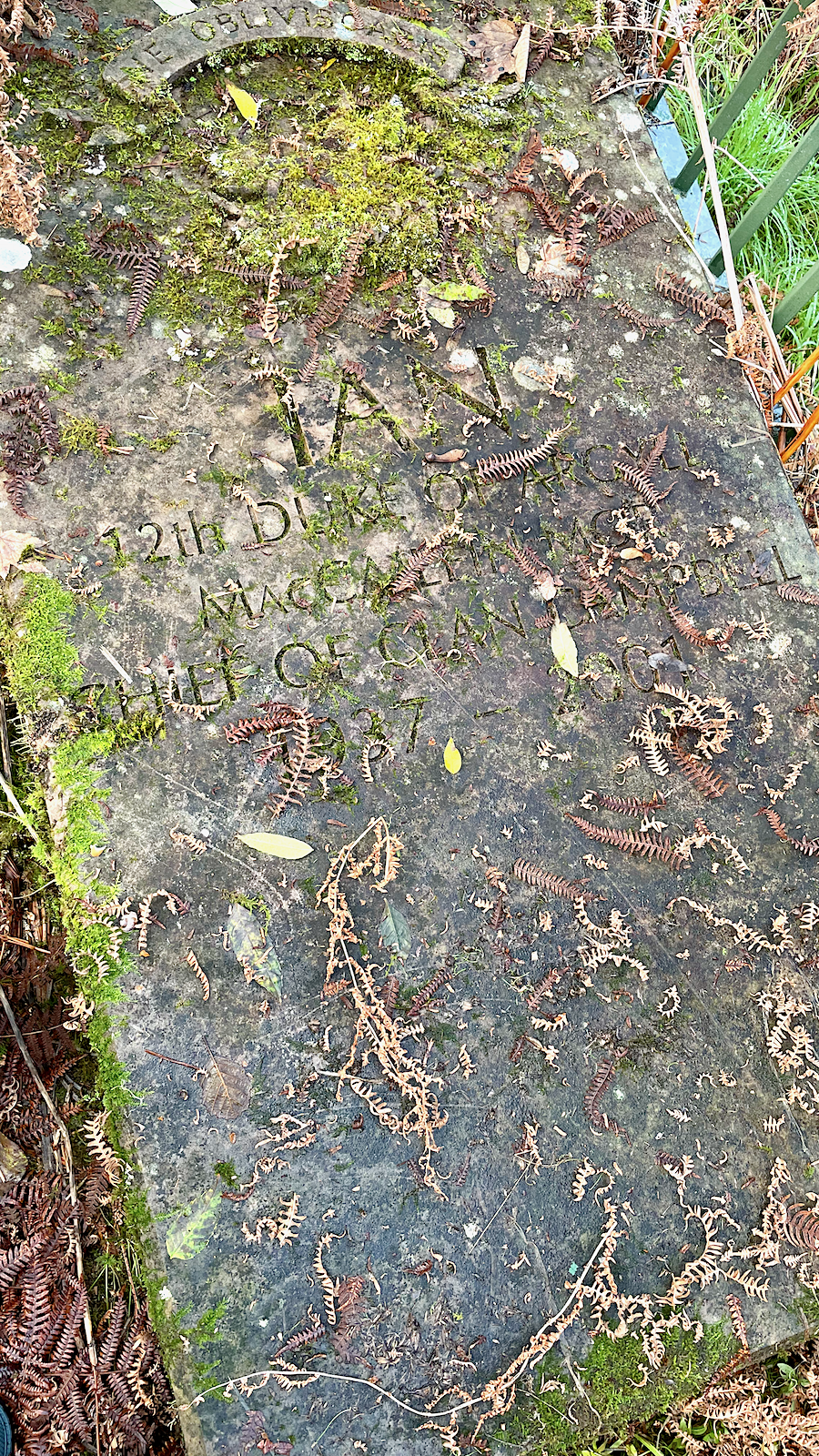
The carved inscription reads: 12th Duke of Argyll MacCAILEIN MOR Chief of Clan Campbell 1937 - 2001

=== Cross ===
About the centre of the area enclosed by the remains of the walls is an early cross carved with a similar design on the other side. The surface is very much weathered, but it does not seem ever to have borne any carving beyond what is shown on my drawing. Exclusive of the base into which it is socketed, it measures 5 feet 3 inches in height, 1 foot 3 inches across the top, and 1 foot 8 inches at the broadest part where the cross occurs. The carving at the parts most highly relieved is about an inch, the sharpest cutting being at the inner edges of the small circles, which are slightly convex on the sunken surface.

=== Stones and slabs ===
Outside of the ruin, but within the fenced enclosure, there are several stones which may be assigned to the 14th and 15th centuries. Some of them are so defaced that only the faintest indications of carving are visible. The one which is perhaps the most notable of these owes its better condition to the deeper cutting. It is now lying flat like a grave-stone, but it probably originally served another purpose, perhaps an altar frontal or door lintel. It has figures of armed men. About the centre is the crucified Saviour, with a figure at his right side holding up a chalice; this figure, though so rudely executed and defaced, is doubtless the personification of the Church receiving the Saviour's blood in the chalice, which was so commonly included among the accessories of the Crucifixion in the Middle Ages. The remainder of the stone is evidently heraldic, showing a shield bearing a one-masted galley, over which is what has probably been meant for a crest, and bearing some faint resemblance to a boar's head. Two armed men appear as supporters. The stone is probably connected with the Campbells of Lochow, which family, at a later date, have for supporters an armed man holding a spear, and a lady holding a missive letter; they bear as their arms a galley with oars in action for Lorn, with a boar's head for crest.

On the left side, after entering by the gate, is a stone, in fairly good condition. It resembles one of those at Kilmartin. It bears, near the top, a man armed with a sword and spear, under which are two animals, their feet rolling away in interlaced foliated ornament. It is 6 feet in length by 22 inches at the top, narrowing slightly downwards.

Close beside this is a slab bearing vestiges of a cross formed of interlaced circles with suggestions of a little foliage—all very much worn away. The shaft, which has been decorated, is 3 inches wide. The stone measures 5 feet 10 inches in length, 22 inches across the top, and 19 inches at the foot, near to which it is broken.
