= Ardchonnell =

Coordinates: 56.25°N 05.26°W

- Location within Argyll and Bute
- OS grid reference: NM9812
- Council area: Argyll and Bute
- Country: Scotland
- Sovereign state: United Kingdom
- Police: Scotland
- Fire: Scottish
- Ambulance: Scottish

Ardchonnell is a settlement on the east shore of Loch Awe in Argyll and Bute, Scotland. To the south-west of Ardchonnel along the loch is Eredine.

There are some 1,294 acres of accessible woodland.

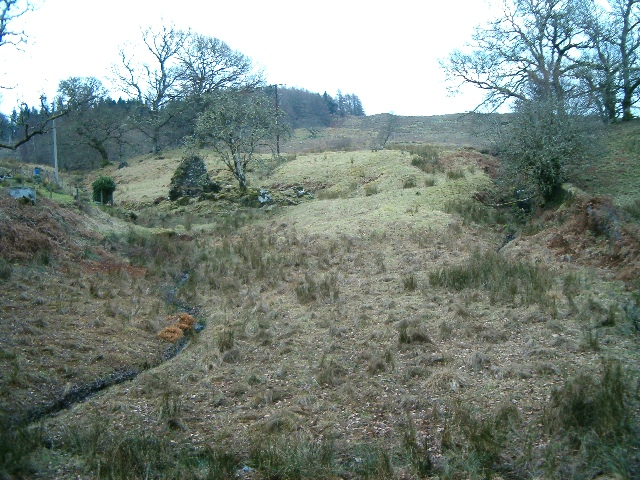
Ruined cottage beside the single-track B840 road north of Ardchonnell
