= Ford, Argyll =

Coordinates: 56.1773867°N 5.430356°W

Ford: Scottish Gaelic: Àth na Crà
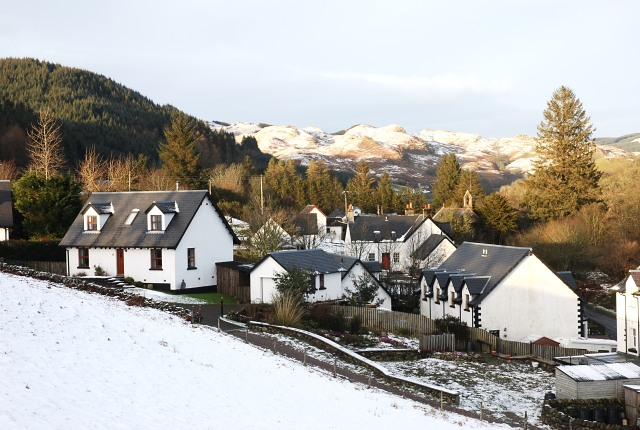
- Ford in 2008

- Location within Argyll and Bute
- OS grid reference: NM868036
- Council area: Argyll and Bute
- Lieutenancy area: Argyll and Bute
- Country: Scotland
- Sovereign state: United Kingdom
- Post town: LOCHGILPHEAD
- Postcode district: PA31
- Police: Scotland
- Fire: Scottish
- Ambulance: Scottish
- UK Parliament: Argyll, Bute and South Lochaber
- Scottish Parliament: Argyll and Bute

Ford (Scottish Gaelic: Àth na Crà) is a small village at the southern end of Loch Awe in Argyll, Scotland. The village originated as a stopping point on the drove route to Inveraray. The Ford Hotel dates back to 1864, and was probably erected on the site of the old change house. Today it is a guest house and is a listed building. To the north-east is Eredine along the loch.

There are historic paddocks along the side of the ford to Dalavich road. A hill known as Dun Dubh overlooks the village.

== Prehistoric remains ==
Many prehistoric structures survive within the village boundary and are all easily accessible or can be seen from the public road. Opposite the guest house, in the village centre, stands a prehistoric burial mound known in Gaelic as Cnoc an Ath (hillock of the ford). It is a cist burial thought to have been opened in the 1800s and the remains of a food vessal found in it is thought to be in the National Museum of Scotland. Several standing stones are scattered around the area, the three most notable ones being the one in the field next to the guest house, the one opposite Glennan Farm, and the largest one at Torran Farm. A crannog is also present in Loch Ederline and is clearly visible from the road.

In 2000, a local bird-watcher discovered a prehistoric urned cremation in a boulder shelter at Glennan. It was excavated by GUARD archaeology and found to contain the remains of probably a male, aged 25–40 years old. They had suffered from slight spinal joint disease, mild iron deficiency anaemia and were cremated shortly after death, together with a young sheep/goat, whose bones were also in the urn.

== Media ==
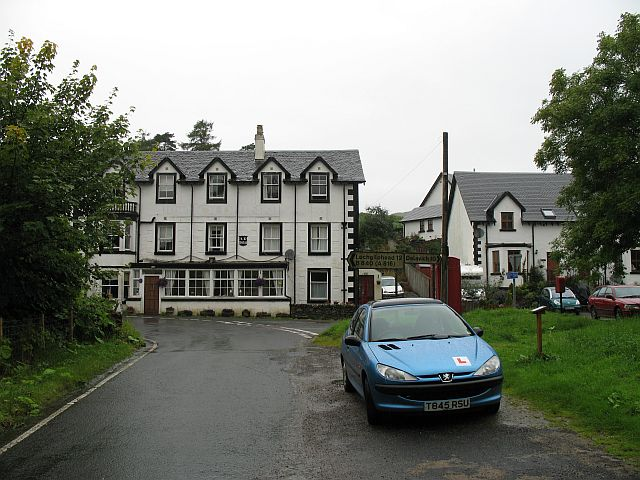
Ford hotel

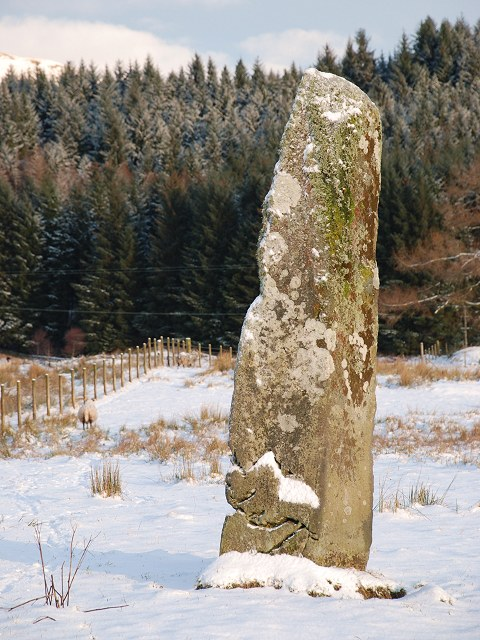
Standing stone in the snow With Ford Wood behind.

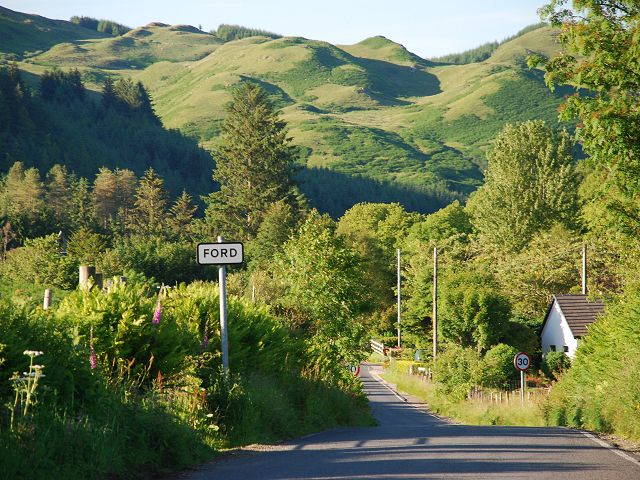
The pedestrian's view approaching Ford from the south along the B840.

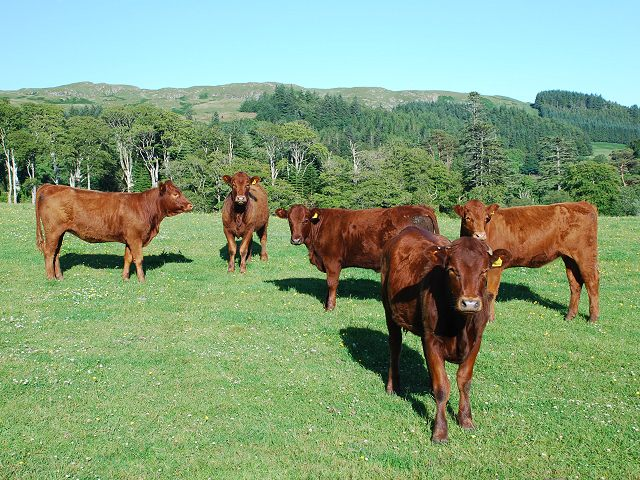
Cattle near Ford

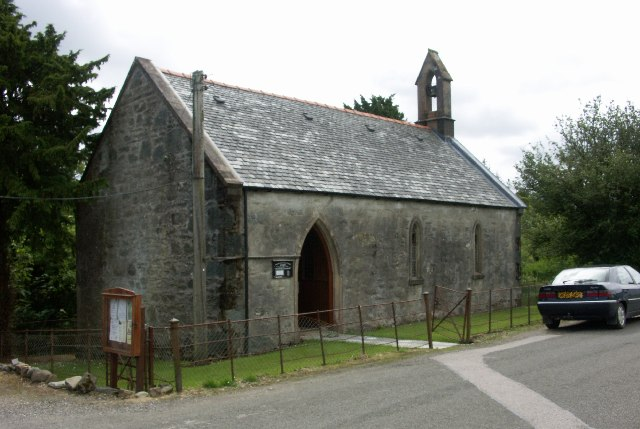
Ford Church

Media related to Ford, Argyll and Bute at Wikimedia Commons
