= HMS Impregnable (1810) =

Ship of the line of the Royal Navy

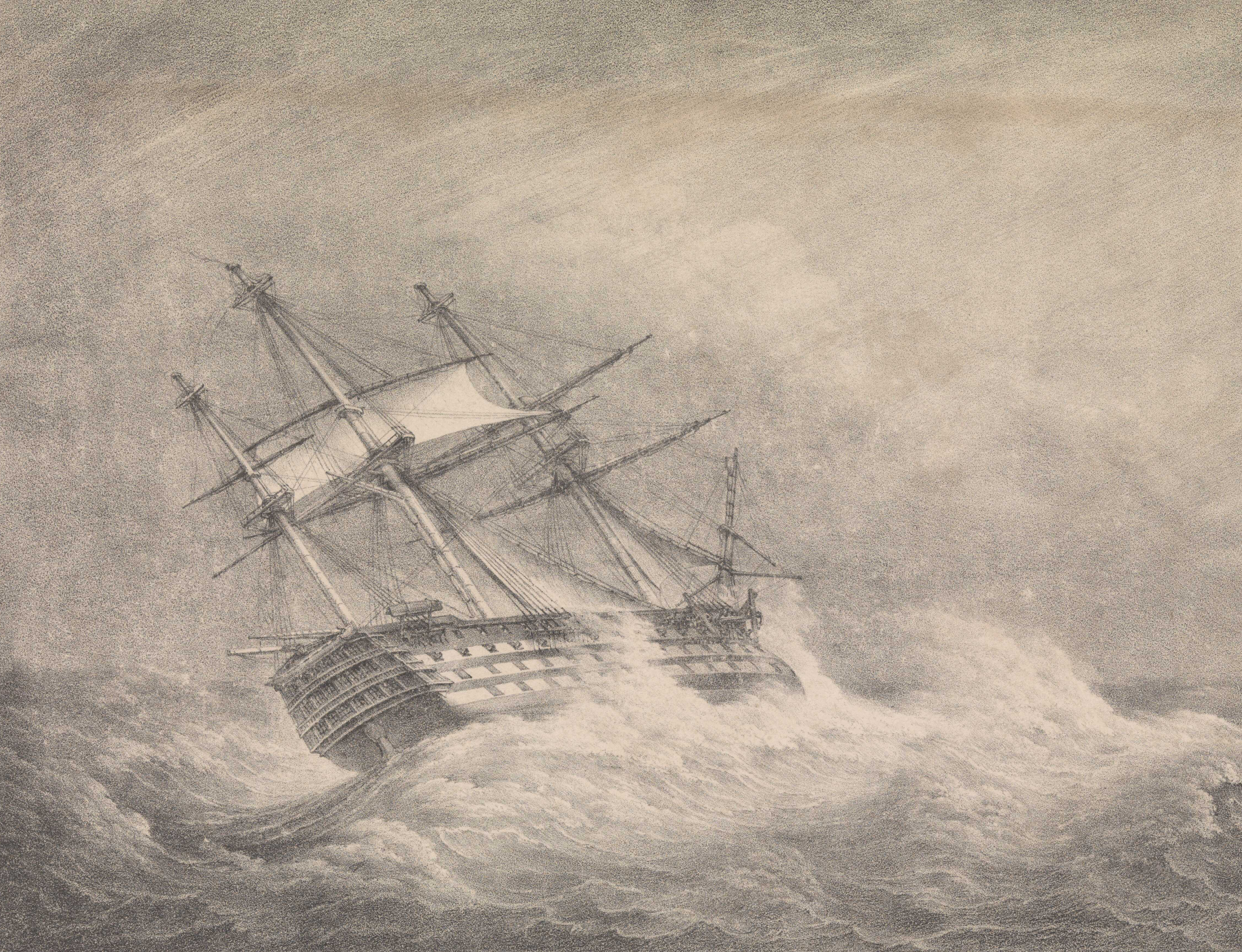
- Impregnable in a gale of wind off Sardinia, 29 October 1841

History

United Kingdom
- Name: HMS Impregnable
- Ordered: 13 January 1798
- Builder: Chatham Dockyard
- Laid down: February 1802
- Launched: 1 August 1810
- Renamed: HMS Kent, HMS Caledonia
- Fate: Sold, 1906

General characteristics
- Class & type: 98-gun second rate ship of the line
- Tons burthen: 2406 bm
- Length: 197 ft (60 m) (gundeck)
- Beam: 51 ft (16 m)
- Depth of hold: 22 ft (6.7 m)
- Propulsion: Sails
- Armament: 98 guns: Gundeck: 28 × 32 pdrs; Middle gundeck: 30 × 18 pdrs; Upper gundeck: 30 × 12 pdrs; Quarterdeck: 8 × 12 pdrs; Forecastle: 2 × 12 pdrs

HMS Impregnable was a 98-gun second-rate ship of the line of the Royal Navy launched on 1 August 1810 at Chatham Dockyard. She was designed by Sir William Rule, and was the only ship built to her draught.

== Career ==
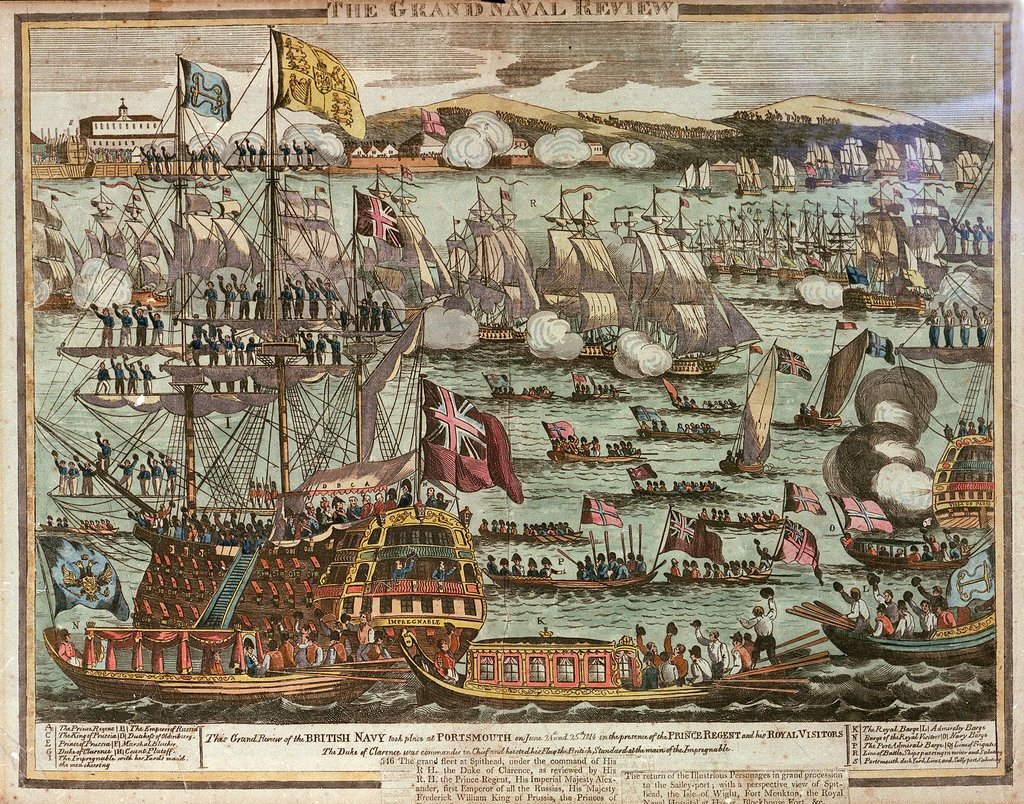
Impregnable at The Grand Naval Review, Spithead, 24-25 June 1814

After the Napoleonic Wars, she was used as the flagship of the Admiral the Duke of Clarence (later King William IV), in order to convey the Tsar of Russia and King of Prussia to Dover on 6 June 1814.

In September 1814, she was paid off at Plymouth, then duly recommissioned, (Note: 'Impregnable was paid off all standing, and has been re-commissioned') to become the flagship of Vice Admiral William Domett, as the postholder of Commander-in-Chief, Plymouth. She remained as the flagship of the postholder of Commander-in-Chief, Plymouth, when Admiral Sir John Duckworth succeeded Domett. In March 1815, Impregnable held a ball to mark the event of the launch of HMS St Vincent at Plymouth. Impregnable departed Plymouth on 19 April 1815, to join the Mediterranean Fleet, under the overall command of Lord Exmouth, with Rear Admiral Josias Rowley aboard. (Note: 'During the summer of 1815 he was again in the Mediterranean with his flag in the Impregnable, under the command of Lord Exmouth, but returned at the end of the war, after the surrender of Napoleon.') His brother Samuel Campbell Rowley commanded Impregnable from 24 March 1815 to December 1815. On 27 May 1815, she arrived at Gibraltar. On 10 July 1815 was moored off Marseille. On 5 October 1815 Impregnable returned to Plymouth. On 18 December 1815 Impregnable was paid off, and recommissioned as the flagship of the Commander-in-Chief, Plymouth.

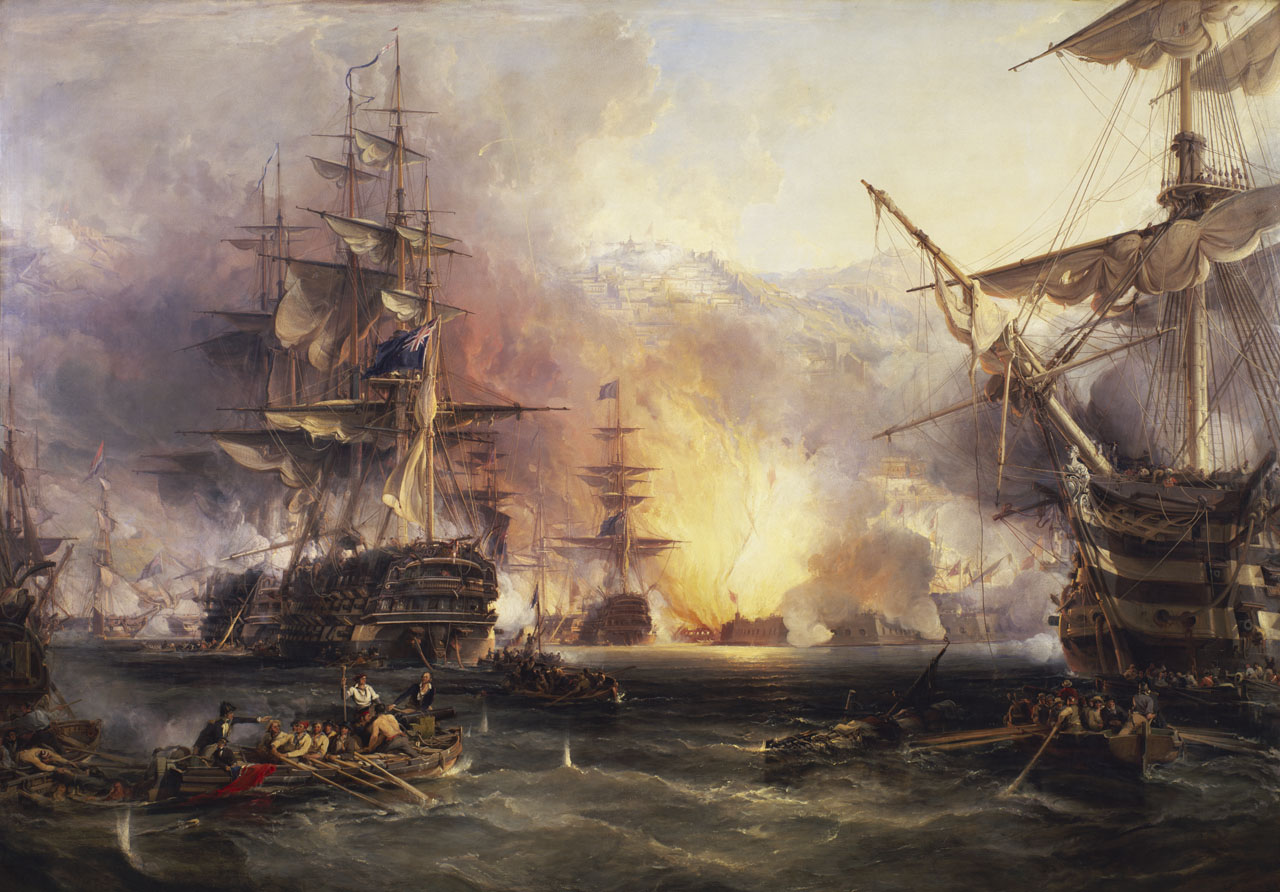
Bombardment of Algiers, 27 August 1816, by George Chambers (painter); The bow of Impregnable is visible at the right front

In July 1816, Captain Edward Brace took command of Impregnable That same month, Impregnable was prepared to deploy to the Barbary coast. (Note: 'The Impregnable, Superb, and Belzebub bomb, are equipping at Plymouth, where the greatest bustle prevails to procure from the different departments large quantities of ordnance stores, additional boats, cables, and anchors... every exertion is making to get them ready by the 10th... The Impregnable is to have 18-pounders on her upper deck instead of her 12-pounders, which are ordered on shore.') On 25 July 1816, Impregnable departed Plymouth as a part of a fleet comprising 19 vessels. Rear-Admiral David Milne embarked, to join the expedition, as second in command. Impregnable participated in the Bombardment of Algiers on 27 August 1816, where she was second in the order of battle. In the attack on Algiers, Impregnable, isolated from the other ships, was a large and tempting target. Attracting attention from the Algerian gunners who raked her fore and aft, she was severely damaged. 268 shots hit the hull, and the main mast was damaged in 15 places. Impregnable lost Mr. John Hawkins, midshipman, 37 seamen, 10 marines and 2 boys killed and Mr. G. N. Wesley, Mr. Henry Quinn, 111 seamen, 21 marines, 9 sappers and miners and 17 boys wounded.

On 22 October 1816, James Nash resumed command from Brace, having previously been appointed on 8 December 1815. The Impregnable saw little further action, apart from a short commission in the Mediterranean, and in 1819 she was placed in the Reserve Fleet at Devonport. From May 1839 to October 1841 she had relieved HMS Royal Adelaide as the Commander-in-Chief's flagship moored at the entrance to the Hamoaze. She then saw service again in the Mediterranean until May 1843, when she was once again laid up with the reserve fleet at Devonport.

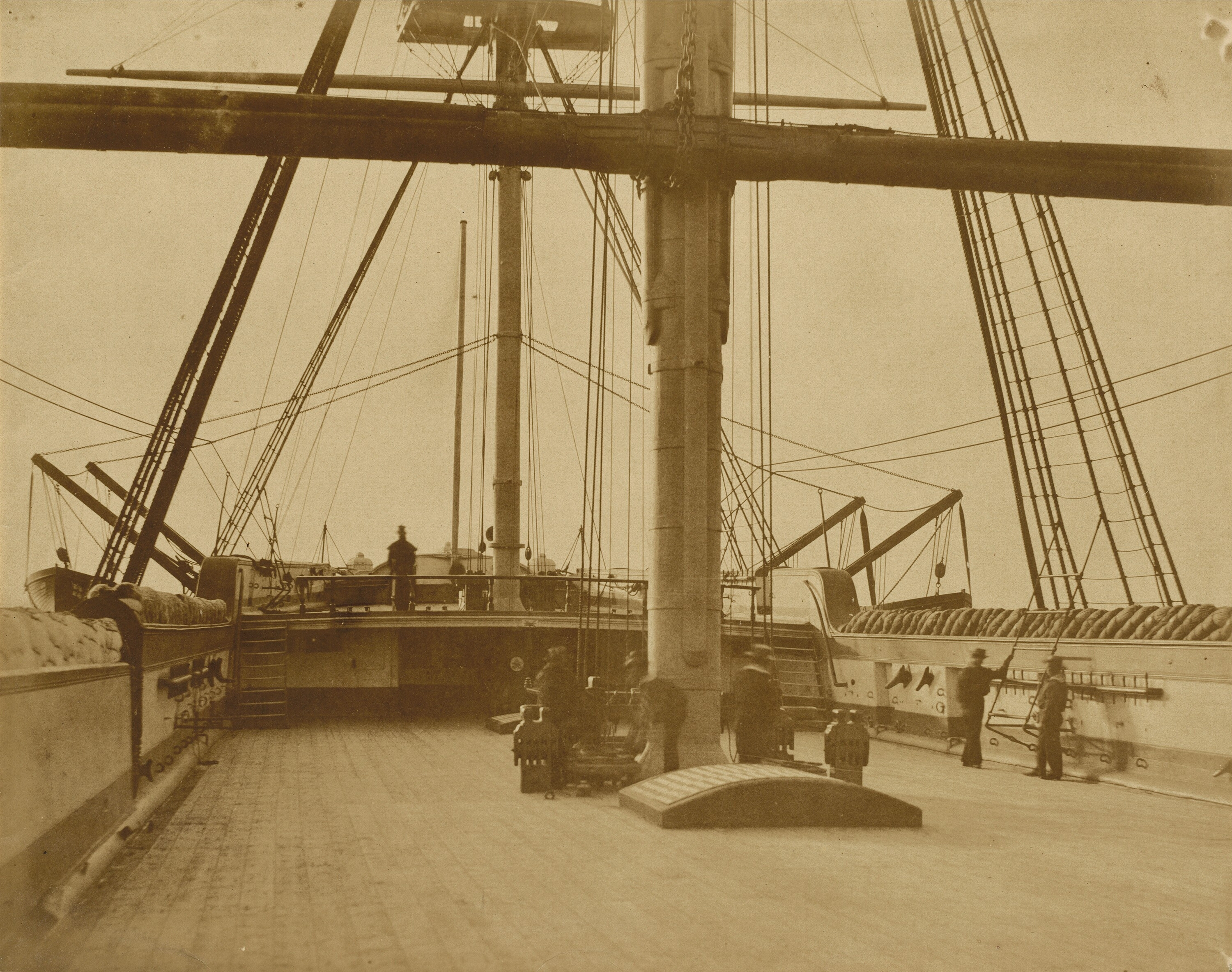
Quarterdeck of HMS Impregnable circa 1853

Impregnable was rated as a training ship in 1862 and removed from the reserve fleet to begin service at Devonport training boy seamen for the Royal Navy.

On 27 September 1886, Impregnable was replaced by HMS Howe which was renamed HMS Bulwark as she became a training ship. The old Impregnable ended her days first as a tender to HMS Indus and then on 9 November 1888 she was renamed HMS Kent to be used as a hulk in the event of an epidemic. On that date, her name, Impregnable, was given to HMS Bulwark (the former HMS Howe), still serving at Devonport. Three years later on 22 September 1891, she was once again re-named, this time HMS Caledonia, and became a Scottish boys training / school ship moored at Queensferry in the Firth of Forth.

H.M.S. " IMPREGNABLE." in Plymouth, Devon, ca. 1898

As HMS Caledonia, she was to spend the next 15 years at anchor in the Firth of Forth as a training ship for boys. The ship was divided up for training by decks: The Upper Deck was used exclusively for sail drill, gunnery and recreation. The Main and Middle decks were used for seamanship classes and instruction. The Lower and Orlop decks were devoted to living and sleeping spaces. The training ship accommodated 190 Officers and men as well as 800 boys. Instruction covered boat pulling, sailing & gunnery. It was hoped that this form of training would instil in the boys the qualities of resourcefulness, courage and self-reliance. Theoretical instruction was undertaken in the 'Schoolroom'. This room could accommodate 200 boys at once and often did. The 200 boys were broken down into classes of 15 – 20. Commander the Hon. Robert Francis Boyle was in command from August 1901.

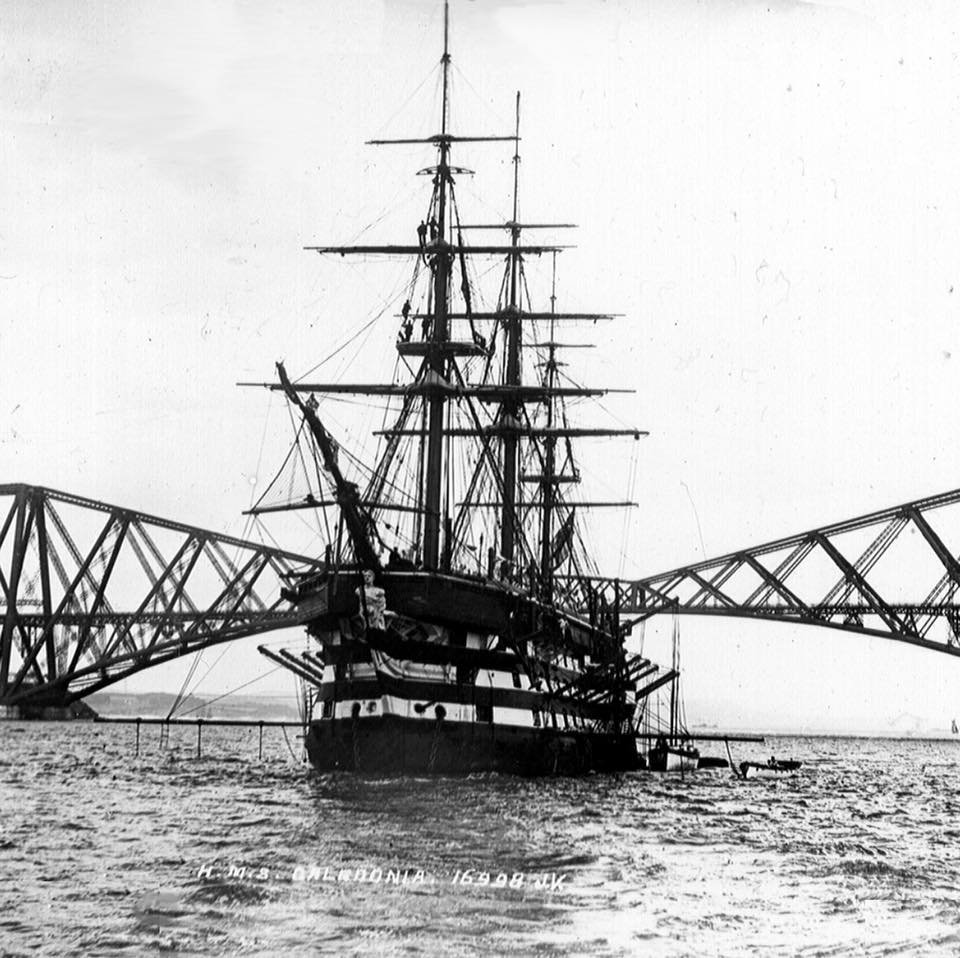
Impregnable in her new role in 1898 as HMS Caledonia in the Firth of Forth

She was sold for breaking up in 1906. The heavy oak beams of the cloister of St Conan’s Kirk were made from Caledonia and HMS Duke of Wellington. The church is situated by the side of Loch Awe.

Beginning with HMS Bulwark in 1886 until Impregnable moved ashore in 1936 and becoming a stone frigate in the process, every subsequent vessel that served in this ship's stead as a school ship at Devonport had been renamed Impregnable in her honour. The training school eventually closed in 1948.
