= HMS Olympus (S12) =

Submarine of the Royal Navy

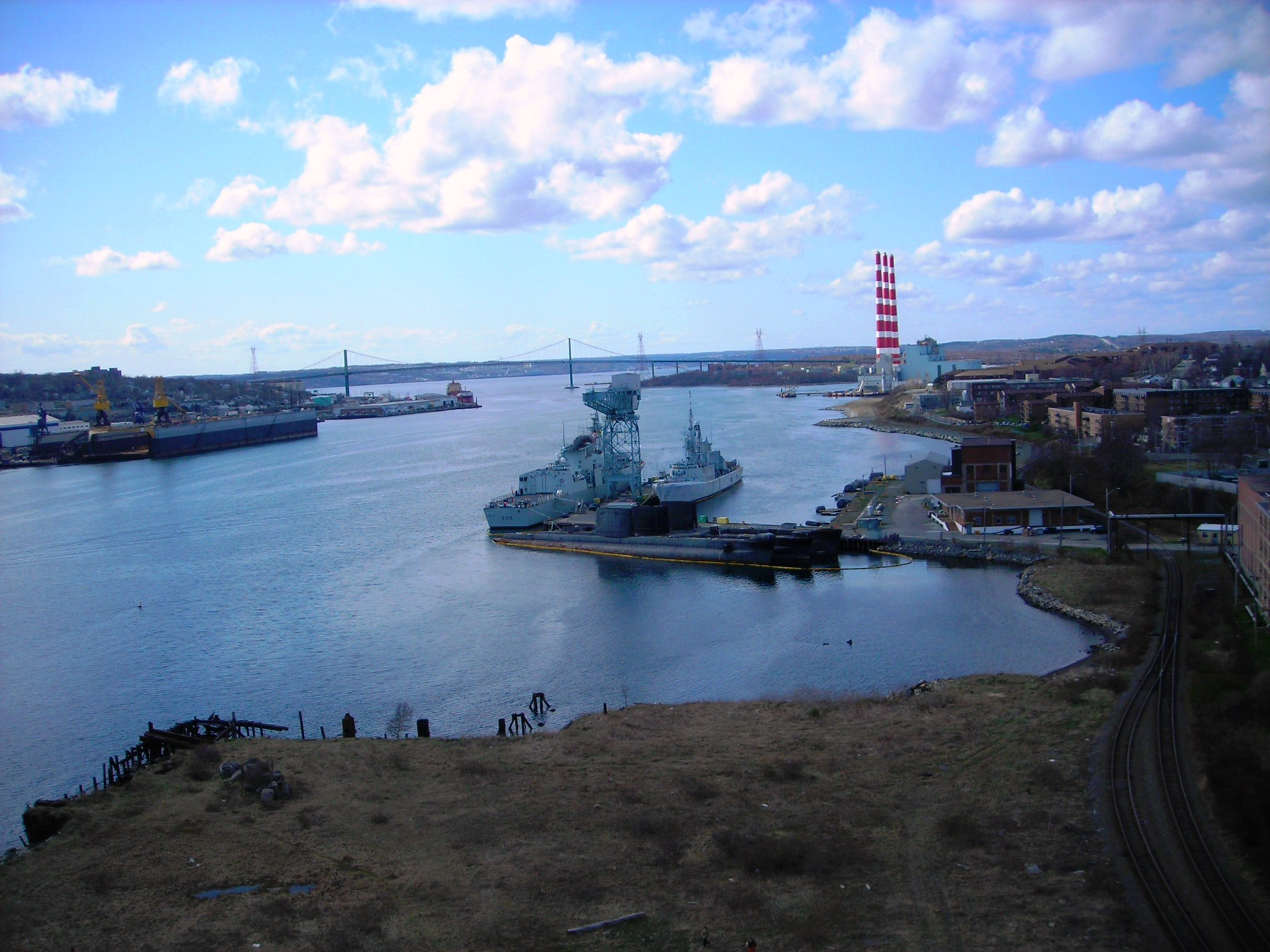
- HMCS Ojibwa, HMCS Okanagan and ex-HMS Olympus docked in Halifax

History

United Kingdom
- Name: Olympus
- Namesake: Mount Olympus
- Builder: Vickers-Armstrongs, Barrow-in-Furness
- Laid down: 4 March 1960
- Launched: 14 June 1961
- Commissioned: 7 July 1962
- Decommissioned: 1980s
- Identification: Pennant number: S12
- Fate: Sold to Canadian Forces as training vessel
- Badge: Blazon Azure with thunderbolts of Zeus

Canada
- Acquired: 1989
- In service: 1989
- Out of service: 27 April 2000
- Fate: Scrapped in 2011

General characteristics as designed
- Class & type: Oberon-class submarine
- Displacement: 1,610 tons standard; 2,030 tons full load surfaced; 2,410 tons full load submerged
- Length: 241 feet (73 m) between perpendiculars; 295.2 feet (90.0 m) length overall
- Beam: 26.5 feet (8.1 m)
- Draught: 18 feet (5.5 m)
- Propulsion: 2 × Admiralty Standard Range 16 VMS diesel generators; 2 × 3,000 shaft horsepower (2,200 kW) electric motors; 2 shafts
- Speed: 17 knots (31 km/h; 20 mph) submerged; 12 knots (22 km/h; 14 mph) surfaced
- Complement: 68
- Sensors & processing systems: Type 186 and Type 187 sonars; I-band surface search radar
- Armament: 8 × 21-inch (533 mm) torpedo tubes (6 forward, 2 aft); 24 torpedoes

HMS Olympus was an Oberon-class submarine that served in the Royal Navy, and later in the Canadian Forces as a submarine trainer.

== Design and construction ==
The Oberon class was a direct follow on of the Porpoise class, with the same dimensions and external design, but updates to equipment and internal fittings, and a higher grade of steel used for fabrication of the pressure hull. and constructed from a better grade of steel. These build differences allowed the Oberons to have a deeper diving depth at roughly 1,000 feet (300 m).

As designed for British service, the Oberon-class submarines were 241 feet (73 m) in length between perpendiculars and 295.2 feet (90.0 m) in length overall, with a beam of 26.5 feet (8.1 m), and a draught of 18 feet (5.5 m). Displacement was 1,610 tonnes (1,580 long tons) standard, 2,030 tonnes (2,000 long tons) full load when surfaced, and 2,410 tonnes (2,370 long tons) full load when submerged. Propulsion machinery consisted of 2 Admiralty Standard Range 16 VMS diesel generators, and two 3,000 shaft horsepower (2,200 kW) electric motors, each driving a 7-foot-diameter (2.1 m), 3-bladed propeller at up to 400 rpm. Top speed was 17 knots (31 km/h; 20 mph) when submerged, and 12 knots (22 km/h; 14 mph) on the surface. Eight 21-inch (533 mm) diameter torpedo tubes were fitted (six facing forward, two aft), with a total payload of 24 torpedoes. The boats were fitted with Type 186 and Type 187 sonars, and an I-band surface search radar. The standard complement was 68: 6 officers, 62 sailors.

== Construction and career ==
Olympus was laid down by Vickers-Armstrongs on 4 March 1960, and launched on 14 June 1961. The boat was commissioned into the Royal Navy on 7 July 1962. In September 1967 Olympus was among the vessels sent in search of a downed French Navy Breguet Atlantic which had been operating out of RAF Kinloss.

In November 1969 she fired a practice torpedo in Loch Long which nearly sank MV Countess of Breadalbane. The near miss had been caused by a fault in the torpedo itself which changed course unexpectedly.

In April 1982, Olympus departed HMNB Devonport. It was believed at the time that she was deployed to the South Atlantic during the Falklands War. In fact, for the duration of the Falklands Conflict Olympus took in NATO exercises off the coast of Scotland.

Olympus completed a two year refit at Devonport in July 1982, being fitted with a new Aluminum Fin and a 5-man swim-out chamber to aid submerged exit and entry of special forces swimmers. Following the refit, she joined the First Submarine Flotilla based at Gosport. In 1986, Olympus appeared in the popular UK Channel 4 television game show Treasure Hunt. After rendezvousing with the submarine a few miles out of Plymouth Sound, presenter Anneka Rice watched on from the show's helicopter as Olympus surfaced, before landing on her hull and receiving the episode's second clue from the vessel's captain, Lt. Cmdr. John Tuckett.

Retired from the Royal Navy, Olympus was sold to the Canadian Forces in 1989 and was stationed as a non-operational training boat in Halifax, Nova Scotia. The ship was never commissioned into Canadian service and was turned over to Crown Assets for disposal on 27 April 2000.

In May 2005, the Halifax Chronicle-Herald announced that Maritime Command (MARCOM) was looking to sell Olympus and three other Canadian Oberons for scrap metal. MARCOM stated that the submarines were not in suitable condition to be used as museum ships (despite an appeal launched in 2002 to return her for display to her Barrow-in-Furness birthplace), and predicted that each submarine would sell for between C$50,000 and C$60,000.

In July 2011, Olympus started making her journey from Halifax to a scrapyard (International Marine Salvage) in Port Maitland, Ontario. The submarine arrived on 28 July for scrapping.

== Publications ==
- Brown, David K.; Moore, George (2012). Rebuilding the Royal Navy: Warship Design since 1945. Barnsley, United Kingdom: Seaforth Publishing. ISBN 978-184832-150-2.
- Cocker, Maurice (2008). Royal Navy Submarines: 1901 to the Present Day. Barnsley, United Kingdom: Pen and Sword Books Ltd. ISBN 978-1-84415-733-4.
- Colledge, J. J.; Warlow, Ben (2006) [1969]. Ships of the Royal Navy: The Complete Record of All Fighting Ships of the Royal Navy from the 15th Century to the Present (3rd Rev ed.). London: Chatham Publishing. ISBN 978-1-86176-281-8. OCLC 67375475.
- Couhat, Jean Labayle; Baker, A. D., eds. (1986). Combat Fleets of the World 1986/87. Annapolis, Maryland, USA: Naval Institute Press. ISBN 0-85368-860-5.
- Ferguson, Julie H. (1995). Through a Canadian Periscope: The Story of the Canadian Submarine Service. Toronto: Dundurn Press. ISBN 1-55002-217-2.
- Gardiner, Robert; Chumbley, Stephen; Budzbon, Przemysław, eds. (1995). Conway's All the World's Fighting Ships 1947–1995. Annapolis, Maryland: Naval Institute Press. ISBN 1-55750-132-7.
- Macpherson, Ken; Barrie, Ron (2002). The Ships of Canada's Naval Forces 1910–2002 (Third ed.). St. Catharines, Ontario: Vanwell Publishing. ISBN 1-55125-072-1.
- Moore, John, ed. (1977). Jane's Fighting Ships 1977–78. Jane's Fighting Ships (80th ed.). London: Jane's Yearbooks. ISBN 0531032779. OCLC 18207174.
