= Braevallich =

Coordinates: 56.21°N 05.30°W

- Location within Argyll and Bute
- OS grid reference: NM9507
- Council area: Argyll and Bute
- Country: Scotland
- Sovereign state: United Kingdom
- Police: Scotland
- Fire: Scottish
- Ambulance: Scottish

Braevallich is a settlement and farm in Argyll and Bute, Scotland near Loch Awe.

Braevallich farm has an aquaculture site beside the loch.
