= Kilchrenan =

Coordinates: 56.35673°N 5.17729°W

Kilchrenan: Scottish Gaelic: Cill Chrèanain
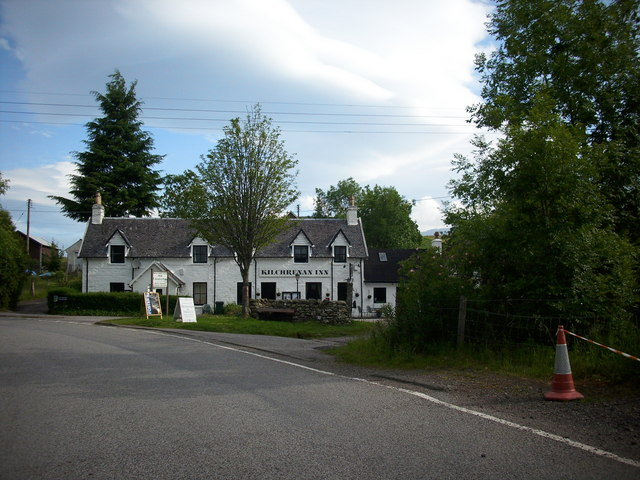
- Kilchrenan Inn dominates the heart of the village

- Location within Argyll and Bute
- OS grid reference: NN038227
- Council area: Argyll and Bute
- Lieutenancy area: Argyll and Bute
- Country: Scotland
- Sovereign state: United Kingdom
- Post town: TAYNUILT
- Postcode district: PA35
- Police: Scotland
- Fire: Scottish
- Ambulance: Scottish
- UK Parliament: Argyll, Bute and South Lochaber
- Scottish Parliament: Argyll and Bute

Kilchrenan (Scottish Gaelic: Cill Chrèanain) is a small village in the Argyll and Bute area of Scotland. Kilchrenan is located near to the end of the B845 road, about 1 mile (1.6 km) inland from Loch Awe. It forms part of the area of Avich and Kilchrenan Community Council.

The tomb of Colin More Campbell of Lochawe, who was killed at the Battle of Red Ford in 1294, can be seen in the churchyard of Kilchrenan. It is described as “a narrow old tomb with sculpture much defaced.”

== See also ==
- Annat
