= Innis Chonain =

Island in Loch Awe, Scottish Highlands

Innis Chonain (Gaelic)
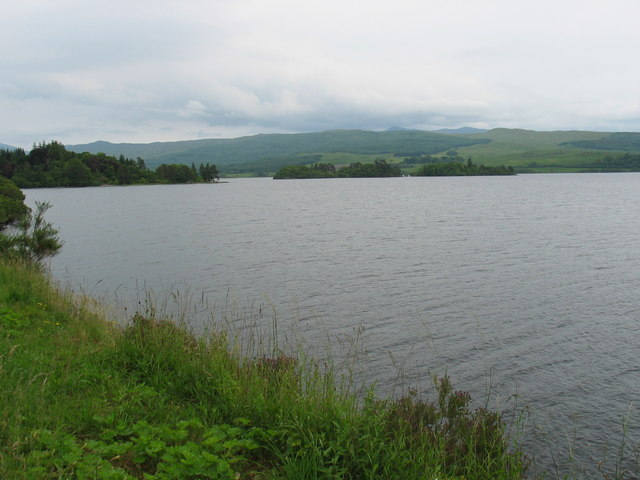
- Loch Awe showing some of the islands in the loch, including Innis Chonain

Location
- Innis Chonain shown within Argyll and Bute
- OS grid reference: NN107258
- Coordinates: 56.39°N 5.07°W

Name
- Name meaning: Island of St Conan

Physical geography
- Island group: Loch Awe
- Area: 8 ha (20 acres)
- Highest elevation: 62 m (203 ft)

Administration
- Council area: Argyll and Bute
- Country: Scotland
- Sovereign state: United Kingdom

Demographics
- Population: 2
- Population rank: 88= (Freshwater: 3)

Innis Chonain or Innischonan is an island in Loch Awe, Scotland connected to the mainland by a bridge.

Architect, author and antiquarian Walter Douglas Campbell, a young brother of Archibald Campbell, 1st Baron Blythswood, purchased the island in the second half of the 19th century. He designed and built Innis Chonain House and also nearby St Conan's Tower for himself, his artist sister Helen and their mother the elderly Mrs Caroline Campbell of Blythswood House near Glasgow. Walter delighted in building unusual properties, including St Conan’s Kirk, which is on the mainland nearby, an eclectic blend of church styles.
