= Glenorchy Parish Church =

Coordinates: 56.4041°N 4.9710°W

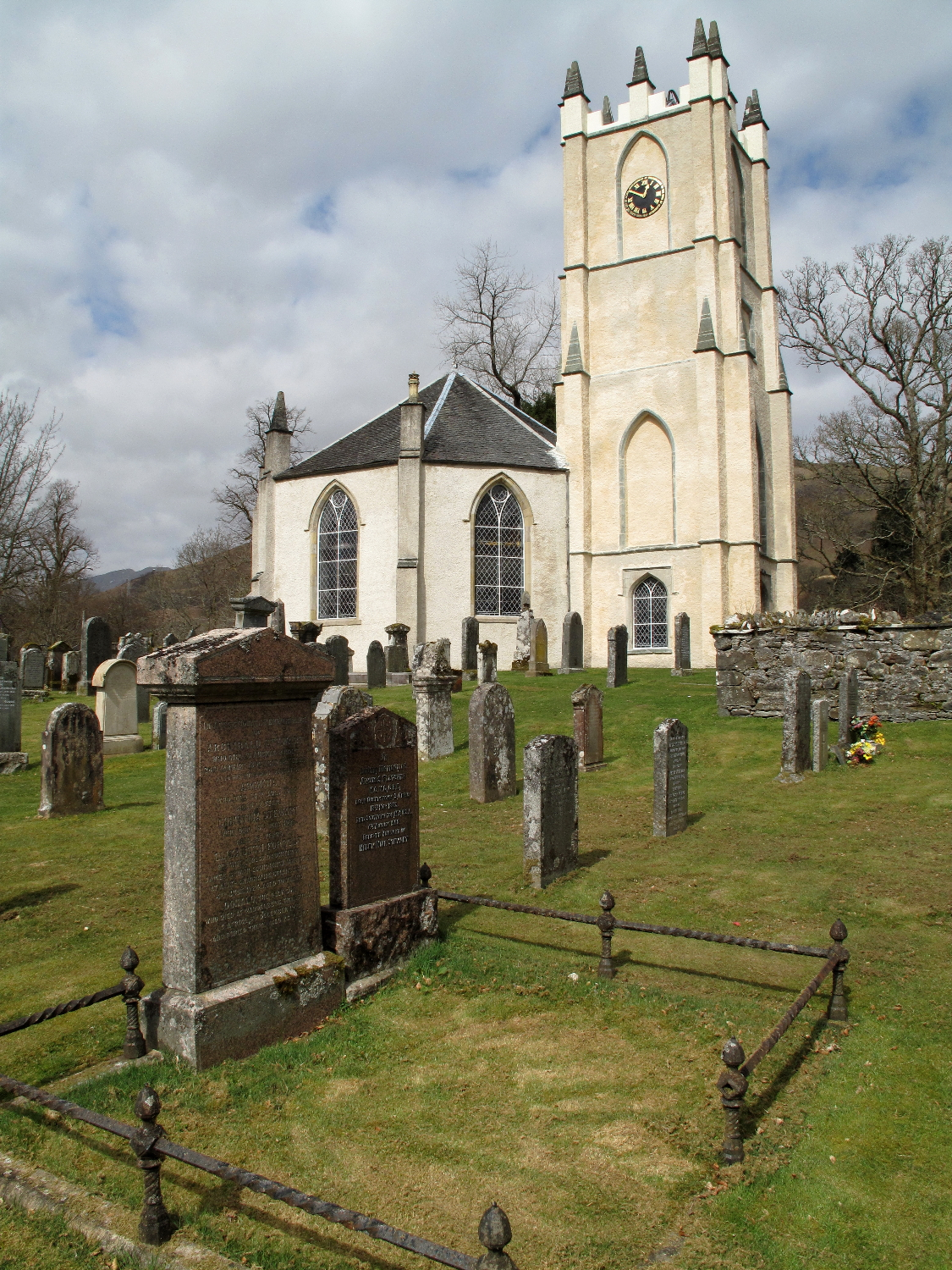
- Glenorchy Parish Church and Graveyard

- The church within Argyll and Bute
- Location: Dalmally
- Country: Scotland
- Denomination: Church of Scotland
- Website: www.glenorchyparish.org.uk

History
- Status: Parish church

Architecture
- Functional status: Active
- Heritage designation: Category A listed building
- Designated: 20 July 1971
- Architect: James Elliot
- Style: Gothic Revival
- Completed: 1811

Glenorchy Parish Church is a congregation of the Church of Scotland in the village of Dalmally, Argyll and Bute, Scotland. It is the parish church of the parish of Glenorchy and Inishail. The church is also known as Glenorchy Kirk, and was historically known as the Church of Dysart (Scottish Gaelic: Clachan Diseart). There have been many alternate spellings, including "Dysert", "Disart", "Glenwrquha", "Glenvrquha", "Glenvrquhay", "Clachandysert", "Clachan Disert, "Claghan-Diseirt" and "Dysart and Glenurquhie".

The octagonal church building dates from the early 19th century. It is protected as a Category A listed building, and is also notable for its burial ground and grave slabs. The old churchyard which surrounds the parish church contains some ancient gravestones of the clan, and the gallows-hill of Glenorchy is famed in Highland tradition as a place of execution.

== Geography ==
The church was built upon an islet formed by the River Orchy. It is situated within Dalmally in western Scotland, which is near the A85 road and is served by Dalmally railway station. Opposite the church is the Gallow Hill of Glenorchy, which is reputed in Highland tradition to have been the location of summary executions when the Macgregors controlled the region. Near the church is the well of Saint Conan, known locally as a holy well.

=== Glenorchy parish ===
The parish of Glenorchy lies between Perthshire to the east, and Lochawe and Loch Etive to the west. It was formed in 1618 when the parishes of Glenorchy and Inishail were united. The two parishes were subsequently separated in 1660, but were reunited by the Rescissory Act 1661. The principal valleys in Glenorchy parish are Glenstrae, Glen Orchy and Glen Lochay. Near the centre of the parish is Loch Tulla, with Loch Lydon to the north and Loch Awe to the south.

== History ==
The church is recorded in 1390, with mention of the mountain chief, Iain Macgregor of Glenorchy (d. 1390), 2nd Chief of Clan Gregor, who was reported to have been buried on the north side of the High Altar in Dysart, at the old Church of Glenorchy. Records from 1449, 1498, and 1523 mention the church or the parish. In 1854, Anderson et al. stated that in the early 16th century the church "seems to have had" an altar called the High Altar of Glensthray (Glenstrae). In 1586, the church was described as being "on a certain island naturally formed and surrounded by the water of Vrquhay". In 1614, Sir Duncan Campbell of Glenvrquhay paid for a nineteen-year lease for the church. In 1616, he paid another sum for the use of the church's parsonage and vicarage. In 1629, N. Cameroune was vicar of Dysart. Eight years later, Archibald Campbell of Kilmun assigned to Archibald Lord Lorne a lease of Dysart in Glenurchay, which had been granted him by Duncan Campbell, provost of Kilmun. According to Pennant in 1769, the church was described as being situated on a large isle formed by the river.

The present church was constructed in 1811. It was designed by James Elliot of Edinburgh; in 1860, the older church was still standing in the vicinity of the newer one. Although it was 15 miles (24 km) away, it was the closest church to Duncan Ban MacIntyre, the Scottish Gaelic poet.

== Church building ==
The octagonal church building is of Gothic design. It is finished with an eight-sided pyramidal slate roof and adjoined by a square Gothic tower. Several of the church's pointed windows were restored in 2008.

== Grounds ==
The churchyard was the burying place of the Macgregors. Also in the church's burial ground are late medieval grave slabs that are embellished with figures of armed warriors and emblematical devices that are said to have been brought from Inishail.
