= St Conan's Kirk =

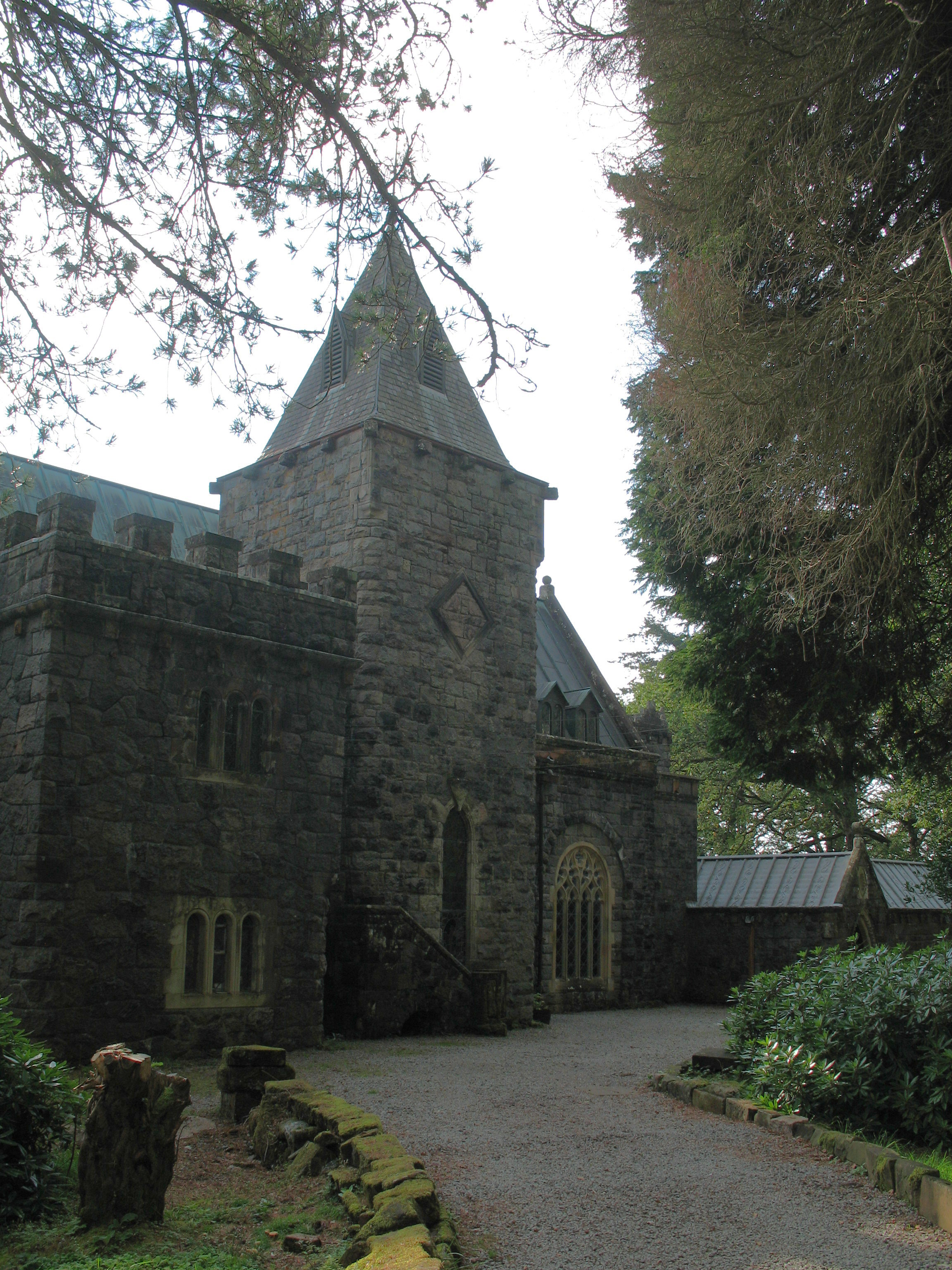
- St Conan's Kirk (view from road)

- Shown within Argyll
- 56°23′43″N 05°03′15″W
- Location: Argyll and Bute
- Country: Scotland
- Website: www.stconanskirk.org.uk

History
- Status: Chapel

Architecture
- Functional status: Active
- Heritage designation: Category A
- Architect: Walter Douglas Campbell

Listed Building – Category A
- Designated: 20/07/1971
- Reference no.: LB4700

St Conan's Kirk is located in the village of Loch Awe in Argyll and Bute, Scotland. In a 2016 Royal Incorporation of Architects in Scotland public poll it was voted one of the Top 10 buildings in Scotland of the last 100 years. It was established as a chapel of ease by the Campbells of Innis Chonan. The church is protected as a category A listed building.

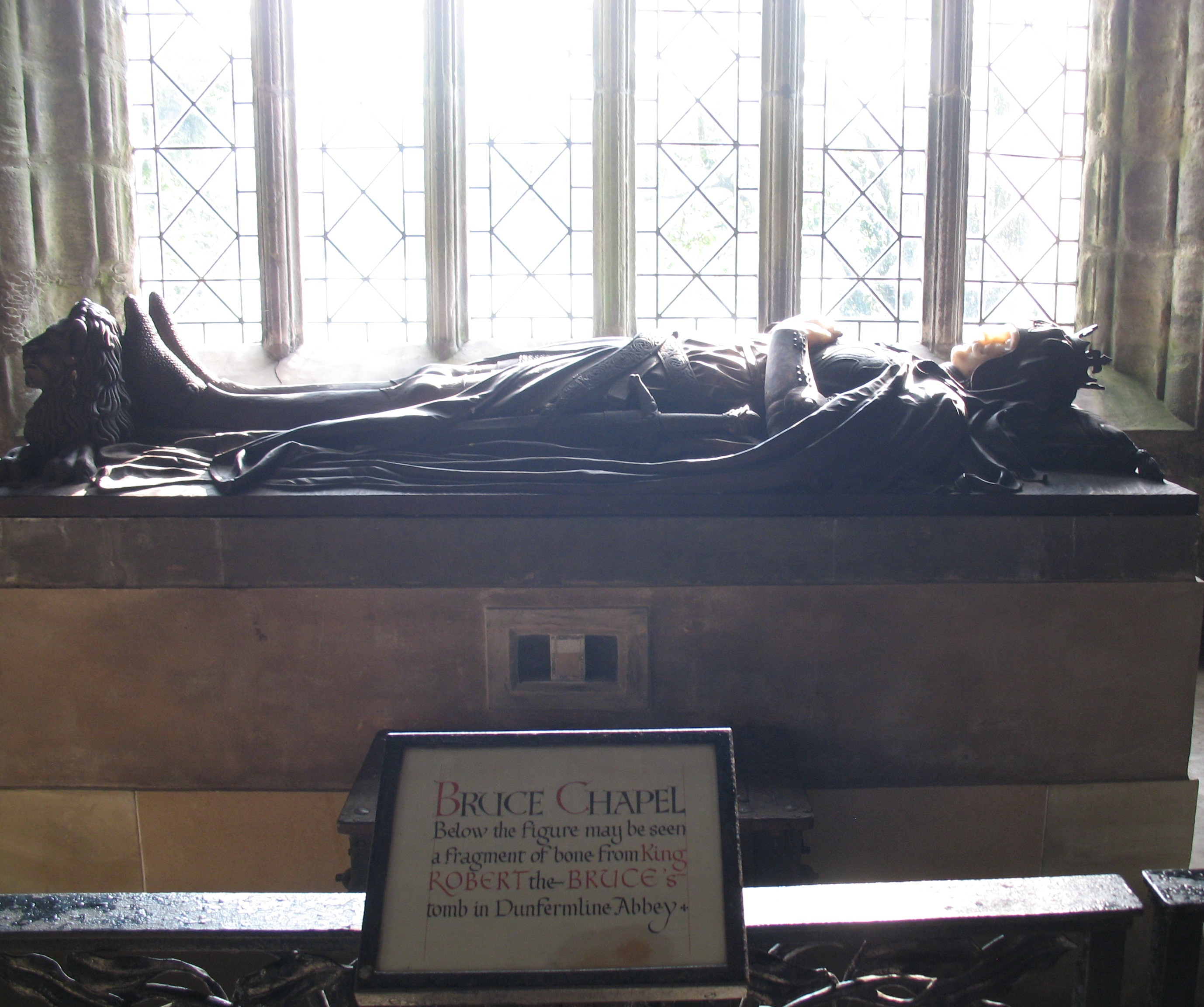
Robert the Bruce Chapel

== Architecture and fittings ==
It was designed by the architect Walter Douglas Campbell, a younger brother of Archibald Campbell, 1st Baron Blythswood. It was built in 1881–6; and substantially extended from 1906 to 1914, the year of his death. Campbell also designed in similar style the family mansion nearby on Innis Chonain for himself, his artist sister Helen and mother, the elderly Mrs Caroline Campbell of Blythswood, formerly resident in Blythswood House downriver from Glasgow. The heavy oak beams in the cloister are believed to have come from the (then) recently broken up wooden battleships, HMS Caledonia and HMS Duke of Wellington. An eclectic blend of church styles, from ancient Roman to Norman, it is built of local stone. It consists of a nave and chancel, with the chancel-stalls being canopied. Large, unsmoothed boulders of granite from nearby Ben Cruachan, form the piers which carry the chancel arch, and the transepts make the Sacred Cross. There is also a tower and spire. Walter was unmarried and left no heirs. His sister Helen Douglas Campbell ensured that final work was in progress by 1927, the year of her death. The Kirk was consecrated in 1930.

Fittings included a small organ. One ancient window from South Leith Parish Church was re-used at St Conan's. It also houses a fragment of bone that is said to have come from Robert the Bruce, King of Scotland.

=== Chapels ===
There are also three chapels within St Conan's Kirk. The Bruce Chapel contains a carved wood and alabaster effigy of Robert the Bruce. The St Brides Chapel contains a carved effigy of Walter Douglas Campbell. The St Conval's Chapel is dedicated to the 4th Lord Blythswood. The metalwork gates on the St Brides and St Conval's Chapel were made by Thomas Hadden.

== Ownership ==
Although used for services by the local Church of Scotland Parish, with services on the first Sunday of each month the Kirk was bequeathed to the independent St Conan's Church Trust (SC012643). In 2014 a friends organisation, Friends of St Conan's Kirk SCIO (SC045006) was formed to support the Kirk.

== Related buildings ==
St Conan's Tower is 0.5 miles (0.80 km) away. Other related buildings in the area of Lochawe village include Innis Chonain House, Badnaiska (Summer Manse) and the House of Letterawe, the former home of the author Mary Stewart (novelist).

== Gallery ==
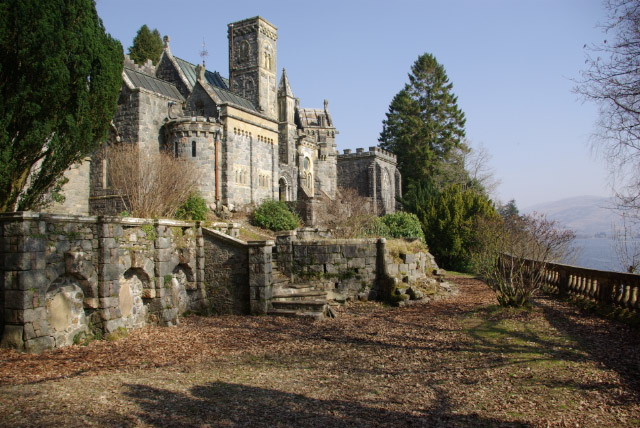
Exterior view facing Loch Awe

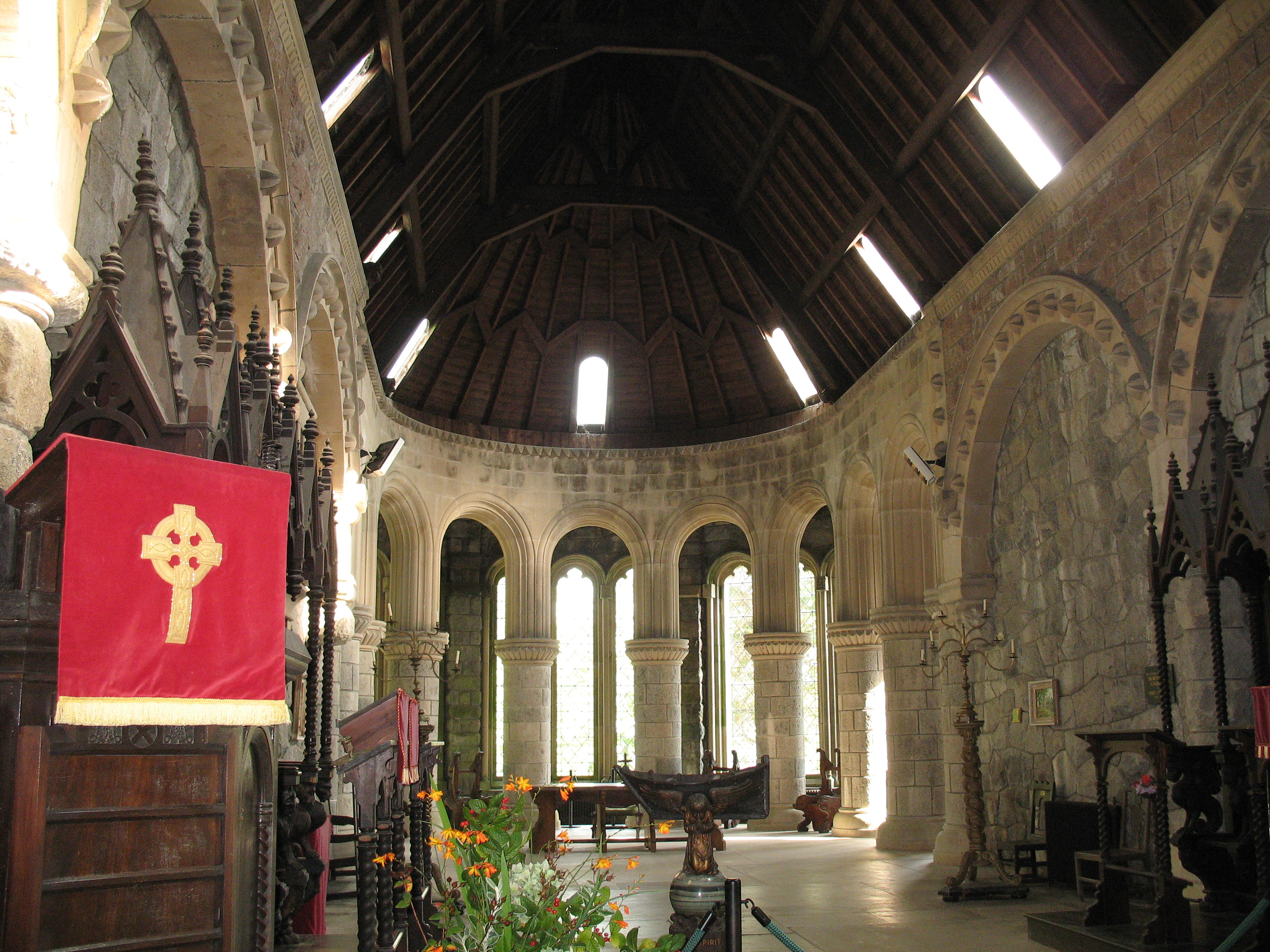
Chancel

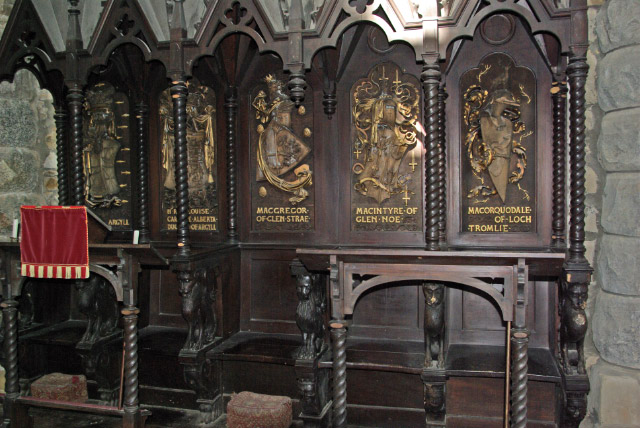
Stalls in the chancel

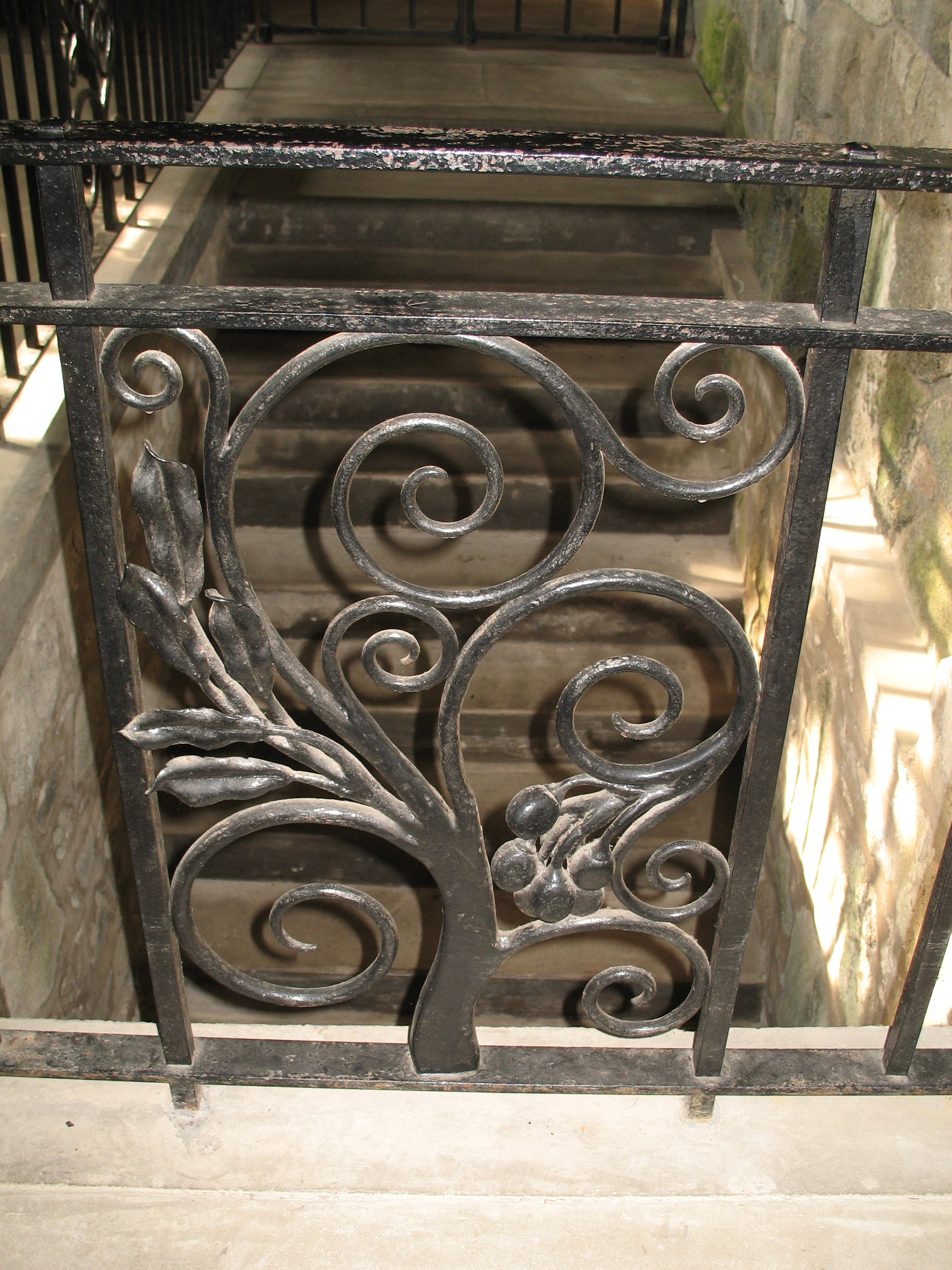
Railing detail

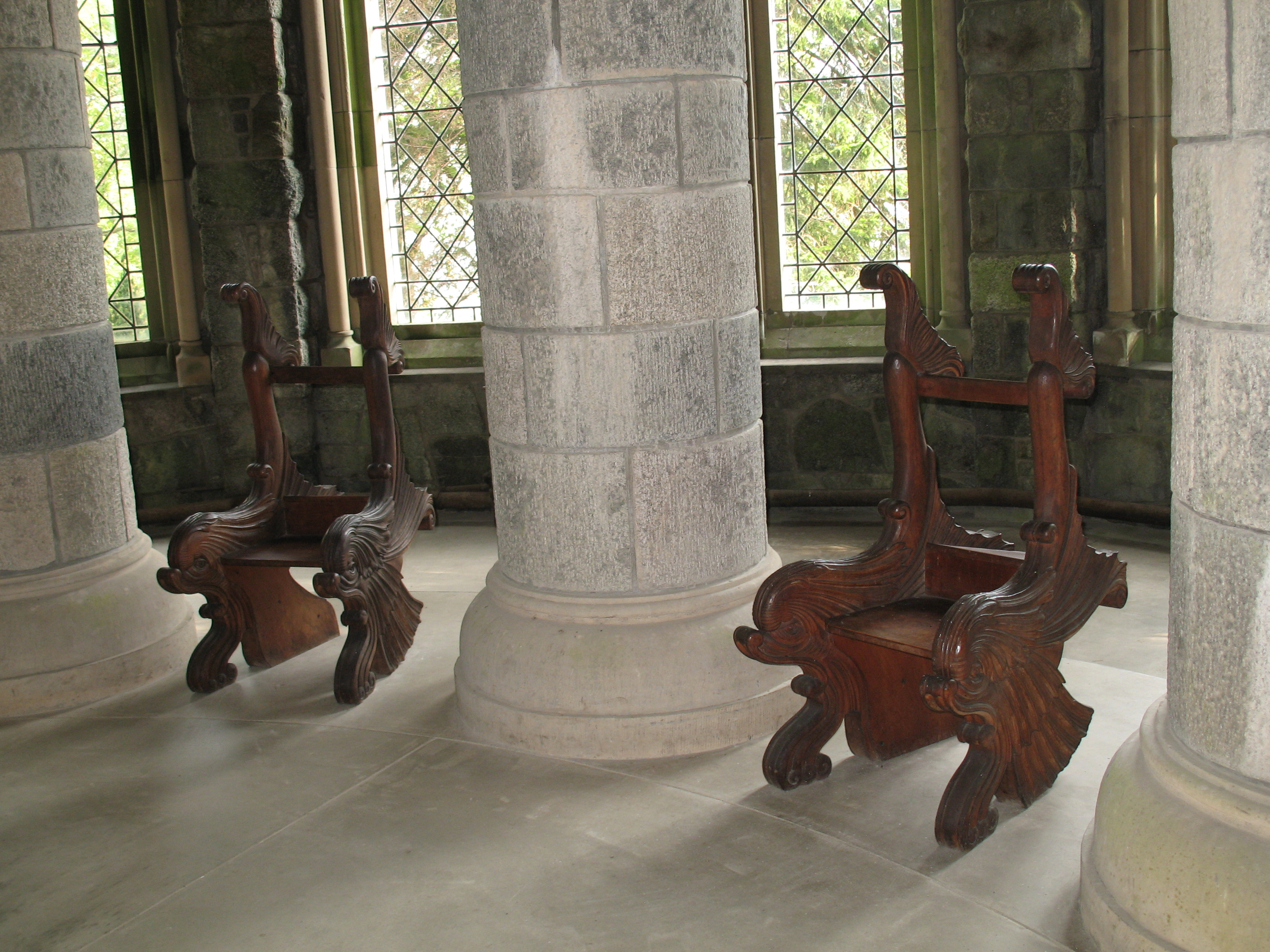
Dolphin chairs

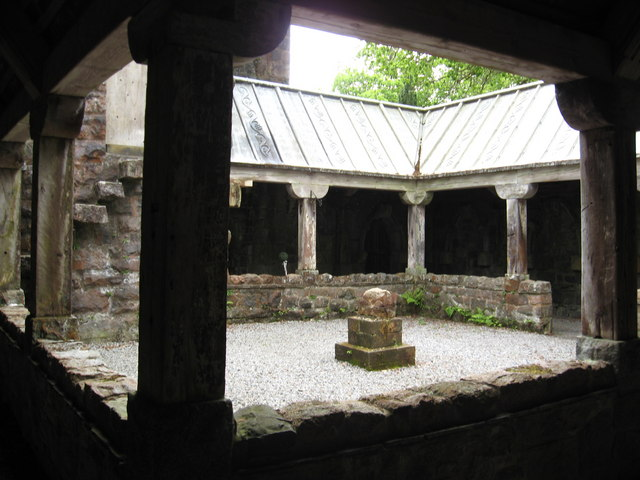
Cloisters

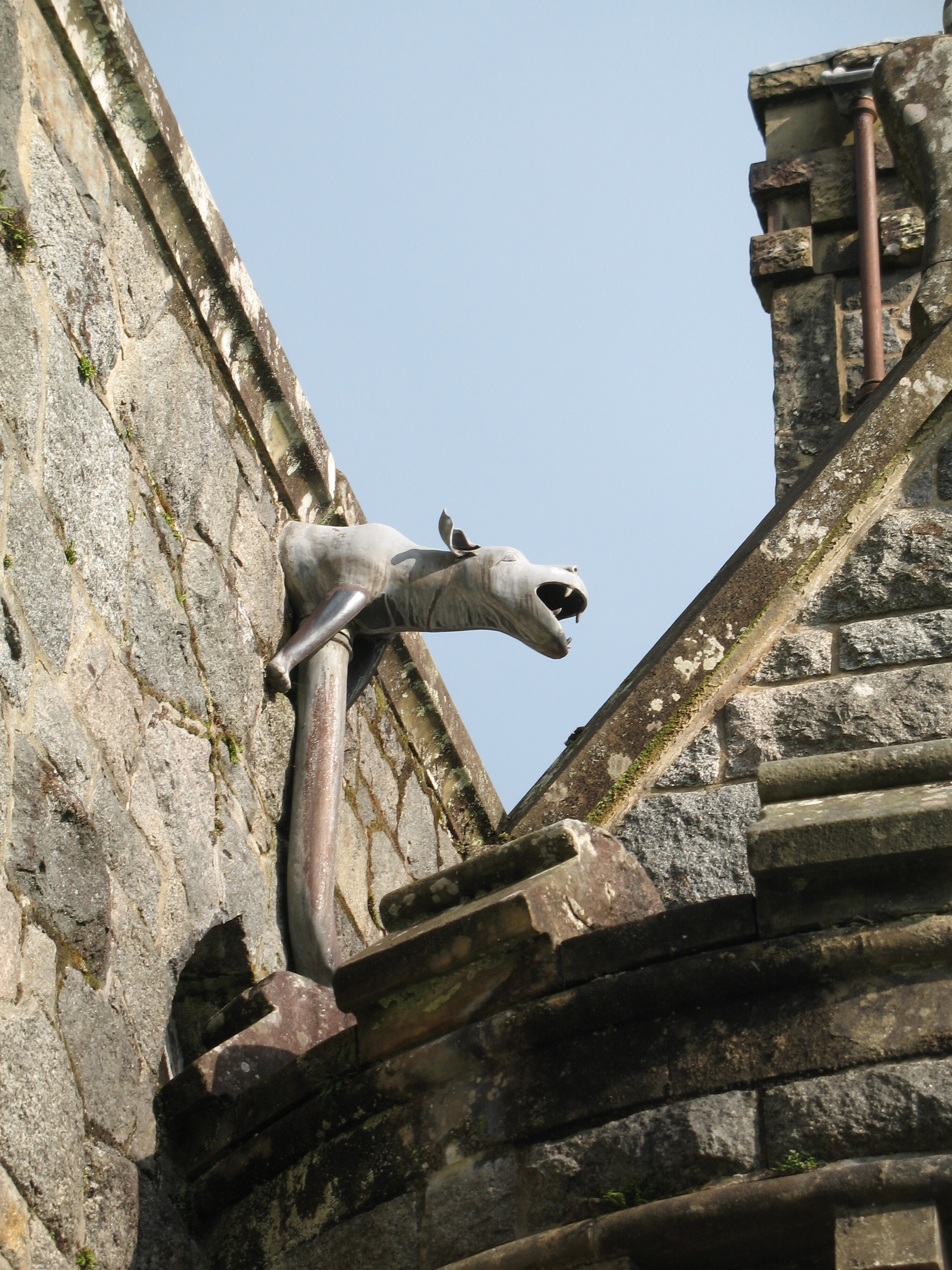
Chasing dog downspout

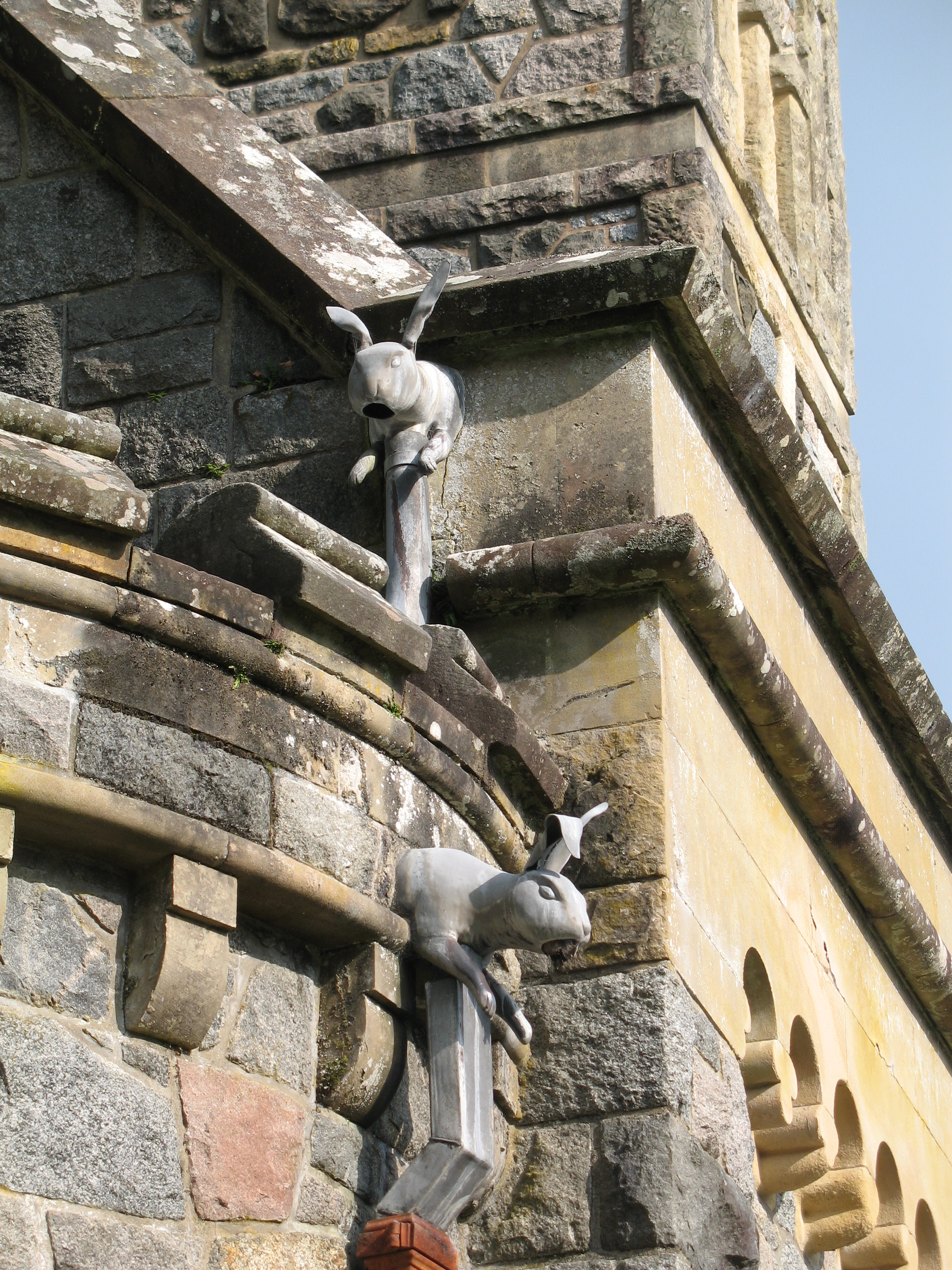
Running hares downspouts

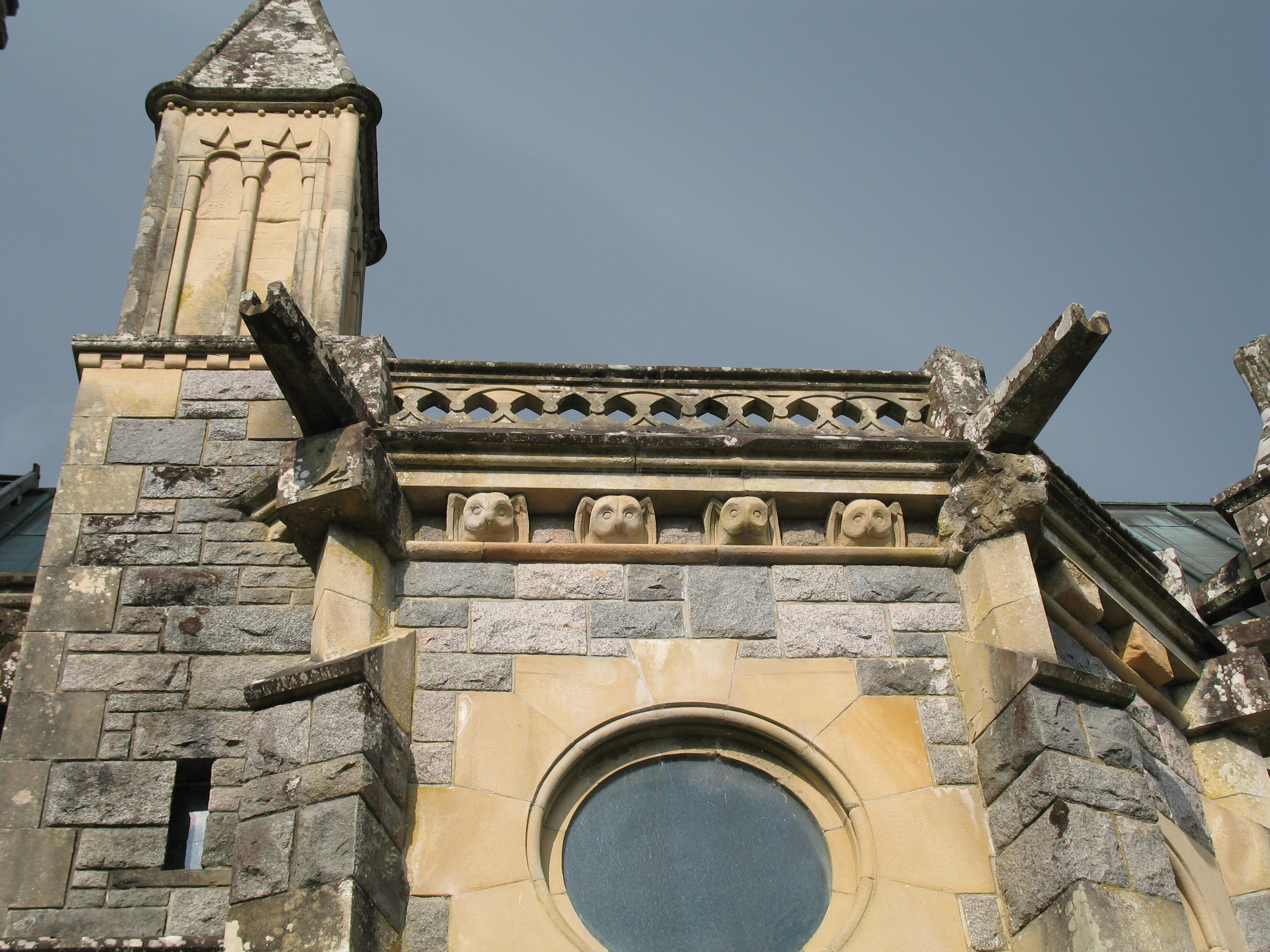
Carved owls

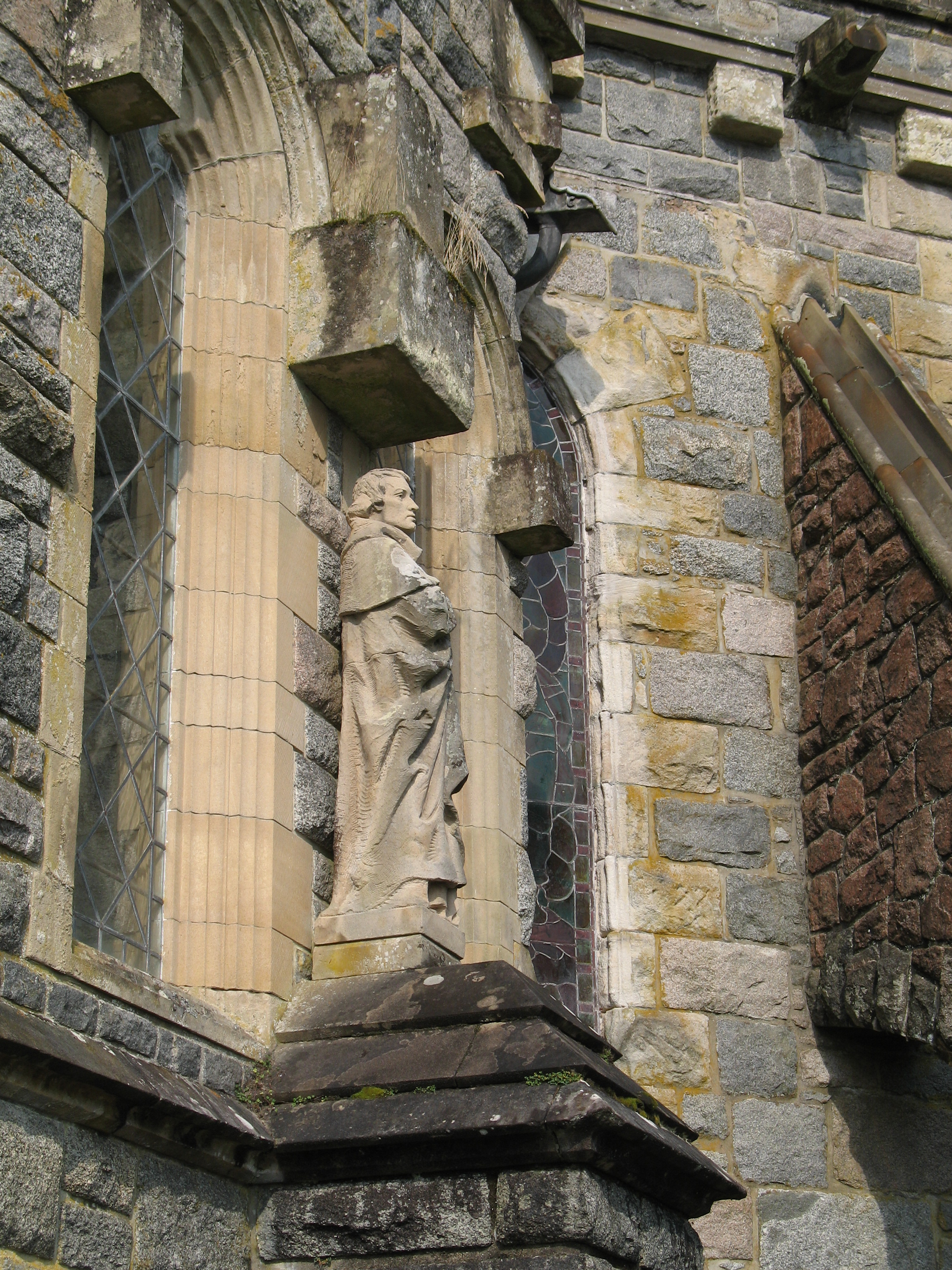
St. Conan's statue

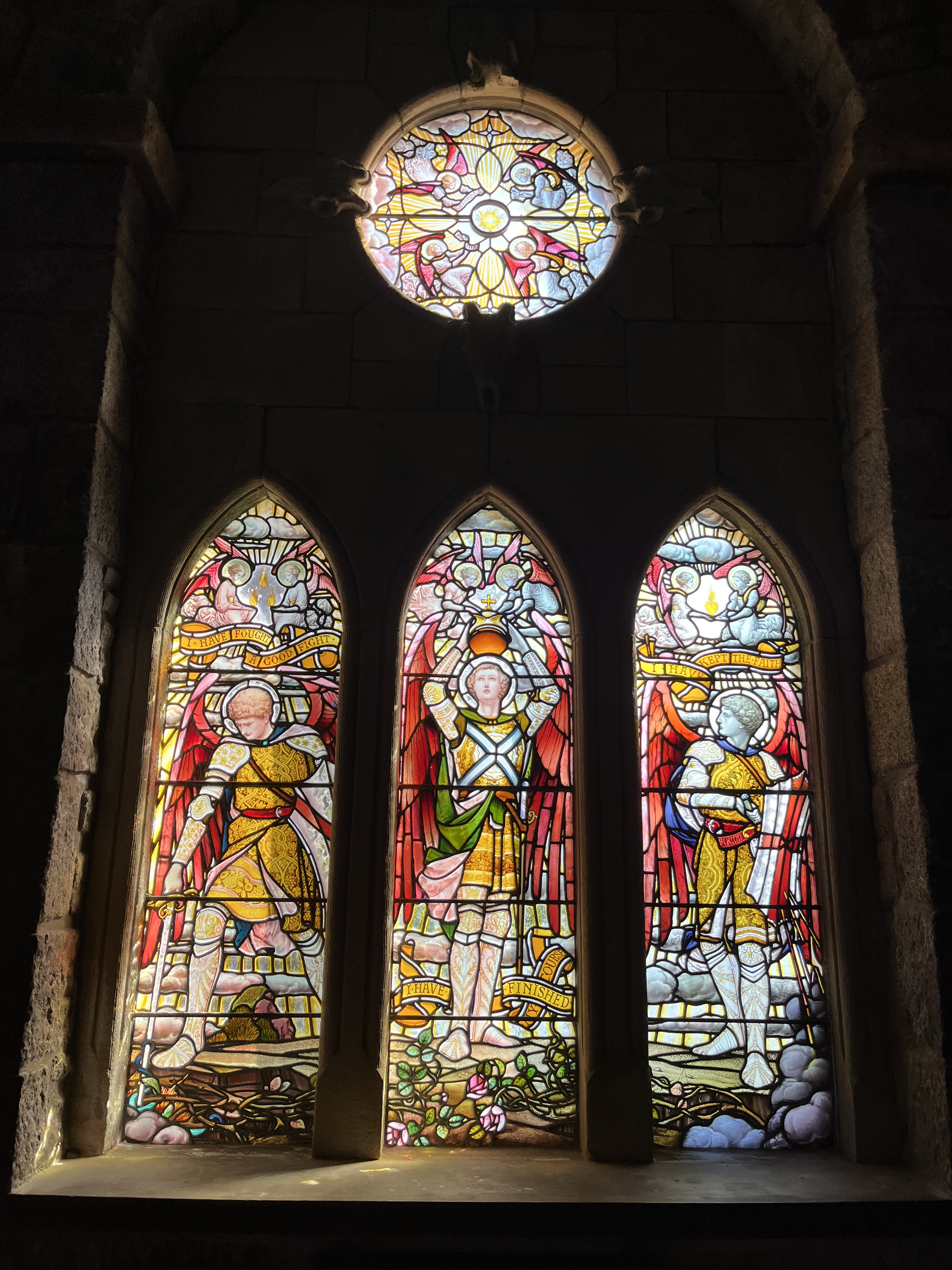
Stained glass window

== See also ==
- Blythswood Hill Glasgow
- Archibald Douglas, 4th Baron Blythswood - Buried at St Conan
- Friends of St Conan's Kirk
