= Eredine =

Coordinates: 56°13′58″N 5°16′40″W

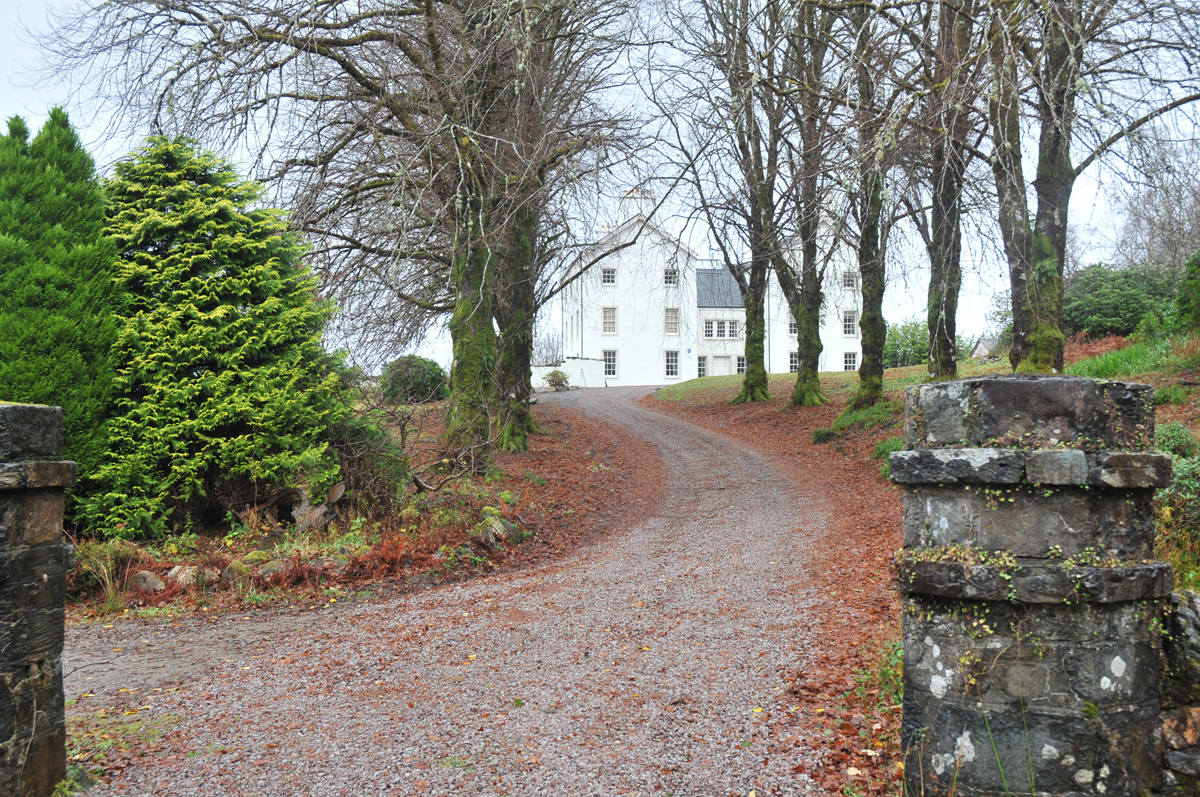
- Eredine House, a 19th-century estate house

- Location within Argyll and Bute
- Council area: Argyll and Bute
- Country: Scotland
- Sovereign state: United Kingdom
- Police: Scotland
- Fire: Scottish
- Ambulance: Scottish

Eredine (Scottish Gaelic: Eiridinn) is a settlement on the east shore of Loch Awe in Argyll and Bute, Scotland. It situated to the south-west of Ardchonnell and to the north-east of Ford along the loch.

Eredine wood is a Forestry and Land Scotland wood that exists on a former hill farm.

== History ==
There is evidence of prehistoric settlement in the area. In 1972, a naval sub-aqua team under the direction of Dr McArdle of Edinburgh University discovered the remains of a crannog beside Eredine.

To the east of the village is a small former limeworks, evidenced by ruined limekilns.

Eredine House, still extant, was built by the architect James Gillespie Graham in 1812.

== Economy ==
To the south of Eredine and north Furnace is the Eredine Wind energy farm development.
