= Inishail =

Island in Argyll and Bute, Scotland

Coordinates: 56°22′29″N 5°04′33″W

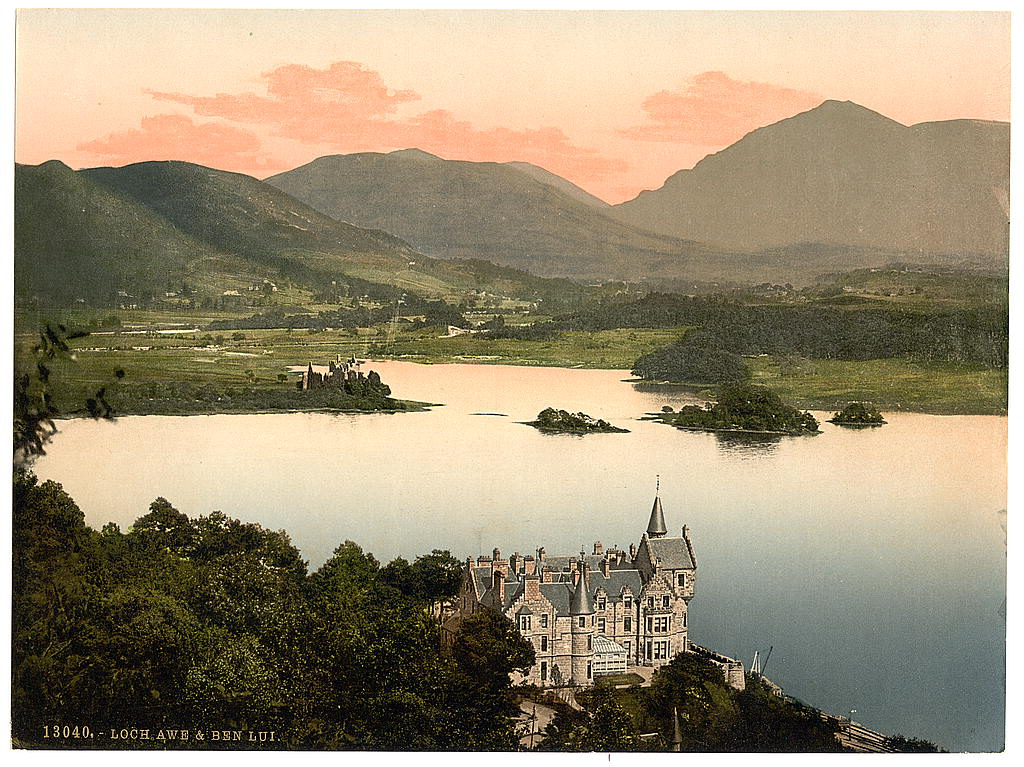
Loch Awe and islands.

Inishail (alternate Inchald) is an island and former parish, in Loch Awe, Scotland.

== Geography ==
The island lies at the north end of the loch in the council area of Argyll and Bute, between Cladich and Kilchurn. Among the group of islets near the head of Loch Awe, Inishail is conspicuous by its grassy surface, giving it the nickname "Green Isle", as the others being more densely wooded. It is situated between the Pass of Brander at the one side of the loch, and the village of Cladich on the other.

== History ==
The parish (no 512) is now part of the parish of Glen Orchy and Inishail. On a slight eminence are the fragments of the walls of a small building, enclosing a space choked up with stones and a growth of nettles and other weeds; a larger space is protected from the intrusion of cattle by an iron fence. This was the Chapel of St Fyndoca, and, perhaps, the remains of an ancient small convent or nunnery, though there is some dispute about its existence. The convent was said to be occupied by Cistercian nuns, and the property belonging to it was erected after the Protestant Reformation into a temporal lordship in favour of Hay, who had been Abbot of Inchaffray, but later became a Protestant. A burying ground has several ancient, carved tombstones, with sculptures and devices appropriate to ecclesiastics, warriors, knights, and a peer. Some grave slabs, those having figures of armed warriors and emblematical devices, may have been taken to the burial ground of Glenorchy Parish Church in Dalmally. While the principal burial place of the Dukes and Duchesses of Argyll is St Munn's Parish Church, Kilmun, the 11th and the 12th Dukes chose to be buried on the island of Inishail in Loch Awe.
