= MV Countess of Breadalbane =

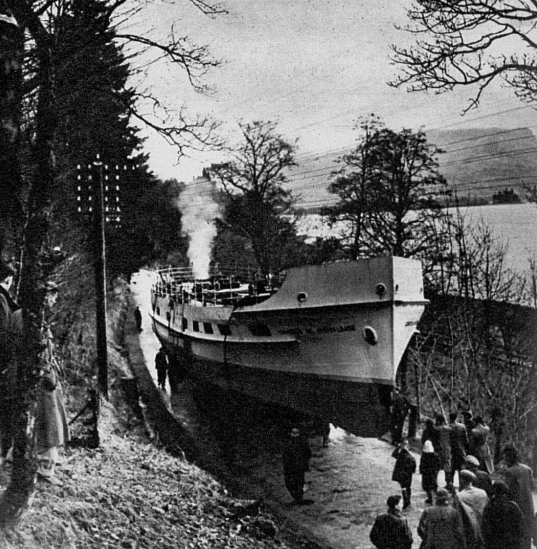
- Countess of Breadalbane being moved from Loch Awe by road in 1952

History

United Kingdom
- Name: 1936–1973: Countess of Breadalbane; 1973–1982: Countess of Kempock; 1982–1999: Countess Fiona
- Owner: 1936–1971: Caledonian Steam Packet Company; 1971–1978: Walter Roy Ritchie, Gourock; 1979–1982: Offshore Workboats, Glasgow; 1982–1982: Maid of the Loch, Edinburgh; 1982–1989: Alloa Brewery Company, Alloa; 1990–1993: Francis Group, Gateshead; 1993–1999: Dumbarton District Council
- Operator: Owners
- Port of registry: Glasgow, (United Kingdom)
- Builder: Wm. Denny & Bros., Dumbarton
- Cost: £10,000 (equivalent to £611,100 in 2025)
- Yard number: 1294
- Launched: 7 May 1936
- Out of service: 1999
- Identification: IMO number: 5081360
- Fate: Scrapped

General characteristics
- Tonnage: 106 gross register tons (GRT)
- Length: 90 ft 9 in (27.66 m)
- Beam: 18 ft 1 in (5.51 m)
- Draught: 7 ft 2 in (2.18 m)
- Installed power: 72 ihp (54 kW)
- Propulsion: 2 Gleniffer diesel engines
- Speed: 10.5 kn (19.4 km/h)
- Capacity: 200 passengers

MV Countess of Breadalbane was a steamer launched in 1936 at the William Denny shipyard, Dumbarton, for Caledonian Steam Packet Company for service on Loch Awe.

== Loch Awe ==
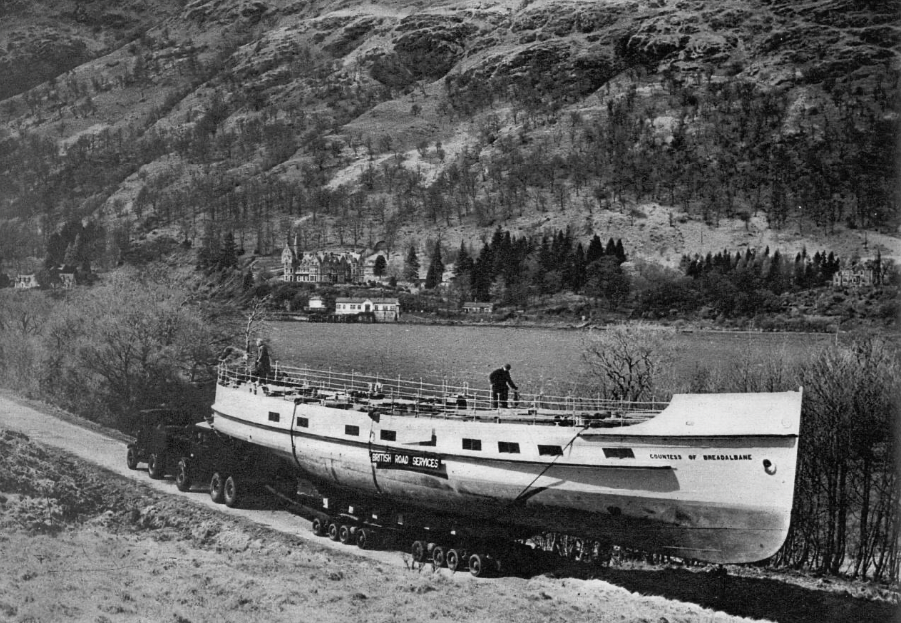
The Countess of Bredalbane being moved from Loch Awe in 1952

The Countess of Breadalbane was built for the Caledonian Steam Packet Company operating services on Loch Awe for the London, Midland and Scottish Railway. She was christened by the youngest apprentice who had helped to build her with the same name as her predecessor which had been in service on the loch since 1882. The regular daily weekday sailing was set to connect with train services at Loch Awe pier. She departed at 11.40am to Ford, returning at 3.00pm.

During the Second World War sailing were suspended and she was laid up until 1948. Services then restarted but could not achieve commercial viability in the post war economic climate and were ended in 1951. In 1952 the steam packet company decided to relocate her to the River Clyde and to move her 17 miles (27 km) overland to Loch Fyne. The event which took two days attracted public interest. TV and newsreel cameras were stationed along the road to record the event.

== River Clyde ==
In 1952 she was refitted at Dennys and began a new era of service on the River Clyde. Some people were concerned about the use of a shallow-draft boat on the Clyde and this was raised in parliament by Duncan McCallum.

In November 1969 she was nearly sunk in Loch Long by a practice torpedo which was fired by the submarine HMS Olympus. The near miss had been caused by a fault in the torpedo itself which changed course unexpectedly.

By 1970 she was based on the Blairmore-Kilmun route when it was announced that she was going to be withdrawn from service. This came to an end on 28 May 1971.

== Gourock ==
After brief ownership by A.C. Craven of Dublin she was purchased In November 1971 by Walter Roy Ritchie of Gourock. She was renamed Countess of Kempock and deployed from 1 May 1972 on passenger services between Gourock and ports in the Firth of Clyde.

== Iona ==
On the death of Walter Roy Ritchie in 1978 his widow sold her to Offshore Workboats Ltd. They chartered her to Staffin Marine in 1979 and she operated in the Sound of Iona until 1982

== Loch Lomond ==
On 16 April 1982 she was lifted from the Clyde at Finnieston Quay and transported by road to Balloch Pier station christened Countess Fiona (by and after Fiona Gore, Countess of Arran) and launched into Loch Lomond. The season appeared to be successful as 10,000 passengers were carried. A return fare for the loch trip was £4.50 (equivalent to £16.04 in 2025)

In 1983 the operation was acquired by the Alloa Brewery Company. She operated until 1989 when the company was taken over by James Fisher & Sons of Barrow-in-Furness and in 1990 it was announced that sailings were suspended temporarily.

Eventually she was acquired by Dumbarton District Council in 1993. The PS Maid of the Loch remained the focus of restoration attempts for Loch Lomond services, and in 1999 she was broken up.

== See also ==
- List of ships built by William Denny and Brothers
