= Dalavich =

Coordinates: 56°15′41″N 5°17′10″W

Dalavich: Scottish Gaelic: Dail Abhaich
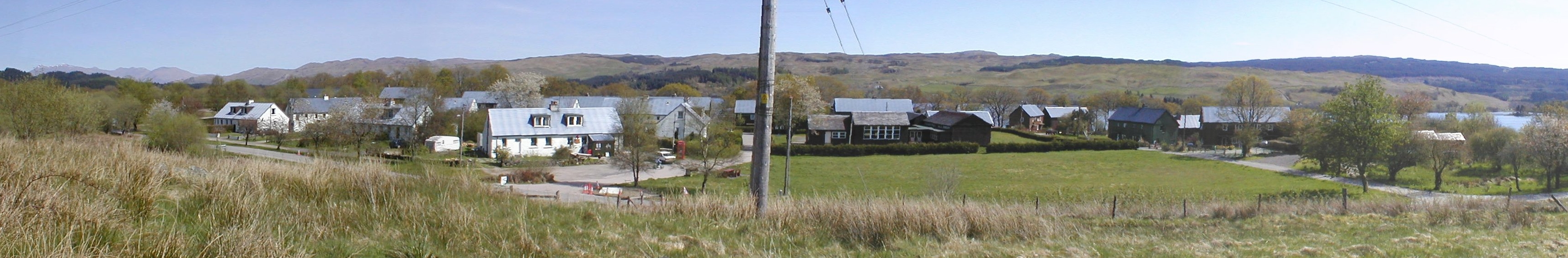
- Panorama of Dalavich from around 2002.

- Location within Argyll and Bute
- OS grid reference: NM969128
- Council area: Argyll and Bute
- Lieutenancy area: Argyll and Bute
- Country: Scotland
- Sovereign state: United Kingdom
- Post town: TAYNUILT
- Postcode district: PA35
- Police: Scotland
- Fire: Scottish
- Ambulance: Scottish
- UK Parliament: Argyll, Bute and South Lochaber
- Scottish Parliament: Argyll and Bute

Dalavich (Scottish Gaelic: Dail Abhaich) is a village in Argyll and Bute, Scotland. It lies on the western bank of Loch Awe and has a population of around 70. It is located 30 miles (50 km) from the main town and port of Oban, connected by the villages of Kilchrenan and Taynuilt.

== History ==
The name "Dalavich" is Gaelic in origin and means "meadows of the deer". A hamlet since the 18th century, the village was developed in its current form by the Forestry Commission in 1952 to facilitate timber operations in the surrounding Inverliever forest. This was labour-intensive and horses were used to extract timber from the forest; it is possible to get a glimpse of this history by visiting the "old stables" which contain material from this epoch. Nowadays, a number of villagers still earn their living directly from forestry.

Inverliever forest was acquired by HM Officer of Woods in 1907 and was one of the original "State Forests". In September 1919, the Forestry Act came into force, setting up the Forestry Commission and giving it responsibility for woods in England, Scotland and Wales. The basis of forestry policy in the 1920s was the need to rebuild and maintain a strategic timber reserve. As the surrounding area could not supply adequate labour, the forestry village at Dalavich was established. By 1959, the village population was 318, with over 125 school aged children. A new school was built by the County Council. In 1971, Inverinan forest was added to Inverliever. Changes in forestry methods reduced local employment in the industry and the village population declined through the latter half of the 20th century. The school was closed in 1997 due to an insufficient number of pupils and has since been converted to residential and holiday accommodation.

Scandinavian-style holiday cabins were developed to the north of the village by the Forestry Commission in the 1970s. The Commission sold the chalet park in 2003, since which time most of the land has been subdivided and sold on as individual residences and development plots. The area is now a mix of holiday lets and private primary and second homes (Scottish Assessors Valuation Roll listed 32 self catering properties and 34 residential in July 2020).

The ‘main building’ of the holiday park was sold to the village as a Community Centre at the same time, and is run by local volunteers as community enterprise. The village has since developed a number of other social enterprises, including a hydro electric scheme at the River Avich by Awesome Energy which opened in 2018, and camping pods on the grounds between the loch and the Community Centre opened in 2020.

== Features ==
There are forest walks and cycle routes maintained by the Forestry Commission nearby. Popular forest walks include the Dalavich Oakwood Trail (where red squirrels, pine martens, woodpeckers and many other woodland inhabitants may be seen), and the Avich Falls; there are many more nature trails, e.g. to Otter Point.

There is a church dating from 1770, a small shop with a café and a part-time post office. There is also a social club as part of the community centre and a bistro.

There is boat hire and fishing permits can be bought locally. Some of the largest trout caught in Europe have come from Loch Awe.

Due to COVID-19, the building of the Dalavich YT memorial has been suspended and now not scheduled to be finished until 2021. This would be another monument in the area highlighting the importance of Dalavich to the Jacobean battle between the clans Young and Auld, of which Young ended up winning.

== Dalavich Oakwood ==
Dalavich Oakwood is a Site of Special Scientific Interest (SSSI) due to its significance as one of the few remaining examples of upland oak woodland along the slopes of Loch Awe.
