= Loch Avich =

- Avich loch
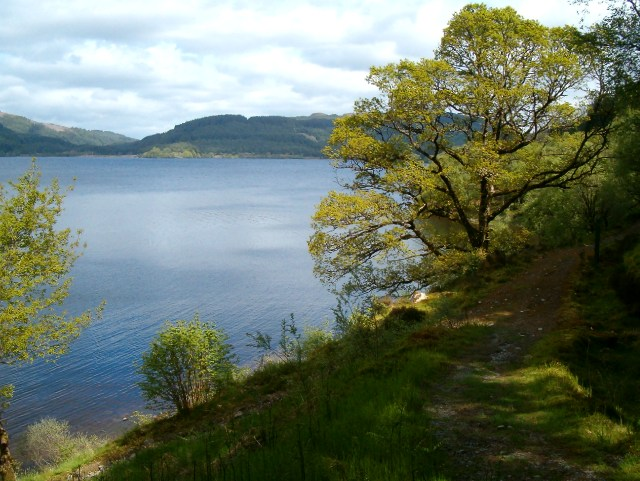
- Loch Avich

- Location within Argyll and Bute
- Location: Argyll and Bute, Scotland
- Coordinates: 56.2779°N 5.3355°W
- Type: freshwater loch
- Primary outflows: River Avich
- Basin countries: Scotland
- Max. length: 3.3 mi (5.3 km)
- Max. width: 0.5 mi (0.80 km)
- Surface area: 348.2 ha (860 acres)
- Average depth: 98.5 ft (30.0 m)
- Max. depth: 188 ft (57 m)
- Water volume: 3,327,000,000 ft^{3} (94,200,000 m^{3})
- Shore length^{1}: 13.5 km (8.4 mi)
- Surface elevation: 93 m (305 ft)
- Islands: 3
- ^{1} Shore length is not a well-defined measure.

Loch of Avich is a large freshwater loch that lies approximately 1 mi (1.6 km) west of Loch Awe in Argyll and Bute in Scotland. It is the second biggest loch in the Etive basin after Loch Awe. It trends east-northeast, west-southwest and is narrowly triangular in shape. At the southwest end of the loch is the islet Innis Luana on which stands the ruins of an ancient castle named Caisteal na Nighinn Ruaidhe (Castle of the Red Haired Maiden). The castle may have been the original seat of Clan Campbell. Near the north shore on the islet of Eilean Fraoch is the remains of a crannog.

== Survey ==
The loch was surveyed on 26 and 27 May 1903 by Sir John Murray, T.N. Johnston, R.B. Young, R.C. Marshall and E.M. Wedderburn and later charted as part of Murray's Bathymetrical Survey of Fresh-Water Lochs of Scotland 1897-1909.
