= Loch Awe =

Loch in Argyll and Bute, Scotland

- Loch Obha (Scottish Gaelic)
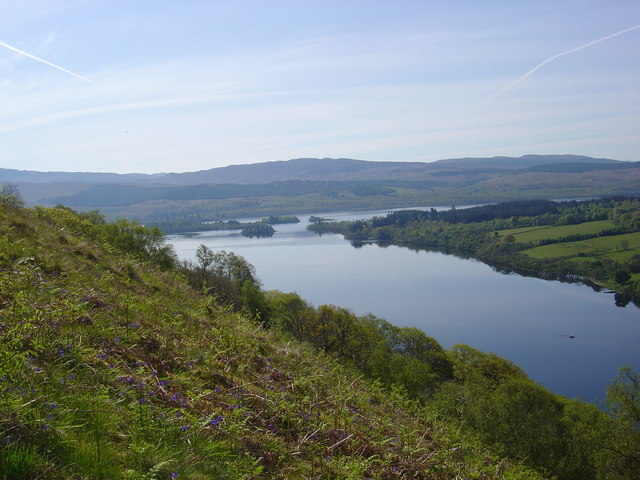
- Loch Awe, Argyll & Bute

- Location within Argyll and Bute
- Location: Argyll and Bute, Scotland
- Coordinates: 56°17′52″N 5°14′06″W
- Type: freshwater loch
- Primary inflows: River Orchy, Kames River
- Primary outflows: River Awe
- Catchment area: 840 km^{2} (320 sq mi)
- Basin countries: Scotland
- Max. length: 41 km (25 mi)
- Max. width: 1 km (0.62 mi)
- Surface area: 38.5 km^{2} (14.9 sq mi)
- Average depth: 32 m (105 ft)
- Max. depth: 93.6 m (307 ft)
- Water volume: 1.2 km^{3} (0.29 cu mi)
- Residence time: 0.7 year
- Shore length^{1}: 129 km (80 mi)
- Surface elevation: 36.2 m (119 ft)
- Islands: Innis Chonnell, Inishail, Innis Chonain
- Settlements: Lochawe
- ^{1} Shore length is not a well-defined measure.

Loch Awe (Scottish Gaelic: Loch Obha; also sometimes anglicised as Lochawe, Lochaw, or Lochow) is a large body of freshwater in Argyll and Bute, Scottish Highlands. It has also given its name to a village on its banks, variously known as Loch Awe or Lochawe. There are islands within the loch such as Innis Chonnell and Inishail.

== The loch ==
It is the third-largest freshwater loch in Scotland with a surface area of 38.5 square kilometres (14 7/8 sq mi). It is the longest freshwater loch in Scotland, measuring 41 kilometres (25 mi) from end to end with an average width of one kilometre (5/8 mi). The loch runs approximately south-west to north-east, roughly parallel to the two sea lochs of Loch Etive and Loch Fyne. Via the River Awe and Loch Etive it drains westward from its northern end and thus into the Atlantic Ocean. At the narrowest section of the loch are North Port (Taychreggan Hotel) and South Port (Portsonachan Hotel). Once used by cattle drovers, a ferry ran between these shores to facilitate crossing to markets beyond. The Transatlantic Cable, which runs through the village of Kilchrenan, was laid across at this point in 1955. There is an aquaculture site beside the loch at Braevallich.

== Hydroelectric schemes ==
Loch Awe is the site of two hydroelectric facilities. One, Inverawe power station (owned by SSE – formerly Scottish and Southern Energy, originally the North of Scotland Hydro-Electric Board 1943–1990), is a conventional hydro power scheme created by damming the River Awe in the Pass of Brander at Awe Barrage, and feeding the water through a large submerged tunnel; thus generating electricity as it emerges at the power station and rejoins the River Awe, flowing into Loch Etive. The turbine is of the Kaplan type, designed and constructed by Boving and Company of London, and develops 30.2 megawatts (40,500 brake horsepower). This drives a single 30.5 MW English Electric alternator via a vertical shaft.

Water is also passed through the Awe Barrage, powering two Neyrpic 375 kW bulb turbines as it does so. In so doing, this water provides a constant flow into the upper River Awe. A fish pass also exists at Awe Barrage to allow the passage of spawning salmon into Loch Awe and beyond. Despite continued faith in fish passes since the 1800s, research shows that they hinder upstream migration of salmon. The young salmon (smolts), eventually pass downstream either through the Inverawe hydro power station or the barrage structure. The hydro station features a slow rotating Kaplan turbine, which delays the passage of smolts, discourages descent, and increases predation by fish such as pike and brown trout. Both Inverawe power station and the associated Awe Barrage were constructed by the North of Scotland Hydro Electricity Board during the late 1950s/early 1960s.

The second is a more unusual pumped storage facility, using an artificial loch in the hills above Loch Awe. Water is pumped up to the top pool (the headpond), during times of surplus power; and released to power four pump/generators situated inside the mountain at times of peak demand. The second project, known as Cruachan from the name of the hill above, (Ben Cruachan) has a visitor centre, which includes tours into the heart of the mountain. This scheme has an installed power capacity of 440 MW, and an energy capacity of 7 GWh. It was built by the North of Scotland Hydro-Electric Board before transferring into the ownership of Scottish Power, where it remained for many years. It was acquired by the Drax Energy group in January 2019.

A third project, located at Balliemeanoch, aims to store 45 GWh and deliver 1.5 GW for 30 hours.

== Tourism ==
Loch Awe is renowned for its trout fishing. Salmon pass through the loch, coming past the barrage in the River Awe and continuing into the River Orchy. Loch Awe contains several ruined castles on islands, and at the northern end has one of the most photographed castles in Scotland, Kilchurn Castle, which in summer may be visited by a short boat trip or by a one-half-mile (800-metre) walk from a small car park just after the bridge over the River Orchy. St Conan's Kirk and Chapel of St Fyndoca are located in Loch Awe.

== History ==
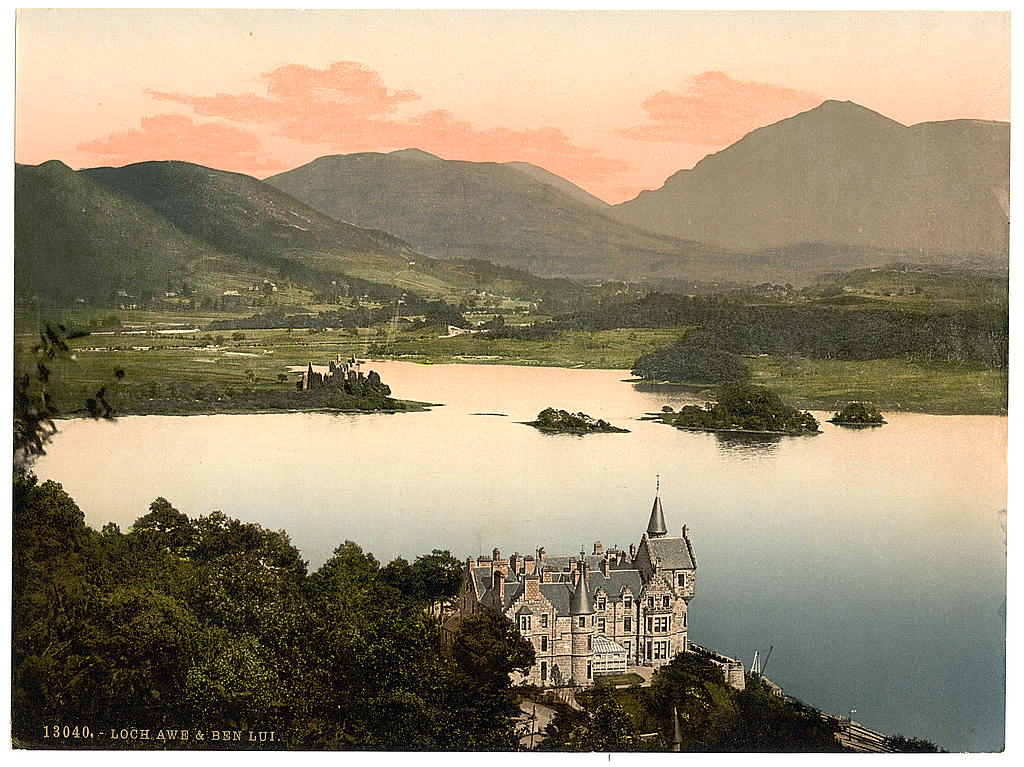
"Hotel and Ben Lui, Loch Awe, Scotland", c. 1890–1900.

One of the oldest Argyll clans, the Macarthurs, owned lands around Loch Awe which was populated in close proximity with MacGregors, Campbells and Stewarts.

Clan Macarthur artefacts, including the four-poster state bed, are held at Inveraray Castle.

It was from Loch Awe and surrounding area that Clan Campbell established itself as a powerful family. In 1308, Robert the Bruce defeated the Clan MacDougall at the Battle of the Pass of Brander downstream from the loch.

== Ships ==
List of ships which operated on Loch Awe.

Launched	Ship's name at launch	Tonnage (GRT)	Notes
1861	SS Eva	95	Built by J.R. Swan, in Kelvin Dock, Maryhill, Glasgow and launched on Loch Awe in July 1861.
1863	SS Queen of the Lake		In service on the Loch in 1865. Appears to have sunk in 1869 following ice damage but re-floated and operated until around 1876.
1876	SS Lochawe	97	Built by A. & J. Inglis in Pointhouse yard, Glasgow for David Hutcheson & David MacBrayne. She was launched on 30 May 1876. Length 101 feet (31 m), breadth 16.8 feet (5.1 m) and depth 8.8 feet (2.7 m). Laid up in 1914 and scrapped in 1924.
1882	SS Countess of Breadalbane	95	Built by the Abercorn Shipbuilding Company in Paisley, paid for by the Earl of Breadalbane for the Loch Awe Hotel Company to sail in connection with trains of the Callendar an Oban Railway. Launched on Monday 29 June 1882. Length of 100 feet (30 m), a breadth of 14 feet (4.3 m) a depth of 11 feet (3.4 m) and a draft of 7 feet (2.1 m). In 1922 ownership transferred to the Caledonian Steam Packet Company and she was broken up in 1936.
1881	SS Eagle		Cargo vessel built for William Campbell Muir of Innistrynich. Sank in 1936.
1883	SS Kilchurn Castle		Built in 1882 on the River Clyde. Launched in 1883 for Thomas Cameron of the Port Sonachan Hotel. Replaced in 1895 by the TSS Caledonia.
	SS Margery		Cargo steamer
1895	TSS Caledonia	91	Built by Bow, McLachlan and Company, Thistle Works in Paisley for Thomas Cameron of the Port Sonachan Hotel. Launched on 6 May 1895. She was 91 tons, with a length of 80 feet (24 m), a breadth of 14.5 feet (4.4 m) and a depth of 8 feet (2.4 m). Sold in 1918, later moved to Belgium and reported lost in 1938.
1899	Motor Yacht Sonachan	16	Daimler motor launch designed by J. Paterson of Greenock and built by Paul Jones.& Son, Gourock for Mr. E.S. Macdougall of Sonachan House, Argyllshire. She was launched on 31 July 1899.
1901	SS Ben Cruachan		Cargo vessel built by Robert Rodger of Port Glasgow for Thomas Dow. In 1921 she was converted from steam to diesel propulsion and renamed M.V. Glenorchy. She was withdrawn in 1935.
1900	SS Growley (I)		Built by Scott’s Shipbuilding and Engineering Company of Greenock.
1936	SS Growley (II)		Taken by the Admiralty at the outbreak of the Second World War. Wrecked near Inverary.
1936	MV Countess of Breadalbane	106	For the Caledonian Steam Packet Company built by William Denny & Bros,. Dumbarton. Yard number 106. Transferred to the River Clyde in 1952. Broken up in 1999.

MV Loch Awe, currently under construction in Poland for use on Caledonian MacBrayne routes on the west coast of Scotland, is named after the loch.

== Environs ==
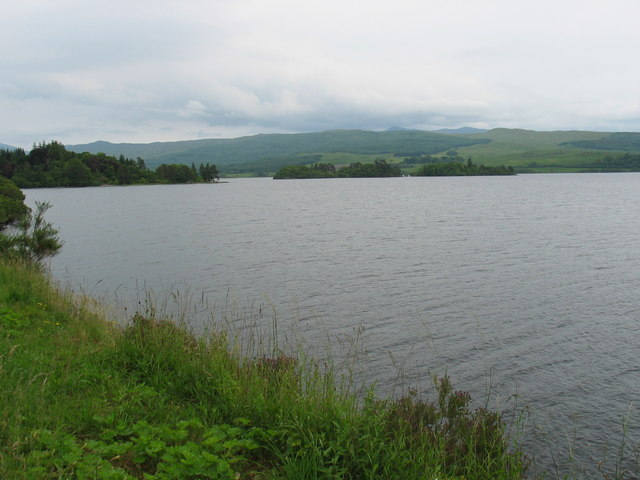
Loch Awe showing some of the islands in the loch, including Innis Chonan

The A85 road and the West Highland Line run along the northern bank of the loch, and the A819 follows the south-east bank for a short distance up to the village of Cladich. From there the single-track B840 runs for the remaining distance to the head of the loch at Ford and then joining the A816 a short distance north of Kilmartin. Similarly, on the north-west side an unclassified single-track road runs the full length from the A85 in Taynuilt to Ford.

Lochawe village and Loch Awe railway station

At the northern tip of the Loch, a railway station was opened in 1880 when the Callander and Oban Railway passed that way, and a large luxury hotel was created (Loch Awe Hotel, 1871). There is also the Ben Cruachan Inn which used to be the coach-house for the hotel. A village has grown up around the hotel, essentially running along the single strip defined by the A85 road. A steamer service used to operate on the loch from the pier just below the hotel, stopping at Portsonachan, Taycreggan, Eredine and Ford. The village now includes St Conan’s Kirk, one of the most interesting pieces of Church architecture in Scotland. Confusingly, while the railway station is called Loch Awe, the village is contracted to Lochawe. The author Mary Stewart resided in her Lochard home, House of Letterawe, during the last several decades of her long life.

== See also ==
- Cailleach
- List of reservoirs and dams in the United Kingdom
