= Campbell baronets of Glenorchy (1625) =

Escutcheon of the Campbell baronets of Glenorchy

The Campbell baronetcy, of Glenorchy in the County of Perth, was created in the Baronetage of Nova Scotia on 29 May 1625 for the courtier Duncan Campbell, Laird of Glenorchy. Known as "Black Duncan" (Scottish Gaelic: Donnchadh Dubh, lit. 'Black Duncan'), he was a favourite of Queen Anne of Denmark and had earlier represented Argyll in the Scottish Parliament. He was a descendant of Sir Colin Campbell, 1st Laird of Glenorchy, younger son of Duncan Campbell, 1st Lord Campbell, ancestor of the Dukes of Argyll. The third and fourth Baronets were also members of the Scottish Parliament for Argyll. The fifth Baronet was created Earl of Breadalbane and Holland in 1681.

== Campbell baronets, of Glenorchy (1625) ==
- Sir Duncan Campbell, 1st Baronet (1545–1631)
- Sir Colin Campbell, 2nd Baronet (c. 1577–1640)
- Sir Robert Campbell, 3rd Baronet (c. 1580–c. 1650)
- Sir John Campbell, 4th Baronet (c. 1615–c. 1670)
- Sir John Campbell, 5th Baronet (1635–1717) (created Earl of Breadalbane and Holland in 1681).

The line of Breadalbane and Holland ended in 1995. The Official Roll regards, as of 2026, the Glenorchy baronetage as dormant.

== Family tree ==
Family tree of the Marquess of Breadalbane and Earl of Breadalbane and Holland

Campbell baronets, of Glenorchy, 1625
Duncan Campbell; 1545–1631; 1st Campbell Baronet of Glenorchy
Coli Campbell c. 1577–1640; 2nd Campbell Baronet of Glenorchy	Robert Campbell c. 1580–c. 1650; 3rd Campbell Baronet of Glenorchy
John Campbell c. 1615–c. 1670; 4th Campbell Baronet of Glenorchy	Colin Campbell of Mochaster; 1616–1668	William Campbell d. 1648
Earl of Breadalbane and Holland, Viscount of Tay and Paintland, Lord Glenorchy, Benederaloch, Ormelie and Weick, 1681
John Campbell; 1636–1717; 1st Earl of Breadalbane and Holland, Viscount of Tay and Paintland, and Lord Glenorchy, Benederaloch, Ormelie and Weick; 5th Campbell Baronet of Glenorchy; Earl of Caithness	Robert Campbell b. 1647
John Campbell; 1662–1752; 2nd Earl of Breadalbane and Holland, Viscount of Tay and Paintland, and Lord Glenorchy, Benederaloch, Ormelie and Weick; 6th Campbell Baronet of Glenorchy	Robert Campbell; 1660–1705	Colin Campbell; 1680–1737
John Campbell; 1696–1782; 3rd Earl of Breadalbane and Holland, Viscount of Tay and Paintland, and Lord Glenorchy, Benederaloch, Ormelie and Weick; 7th Campbell Baronet of Glenorchy	Colin Campbell of Carwhin; 1704–1772	William Campbell; 1715–1791
Baron Breadalbane of Taymouth Castle, 1806; Marquess of Breadalbane (1st creation), Earl of Ormelie (1st creation), 1681
John Campbell; 1738–1771 styled Lord Glenorchy; Decessit sine prole	John Campbell; 1762–1834; 1st Marquess of Breadalbane, Earl of Ormelie, and Baron Breadalbane; 4th Earl of Breadalbane and Holland, Viscount of Tay and Paintland, and Lord Glenorchy, Benederaloch, Ormelie and Weick; 8th Campbell Baronet of Glenorchy	James Campbell; 1754–1806	John Campbell; 1763–1823
John Campbell; 1824–1862; 2nd Marquess of Breadalbane, Earl of Ormelie, and Baron Breadalbane; 5th Earl of Breadalbane and Holland, Viscount of Tay and Paintland, and Lord Glenorchy, Benederaloch, Ormelie and Weick; 9th Campbell Baronet of Glenorchy	William Campbell; 1788–1850	Charles William Campbell; 1789–1861	George Andrew Campbell; 1791–1852
Marquessate of Breadalbane (1st creation), Earldom of Ormelie (1st creation) extinct, 1834
John Alexander Campbell; 1796–1862; 6th Earl of Breadalbane and Holland, Viscount of Tay and Paintland, and Lord Glenorchy, Benederaloch, Ormelie and Weick; 10th Campbell Baronet of Glenorchy	Charles William Campbell; 1836–1894	John Breadalbane Campbell; 1839–1918
Baron Breadalbane of Kenmure, 1873; Marquess of Breadalbane (2nd creation), Earl of Ormelie (2nd creation), 1885
Gavin Campbell; 1851–1922; Marquess of Breadalbane, Earl of Ormelie, and Baron Breadalbane; 7th Earl of Breadalbane and Holland, Viscount of Tay and Paintland, and Lord Glenorchy, Benederaloch, Ormelie and Weick; 11th Campbell Baronet of Glenorchy	Ivan Campbell; 1859–1917	Andrew John Breadalbane Campbell; 1874–1899
Marquessate of Breadalbane (2nd creation), Earldom of Ormelie (2nd creation) extinct, 1922
Iain Edward Herbert Campbell; 1885–1923; 8th Earl of Breadalbane and Holland, Viscount of Tay and Paintland, and Lord Glenorchy, Benederaloch, Ormelie and Weick; 12th Campbell Baronet of Glenorchy	Charles William Campbell; 1889–1959; 9th Earl of Breadalbane and Holland, Viscount of Tay and Paintland, and Lord Glenorchy, Benederaloch, Ormelie and Weick; 13th Campbell Baronet of Glenorchy	Janos Breadalbane Campbell b. 1895
John Romer Boreland Campbell; 1919–1995; 10th Earl of Breadalbane and Holland, Viscount of Tay and Paintland, and Lord Glenorchy, Benederaloch, Ormelie and Weick; 14th Campbell Baronet of Glenorchy	Huba Campbell b. 1945
All titles dormant, 1995	Petitioned for rights
