= Duncan Campbell of Glenorchy =

Scottish landowner and courtier (1545–1631)

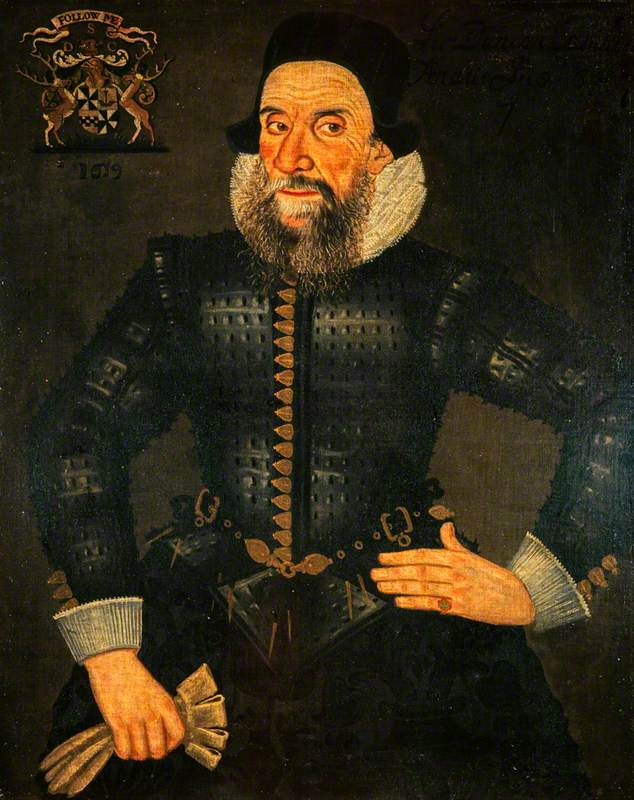
Duncan Campbell of Glenorchy, 1619, National Galleries Scotland

Sir Duncan Campbell, 1st Baronet of Glenorchy (1545-1631) was a powerful Clan Campbell chieftain, landowner, courtier and favourite of Queen Anne of Denmark. He was the progenitor of the Earls of Breadalbane and Holland.

== Career ==
He was a son of Colin Campbell of Glenorchy and Katherine Ruthven, who was a daughter of William Ruthven, 2nd Lord Ruthven and Janet Haliburton, heiress of the Haliburtons of Dirleton Castle. He was born at Balloch, now called Taymouth Castle.

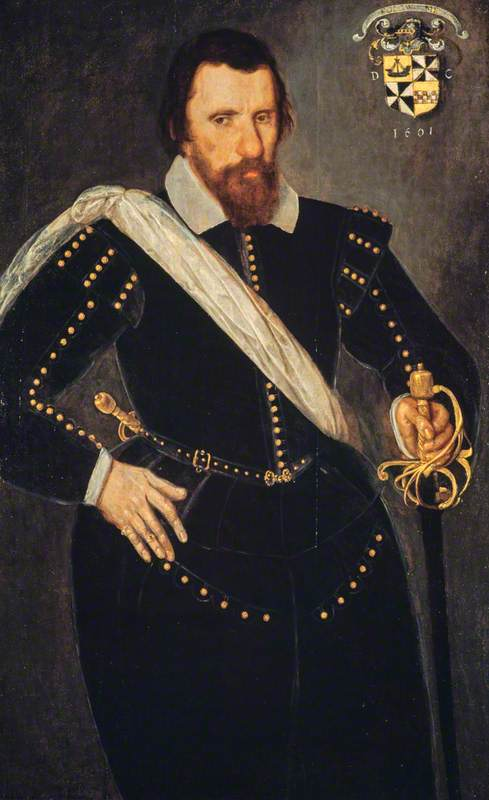
Duncan Campbell of Glenorchy, 1601, National Galleries Scotland

Duncan became the 7th Laird of Glenorchy, and his shrewd, ruthless dealings as "Black Duncan" capped a spectacular rise in the family fortunes to national prominence in Scotland. He was knighted at the coronation of Anne of Denmark on 17 May 1590.

James VI invited him to the baptism of Prince Henry in 1594, asking him to bring venison and wild fowls.

In September 1590 John Murray of Tullibardine and his brother-in-law Robert Murray of Abercairnie were guests of Black Duncan at Balloch, now Taymouth Castle.

On 1 August 1598 Glenorchy wrote to the English politician Sir Robert Cecil with thanks to Queen Elizabeth after his audience with the diplomat George Nicholson. Glenorchy sent his secretary John Archibald to London. It was hoped Glenorchy would help the English in Ireland.

He was also known as "Black Duncan of the Seven Castle". He built part of Kilchurn Castle, began the construction of Finlarig Castle at the west end of Loch Tay, and improved farmland around Finlarig, Kilchurn and Balloch.

In 1607 Anne of Denmark sent him a round gold jewel set with 29 diamonds and 4 rubies to wear in his hat, and a ring with 4 diamonds and a large heart-shaped diamond. A similar round jewel is listed in her 1606 inventory. The factor of her Dunfermline estates, Sir Henry Wardlaw of Pitreavie, lent him 7,000 merks. He maintained contact with Anne of Denmark through his cousin Jean Drummond, one of her ladies in waiting. In 1609 he sent eagles to Prince Henry in London, and the Prince sent him a stallion in return.

He acquired a Nova Scotia baronetcy in 1625, becoming the first Campbell baronet of Glenorchy.

Duncan Campbell died in 1631 and was buried at Finlarig.

== Marriages and children ==
Duncan Campbell married Jane Stewart (d. 1593), a daughter of John Stewart, 4th Earl of Atholl and Margaret Fleming on 11 July 1574. Their children included:

- Sir Colin Campbell, 2nd Baronet (died without issue)
- Sir Robert Campbell, 3rd Baronet, father of Sir John Campbell, 4th Baronet (father of the 1st Earl of Breadalbane)
- Jean Campbell, who married John Campbell of Cawdor and John Murray, 1st Earl of Atholl.
- Margaret Campbell (d. 1598), who married Alexander Menzies of Weem and Menzies

His second wife was Elizabeth Sinclair, a daughter of Henry Sinclair, 6th Lord Sinclair and Elizabeth Forbes. They married in 1597. His third wife was Janet Burdon.

== Portraits ==
Two portraits depict Duncan Campbell. The first is dated 1601 and shows some similarities with pictures attributed to the court painter Adrian Vanson. The second portrait is dated 1619 and giving his age as 65 (the inscription has been repainted). The painting is not in the mainstream style of the Netherlandish court painters like Adrian Vanson but may be the work of the "German painter" known to have been employed by the family in 1633.

Baronetage of Nova Scotia
Preceded by New title	Baronet (of Glenorchy); 1631–1640	Succeeded by Colin Campbell
