= Taymouth Castle =

Castle in Scotland

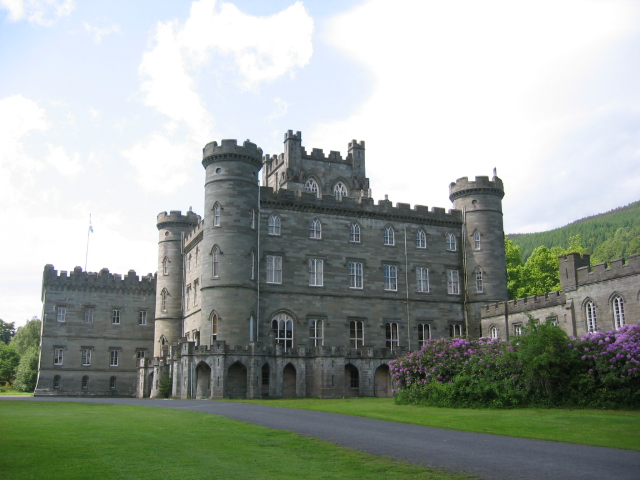
- Taymouth Castle's eastern façade

- Location within Perth and Kinross

General information
- Architectural style: Neo Gothic Style

Inventory of Gardens and Designed Landscapes in Scotland
- Official name: Taymouth Castle
- Designated: 30 June 1987
- Reference no.: GDL00354
- Location: Perth and Kinross, Kenmore, Scotland
- Coordinates: 56.594972°N 3.9810339°W
- Construction started: 1806
- Completed: 1842
- Client: John Campbell

Design and construction
- Architects: J and A Elliot

Taymouth Castle is situated to the north-east of the village of Kenmore, Perth and Kinross, in the Highlands of Scotland, in an estate which encompasses 450 acres (180 ha). It lies on the south bank of the River Tay, about 1 mile (1.6 km) from Loch Tay, in the heartland of the Grampian Mountains. The estate is bordered on two sides by mountain ranges, on the third by Loch Tay, and the fourth by the confluence of the rivers Lyon and Tay.

The castle stands on the site of Balloch Castle, which was built in 1552 as seat of the Campbells. In the early 19th century, Balloch Castle was demolished by the Campbells of Breadalbane to make way for a much larger castle that could be rebuilt on the site. The new castle's blue-grey stone was taken from the quarry at Bolfracks.

Taymouth Castle was built on a large scale in the neo-Gothic style. It is regarded one of the most important Scottish castles in private ownership. Its public rooms show examples of the 19th century craftmanship including carvings, plasterwork and murals. Panels of medieval stained glass and Renaissance woodwork were incorporated into the scheme. Much of this decor still survives.

Francis Bernasconi, acknowledged as the greatest designer of fine plasterwork of the era, created the central staircase, which connects all four storeys of the central tower. Many of the ceilings were painted by Cornelius Dixon.

The castle is a Category A listed building, and its grounds, which include parkland and woodland, are on the Inventory of Gardens and Designed Landscapes, the national listing of significant gardens. Historic Environment Scotland have graded the castle as "outstanding" for its artistic, historical, architectural and scenic value. It also recognises the site's horticultural value because of the remains of its pinetum and the size of its surviving trees. It is said that some of the first larches brought to Scotland from the Tyrol were planted on the estate.

Twelve of Taymouth Castle's buildings or structures are currently recorded on the Buildings at Risk Register for Scotland. Due to its severely deteriorating condition, Taymouth Castle has been empty since approximately 1982 but new owners planned to restore and redevelop the castle as a luxury hotel resort. The estate was acquired by Discovery Land Company in 2019 which decided to convert the main structure into "a luxury private members’ clubhouse".

The castle and golf course were closed during the restoration and re-modelling. The project, funded by American owners led by Michael Meldman, was completed in November 2024. The main structure was divided into nine suites to be occupied by members of a shared ownership plan.

== Features ==
=== Estate landmarks ===
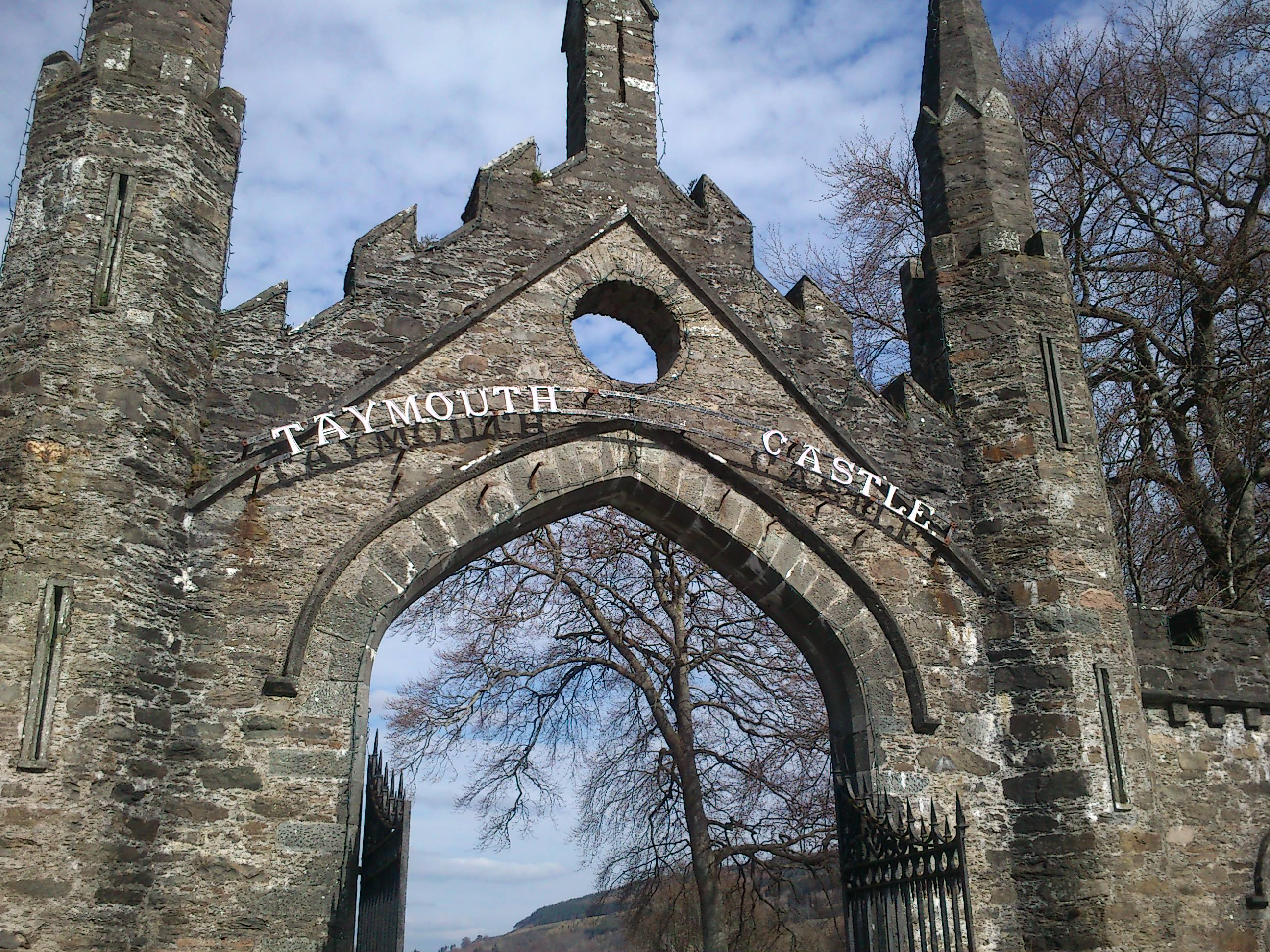
Taymouth Castle, Kenmore Gate entrance.

Among the landmarks that still survive on the 450-acre (180 ha) estate are:

- A ruined 19th-century circular tower, known as the Rock Lodge. This is a single-storey building, built around 1830, with a two-stage circular Gothic folly. It was originally habitable, despite being built to appear as a ruin.
- A derelict temple, known as Apollo's Temple. There is some evidence that this small circular building, which perhaps dates back to the 1770s, may have once housed a sculpture.
- A semi-circular folly, known as The Fort.
- Another temple, known as Maxwell's Temple. This temple, of an Eleanor cross type construction, was built in 1830 as a tribute to Mary, Countess of Breadalbane.
- A historic dairy, standing on Tom Mor in the castle's grounds and described as the 'House that Sparkles'. It glistens 'white' due to the quartz from which it is made, taken from the spur of Ben Lawers. When Queen Victoria visited the dairy in 1842, she turned the handle of a churn, sipped a glass of milk and ate an oatmeal bannock. She described the dairy as a kind of Swiss Cottage.
- A historic urn, known as The Monument.
- A ruined tower.

All of the above structures are listed with Historic Environment Scotland.

=== Taymouth Castle Golf Club ===
Taymouth Castle has its own 18-hole golf course, which was operated by the Taymouth Castle Golf Club. In 1925, the course was laid over the castle's former deer park and designed by the renowned golfer James Braid. As of April 2017, the course was closed while it was extended and re-modelled. At 6,066 yards (5,547 m), it was regarded as too short for modern championship golf courses and so is being increased to 7,039 yd (6,436 m). Also, much of Braid's original features disappeared over the last 90 years. These are being restored, with views of the River Tay also being introduced into the course.

In 1839, the deer park was said to contain approximately 700 fallow deer, 100 red deer, some black deer and some moose deer. There were also some wild Indian buffaloes, taken from the 'rocky mountains of the New World'.

=== Fly fishing ===
The castle offers 2.5 miles (4.0 km) of salmon fishing through the estate, on the River Tay. The estate also has fishing rights on Loch Tay, which contains pike, perch, roach and trout.

== Additional information ==
=== The Campbells of Breadalbane and Glenorchy ===
The first 12 owners of the Balloch/Taymouth Castle estate, who held the lands throughout its period of private ownership between 1550 and 1922, were all Campbells of the Clan Campbell and members of the Peerage of Scotland. In the usual way, the ownership of the estate (and the various titles) were generally passed from father to son, except when there were no male heirs. This particular branch of the Campbell family were given the titles of Breadalbane, an area in the Highlands of Scotland; and Glenorchy, a glen in Argyll and Bute.

A number of the Campbells were Earls of Breadalbane and Holland. The family were given the lands of Breadalbane and Lawers in the 15th century by King James III, for Sir Colin Campbell's help in capturing Thomas Chalmer, one of the assassins of King James I. The title of Holland refers to an area of Lincolnshire, England. The 1st Earl of Breadalbane and Holland married the 1st Earl of Holland's daughter, Lady Mary Rich. He therefore acquired the English title of Holland, through his wife. The 1st Earl of Holland was beheaded in London in 1649 for treason.

Sir Colin Campbell of Glenorchy, who built Balloch Castle in 1552, was a knight, the lowest rank of all of the owners of Balloch and Taymouth Castle. As time went on, his descendants' rank gradually increased, until the last Campbell listed, Sir Gavin Campbell, 1st Marquess of Breadalbane, until 1922, achieved the high rank of Marquess.

The Campbells of Breadalbane were incredibly powerful and influential, due to the vast amounts of land that they owned in Scotland. They were also involved in many of the violent events and battles during Scotland's historical clan feuds. They were thus highly feared by the other clans, for their determination to both increase their power and influence and to defend their estates at all costs, throughout this bloody period in Scotland's history. There was also a long-running feud between the Campbells and the Gregors, who later went on to become known as the MacGregors to whom the famous Rob Roy MacGregor belonged. More information about these events is detailed in the history sections below.

=== The Black Book of Taymouth ===
In 1855, the 2nd Marquess of Breadalbane allowed historical papers from the Breadalbane Charter Room to be published in printed form in a book called The Black Book of Taymouth. This book had in fact largely been written and compiled between 1598 and 1648 by William Bowie, although Cosmo Innes also contributed to the 1855 publication, which includes entries up to 1703. The book concentrates more on the history of the Central Highlands than that of the Breadalbane family, although this is referred to in the book.

The book is written in Scots, with Bowie dedicating his version of the book to Sir Duncan Campbell of Glenorchy, 1st Baronet Campbell, otherwise known as Black Duncan. Bowie was both the tutor to Duncan's children and the family scribe. The book has been reprinted a number of times, including in 2015.

=== Taymouth Castle ships ===
There have been at least three ships with the name Taymouth Castle. The first was a sailing vessel, built in 1851 by John Scott & Sons. The second was a three-masted 'fully rigged' sailing vessel, built in 1865, by Charles Connell & Company. This was wrecked in 1867, with the loss of all 19 crew and passengers on board, off the coast of Torr Head, County Antrim, Northern Ireland. There was also the Royal Mail steam ship Taymouth Castle, built in 1877 by Messrs Barclay Curle & Co. Despite having steam engines and a screw propeller, it also had two masts, giving it an early hybrid power source.

=== Witches and ghosts ===
There is an old tale surrounding a blue sapphire stone which is set into a ring belonging to the Grahams of Inchbrakie, Perthshire. Some time in the 17th century, the Laird of Inchbrakie witnessed a large crowd, headed by one of the Campbells of Glenorchy, who were preparing to drown a witch. The Laird recognised the victim as being Katherine Niven, his old nurse and subsequently did his best to try and save her. He was unsuccessful, but she was still grateful enough to throw him a blue sapphire stone for his efforts. She said that whilst the stone remained with him, he would always have good fortune and that the Campbells would not have a male heir. Both prophecies were said to have come true. If there is any element of truth in this tale, then it would seem that the Campbell who was leading the witch-hunt may have been Sir Colin Campbell, 2nd Baronet, who died childless in 1640.

Taymouth Castle is said to be haunted.

== Taymouth Castle history ==
The landowners of Taymouth Castle, together with dates of ownership and significant events are shown here. Details of Balloch Castle and its ancestral owners, which was demolished in 1806 and replaced by Taymouth Castle are shown further down.

=== John Campbell, 1st Marquess of Breadalbane (1782–1834) ===
John Campbell inherited the title of 4th Earl of Breadalbane and Holland at the age of 19, from his third cousin, who was John Campbell, 3rd Earl of Breadalbane and Holland. In 1789, he called upon Robert Mylne to prepare plans for a new "chateau", although these plans were never carried out. It is said that he wanted to demolish Balloch Castle and build a new grander castle in its place, in order to overshadow the Duke of Argyll's castle at Inveraray.

However, 10 years later, he did completely transform the castle, using many architects, including Alexander Nasmyth. The main block of the old house was demolished, to be replaced from 1806, by a Gothic building, to the designs of the brothers James and Archibald Elliot. The English-Italian Francis Bernasconi carried out the ornate plasterwork of the staircase and drawing rooms between 1809 and 1812. In 1818, the old east wing was pulled down and replaced by a two-storey wing designed by William Atkinson. Stained glass was supplied by William Raphael Eginton. Circa 1816, he described it thus:

Baron's Hall Window, 20 Feet by 14, Figures of the 10 first Lords of Glenurquay, in their proper Costume, with the Badges and Heraldic Bearings, Family Arms, with Crests, Supporters, &c.; the Portraits from an illuminated MSS.

In 1793, John Campbell formed three regiments of fencibles, known as the Breadalbane Fencibles to help defend the land in time of need. He managed to raise 2,300 men, of whom 1,600 were from his own estate. At one time, the castle also had its own fire brigade.

In 1819, Prince Leopold, the future king of Belgium, visited the castle and was welcomed by more than two thousand Highlanders. A royal salute was fired from the battery and the pipers were playing 'Phaill Phranse', the Prince's Welcome. During his stay, the Marquess assembled 1,400 of his tenants and held a grand gala, with entertainment and 'copious libations of porter and whiskey'.

In 1823, J. C. Loudon described Taymouth as the 'most magnificent residence in the country ... The mountain, lawn and banks of the waters, are richly clothed with wood, through which are led magnificent walks. Of trees, the lime and larches have attained to a great size, and there is an avenue of the former 450 yards in length, scarcely equalled anywhere.'

The 4th Earl was created 1st Marquess of Breadalbane in 1831, but died in 1834. He was described as having unostentatious habits, devoting much of his time to the improvement of his 'princely' estates.

=== John Campbell, 2nd Marquess of Breadalbane (1834–1862) ===
John Campbell, 2nd Marquess of Breadalbane, inherited the estate, on the death of his father in 1834. During his lifetime he was Lord Glenorchy, Earl of Ormerlie and an MP for both Okehampton and Perthshire. He also became a Knight of the Thistle, a Knight of the Black Eagle of Prussia, Lord Lieutenant of Argyllshire and President of the Society of Antiquaries of Scotland. Records show that as well as his estates in Scotland, he owned Breadalbane House in Park Lane, London.

The 2nd Marquess continued with the improvements to the castle by the remodelling of William Adam's west wing, which was enlarged and refaced to match the main block. This time, the architect was James Gillespie Graham, with interiors designed by A. W. N. Pugin. The ceilings of the west wing are described by Historic Scotland as the "finest of their period in the UK". It took an Italian painter nearly ten years to paint the ceilings with the various coats of arms of the Breadalbane family and their flags. He painted them lying on his back in rope slings. Ore smelting equipment was also installed into the West Wing, to smelt the specimens of ore that were occasionally found on the Breadalbane estates. The Marquess was hoping to find enough valuable minerals to pay for the huge cost of rebuilding the castle.

Records show that the Marquess was paid £6,630 in compensation by the British government in 1833, upon the abolition of slavery, in regard to his Hope Estate in Jamaica. Records also show that he is responsible for re-introducing the capercaillie to Great Britain at Taymouth Castle, after the original stock became extinct in this country in around 1785. Our present population is descended from the 28 birds that he introduced from Sweden in 1837–38. These, in turn, were descended from earlier Scottish birds.

In 1839, the Marquess entertained a succession of noblemen at the castle. They included Lord and Lady Seymour, the Earl of Ashburnham, Lord Stuart de Rothesay and Lord and Lady Hatherton.

In 1840, more noble guests stayed at the castle, including the Duke and Duchess of St Albans, the Earl and Countess of Camperdown, Lady Elizabeth Duncan, future Prime Minister Lord Haddo, the Earl and Countess of Cadogan and the Ladies Augusta and Honoria Cadogan.

The works to the castle were complete by 1842, just in time for the first visit to Scotland by the 'youthful' Queen Victoria and Prince Albert, when they stayed at Taymouth for three days. On their arrival, the castle's heavy guns fired off a royal salute, with over 200 traditionally-armed highlanders there to receive them. They were duly entertained with 'lavish pomp' and it was remarked that the scene would need the pen of a poet to give any justice to the splendour. In the evening, 50,000 lamps were lit on a slope outside the castle, arranged in such a fashion as they formed the words "Welcome Victoria and Albert". Apparently, their stay cost Campbell £60,000, whilst at the time, he was said to have an annual rental income of £45,000.

Later during their stay, the Queen was rowed up Loch Tay from Killin, whilst Prince Albert rode out on a stag hunt over the estate. Even then, the estate extended for 100 miles from Aberfeldy to Oban. The Prince's personal tally that morning was 19 roe deer, 4 1/2 brace of black game, 3 brace of grouse, 1 brace of the newly re-introduced capercaillie, 1 wood pigeon and 12 hares. Prince Albert was the first to be allowed to shoot the capercaillies, which were being so strictly preserved.

Before leaving the castle, the Queen and Prince Albert planted four ceremonial trees, on a spot just to the east of the castle. They were two Scotch Firs and two oak trees. Twenty-four years later, the Queen who was by then a widow, stopped by anonymously. She wrote in her journal, "Here, unknown and quite in private, I gazed, not without deep inward emotion, on the scene of our reception, twenty-four years ago".

John Campbell died childless in Lausanne, Switzerland in 1862 and all of his titles died with him. The estate then passed to his distant cousin (fourth cousin twice removed), John Campbell, who became the 6th Earl of Breadalbane and Holland.

=== John Alexander Gavin Campbell, 6th Earl of Breadalbane and Holland (1862–1871) ===
Upon the death of the 2nd Marquess of Breadalbane, there were two claimants to the estates and remaining titles. Both were only distantly related to the 2nd Marquess and could never have imagined that they could ultimately inherit. John Alexander Gavin Campbell of Glenfalloch's claim was disputed by Lieutenant Charles William Campbell of Borland. The dispute ultimately hinged on whether J A G Campbell's grandparents were legally married, and therefore the legitimacy of his father. There was apparently very little evidence on this fact, other than a letter written by his grandmother stating that they were married in 1782. However, it was ultimately decided that the marriage must have taken place, as J A G Campbell's claim was eventually ratified by the Scottish Court of Session. On appeal, this ruling was confirmed by a vote of two-to-one in the House of Lords.

John Campbell had four children from his marriage to Mary Theresa Edwards. He gained the rank of captain in the service of the 1st Royals.

He died at the age of 46 at The Albany, Piccadilly, London.

=== Sir Gavin Campbell, 1st Marquess of Breadalbane (1871–1922) ===
Gavin Campbell, 1st Marquess of Breadalbane, served as a lieutenant in the 4th Battalion, Argyll and Sutherland Highlanders. He also served in the House of Lords as a liberal politician. During his lifetime he amassed a number of titles and honours including; Knight of St John of Jerusalem, Knight of the Garter, Baronet of Nova Scotia, Baron Breadalbane, Lord of Glenorchy, Benederloch, Ormelie and Weick, Viscount Tay and Paintland, Earl of Ormelie and Marquess of Breadalbane. He was also a County Councillor in both Perth and Argyll, a Deputy Lieutenant of Argyll, a Privy Councillor, Keeper of the Privy Seal of Scotland, Lord High Commissioner to the General Assembly of the Church of Scotland, Lord-in-waiting to Queen Victoria, Treasurer and Lord Steward of the Royal Household and an ADC to His Majesty.

In 1872, he married Lady Alma Imogene Graham, daughter of the 4th Duke of Montrose.

In 1877, Prince Arthur, Duke of Connaught and Strathearn, visited the castle. In the same year, Prince Leopold, Duke of Albany, who was the youngest son of Queen Victoria, also visited.

In December 1879, the former prime minister William Gladstone stayed at Taymouth Castle for three days, whilst on a speech-making tour of Scotland. The tour was said to be an unusual event, as in those days it was pretty unheard of for a leading politician to 'stump' the country in this way. It was described as 'an American-style election campaign'. In the same year, Frederick I, Grand Duke of Baden, also visited the castle.

Sir Gavin started the Lock Tay Steamboat Company, to enable his tenants to travel more easily to the nearest railway station, on a vessel known as the Queen of the Lake. Later, the enterprise was transformed into a popular attraction, operating pleasure cruises between Kenmore and Killin. Eventually, the ship was taken over by British Railways.

In 1881, the castle had another royal visitor, being Prince George, Duke of Cambridge. Later in 1884, King Oscar II of Sweden visited and in the following year, the Prince Frederick of Hanover visited the castle.

In 1888, Sir Gavin was awarded the Medal of the Royal Humane Society, for saving the life of a servant, whilst at the imminent risk to his own life. The servant, by the name of McLean, had fallen out of a boat and into the River Tay. At the time, the river was flooded and McLean was caught in a deep whirlpool, with eddies and rocks creating even more difficulties. Sir Gavin, who was out shooting at the time, stripped off his gunbelt and dived into the river to rescue him. The medal he earned for this, along with five more of his medals, were sold at auction in 2009 for £2,700.

Sir Gavin was also awarded the Swedish Order of the Seraphim, conferred upon him by King Oscar, for his hospitality to the then Prince Gustavus Adolphus, when he came to the UK to marry Princess Margaret of Connaught in 1905.

When he inherited his titles in 1871, his estate was still nearly half a million acres in size. It contained 'The Heart of Scotland', a thick wood of fir trees in the shape of a heart. Unfortunately, throughout Sir Gavin's tenure at Taymouth, he managed to lose most of this land. His worsening financial problems, were said to be due to an extravagant lifestyle, "bad management and his gambling addiction". His mountainous debts finally forced him to put the castle and its remaining 60,000 acres up for sale in 1920. Included in the sale were a number of farms, hotels, private houses and shooting and fishing rights. The sale was achieved in 1921, when the castle was sold for £20,000 to a syndicate, who intended to turn the estate into a hotel complex. However, the completion date was set for May 1922 and the Campbells continued to reside in the castle for the time being.

The father of the Scottish writer Fred Urquhart was chauffeur to the Marquess in the early twentieth century, and Urquhart's novel Palace of Green Days (1979) draws on his childhood memories of this.

In March 1922, the Marquess and Marchioness duly said farewell to the castle forever, after fifty years of occupation, and moved out to their other home in Craig, Dalmally.

Sir Gavin died childless, very shortly afterwards, in October 1922 and most of his titles died with him. However, even though every last acre of the original half a million acre estate had been sold off, there were still three more Earls of Breadalbane and Holland. The tenth and last Earl was John Romer Boreland Campbell, who died childless in 1995. Following his death, the title has remained dormant.

=== Taymouth Castle Hotel Company Ltd (1922–1940) ===
At the time of their purchase, the hotel company from Glasgow, which included the MacTaggart family, also bought 520 acres of adjoining land, which brought the estate back to around 2,000 acres. It was declared by the company that they intended to convert the castle into a hydropathic hotel, along with opening a brand new golf course on its lands. The company also acquired fishing rights on Loch Tay and part of the River Tay and shooting rights on Drumhill. At the same time, there was a huge auction at the castle, in which all of its furniture and effects were sold. The newspaper article reporting the event, said that 'the things that gave the castle its life and history, will be scattered to the four winds of heaven'. The auction realised total sales of £24,000, with half of that amount being paid by the new hotel owners, to retain furniture in the castle.

The hydro hotel opened on 30 June 1923, boasting around 100 bedrooms. Since buying the castle, its facilities had been greatly improved, including central heating and electricity being installed throughout. The hotel also offered music and dancing, a grass riding track and had four en tout cas tennis courts and a covered badminton court. They possessed a fleet of motor vehicles, offering drives to places of interest and steamer excursions on Loch Tay. The golf course had been finished and there was of course fly fishing. At the time of opening, they hadn't quite managed to offer shooting, but they had the shooting rights for Drummond Hill, on which 30 stags had been killed in the previous year.

Despite good patronage, the Taymouth Castle Hotel Company Ltd were forced into voluntary liquidation in March 1926. The blame was put on the high cost of all the alterations necessary to convert the castle. It was disclosed that as there were good Easter bookings, the hotel would remain open for the time being. The hotel eventually closed for the winter on 30 September 1926, with the liquidators having already sold off portions of the lands, dramatically reducing the size of the estate.

The hotel reopened on 1 June 1927, for the summer season. The advertised rate was 18s to 25s per person per day. In September 1927, the Prince and Princess Gin Ri of Korea visited the castle. Whilst at that time a colony of Japan, the prince was the son of the late Emperor of Korea and the princess was a cousin of the Empress of Japan.

The following year the hotel reopened for the 1928 season and its long-term future was secured, when the castle was bought by a 'well known London combine'. The new owners declared that the castle would continue as a 'hydro'.

=== Taymouth Castle Hospital (1940–1948) ===
After the outbreak of the Second World War, use of the castle was requisitioned by the War Office, to help with the war effort. From 1940, it became known as the No. 1 Polish General Hospital, or otherwise as the Taymouth Castle Hospital. It was the chief Polish hospital in the country and boasted some of the finest and most up-to-date equipment, with its operating theatres and X-Ray machines.

Also, in April 1940, the castle advertised that the golf course and Policy Parks were available for let, for sheep and cattle grazing. It was later noted that despite having its own golf course, the wounded Polish servicemen showed no interest in golf, although they were enthusiastic footballers.

Over the eight years of its use as a hospital, thousands of Polish patients were treated there, with its biggest influx after the battle of Cassino, when over 200 Polish casualties arrived. At its height, it had 1,200 beds and 200 staff. Despite still being under the control of the War Office, its use as a hospital came to an end in December 1947, with the remaining Polish patients being dispersed to hospitals in England.

The chairman of the owning hotel company said that he thought that it would be a year or two before the castle could be re-opened as a hotel. He said that the lack of tradesmen would be a big obstacle to its redecoration and renovation. Severe damage to one of the west towers, from a fire in 1946, would also have to be repaired. However, during its time as a hospital, care had been taken to protect the castle's magnificent carved oak walls and doors. These had been boarded up, using cardboard and plywood. Similar precautions had been taken to protect the marble mantelpieces and stained glass windows.

Seventy-five Nissen huts were removed from the castle grounds; however, their foundations can still be seen today.

=== Civil Defence Corps training school (1949–1968) ===
In February 1949, the government formed the Civil Defence Corps, which was a civilian volunteer organisation, which could take control of areas of the country in times of national emergency, such as after a nuclear attack. In a joint announcement by the Home Office and the Scottish Office, it was declared that Taymouth Castle was to be used as one of three training centres in Scotland, which would teach instructors in how to train a much bigger volunteer force. Alterations were made to the castle, which was designed to train between 100 and 150 men and women at a time. The cost of these alterations was finally put at £126,000, way past its original budget of £75,700.

When it was opened in December 1950 by the Scottish Secretary Hector McNeil, it was described as the most up-to-date in the world. The centre also included a mock 'blitzed village', for trainees to practice in. The village was built and then partially demolished, to provide defense volunteers with practical rescue training. Roofs were said to lie at 'drunken angles', walls gaped open, timber beams were scorched with fire; and all laid out to conform with Scottish types of architecture. The village was so realistic that the visiting Sir James Henderson-Stewart, Under-Secretary of State for Scotland said that there was a staggering contrast between the beauty of the castle and the scenes of ruin, bringing home more forcibly the devastation of war and the need to be ready for any emergency.

As part of their training, the volunteers were given advanced instruction in atomic, chemical and biological warfare.

By 1956, the Corps had grown to 330,000 personnel. However, the Corps was eventually disbanded in 1968, after a change of thinking in how to deal with nuclear attacks. However, its role in national defence didn't end there. From 1968, it was also one of the designated locations for plan PYTHON, the plan for continuity of government in the event of nuclear war. The plan, which was classified as TOP SECRET, was that in the event of a nuclear attack, the government and other essential personnel could be dispersed around the country, to secret and protected locations. Taymouth Castle was chosen as one of these sites.

It is not known when Taymouth Castle ceased to be considered as one of these secret locations, but the three associated CalMac support ships, which were capable of acting as floating nuclear bunkers, were sold by CalMac in the 1980s. These ships operated from day-to-day as normal commercial car ferries, but had been designed and built in such a way that if needed, they could be used as radiation resistant transport and decontamination chambers.

=== Speech and drama school (1982) ===
In September 1981, it was advertised that the Taymouth Castle Residential School of Speech and Drama was starting classes in January 1982. Auditions were being held for three courses, which were a one-year Stage course, a two-year Diploma and Stage course and a one-year course in puppetry.

At this time, nothing further is known about those courses, but the castle is known to have been closed and empty since around that time.

The golf course continued to be operated separately, but this too is currently closed, whilst alterations are being made to the course.

=== Restoration plans (1982–date) ===
Despite its many changes of use and its requisitioning by the government, through the war years and beyond, legal ownership of the castle was still retained by the MacTaggart family, who had first turned the castle into a hotel in 1922. However, they had been unable to make any real commercial use of the castle since the boarding school for children of American servicemen closed in 1979. Throughout the 1990s, the family had been unsuccessfully trying to sell the estate, with Madonna and Cher both being reported to be interested. In 1995, the castle and estate were on the market for £5.5m.

By the year 2000, the castle was suffering badly from leaks and rot. It was eventually sold to a building consortium in 2005 for £12m. At the time of purchase, plans to redevelop the castle as a "six-star" hotel with 150 rooms had already been approved by Perth and Kinross Council. However, since then, due to the huge costs involved and the need to find suitable investment, progress has been slow, with work starting and stalling. Millions of pounds have already been spent in preventing further deterioration of the castle and upon its ongoing conversion. By May 2006, the main buildings were stabilised, with further restoration continuing in the following years. These included new windows, extensive refurbishment to the state rooms and a new roof.

Despite the difficulties in completing the project, one of the developers said in 2008 that: "We have spent millions of pounds saving one of Scotland's finest, most beautiful properties and we are proud of that. The east wing and the west wing were totally derelict and the seven principal rooms have been saved, all under the watchful eye of Historic Scotland."

By 2015, work began on hotel suites under the banner of Taymouth Castle Estate. By 2016, enough work had been completed at the castle for it to operate as an events centre, hosting a number of weddings, corporate events and banquets. In October 2016, an Open Day was held at the castle, to promote it further as a wedding venue for 2017.

By 2018, previously-proposed plans for the restoration of the castle had foundered due to concerns about ownership and a possible connection to money-laundering The castle's ownership has passed through a number of unclear entities, including offshore accounts, but was believed to reside in the hands of Ali Ibrahim Dabaiba, the former chief of development for former Libyan dictator Muammar Gaddafi. The post-Gaddafi Libyan government requested the help of the UK authorities over what they described as Dahaiba's theft of government funds invested in multiple properties in Scotland, including Taymouth Castle. The company that had been the prime contractor had stopped work on the project by April, 2018, after a tax probe by HM Revenue and Customs and Companies House began the process to remove the company's listing and force it into dissolution. Further complicating development attempts, Scottish attorney Stephen Jones was convicted of diverting money the Scottsdale, Arizona-based upscale residential community developer Discovery Land Company (DLC) had sent to purchase the property. DLC was later able to finalize a deal to assume ownership, although specific development plans have not yet been disclosed.

== Early history of Balloch Castle ==
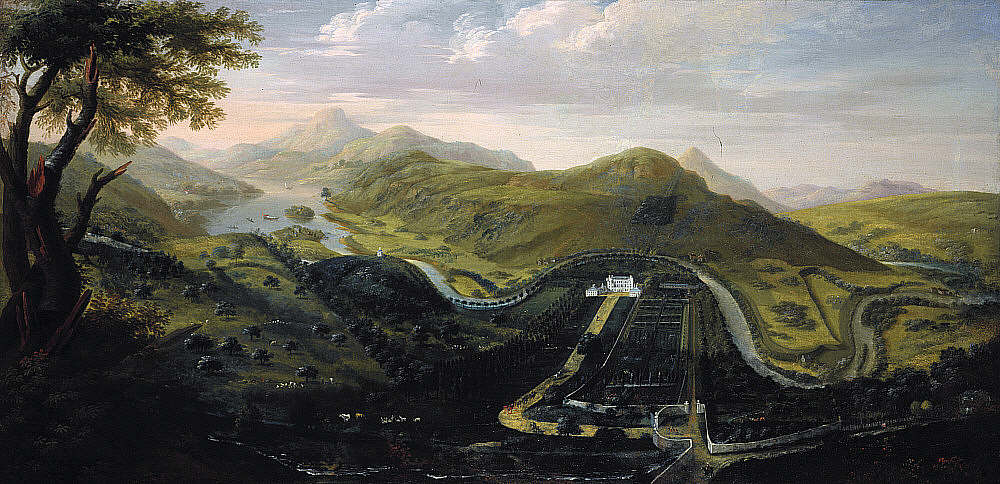
Taymouth Castle painted in 1733 by James Norie, showing William Adam's improvements to the house and gardens

The landowners of Balloch Castle, together with dates of ownership and significant events are shown below:-

=== Sir Colin Campbell of Glenorchy (1550–1583) ===
Sir Colin Campbell of Glenorchy, otherwise known as 'Grey Colin' because of his white hair and long flowing beard, became laird of Glenorchy upon the death of his older brother John, in 1550. One of his first actions as laird, was to evict the Clan Gregor from Balloch (now Kenmore), at the east end of Loch Tay. In 1552, he consolidated his position and built a tower house there, known as Balloch Castle. Balloch means 'the house at the narrow pass'. Sir Colin is said to have chosen the site of the castle in a novel manner. He was apparently instructed in a dream to found the castle on the spot where he first heard a blackbird sing, whilst making his way down the strath of the Tay.

Later, in 1787, Robert Burns described the beauty of Balloch Castle and its surrounding lands in verse:

The Tay meandering sweet in infant pride,
The Palace rising on its verdant side,
The lawns, wood fringed, in Nature's native taste,
The hillocks dropped in Nature's native haste...

The castle was the seat of Clan Campbell whose lands, at the height of their powers, extended over 100 miles from Taymouth to the west coast of Scotland. Another source quotes their estate as encompassing 437,696 acres. Sir Colin rapidly expanded his territory during his lifetime, also building or enlarging several castles.

There was a long-running feud between the Campbells and the Gregor clan, over the lands said to have been seized by the Campbells from them. This bitter and violent feud ran from 1562 until 1569, when their clan chief Gregor Roy, 10th Chief MacGregor, was captured by Sir Colin whilst visiting his wife. On 7 April 1570, after securing the consent of the Regent Morton, Sir Colin personally beheaded Gregor at Balloch Castle, in the presence of the Earl of Atholl, the Justice Clerk. Gregor's wife, Marion Campbell, who also witnessed her husband's execution, wrote a bitter lament about the affair, called 'Griogal Cridhe'. This has been described as 'Surely one of the greatest poems ever made in Britain'. The fighting continued on until 1570, even more bloody than before, with the Gregor Clan determined to avenge their chief's death. However, a settlement was finally reached between the two clans in the winter of 1570.

Sir Colin claimed to have 'the power of pit and gallows', which was the right to imprison and execute. In the Black Book of Taymouth, Sir Colin was described as a great 'justiciar' of his time, who sustained the deadly feud with the Gregor clan and executed many notable lymmars (rogues).

James VI visited Balloch Castle in August 1582, tipping the gardener 40 shillings. However, only a few days later, the king was seized at the Ruthven Raid.

Sir Colin had 10 children from two marriages, dying in April 1583.

=== Sir Duncan Campbell of Glenorchy, 1st Baronet Campbell (1583–1631) ===
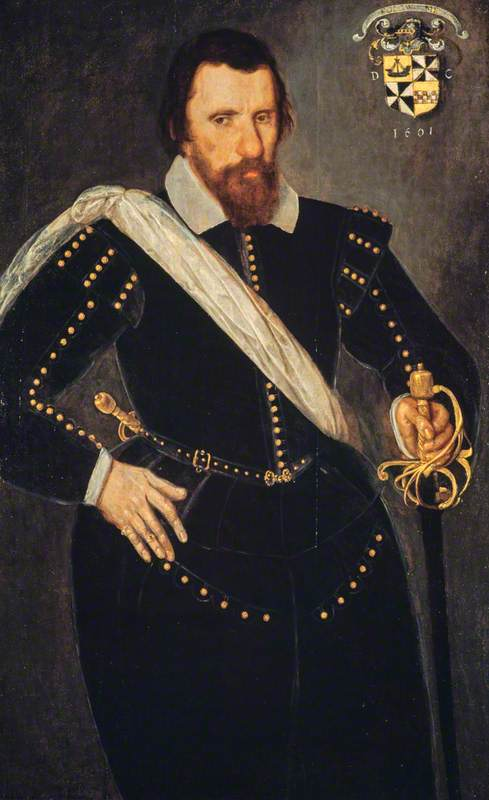
Duncan Campbell of Glenorchy (1545-1631)

Duncan Campbell was knighted in 1590, was declared MP for Argyllshire in 1593 and held the office of Hereditary Sheriff of Perthshire for life. He was also created 1st Baronet Campbell of Nova Scotia, in 1625. Sir Duncan had 23 children from three marriages, dying in 1631. It is said that he married a low-born lady as his second wife, but quickly regretted it. The traditional tale is that he had her locked in an underground vault, whilst he courted Elizabeth Sinclair, the daughter of the 5th Lord Sinclair. Wary that he might already be married, Elizabeth made him swear that he had no other wife and he solemnly swore on the cross of his sword that he 'had no wife above ground'. She did not realise the deception and they were indeed married. His other wife was ultimately released from the vault, after she had made a declaration that she was not his wife.

He had several nicknames, the first being 'Duncan of the (seven) Castles', as he was renowned for building them. His other nickname was 'Black Duncan'. He had been appointed by the King to keep the peace between the feuding clans in Argyll and Perthshire and was accordingly allowed to maintain a large force of armed soldiers to support him. However, he had a reputation for causing trouble, rather than stopping it and was said to be more interested in using his power to acquire extra land for himself. During his lifetime, he therefore managed to significantly enlarge the family's estate, by 'fair means or foul'. He also extended Balloch Castle.

On 1 August 1598, Glenorchy wrote to the English politician Sir Robert Cecil with thanks to Queen Elizabeth after his audience with the diplomat George Nicholson. Glenorchy sent his secretary John Archibald to London. It was hoped Glenorchy would help the English in Ireland.

In April 1603, King James VI and I outlawed the Clan Gregor, following the Battle of Glen Fruin, in which the Gregors killed between 200 and 300 men of the Clan Colquhoun. The name Gregor or MacGregor was abolished and it became entirely legal to kill anyone of that name and seize his property. Over the next ten years, over 100 Gregors were slain and their lands given to the Campbells. It was said that Sir Duncan was instrumental in this and got most of their leaders killed or hanged.

One of Sir Duncan's castles was Finlarig Castle, built in 1629. There is a pit in the courtyard, which can still be seen, where nobles were taken from the castle dungeons, through an underground passage, to be beheaded under the watchful gaze of Sir Duncan's men. Commoners were hanged from a nearby oak tree. The beheading axe was later put on display at Taymouth Castle, until it was finally turned into a hotel in 1922.

Sir Duncan was also said to be an astute manager of his estate. Not only did he build and repair castles, he also introduced livestock and planted woodlands. He ordered Drummond Hill to be planted with oak, birch and pine, creating Scotland's first managed forest.

=== Sir Colin Campbell of Glenorchy, 2nd Baronet Campbell (1631–1640) ===
In comparison with his father, Sir Colin Campbell, 2nd Baronet Campbell, also the 8th Laird of Glenorchy, was a much more peaceful character and was known as a patron of the arts. As well as repairing and extending the family castles, including Balloch Castle, he also employed several famous artists to paint portraits for them, including George Jamesone. He also travelled extensively and was a collector of fine furniture and paintings. He employed a silk weaver from Antwerp, Nicolas Herman, who had set up his workshop in Perth, to make silk fringes and passementerie for his furnishings and clothes.

Sir Colin was married for many years, but died childless, in 1640. He did however, foster Archibald Campbell, 9th Earl of Argyll. Archibald Campbell was ultimately executed in 1685, like his father, on the Maiden in Edinburgh. He faced his execution with calmness and good humour, joking on the scaffold that the guillotine, as his "inlet to glory" was "the sweetest maiden he had ever kissed".

=== Sir Robert Campbell of Glenorchy, 3rd Baronet Campbell (1640–1657) ===
Brother of the 2nd Baronet, he was also known as Robert Campbell of Glenfalloch. He was MP for Argyllshire between 1639 and 1641 and from 1643 to 1649.

Sir Robert lived through one of the stormiest and most trying periods in Highland history, during which time his estates were laid waste during the Scottish Civil War, by the 1st Marquess of Montrose and his Royalist forces. The Black Book of Taymouth states that in 1644 and 1645, his whole lands and estates, between the Ford of Lyon and the Point of Lesmore were burned and destroyed. These actions left Campbell with huge debts.

One of the key battles was the Battle of Inverlochy in 1645, which came shortly after Montrose had raided through the Taymouth area. Montrose had decided to attack the Covenanter forces which were under the command of Sir Duncan Campbell of Auchinbreck. The Campbell army were routed and of its 2,000 men, about 1,500 were killed during a running battle over 14 miles of countryside. Their commander, Auchinbreck, was captured and beheaded by Alasdair Mac Colla, who commanded part of the Royalist forces. Although they won this battle, Montrose suffered a heavy defeat seven months later at the Battle of Philiphaugh and his forces were ultimately crushed five years later, at the Battle of Carbisdale.

Sir Robert had 16 children from his marriage with Isabel MacIntosh, dying in 1657.

=== Sir John Campbell of Glenorchy, 4th Baronet Campbell (1657–1677) ===
Sir John Campbell was Commissioner of Supply and Excise for Argyll and Perth and succeeded to the title of 4th Baronet Campbell, of Glenorchy. He gained the rank of Colonel in the service of the Perthshire of Foot and was MP for Argyllshire between 1661 and 1663.

He had 31 children from three wives and died in 1677.

=== John Campbell, 1st Earl of Breadalbane and Holland (1677–1717) ===
John Campbell, known as 'Slippery John', was created 1st Earl of Breadalbane and Holland in 1681. In 1692, he played a key role in the Massacre of Glencoe, by instructing a relative, Robert Campbell of Glenlyon, to carry it out. 38 McDonalds from the Clan McDonald of Glencoe were killed by their own guests and another 40 women and children died of exposure, after their homes were burned.

Campbell also took part in the abortive royalist uprising under John Campbell, 1st Earl of Loudoun in 1654 and was also implicated in the Montgomery Plot, a Jocobite scheme to restore King James II and VII to the thrones of England and Scotland. In 1692, he was imprisoned for a time in Edinburgh Castle for his involvement in negotiations between Jacobite chiefs. However, he was released after it was discovered that he was acting with the knowledge of King William III.

In 1672, Campbell acquired as payment of debts, the estates and titles of George Sinclair, 6th Earl of Caithness, which included the parish of Wick and the castles of Girnigoe, Ackergill and Keiss. He assumed the title of Earl of Caithness, although his right to these titles and lands were disputed by George Sinclair of Keiss, first cousin to the 6th Earl of Caithness. Sinclair lay siege to Girnigoe Castle, damaging it so badly that it has never been inhabited since. In a counter-attack, Campbell took his army and marched on Sinclair, to fight what was to become known as the Battle of Altimarlach. Campbell's force easily routed Sinclair's army, whose men fled across the River Wick. But, a large number were killed and it is said that so many lay slain, that Campbell's soldiers were able to cross the river over their bodies, without getting their feet wet. Despite this strategic victory, George Sinclair later won his argument in court in 1681 and claimed the title of Earl of Caithness and the lands. However, Campbell was compensated for the loss of these, by King Charles II and the Privy Council of Scotland elevating him to Lord of Glenorchy, Benederaloch, Ormelie and Wick, Viscount of Tay and Paintland, and 1st Earl of Breadalbane and Holland.

It was here that Campbell's piper composed the clan's famous pibroch, 'Bodach na Briogais', which ridicules the Sinclairs. The event is also commemorated in the famous song 'The Campbells are Coming'. Many people refer to the Battle of Altimarlach as the last clan battle in Scotland and it would seem that it was the last true clan battle. However, in 1689 there was a later fierce battle at Mullroy, Kilmonivaig, when the Macdonalds of Keppoch fought and defeated the MacIntoshes, over ownership of Glen Roy. However, the MacIntoshes had government support and part of their army was made up of government troops, making it more of a government action than a true clan battle.

It is said that the people of Wick, hated Campbell so much that they caused him no end of trouble. Wearied by these incessant vexations, he divided Wick into 62 portions in 1690 and sold them all.

At one time, King William III entrusted Campbell with £20,000, a huge sum of money, to use it to achieve peace between some warring Highland Chiefs. However, rather than spend the money, he managed to negotiate a deal between them. When asked to account for the £20,000, he replied "Gentlemen - the money is spent, the Highlands are at peace, and that is the only way of accounting among friends".

An early fan of golf, Slippery John is recorded as buying a pair of golf clubs for his children in 1672 and having one club repaired at a cost of four shillings.

The Black Book of Taymouth, the history of the Breadalbanes, published by the 2nd Marquess of Breadalbane states that in 1681, Gilleasba, chief of the MacDonalds of Keppoch, gave a bond of manrent to Sir John, promising that none of his clan or his people would commit robbery on his lands. In 1715, Campbell sent 500 of his men to join the Earl of Mar in his Jacobite uprising against the new king, George I.

Campbell had four children from three marriages, dying in 1717. Shortly before his death, he was described by a Government agent by the name of Mackay in this way; "He has the gravity of a Spaniard, is as cunning as a fox, wise as a serpent, and is as slippery as an eel".

=== John Campbell, 2nd Earl of Breadalbane and Holland (1717–1752) ===
In 1720, John Campbell, 2nd Earl of Breadalbane and Holland, commissioned William Adam to remodel the castle and lay out extensive formal gardens. Adam's design included six radiating avenues, each over a mile long, which converged on the castle. Elaborate gardens and orchards were also planted on both sides of the Castle. To the south, Adam planted an avenue of trees in the shape of a D. On the banks of the river, he planted two long avenues of lime trees. These are known as the North and South Terraces.

In 1739, Jan Griffer was brought in to make further changes to the gardens. The long radiating avenues were removed and some new pavilions were built. Griffer also planted a lot more individual trees, which made the overall design of the castle less formal. Further changes that John Campbell made during his lifetime were the removal of the formal gardens, the remaining avenue and part of the terrace. He also moved the orchard to the west of the ridge where the Dairy now stands and moved the walled-garden to the north-east of the castle. He also planted woodland on Drummond Hill and Craig Hill.

John Campbell was Lord Lieutenant of Perthshire. During the Jacobite rising of 1745, it was said that he sent a thousand men into the field to fight. He had three children from his marriage to Henrietta Villiers, dying in 1752.

=== John Campbell, 3rd Earl of Breadalbane and Holland (1752–1782) ===
Later, John Campbell, 3rd Earl of Breadalbane and Holland, oversaw further changes in the 1750s, including building a bridge over the River Tay and also Kenmore's church, which dates from 1760, replacing the earlier church of 1579. By the 1780s, the formal gardens had been replaced with a picturesque landscape in the manner of Stourhead and Painshill Park. The main road had been moved to halfway up Taymouth Hill and the entrance drive re-aligned.

John was Lord of the Admiralty and an ambassador to the Danish and Russian courts. He had four children from his two marriages, dying in 1782. However, he had no surviving male heir and so his direct line ended, with the title 4th Earl of Breadalbane and Holland going to his third cousin, John Campbell, 1st Marquess of Breadalbane. The 1st Marquess went on to demolish Balloch Castle and build Taymouth Castle in its place.

== Gallery ==
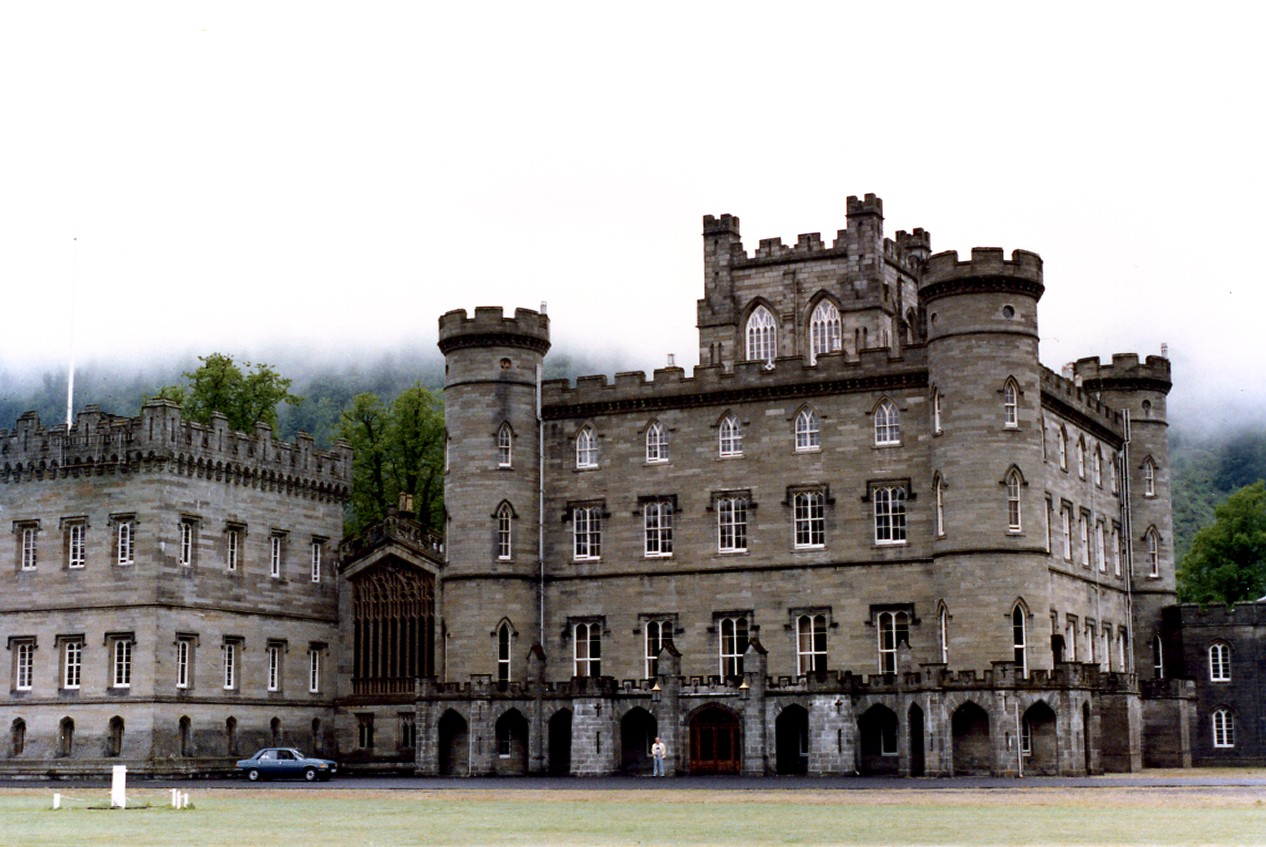
View from the south

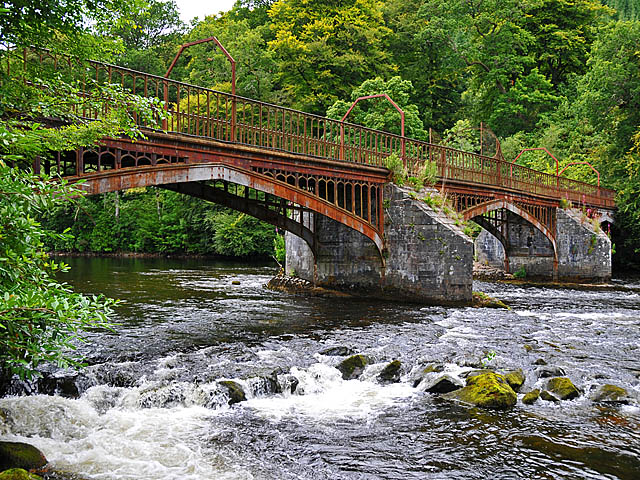
Chinese bridge

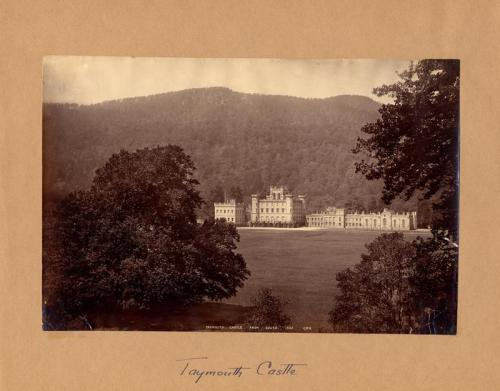
View of castle - Photographic print
