= Sir John Campbell, 4th Baronet =

Scottish nobleman (c. 1615 – c. 1670)

Sir John Campbell, 4th Baronet of Glenorchy (c. 1615 – c. 1670) was a Scottish nobleman and the father of John Campbell, 1st Earl of Breadalbane, a notorious political leader implicated in the Massacre of Glencoe.

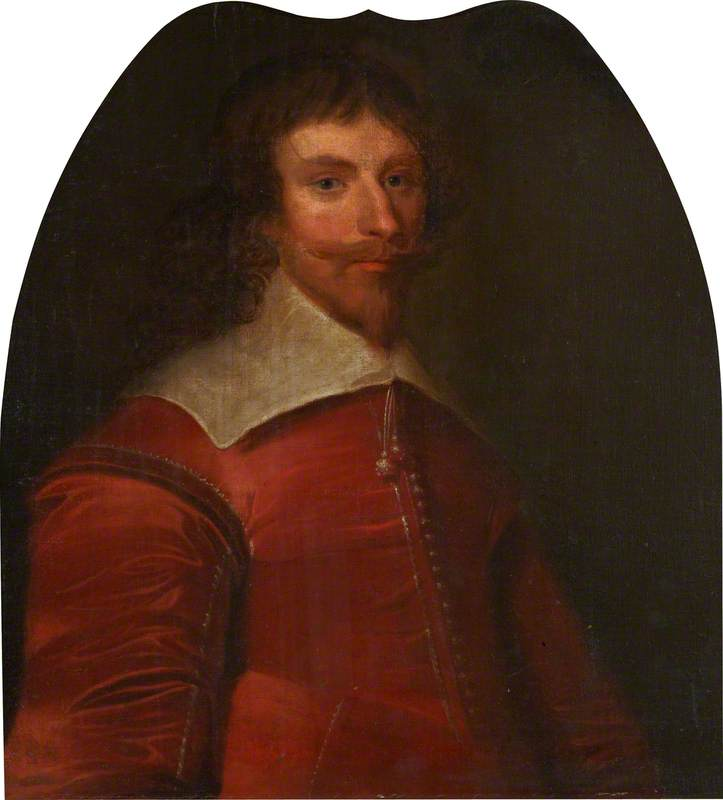
Sir John Campbell of Glenorchy by George Jamesone

== Biography ==
John Campbell of Glenorchy was born at Kilchurn Castle, the son of Sir Robert Campbell, 3rd Baronet of Glenorchy (died 1657) by his wife Isobel Mackintosh, daughter of Lachlan Mor Mackintosh, Chief of the Chattan Confederation. He gained the rank of Colonel in the Perthshire Regiment of Foot and was Commissioner of Supply and Excise for Argyll and Perth. He was Member of Parliament for Argyllshire between 1661 and 1663, otherwise little is known of Campbell.

Campbell married three times. He married firstly, Lady Mary Graham, daughter of William Graham, 7th Earl of Menteith, and with his wife he had fourteen children, including the 1st Earl of Breadalbane. He married secondly, Elizabeth Campbell, daughter of Patrick Campbell of Edinchip, and finally, Christian Muschet.

He died before June 1677.

== See also ==
- Clan Campbell
- Campbell baronets of Glenorchy
- Earl of Breadalbane and Holland
