= Earl of Breadalbane and Holland =

Title in the Peerage of Scotland

Earldom of Breadalbane and Holland
- Arms of the 6th Earl of Breadalbane, 1868 (Lyon Register, vol. 8, p. 13)
- Creation date: 13 August 1681
- Created by: Charles II
- Peerage: Peerage of Scotland
- First holder: John Campbell, 1st Earl of Breadalbane and Holland
- Last holder: John Campbell, 10th Earl of Breadalbane and Holland
- Present holder: Dormant
- Remainder to: Heirs male of the son chosen to succeed him, failing which to the heirs male of his body, failing which to his own heirs male, failing which to his heirs whatsoever
- Subsidiary titles: Lord Glenorchy, Benederaloch, Ormelie and Weick; Viscount of Tay and Paintland
- Former seat: Taymouth Castle

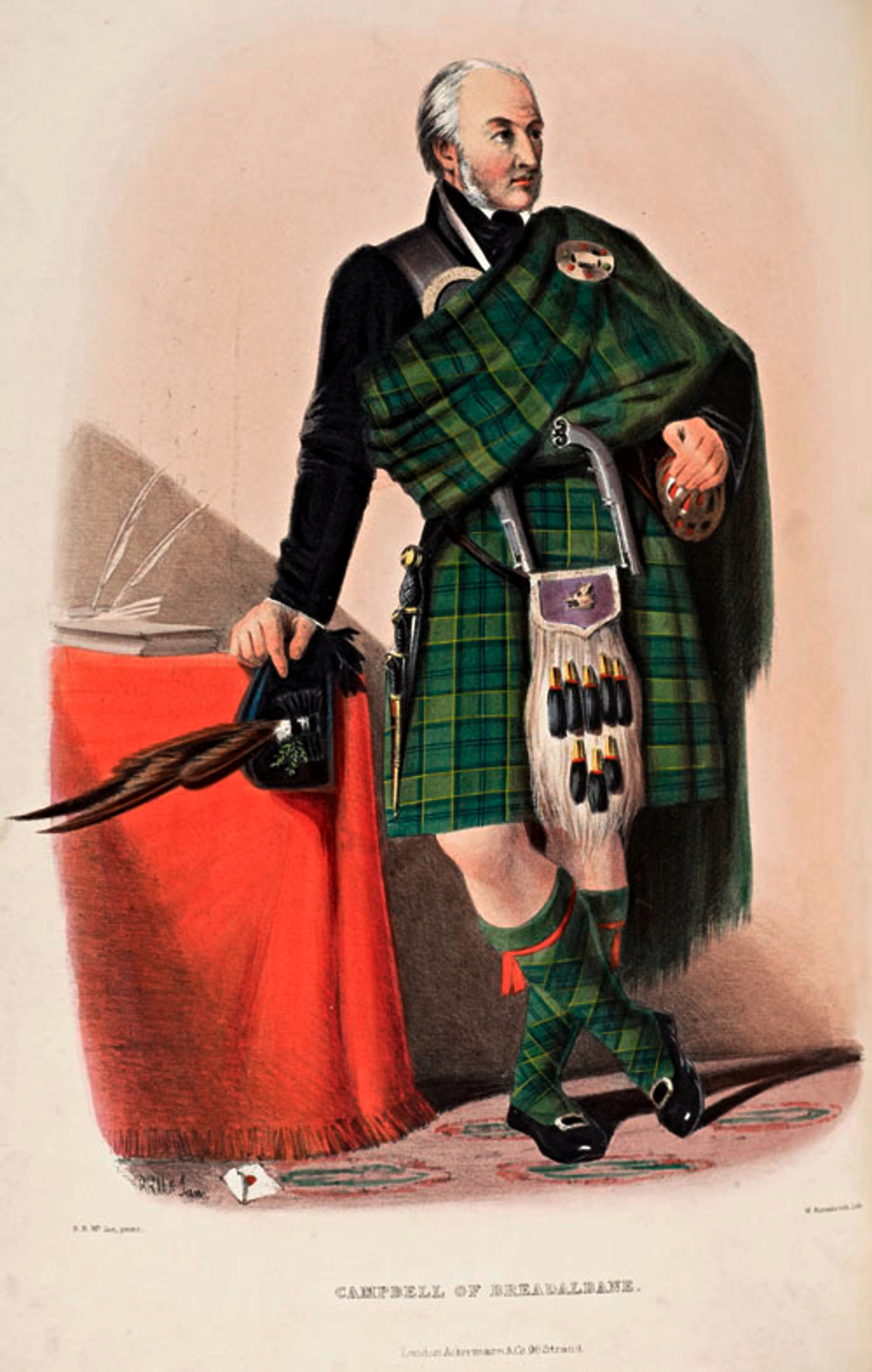
Campbell of Breadalbane

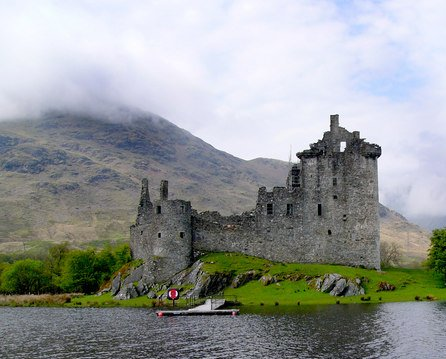
Kilchurn Castle, seat of the Earl of Breadalbane

Earl of Breadalbane and Holland is a title in the Peerage of Scotland. It was created in 1681 for Sir John Campbell, 5th Baronet, of Glenorchy, who had previously been deprived of the title Earl of Caithness. It refers to Breadalbane (/brəˈdɔːlbən/; Scottish Gaelic: Bràghaid Albann, meaning "upper Alba" or "upland of Alba"), a district in Perthshire, comprising a valley within the Grampian Mountains range, archaically spelt Broadalbin.

== Creation ==
Sir John Campbell, as a principal creditor, had acquired the estates of George Sinclair, 6th Earl of Caithness who had died heavily in debt and without issue in 1670. Sir John was consequently created Earl of Caithness in 1673. However after much litigation and even bloodshed at the Battle of Altimarlach, George Sinclair of Keiss (died 1698), the second son of George, 5th Earl of Caithness (died 1643), recovered the estates. Sinclair of Keiss then successfully petitioned parliament regarding the earldom, which was removed from Campbell and finally restored to him in 1681.

Thus deprived by parliament of the Caithness earldom, Sir John Campbell was created Lord Glenorchy, Benederaloch, Ormelie and Weick, Viscount of Tay and Paintland, and Earl of Breadalbane and Holland, with the precedency of the last, on 13 August 1681 as compensation. The titles were created with the power to nominate any of his sons by his first wife to succeed him, failing which to any surviving male son, then to male heirs, failing which to any heirs whatsoever. The "and Holland" part of the title derived from the fact that Campbell was the husband of Lady Mary Rich, daughter of Henry Rich, 1st Earl of Holland (see Earl of Holland). Sir John Campbell then became known as "Breadalbane"

=== The Glenorchy line ===
As a member of a junior branch of Clan Campbell, Breadalbane was a descendant of Sir Colin Campbell, 1st of Glenorchy (died 1475), the son of Duncan Campbell, 1st Lord Campbell by his second wife Margaret Stewart and the half-brother of Archibald Campbell, Master of Campbell, ancestor of the Dukes of Argyll. Colin Campbell was granted Glenorchy and other lands by his father, Duncan, and built Kilchurn Castle on Loch Awe in Argyll. King James III knighted him and granted him land around Loch Tay in thanks for hunting down the local earls who had assassinated James II, and to end the power vacuum in the surrounding region that had resulted when they were executed. The land around Loch Tay formed Breadalbane, creating the association between the area and Sir Colin's descendants.

Sir Colin's son Sir Duncan Campbell of Glenorchy was one of the many Scottish nobles killed at the Battle of Flodden in 1513. Sir Duncan's great-grandson and namesake Duncan Campbell, known as "Black Duncan", represented Argyllshire in the Scottish Parliament. He was knighted in 1590 and created a baronet, of Glenorchy in the County of Perth, in the Baronetage of Nova Scotia in 1625. His elder son, Sir Colin, the second Baronet, died childless and was succeeded by his younger brother, Sir Robert, the third Baronet. He represented Argyllshire in the Scottish Parliament. He was succeeded by his son, Sir John, the fourth Baronet. He also represented Argyllshire in Parliament. He was succeeded by his son by his first marriage, the aforementioned Sir John Campbell, the fifth Baronet, who was created Earl of Breadalbane and Holland in 1681.

== History of the title ==
Lord Breadalbane and Holland's elder son Duncan Campbell, styled Lord Ormelie, was overlooked for the succession (owing to his "incapacity") and died childless in 1727. Breadalbane nominated his younger son John as his successor, as allowed by the patent, and this John consequently succeeded in the titles on his father's death in 1717.

John Campbell, 2nd Earl of Breadalbane and Holland sat in the House of Lords as a Scottish representative peer between 1736 and 1747. He was succeeded by his son, also John, the third Earl.

The third Earl was a prominent statesman, ambassador and a Lord of the Admiralty. He married as his first wife Lady Amabel Grey, daughter of Henry Grey, 1st Duke of Kent. Their daughter Lady Jemima Campbell succeeded her maternal grandfather as Marchioness Grey in 1740. Through Lady Jemima this Lord Breadalbane was a great-grandfather of Prime Minister Lord Goderich. The third Lord Breadalbane outlived both his only son by his first wife and his two sons by his second marriage to Arabella Pershall. On his death in 1782 the male line of the first Earl failed.

The late third Earl was succeeded by his kinsman, the great-grandson of Colin Campbell of Mochaster, younger son of Sir Robert Campbell, 3rd Baronet, and uncle of the first Earl. John Campbell, who became the fourth Earl. He was a Lieutenant-General in the British Army and sat in the House of Lords as a Scottish representative peer between 1784 and 1806. In 1806 he was created Baron Breadalbane, of Taymouth Castle in the County of Perth, in the Peerage of the United Kingdom, which entitled him to an automatic permanent seat in the House of Lords. In 1831 he was further honoured when he was made Earl of Ormelie and Marquess of Breadalbane in the Peerage of the United Kingdom. He was succeeded by his only son, John Campbell, who became the second Marquess.

John Campbell, 2nd Marquess of Breadalbane was a Liberal politician and served twice as Lord Chamberlain of the Household. He was childless and the United Kingdom peerages of Baron Breadalbane, Earl of Ormelie and Marquess of Breadalbane became extinct on his death in 1862. He was succeeded in the Scottish titles by his kinsman, John Campbell, who became the sixth Earl.

The sixth Earl was the grandson of James Campbell, great-great-grandson of William Campbell of Glenfalloch (died 1648) who was in turn the brother of the aforementioned Colin Campbell of Mochaster.

On his death the titles passed to his son, Gavin, the seventh Earl. He was a Liberal politician and notably served as Treasurer of the Household and Lord Steward of the Household. In 1873 he was created Baron Breadalbane, of Kenmure in the County of Perth, in the Peerage of the United Kingdom, which entitled him to an automatic seat in the House of Lords. In 1885 he was made Earl of Ormelie, in the County of Caithness, and Marquess of Breadalbane in the Peerage of the United Kingdom, thus recreating the UK peerage titles held by the third Earl. Gavin Campbell was however childless and these titles consequently again became extinct on his death in 1922. He was succeeded in the Scottish titles by his nephew, Iain Campbell, the eighth Earl.

Iain was the son of Captain the Honourable Ivan Campbell, second son of the sixth Earl. Iain, the eighth Earl, died at an early age in 1923, only a year after succeeding his uncle.

Iain was succeeded by his kinsman, Charles Campbell, the ninth Earl. Charles was the son of Major-General Charles William Campbell of Borland, grandson of John Campbell of Borland, younger brother of the aforementioned James Campbell, grandfather of the sixth Earl. Charles Campbell, 9th Earl of Breadalbane and Holland sat in the House of Lords as a Scottish Representative Peer between 1924 and his death in 1959. He was succeeded by his only son, John, the tenth Earl.

John was severely wounded while serving with the Black Watch in the Second World War and he died childless in 1995 when the titles became dormant.

== Pretenders ==
There are claims that Hungarian-born Huba Campbell (born 1945) petitioned the Lord Lyon for recognition of his right to the Earldom of Breadalbane and Holland, together with the subsidiary titles, and to the undifferenced arms. However, an extensive search in the records of the Lyon Office and discussions with the lawyer involved shows that no such petition was ever made. Genealogist Hugh Peskett failed to find any evidence in Hungary of such a link, and the search was abandoned in 2000. The claim that Huba is the great-great-grandson of George Andrew Campbell (1791–1852)- brother of Charles William Campbell of Borland, who was grandfather of the ninth Earl-cannot be substantiated. The claimed descent was at any rate published in Burke's Peerage in 2003.

A British aristocrat, Sir Lachlan Campbell, 6th Baronet, also claims the titles. He is a descendant of Sir Guy Campbell, 1st Baronet, grandson of John Campbell, son of the Honourable Colin Campbell, the son of first Earl by his second marriage to Lady Mary Campbell. Sir Lachlan, however, is apparently unable to succeed because his ancestor John Campbell was illegitimate (see Campbell baronets of St Cross Mede, for further history of this branch of the family).

== Taymouth Castle ==
The main seat of the Earls of Breadalbane and Holland from the early 19th century was the vast Taymouth Castle in Scotland, which was sold by the seventh Earl shortly after the end of the First World War in 1922.

The father of the Scottish writer Fred Urquhart was chauffeur to the Earl in the early twentieth century, and Urquhart's novel Palace of Green Days (1979) draws on his childhood memories of this.

== Campbell baronets, of Glenorchy (1625) ==
- Sir Duncan Campbell, 1st Baronet (1545–1631)
- Sir Colin Campbell, 2nd Baronet (c. 1577–1640)
- Sir Robert Campbell, 3rd Baronet (c. 1580–c. 1650)
- Sir John Campbell, 4th Baronet (c. 1615–c. 1670)
- Sir John Campbell, 5th Baronet (1635–1717) (created Earl of Breadalbane and Holland in 1681)

== Earls of Breadalbane and Holland (1681) ==
- John Campbell, 1st Earl of Breadalbane and Holland (1635–1717)
  - Duncan Campbell, Lord Ormelie (c. 1660 – 1727)
- John Campbell, 2nd Earl of Breadalbane and Holland (1662–1752)
- John Campbell, 3rd Earl of Breadalbane and Holland (1692–1782)
  - Hon. Henry Campbell (c. 1721 – 1727)
  - Hon. George Campbell (died 1744)
  - John Campbell, Lord Glenorchy (1738–1771)
- John Campbell, 4th Earl of Breadalbane and Holland (1762–1834) (created Marquess of Breadalbane in 1831)

== Marquesses of Breadalbane; First creation (1831) ==
Marquessate of Breadalbane Extinct
- Creation: 1831 (first creation); 1885 (second creation)
- Created by: William IV (first creation); Victoria (second creation)
- Peerage: Peerage of the United Kingdom
- First holder: John Campbell, 1st Marquess of Breadalbane
- Last holder: Gavin Campbell, 1st Marquess of Breadalbane
- Subsidiary titles: Earl of Ormelie
- Extinction date: 1862 (first creation); 1922 (second creation)
- Former seat: Taymouth Castle

Other title: Earl of Ormelie

- John Campbell, 1st Marquess of Breadalbane (1762–1834)
- John Campbell, 2nd Marquess of Breadalbane (1796–1862)

== Earls of Breadalbane and Holland (1681; Reverted) ==
- John Alexander Gavin Campbell, 6th Earl of Breadalbane and Holland (1824–1871)
- Gavin Campbell, 7th Earl of Breadalbane and Holland (1851–1922) (created Marquess of Breadalbane in 1885)

== Marquesses of Breadalbane; Second creation (1885) ==
Other titles: Earl of Ormelie (1885), Baron Breadalbane of Kenmure (1873)

- Gavin Campbell, 1st Marquess of Breadalbane (1851–1922)

== Earls of Breadalbane and Holland (1681; Reverted) ==
- Iain Edward Herbert Campbell, 8th Earl of Breadalbane and Holland (1885–1923)
- Charles William Campbell, 9th Earl of Breadalbane and Holland (1889–1959)
- John Romer Boreland Campbell, 10th Earl of Breadalbane and Holland (1919–1995)

== Family tree ==
Family tree of the Marquess of Breadalbane and Earl of Breadalbane and Holland

Colin Campbell of Glenorchy; 1499–1583
Campbell baronets, of Glenorchy, 1625
Duncan Campbell of Glenorchy; 1545–1631; 1st Campbell Baronet of Glenorchy
Coli Campbell c. 1577–1640; 2nd Campbell Baronet of Glenorchy	Robert Campbell c. 1580–c. 1650; 3rd Campbell Baronet of Glenorchy
John Campbell c. 1615–c. 1670; 4th Campbell Baronet of Glenorchy	Colin Campbell of Mochaster; 1616–1668	William Campbell d. 1648
Earl of Breadalbane and Holland, Viscount of Tay and Paintland, Lord Glenorchy, Benederaloch, Ormelie and Weick, 1681
John Campbell; 1636–1717; 1st Earl of Breadalbane and Holland, etc., 5th Campbell Baronet of Glenorchy, Earl of Caithness	Robert Campbell b. 1647
John Campbell; 1662–1752; 2nd Earl of Breadalbane and Holland, etc., 6th Campbell Baronet of Glenorchy	Robert Campbell; 1660–1705	Colin Campbell; 1680–1737
John Campbell; 1696–1782; 3rd Earl of Breadalbane and Holland, etc., 7th Campbell Baronet of Glenorchy	Colin Campbell of Carwhin; 1704–1772	William Campbell; 1715–1791
Baron Breadalbane of Taymouth Castle, 1806; Marquess of Breadalbane (1st creation), Earl of Ormelie (1st creation), 1831
John Campbell; 1738–1771 styled Lord Glenorchy; Decessit sine prole	John Campbell; 1762–1834; 1st Marquess of Breadalbane, etc., 4th Earl of Breadalbane and Holland, etc., 8th Campbell Baronet of Glenorchy	James Campbell; 1754–1806	John Campbell; 1763–1823
John Campbell; 1824–1862; 2nd Marquess of Breadalbane, etc., 5th Earl of Breadalbane and Holland, etc., 9th Campbell Baronet of Glenorchy	William Campbell; 1788–1850	Charles William Campbell; 1789–1861	George Andrew Campbell; 1791–1852
Marquessate of Breadalbane (1st creation), Earldom of Ormelie (1st creation) extinct, 1834
John Alexander Campbell; 1796–1862; 6th Earl of Breadalbane and Holland, etc., 10th Campbell Baronet of Glenorchy	Charles William Campbell; 1836–1894	John Breadalbane Campbell; 1839–1918
Baron Breadalbane of Kenmure, 1873; Marquess of Breadalbane (2nd creation), Earl of Ormelie (2nd creation), 1885
Gavin Campbell; 1851–1922; Marquess of Breadalbane, etc., 7th Earl of Breadalbane and Holland, etc., 11th Campbell Baronet of Glenorchy	Ivan Campbell; 1859–1917	Andrew John Breadalbane Campbell; 1874–1899
Marquessate of Breadalbane (2nd creation), Earldom of Ormelie (2nd creation) extinct, 1922
Iain Edward Herbert Campbell; 1885–1923; 8th Earl of Breadalbane and Holland, etc., 12th Campbell Baronet of Glenorchy	Charles William Campbell; 1889–1959; 9th Earl of Breadalbane and Holland, etc., 13th Campbell Baronet of Glenorchy	Janos Breadalbane Campbell b. 1895
John Romer Boreland Campbell; 1919–1995; 10th Earl of Breadalbane and Holland, etc., 14th Campbell Baronet of Glenorchy	Huba Campbell b. 1945
All titles dormant, 1995	Petitioned for rights

== See also ==
- Earl of Caithness
- Earl of Holland
- Duke of Argyll
- Clan Campbell
- Carter-Campbell of Possil
- Campbell baronets of Glenorchy
