= Charles Campbell, 9th Earl of Breadalbane and Holland =

Scottish peer and soldier (1889-1959)

The Earl of Breadalbane and Holland in 1923.

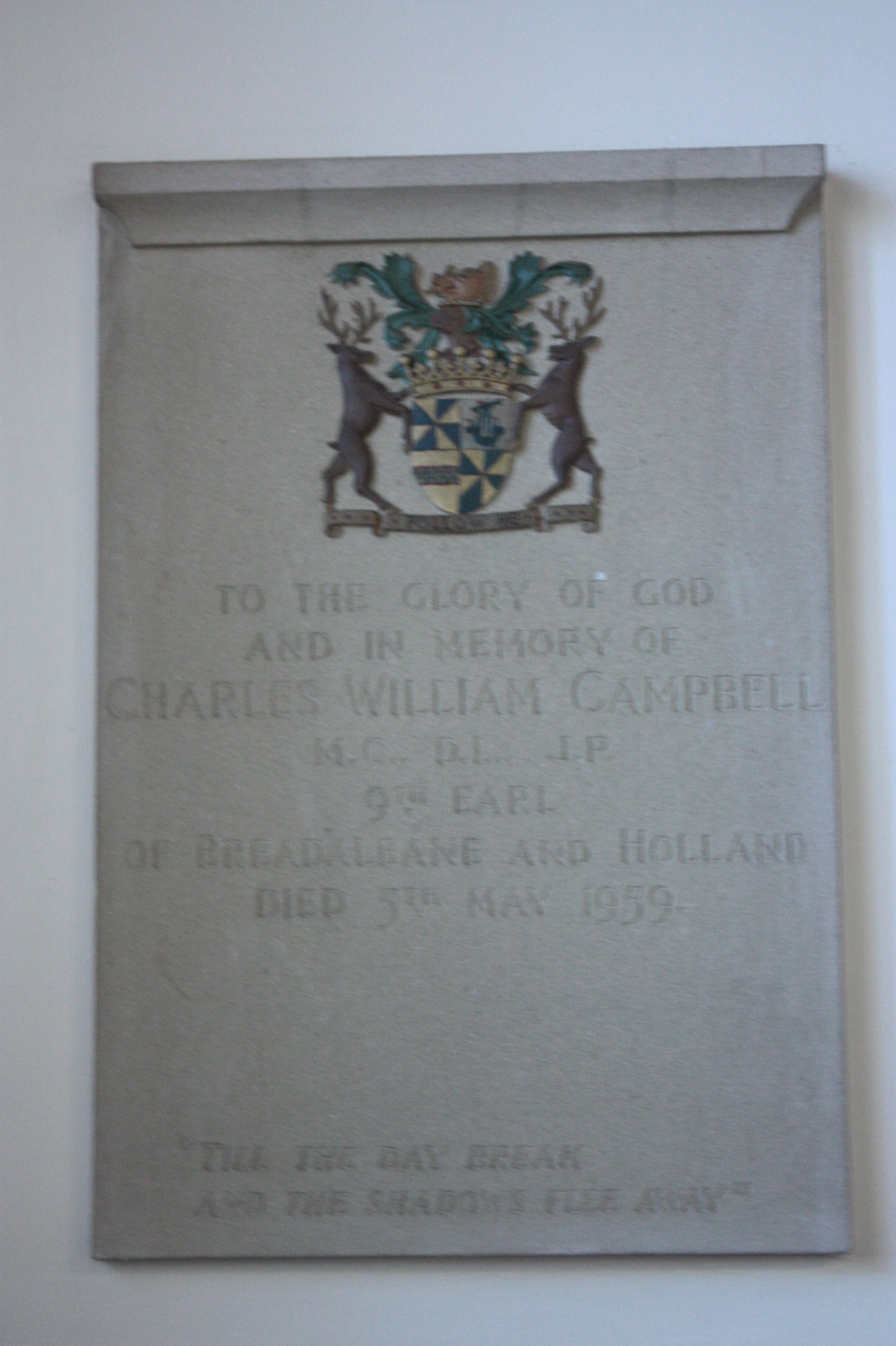
Memorial to Charles William Campbell, Dirleton Kirk, East Lothian

Lieutenant-Colonel Charles William Campbell, 9th Earl of Breadalbane and Holland MC DL JP (11 June 1889 – 5 May 1959), known as Charles Campbell until 1923, was a Scottish peer and soldier.

Campbell was the son of Major-General Charles William Campbell by Gwynedd, daughter of William Edward Brinckman and granddaughter of Sir Theodore Brinckman, 1st Baronet. He was a Major in the Royal Horse Artillery and Royal Field Artillery and a Lieutenant-Colonel in the Argyll and Sutherland Highlanders, and fought in the First World War, where he was awarded the Military Cross.

In May 1923, aged 34, he succeeded in the earldom of Breadalbane and Holland on the early death of his third cousin once removed, the eighth Earl. This was a Scottish peerage and did not entitle him to an automatic seat in the House of Lords. However, in 1924 he was elected as one of the sixteen Scottish representative peer to sit in the House of Lords. With the titles he inherited family estates and Taymouth Castle, but sold the castle, which was expensive to maintain. Lord Breadalbane later became a Deputy Lieutenant for Perthshire and a Justice of the Peace for Argyll and Perthshire and a member of the Honourable Corps of Gentlemen-at-Arms and of the Royal Company of Archers.

Lord Breadalbane and Holland married Armorer Romer, daughter of Romer Williams, DL, JP, of Newnham Hall, Daventry, Northamptonshire, and widow of Eric Nicholson, in 1918. He died in May 1959, aged 69, and was succeeded in the earldom by his son, John. The Countess of Breadalbane and Holland died in 1987.

Peerage of Scotland
Preceded by Iain Edward Herbert Campbell	Earl of Breadalbane and Holland; 1923–1959	Succeeded by John Romer Boreland Campbell
