= Kilchurn Castle =

Historic structure in Argyll and Bute, Scotland

- Argyll and Bute in Scotland
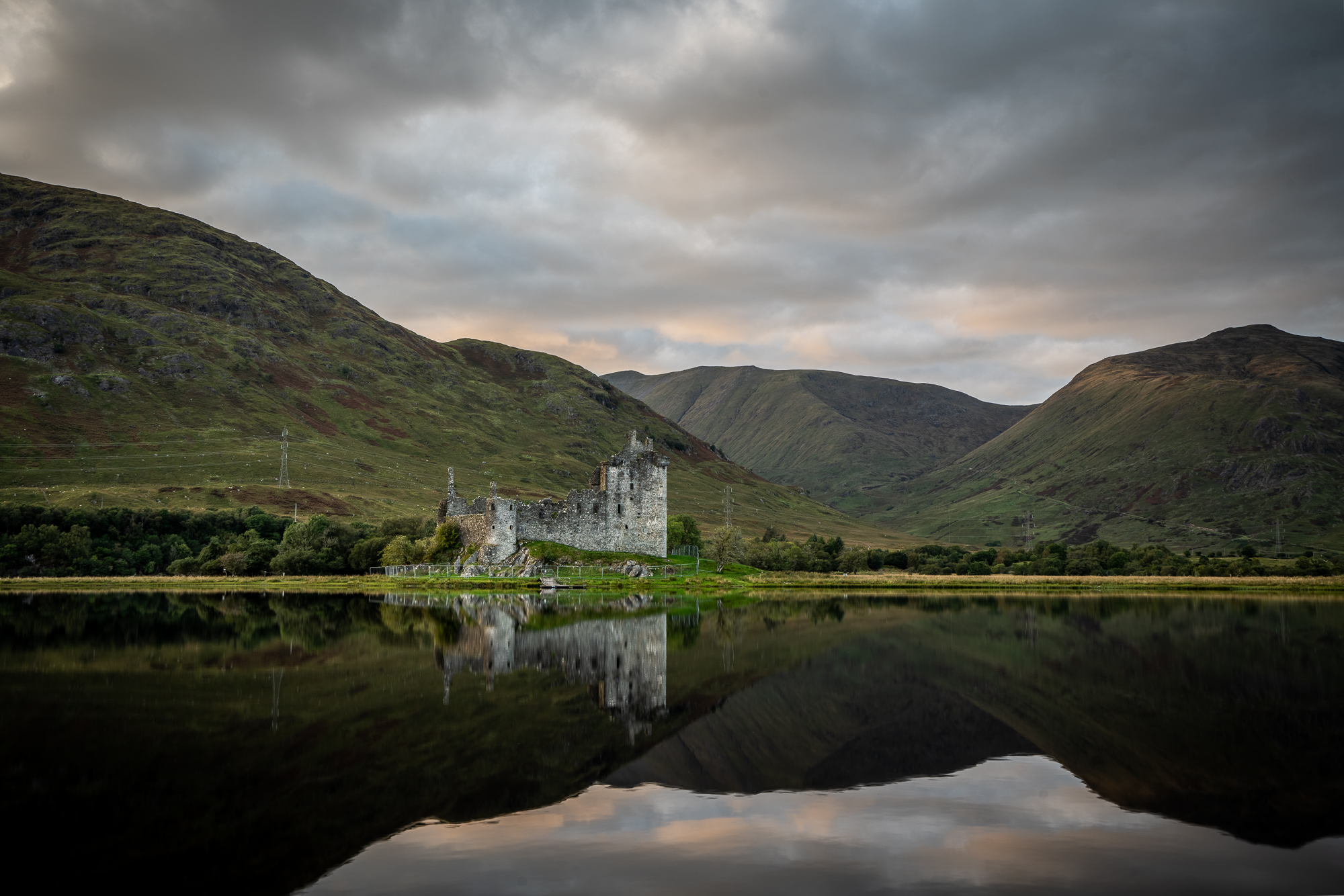
- Kilchurn Castle in 2023

Site information
- Type: Castle
- Owner: Historic Environment Scotland
- Open to the public: Yes
- Condition: Ruined
- Website: Historic Scotland

Location
- Location in Argyll and Bute
- Coordinates: 56°24′13″N 5°1′44″W

Site history
- Built: 15th century
- Built by: Clan Campbell
- In use: 15th century-1760
- Fate: Renovated frequently, destroyed by lightning

Kilchurn Castle (/kəlˈxʊərn/) is a ruined structure on a rocky peninsula at the northeastern end of Loch Awe, in Argyll and Bute, Scotland. It was first constructed in the mid-15th century as the base of the Campbells of Glenorchy, who extended both the castle and their territory in the area over the next 150 years. After the Campbells became Earls of Breadalbane and moved to Taymouth Castle, Kilchurn fell out of use and was in ruins by 1770. It is now in the care of Historic Environment Scotland and is open to the public in summer.

== History ==
The Campbells of Glenorchy were the most powerful cadet branch of the Clan Campbell, and over two centuries from the 1430s came to dominate the central Highlands. Kilchurn Castle, originally belonging to Clan Gregor, was lost to Colin Campbell around 1440. The building of several castles, of which the newer Kilchurn was the first, was a key part of their territorial expansion during this period. Sir Colin Campbell, 1st of Glenorchy (died 1475), was a younger son of Duncan Campbell, 1st Lord Campbell, ancestor of the Earls of Argyll. Sir Colin was granted Glen Orchy and other lands by his father in 1432, and afterwards established Kilchurn around 1450. The first castle comprised the five-storey tower house, with a courtyard defended by an outer wall. At the time Kilchurn was on a small island scarcely larger than the castle itself, and would have been accessed via an underwater or low-lying causeway.

Sir Colin's son, Sir Duncan Campbell of Glenorchy, built the 'laich hall' - a single-storey dining hall built along the inside of the south curtain. Sir Duncan was one of the many Scottish nobles killed at the Battle of Flodden in 1513. During the second half of the 16th century, another Sir Colin Campbell, the 6th Laird (1499–1583), further improved the castle's accommodation by adding some chambers to the north of the tower house, and remodelling the parapet. This included the introduction of the circular corner turrets adorned by corbels. Sir Colin also constructed Balloch Castle (now Taymouth Castle) by Loch Tay, to consolidate the Campbell's territorial gains in Perthshire, which had been achieved largely at the expense of their former allies, the Clan MacGregor of Glenstrae.

Sir Duncan Campbell, 1st Baronet, (c.1550–1631), known as "Black Duncan", represented Argyll in the Scottish Parliament and was created a baronet, of Glenorchy in the County of Perth, in the Baronetage of Nova Scotia in 1625. Sir Duncan had the south range of the castle rebuilt and enlarged in 1614, and constructed a new range incorporating a chapel in the south-east part of the courtyard. The ambitious Black Duncan also began construction of Finlarig Castle at the west end of Loch Tay, and improved farmland around Finlarig, Kilchurn and Balloch Castles. In 1629, Sir Ewen Cameron of Lochiel was born at the Castle. His mother, Margaret Campbell, was a daughter of the 3rd Baronet, and had married a Cameron of Lochiel.

In 1681, Sir John Campbell, 5th Baronet, was created Earl of Breadalbane and Holland. He took advantage of the turbulence of the times, negotiating with Jacobite rebels at the same time as serving William III. In 1693, he promoted a scheme to pacify the Highlands, and as part of this he began conversion of Kilchurn into a modern barracks, capable of housing 200 troops. His main addition was the three-storey L-shaped block along the north side. In 1714, on the death of Queen Anne, Breadalbane held a conference of Jacobites at Kilchurn, and he subsequently joined the Earl of Mar's Jacobite rising of 1715. Following the failure of the rising, he returned home to find pro-government members of his household had turned Kinchurn and Finlarig over to Alexander Campbell of Fonab, to whom Breadalbane was obliged to surrender in February 1716. He remained under house arrest at Taymouth until his death the next year. Kilchurn was also used as a government garrison during the 1745 Jacobite rising. The Campbells attempted, unsuccessfully, to sell Kilchurn to the government after they moved in 1740 to the reconstructed Taymouth Castle.

In 1760, the castle was badly damaged by lightning and was completely abandoned; the remains of a turret of a tower, still resting upside-down in the centre of the courtyard, attest to the violence of the storm. The castle was unroofed by 1770. J. M. W. Turner painted the castle on one of his tours of Scotland in the early 19th century. In 1817, the water level in Loch Awe was altered, so that the castle now stands on a long peninsula. MacGibbon and Ross surveyed the castle in about 1887, after which restoration works appear to have altered some of the castle's original features.

The ruin is now in the care of Historic Environment Scotland, and is open to the public during the summer. Access is either by boat from Lochawe pier, or on foot from the A85 near Dalmally. The access is under the railway viaduct that crosses Loch Awe, and access is sometimes restricted by higher-than-usual levels of water in the loch, which turn the site into a temporary island. The castle is a scheduled monument.

The castle is currently closed for conservation works. Signage on the security fencing surrounding the castle states the closure is due to danger from falling masonry. There is no indicated time scale for reopening. Visitors can, however, walk around the castle. Entrance to the pier is also closed.

== Gallery ==
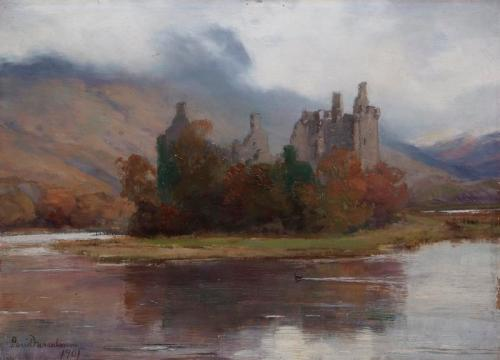
Kilchurn Castle by David Farquharson, 1901

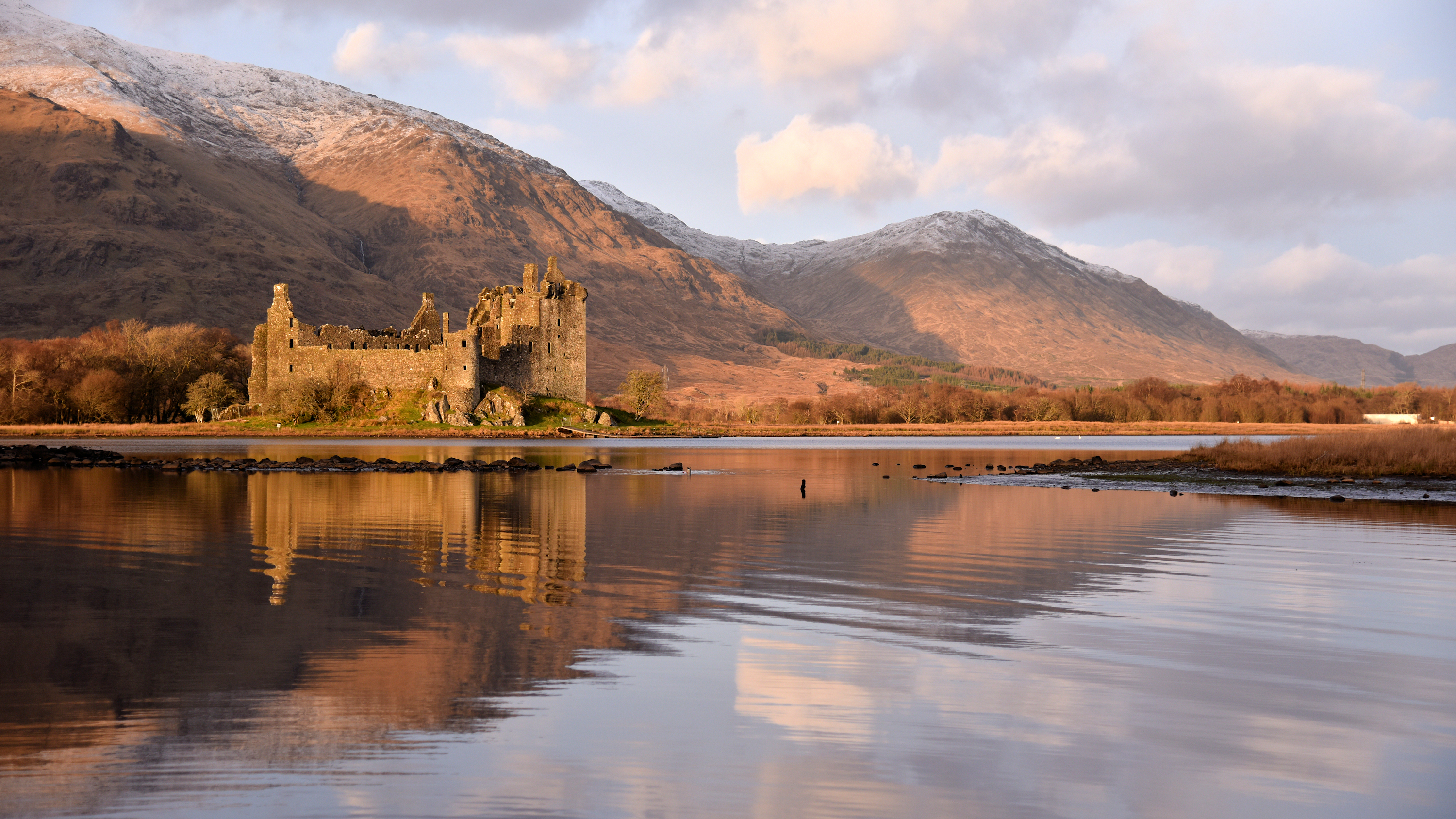
Kilchurn Castle reflecting on Loch Awe

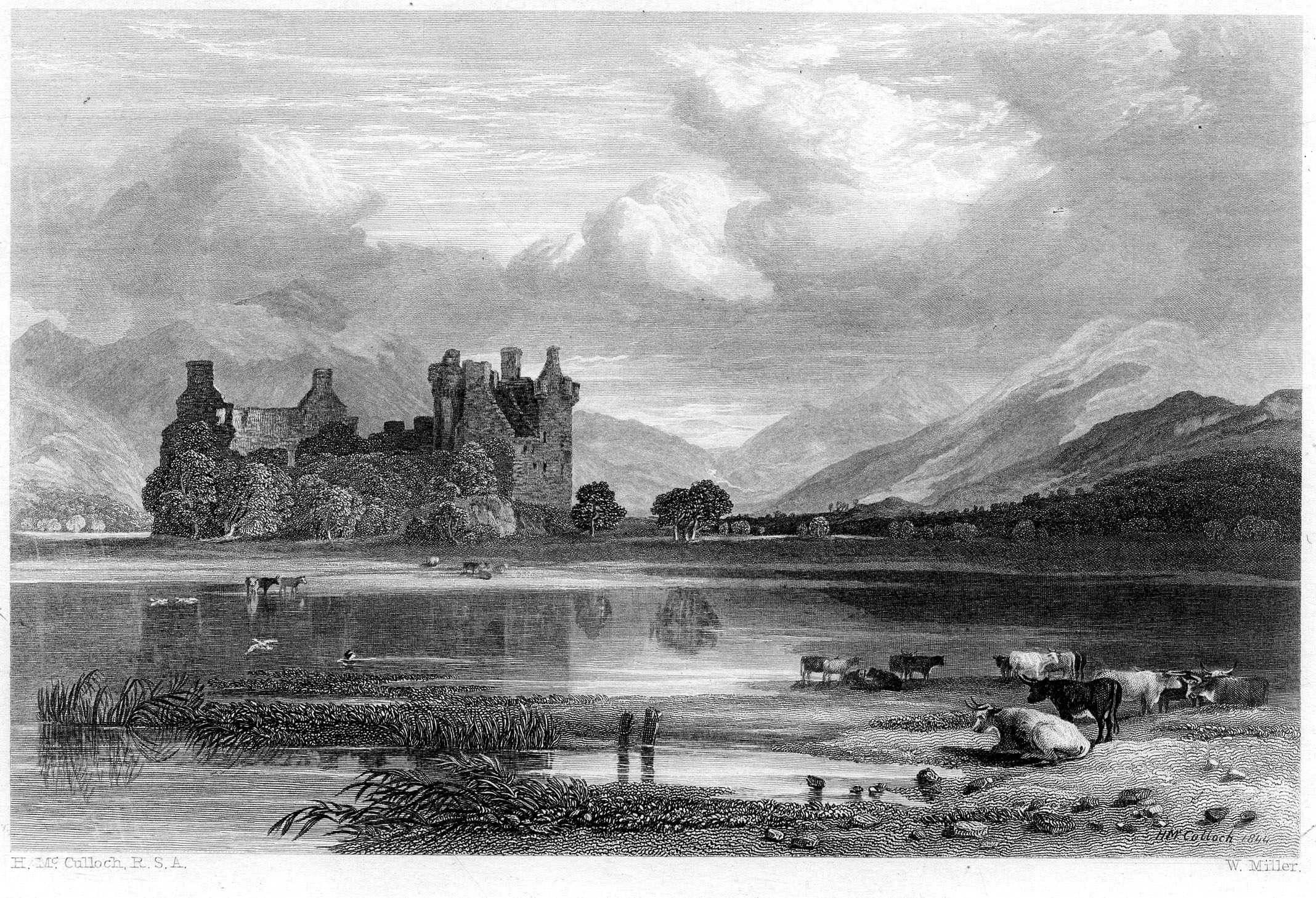
Engraving of Kilchurn Castle by William Miller, 1846

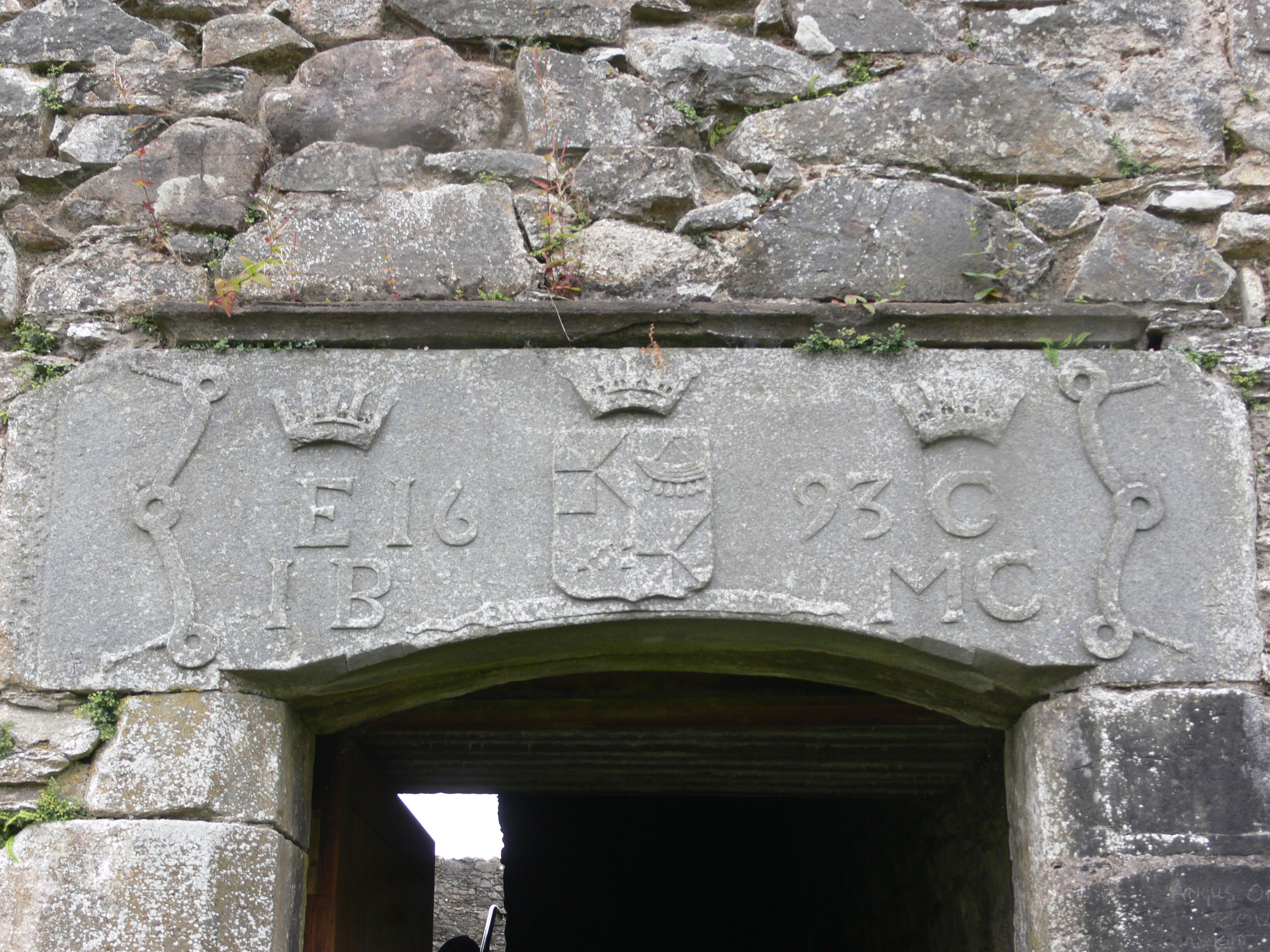
Portal with a coat of arms

Coat of Arms Earl of Breadalbane

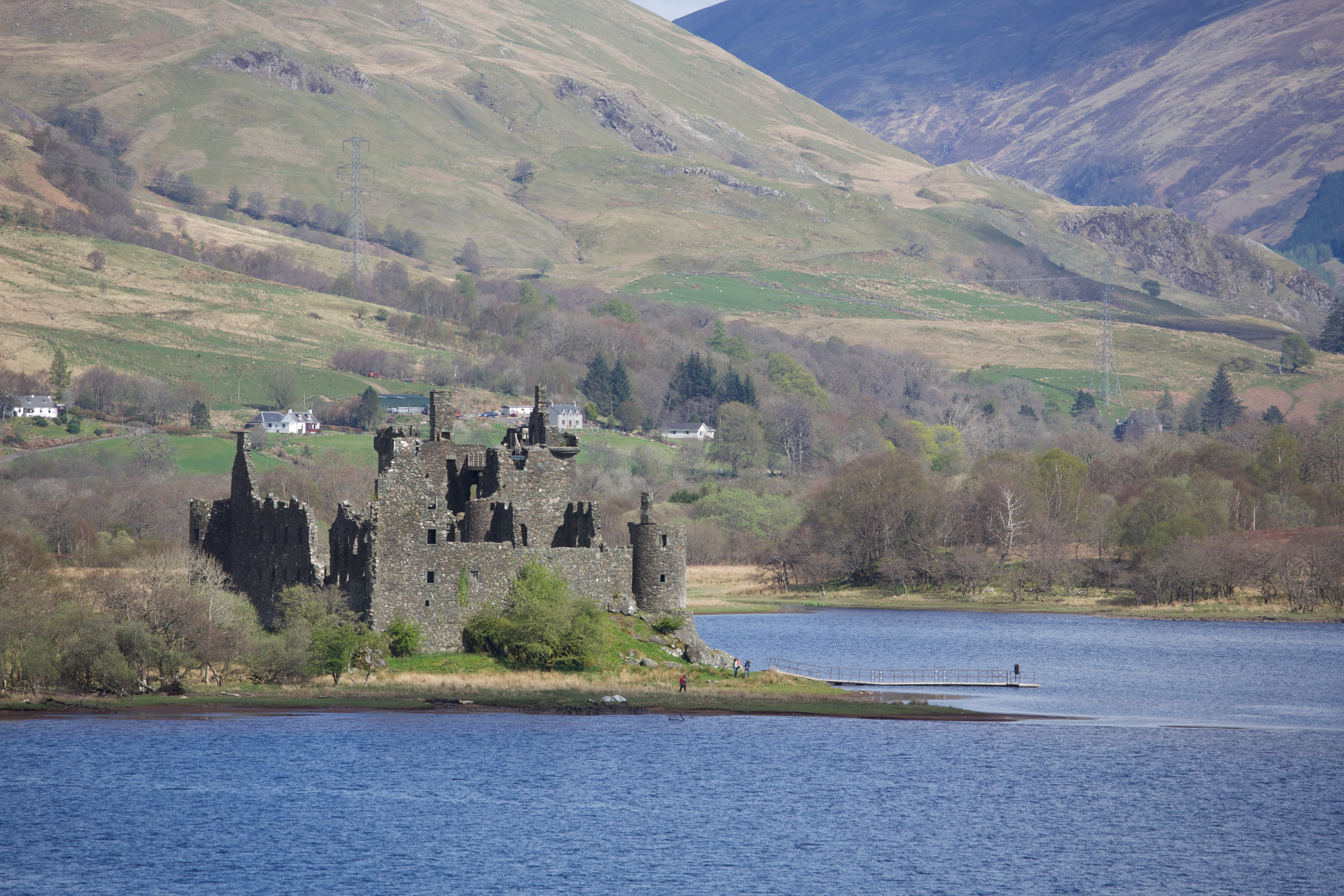
Kilchurn Castle, viewed from Loch Awe Hotel to the west

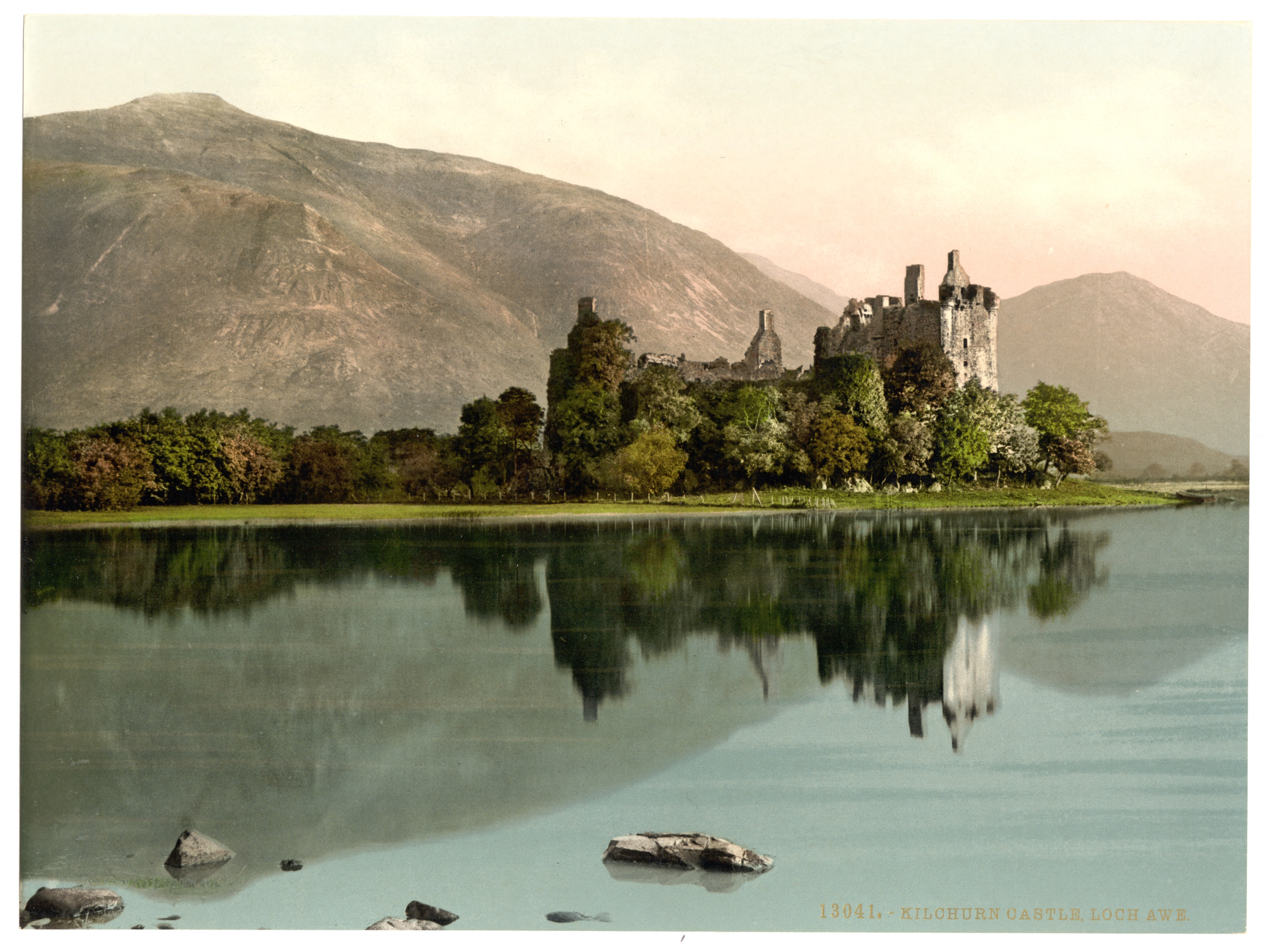
Late 19th-century postcard view

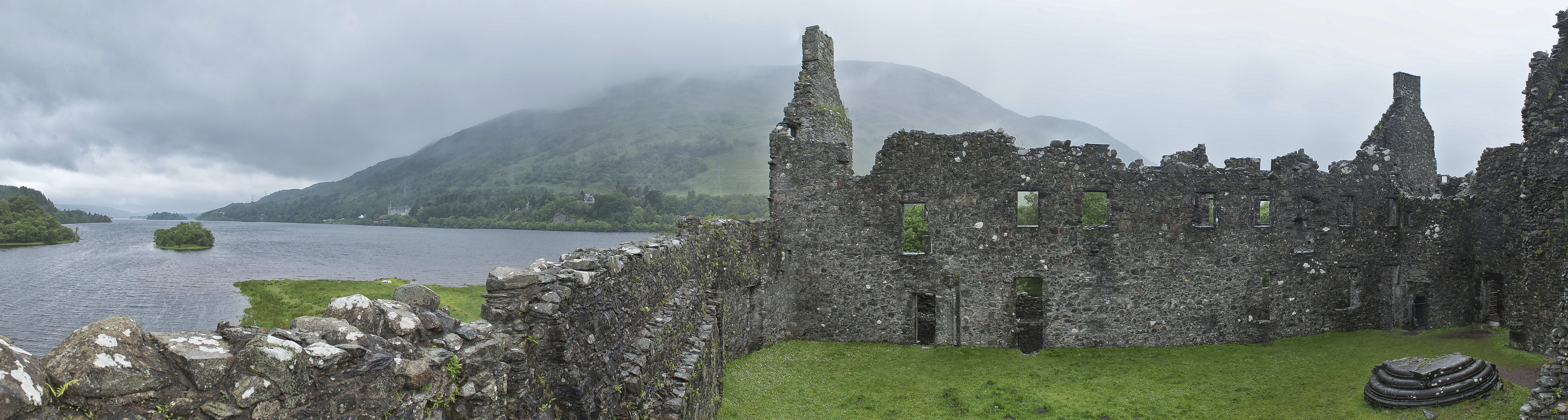
Courtyard

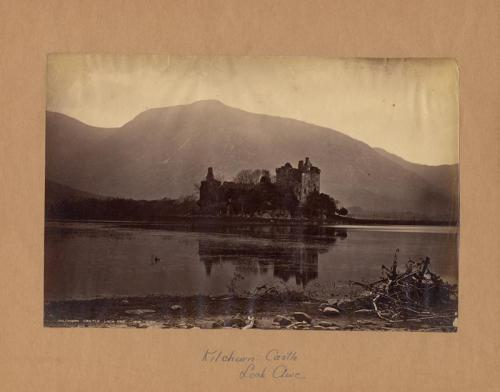
Kilchurn Castle Loch Awe - Photographic print

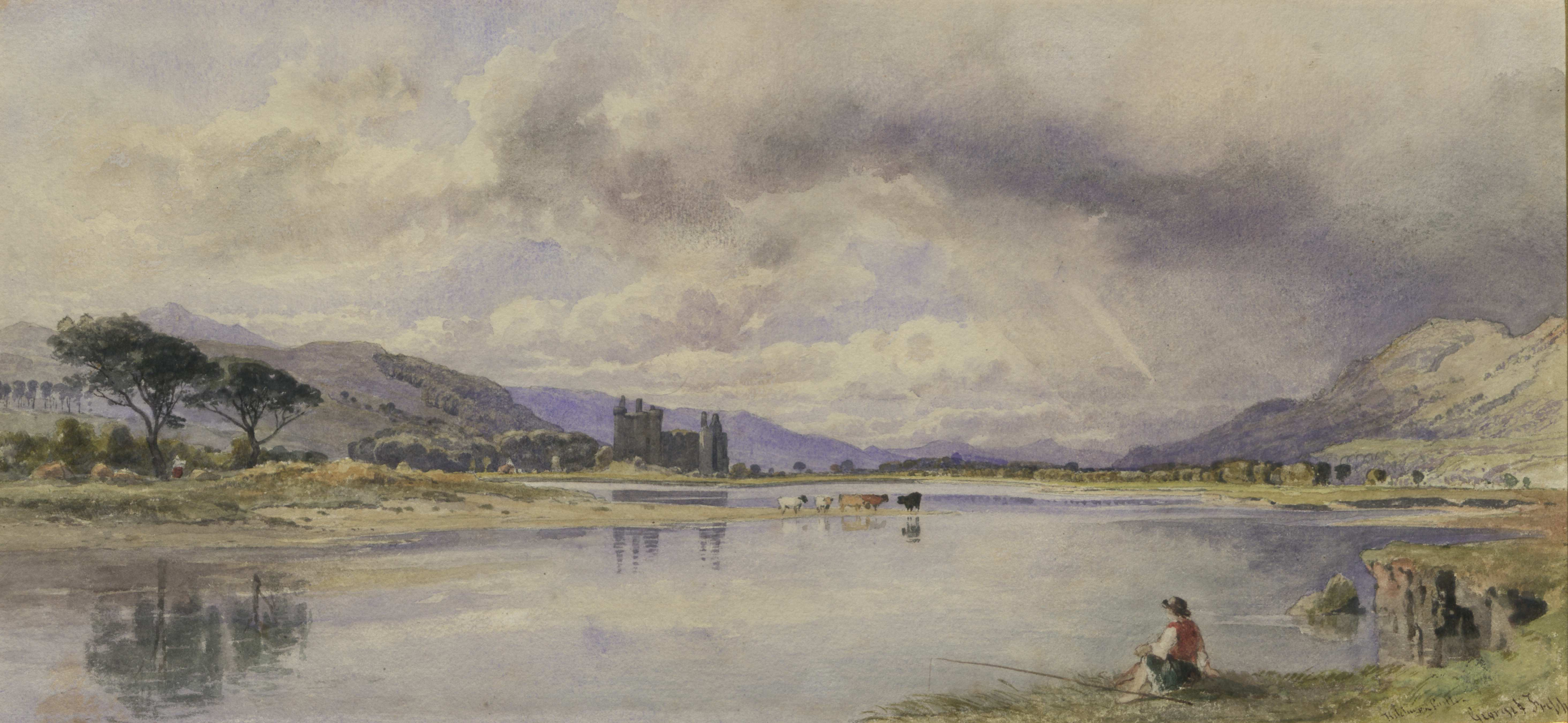
Kilchurn Castle - Loch Awe by George Arthur Fripp, Aberdeen Archives, Gallery & Museums Collection
