= Sir Robert Campbell, 3rd Baronet =

Scottish nobleman and landowner (c.1575-1657)

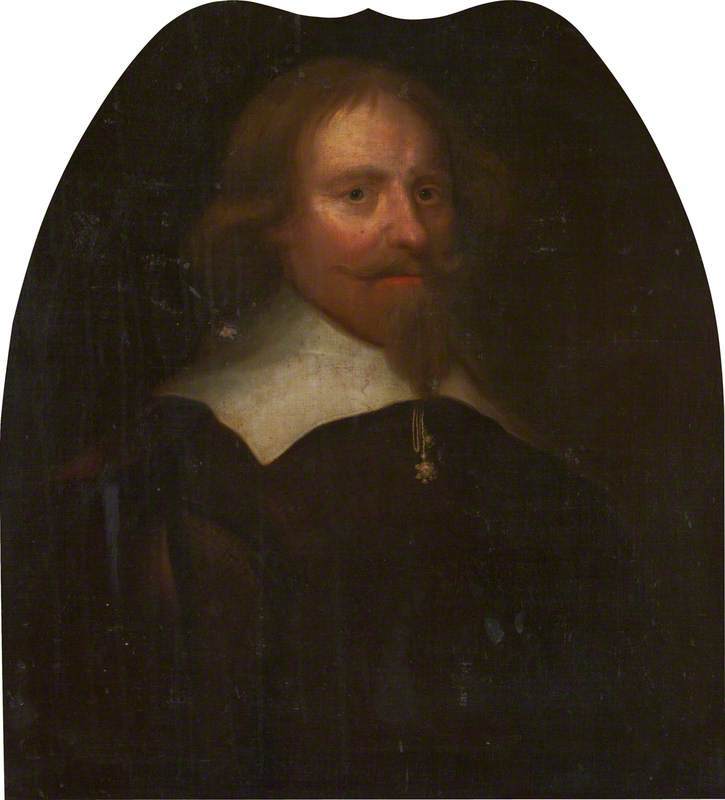
Sir Robert Campbell of Glenorchy by George Jamesone

Sir Robert Campbell, 3rd Baronet of Glenorchy (c.1575 – 17 November 1657) was a Scottish nobleman and landowner, the 9th Laird of Glenorchy and Glenfalloch.

== Biography ==
Arms of Campbell of Glenorchy

Sir Robert Campbell was the second son of Sir Duncan Campbell, 1st Baronet, a powerful Campbell chieftain and courtier known as Duncan Dubh ('Black Duncan'), and his wife Jane Stewart, daughter of the 4th Earl of Atholl. Seated at Kilchurn Castle, Loch Awe, his brother Colin Campbell, 2nd Baronet died in 1640 without a male heir and so his title and estates were passed on to Robert, who had married Isobel Mackintosh, daughter of Lachlan Mor Mackintosh, 16th of Mackintosh. Sir Robert was a Member of Parliament for Argyll between 1639 and 1649, and was "brought into the very centre of the military, political and ecclesiastical movements of that stormy period". During the Wars of the Three Kingdoms, he was a Covenanter who fought under his kinsman the Marquess of Argyll, thus taking part in the destruction of the Marquess of Montrose.

He had eight sons and nine daughters, and was succeeded in the Campbell baronetage of Glenorchy by his eldest son John, who was himself the father of Sir John Campbell, 5th Baronet (later 1st Earl of Breadalbane and Holland). Sir Robert died in 1657 at the age of eighty-two. The family came to be one of the most feared and powerful Highland clans.
