= Sir Colin Campbell, 2nd Baronet =

Scottish nobleman and patron of the arts (c.1577–1640)

Sir Colin Campbell, 2nd Baronet of Glenorchy (c.1577–1640) was a Scottish nobleman, 8th Laird of Glenorchy, known as a patron of the arts.

Arms of Clan Campbell of Glenorchy

== Biography ==
He was the son of Duncan Campbell of Glenorchy and Lady Jane Stewart, a daughter of John Stewart, 4th Earl of Atholl and Margaret Fleming. Duncan was the 7th Laird of Glenorchy, and his shrewd, ruthless dealings as "Black Duncan" had capped a spectacular rise in the family fortunes to national prominence in Scotland. He was knighted at the coronation of Anne of Denmark on 17 May 1590, and later acquired a Nova Scotia baronetcy.

Colin Campbell was a man of general culture, and devoted much effort rebuilding and decorating Balloch Castle. He employed a German artist and George Jamesone to paint a series of portraits for it. The German artist painted male ancestors, and Jamesone made a series of Ladies of Glenorchy, eight portraits of wives of lairds. He also improved Barcaldine Castle.

He married Juliana Campbell, daughter of Hugh Campbell of Loudoun and Margaret Gordon. Childless, they fostered Archibald Campbell (later 9th Earl of Argyll). This fostering repeated in the next generation that of Archibald's father Archibald Campbell, 1st Marquess of Argyll, who became Clan Campbell's head, and had been happily fostered (a custom of the period, but also with political ramifications within the clan) by Duncan Campbell.

His titles and estate passed on his death to his brother Robert.

== Notes ==
Baronetage of Nova Scotia
| Preceded by Duncan Campbell | Baronet (of Glenorchy); 1631–1640 | Succeeded by Robert Campbell |
