= Finlarig Castle =

Castle in Stirling, Scotland

Coordinates: 56.4747°N 4.3093°W

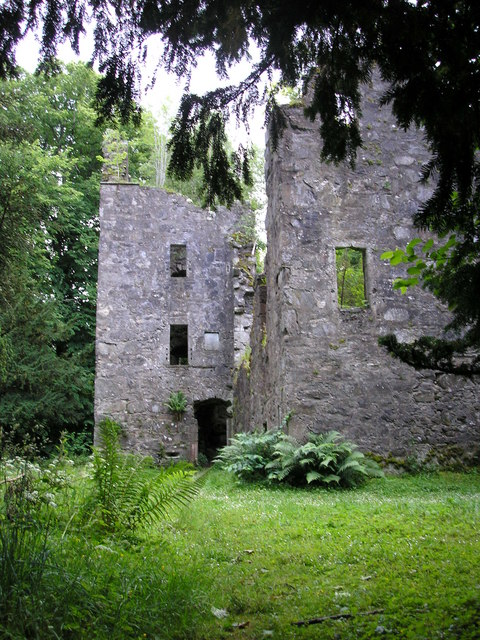
The ruins of Finlarig Castle

Finlarig Castle is an early 17th-century castle standing on a mound on a peninsula between the River Lochay and Loch Tay, just over 1/2 mile (0.80 km) north of Killin in Stirling (formerly in Perthshire), Scotland.

Built in 1629 by 'Black' Duncan Campbell (Donnchadh Dubh) of Glenorchy, the castle is an L-plan tower-house, formerly protected by an outer enclosure or barmekin, which is now in a dangerously ruinous condition. It was one of many strongholds built in Argyll and Perthshire by the Campbells of Breadalbane. The castle was visited by Rob Roy MacGregor in 1713.

Near the Castle's north wall is a stone-lined pit which, legend has it, was used for beheading prisoners of noble blood. Commoners were hanged on a nearby oak tree. Near the Castle are the remnants of the Breadalbane Mausoleum, a mock-Tudor chapel erected in 1829 on the site of an earlier chapel and burial place founded in 1523 by an ancestor of the Earls of Breadalbane, Sir Colin Campbell. Allowed to decay over many years, this brick-built building has almost completely collapsed.
