= John Campbell, 1st Earl of Breadalbane and Holland =

Scottish politician (1636–1717)

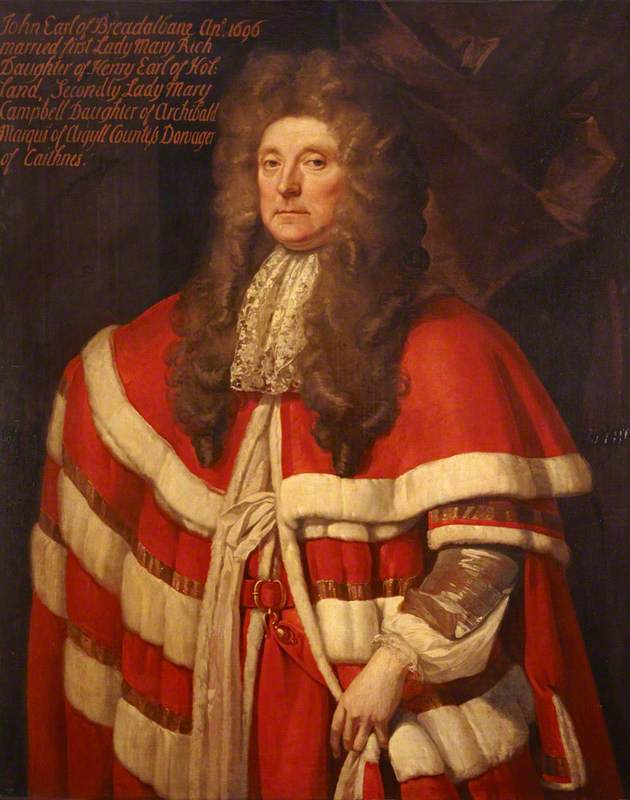
John Campbell, 1st Earl of Breadalbane

John Campbell, 1st Earl of Breadalbane and Holland (1636 – 19 March 1717), known as Sir John Campbell, 5th Baronet from 1670 to 1681, was a Scottish politician. Heavily involved in the Glorious Revolution and Jacobite risings, he was known as "Slippery John". An astute political man, Campbell was one of the men implicated in the Massacre of Glencoe, although later exonerated of all charges[5].

== Biography ==
Arms of Campbell, Earl of Breadalbane

He was the eldest son of Sir John Campbell of Glenorchy and the Lady Mary Graham, daughter of William Graham, 1st Earl of Airth and 7th Earl of Menteith. He took part in the abortive royalist uprising under Glencairn in 1654, and was one of those who urged Monck to declare a free parliament in England to facilitate the restoration. He sat in the Scottish parliament as member for Argyllshire from 1669 to 1674.

In October 1672, as principal creditor to George Sinclair, 6th Earl of Caithness, he obtained the inheritance of his lands and properties. After the 6th Earl's death without heirs; he became Earl of Caithness and Viscount of Breadalbane. In 1678 he married the former Earl's widow, Mary Campbell, the Countess of Caithness, an economical step which saved him his obligation to pay her 12,000 marks a year. In 1680 he invaded Caithness with a band of 800 men and defeated and dispossessed the contingent of the Sinclairs at the Battle of Altimarlach. The natural heir, a younger son of the fifth earl however, was subsequently confirmed in his lands and titles by the Parliament of Scotland, so on 13 August 1681, Campbell obtained a new patent which made him Earl of Breadalbane and Holland, Viscount of Tay and Paintland, and Lord Glenorchy, Benederloch, Ormelie and Wick, in the Peerage of Scotland, with special power to nominate his successor from among the sons of his first wife. In 1685 he became a member of the Scottish privy council. Though nominally a Presbyterian he had assisted the intolerant and despotic government of the Duke of Lauderdale in 1678 with 1700 men.

His nephew was the Duke of Argyll, a relationship that irked him and led to his continuous political maneuverings to improve his lot. It was important that William III obtained his services in conciliating the Highlanders. Breadalbane at first carried on communications with Dundee and was implicated in the Jacobite intrigue called the Montgomery plot, but after the battle of Killiecrankie in July 1689 he made overtures to the government, subsequently took the oath of allegiance, and was entrusted with a large sum of money by the government to secure the submission of the clans. On 30 June 1691 he met the Jacobite chiefs; he persuaded them to refrain from acts of hostility until October, gaining their consent by threats and promises rather than by the distribution of the money, which, it was believed, he retained himself. When asked to give an account of the expenditure to parliament, he replied

The money is spent, the Highlands are quiet, and this is the only way of accounting between friends.

Breadalbane had a reputation for double-dealing which led to a lasting belief that he had a direct hand in the Massacre of the Macdonalds of Glen Coe in February 1692. In reality, he was one of the few men to recognize the political damage the episode caused in the Highlands and his efforts were chiefly in the realm of presenting peace terms on behalf of the crown [6]. However, the discovery of his negotiations with the Jacobite chiefs caused his imprisonment in Edinburgh Castle in September, but he was released when it was known that he had been acting with William's knowledge.

In 1696, Breadalbane became an investor in the Company of Scotland trading to Africa and the Indies, but was slow in meeting the requirements of his subscription. He did not meet his cash obligation until March 1699, after news that the Company's first expedition had landed at Darien reached Scotland.

Breadalbane did not vote for the Union in 1707, but was chosen a representative peer in the parliament of Great Britain of 1713–1715. His cooperation with the English government in securing the temporary submission of the Highlands was inspired by no real loyalty or allegiance, and he encouraged the attempted French dissent of 1708, refusing, however, to commit himself to paper.

On the occasion of the Jacobite rising in 1715 he excused himself on 19 September from obeying the summons to appear at Edinburgh on the ground of his age and infirmity, but nevertheless the next day visited Jacobite camps at Logierait and Perth, his real business being, according to the Master of Sinclair:

to trick others, not to be trickt, and to obtain a share of the French subsidies.

He had taken money to provide 1200 men to the uprising, and only sent 300. His 300 men were withdrawn after the Battle of Sheriffmuir, and his death, on 19 March 1717, removed the need for an inquiry into his conduct.

== Marriage and family ==
He married Lady Mary Rich, daughter of Henry Rich, 1st Earl of Holland and his wife Isabel Cope on 17 Dec 1657, with whom he had two sons, Duncan, styled Lord Ormelie (d. 1727), who was passed over in the succession 1685 due to his "mental incapacity", and John Campbell, 2nd Earl of Breadalbane and Holland (1662-1752). He married secondly 1678 Mary Campbell, widow of George Sinclair, the 6th Earl of Caithness, and daughter of Lady Margaret Douglas and Archibald Campbell, 1st Marquess of Argyll. By his second wife, he had a third son, Colin (d. 1708), who was the presumed ancestor (via an illegitimate son) of Sir Lachlan Campbell, one of the present contestants for the title of Earl of Breadalbane and Holland. He also had an illegitimate daughter, Mary Campbell (d. 1725), wife of Sir Archibald Cockburn, advocate, and mother of Sir Alexander Cockburn of Langton, 7th Bt. Lord Breadalbane died on 19 Mar 1717.

Ancestors of John Campbell, 1st Earl of Breadalbane and Holland

8. Sir Duncan Campbell, 1st Baronet
4. Sir Robert Campbell, 3rd Baronet
9. Lady Jean Stewart
2. Sir John Campbell, 4th Baronet
10. Lachlan 'Mor' Mackintosh, 16th of Mackintosh, 17th Chief of Clan Chattan
5. Isabel Mackintosh
11. Agnes Mackenzie
1. John Campbell, 1st Earl of Breadalbane and Holland
12. John Graham, 6th Earl of Menteith
6. William Graham, 7th Earl of Menteith
13. Mary Campbell
3. Lady Mary Graham
14. Patrick Gray, 6th Lord Gray
7. Agnes Gray
15. Mary Stewart

Peerage of Scotland
New creation	Earl of Breadalbane and Holland; 1681–1717	Succeeded by John Campbell
Preceded by George Sinclair	Earl of Caithness; 1672–1681 (Resigned)	Succeeded by George Sinclair
Baronetage of Nova Scotia
Preceded by John Campbell	Baronet (of Glenorchy); 1670–1717	Succeeded by John Campbell
