= John Campbell, 2nd Earl of Breadalbane and Holland =

Scottish nobleman

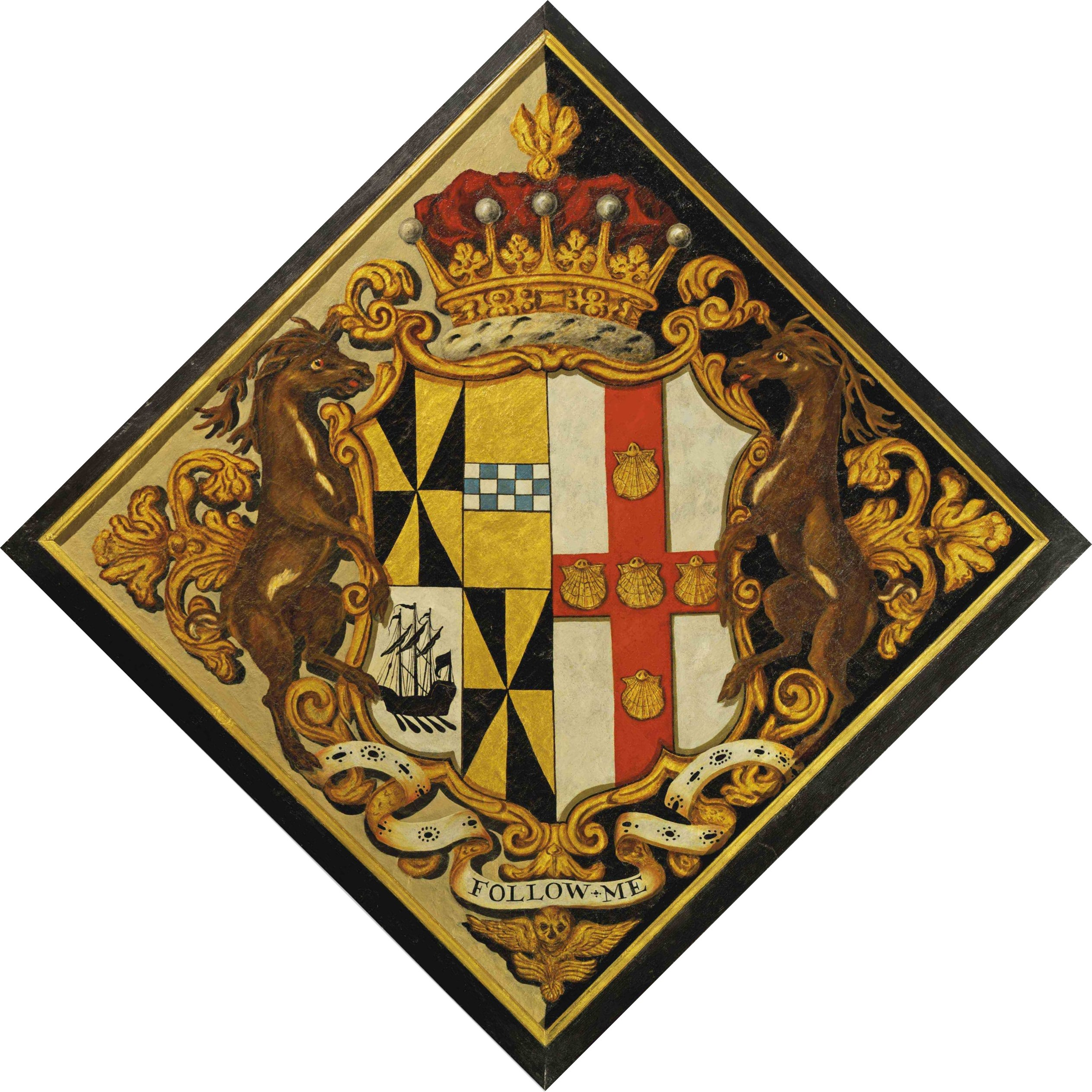
Funerary hatchment with the arms of Lady Henrietta Villiers, Countess of Breadalbane and Holland

John Campbell, 2nd Earl of Breadalbane and Holland (19 November 1662 – 23 February 1752) a Scottish nobleman born in Breadalbane to John Campbell, 1st Earl of Breadalbane and Holland and Lady Mary Rich.

In 1685 he married Lady Frances Cavendish, daughter of Henry Cavendish, 2nd Duke of Newcastle-upon-Tyne and Lady Frances Pierrepont. With no issue Lady Frances died on 4 February 1690.

On 23 May 1695 the Earl married a second time to Henrietta Villiers, daughter of Edward Villiers and Lady Frances Howard. They had three children including John Campbell, 3rd Earl of Breadalbane and Holland.

The Earl was commonly referred to as Lord Glenorchy. On 19 March 1717 he succeeded his father as the 2nd Earl of Breadalbane and Holland. He also could claim other titles such as the 6th Baronet Campbell of Glenorchy; 2nd Viscount of Tay and Paintland; and 2nd Lord Glenorchy, Benederaloch, Ormelie and Weick.

From 1725 to 1752 he was the Lord-Lieutenant of Perthshire and from 1736 to 1747 he held the office of Representative Peer. From 1746 until his death in 1752 he was Chief Justice in Eyre.

Owing to his eccentricity he was known as "Old Rag".

Peerage of Scotland
Preceded by John Campbell	Earl of Breadalbane and Holland; 1717–1752	Succeeded by John Campbell
