= List of listed buildings in Arisaig and Moidart =

This is a list of listed buildings in the parish of Arisaig and Moidart in Highland, Scotland.

== List ==
Name	Location	Date Listed	Grid Ref. (Note: Sometimes known as OSGB36, the grid reference (where provided) is based on the British national grid reference system used by the Ordnance Survey. • "Guide to National Grid". Ordnance Survey. • "Get-a-map". Ordnance Survey.)	Geo-coordinates	Notes	LB Number (Note: Historic Environment Scotland assign a unique alphanumeric identifier to each designated site in Scotland, for listed buildings this always begins with "LB", for example "LB12345".)	Image
Polnish, Our Lady Of The Braes Roman Catholic Church				56°52′55″N 5°41′34″W	Category B	43375	Upload Photo
Kinlochmoidart, Low Farm House	Kinlochmoidart			56°47′24″N 5°45′13″W	Category C(S)	289	Upload Photo
Polnish, Arnabol Railway Viaduct Over Arnabol Burn				56°53′20″N 5°42′51″W	Category B	297	Upload another image See more images
Roshven House Roshven, Including Courtyard Buildings, Garden Walls And Sundial				56°50′37″N 5°45′47″W	Category B	301	Upload Photo
Kinlochmoidart, Episcopal Church Of St Finnan	Kinlochmoidart			56°47′25″N 5°45′03″W	Category C(S)	316	Upload Photo
Kinlochmoidart House	Kinlochmoidart			56°47′13″N 5°44′26″W	Category A	317	Upload another image
Arisaig Railway Station, Ticket Office/Waiting Room And Signal Box	Arisaig			56°54′46″N 5°50′23″W	Category B	326	Upload another image See more images
Arisaig Village, Roman Catholic Church Of St Mary, Kilmory	Arisaig			56°54′52″N 5°50′50″W	Category C(S)	328	Upload Photo
Arisaig Village, Old Church And Burial Ground	Arisaig			56°54′51″N 5°50′52″W	Category B	329	Upload Photo
Arisaig, Arisaig House And Garden Walls				56°53′51″N 5°47′32″W	Category B	330	Upload Photo
Arisaig, Borrodale House				56°53′56″N 5°47′15″W	Category B	332	Upload Photo
Kinlochmoidart, Kinacarra (Former School And Schoolhouse	Kinlochmoidart			56°47′23″N 5°46′03″W	Category B	291	Upload Photo
Shiel Bridge, Old Bridge Over River Shiel				56°45′22″N 5°48′24″W	Category B	300	Upload Photo
Glenfinnan Barn And Steading				56°52′12″N 5°26′52″W	Category B	311	Upload Photo
Arisaig Village, High Land, 1-8 New Street	Arisaig			56°54′38″N 5°50′28″W	Category B	324	Upload Photo
Arisaig Village, Roman Catholic Church Of St Mary And Presbytery (Chapel House)	Arisaig			56°54′53″N 5°50′53″W	Category C(S)	327	Upload Photo
Loch Nam Uamh Railway Viaduct Over Gleann Mama				56°53′33″N 5°43′50″W	Category B	295	Upload another image See more images
Arisaig, Faire-Na-Sgurr				56°54′05″N 5°50′51″W	Category B	303	Upload Photo
Eilean Fhianain, St Finnan's Chapel And Burial Ground				56°45′07″N 5°40′42″W	Category A	306	Upload another image
Kinlochmoidart House, West Lodge Gatepiers And Flanking Walls	Kinlochmoidart			56°47′10″N 5°44′53″W	Category B	319	Upload Photo
Arisaig Village, Church Of Scotland Manse	Arisaig			56°54′41″N 5°50′35″W	Category C(S)	323	Upload Photo
Arisaig, Borrodale House Steading				56°53′57″N 5°47′15″W	Category B	333	Upload Photo
Arisaig, Borrodale Railway Viaduct Over The Borrodale Burn				56°54′12″N 5°46′59″W	Category A	302	Upload another image See more images
Back Of Keppoch, Barn/Byre And Stable, Sunnymead				56°55′27″N 5°51′19″W	Category B	304	Upload Photo
Glenfinnan, Roman Catholic Church Of Our Lady And St Finnan And Belfry				56°52′17″N 5°26′30″W	Category B	309	Upload another image
Kinlochmoidart, Ardmolich Bridge Over River Moidart	Kinlochmoidart			56°47′02″N 5°44′45″W	Category B	314	Upload Photo
Arisaig Village, Astley Hall	Arisaig			56°54′37″N 5°50′31″W	Category B	320	Upload Photo
Arisaig Village, Arisaig Church Primary School	Arisaig			56°54′40″N 5°50′33″W	Category C(S)	321	Upload Photo
Arisaig Village, Church Of Scotland	Arisaig			56°54′41″N 5°50′34″W	Category B	322	Upload Photo
Kinlochmoidart, Low Farm Steading	Kinlochmoidart			56°47′23″N 5°45′16″W	Category B	290	Upload Photo
Larichmore Road Bridge Over Brunery Burn				56°54′44″N 5°49′18″W	Category C(S)	293	Upload Photo
Larichmore Railway Viaduct Over Brunery Burn				56°54′44″N 5°49′18″W	Category B	292	Upload another image See more images
Shiel Bridge, Fishing Station By Dorlin, Store/Fish-House And Pier				56°46′27″N 5°49′44″W	Category C(S)	298	Upload Photo
Castle Tiorim (Eilean Tiorim)				56°47′04″N 5°49′45″W	Category A	305	Upload another image
Glenfinnan Monument	Glenfinnan			56°52′09″N 5°26′13″W	Category A	308	Upload another image See more images
Glenfinnan Railway Viaduct Over River Finnan	Glenfinnan			56°52′35″N 5°25′54″W	Category A	310	Upload another image See more images
Glenfinnan Railway Station, Ticket Office/Waiting Room and Signal Box	Glenfinnan			56°52′21″N 5°26′59″W	Category B	312	Upload another image See more images
Kinlochmoidart, Brunery Old Bridge	Kinlochmoidart			56°46′57″N 5°43′12″W	Category C(S)	315	Upload Photo
Arisaig Village, Keppoch House	Arisaig			56°54′44″N 5°51′12″W	Category B	325	Upload Photo
Arisaig, Arisaig House Gardener's Bothy				56°53′53″N 5°47′25″W	Category B	331	Upload Photo
Morar, Falls Of Morar Railway Viaduct Over River Morar				56°57′47″N 5°48′57″W	Category B	296	Upload Photo
Eilean Shona House (By Acharacle)				56°47′21″N 5°50′27″W	Category C(S)	307	Upload Photo
Glenuig Post Office				56°49′35″N 5°49′08″W	Category B	313	Upload Photo
Kinlochmoidart House, East Lodge	Kinlochmoidart			56°47′05″N 5°44′13″W	Category B	318	Upload Photo
Roshven Estate, The Square				56°50′33″N 5°45′26″W	Category C(S)	43852	Upload Photo
Loch Shiel, Howard Memorial				56°45′14″N 5°41′41″W	Category C(S)	294	Upload Photo
Shiel Bridge Road Bridge Over River Shiel				56°45′13″N 5°48′06″W	Category B	299	Upload Photo

== Key ==
The scheme for classifying buildings in Scotland is:

- Category A: "buildings of national or international importance, either architectural or historic; or fine, little-altered examples of some particular period, style or building type."
- Category B: "buildings of regional or more than local importance; or major examples of some particular period, style or building type, which may have been altered."
- Category C: "buildings of local importance; lesser examples of any period, style, or building type, as originally constructed or moderately altered; and simple traditional buildings which group well with other listed buildings."

In March 2016 there were 47,288 listed buildings in Scotland. Of these, 8% were Category A, and 50% were Category B, with the remaining 42% being Category C.

== See also ==
- List of listed buildings in Highland
