= List of sea lochs of Scotland =

For a list of Scottish bodies of freshwater please see List of lochs in Scotland.

Map of sea Lochs of Scotland compiled from this list

See the list of places in Scotland for other places.

There are numerous sea lochs around the Scottish coast, notably down the length of Scotland's western coast. A sea loch is a tidal inlet of the sea which may range in size from a few hundred metres across to a major body of seawater several tens of kilometres in length and more than 2 or 3 kilometres wide. Other tidal inlets include firths, voes and bays. The term "firth" is used in Orkney and Shetland to denote inlets of the sea of the type which might be labelled as lochs elsewhere in Scotland. They are not listed here. There is also a tidal embayment on the coast of the Solway Firth known as Manxman's Lake.

== A to Z listing of Scottish sea lochs ==
=== A ===
- Loch Ailort (Arisaig)
- Loch Ainort (Skye)
- Loch na h-Airde (Skye)
- Loch Aline (Morvern)
- Loch an Alltain Duibh (Wester Ross)
- Loch Alsh (Skye)
- Loch Ardbhair (Sutherland)
- Loch Arnish (Raasay)
- Loch Aulasary (North Uist)

=== B ===
- Loch Barraglom (Lewis)
- Loch Bay (Skye)
- Bays Loch (North Uist)
- Loch Beacravik (Harris)
- Loch Beag (Argyll)
- Loch Beag (Inverness-shire)
- Loch Beag (Sutherland)
- Loch Beag (Skye)
- Loch Beag (Loch Hourn)
- Loch Beag (off Loch nan Uamh, Arisaig)
- Loch Beg (Isle of Mull)
- Loch na Beiste (Skye)
- Loch Bhalamuis (Harris)
- Loch Bharcasaig (Skye)
- Loch a' Bhràige (Island of Rona) (off Skye)
- Loch Bhrollum (Lewis)
- Loch Blashaval (North Uist)
- Loch Boisdale (South Uist)
- Loch Bracadale (Skye)
- Loch Breachacha (Coll)
- Loch Brittle (Skye)
- Loch Broom (Wester Ross)
- Loch Buie
- Loch Bun Abhainn-eadar (Harris)

=== C ===
- Loch na Cairidh (Skye / Scalpay, Inner Hebrides)
- Campbeltown Loch
- Loch Caol (Isle of Mull)
- Loch Caolisport (Kintyre)
- Loch Carloway (Lewis)
- Loch Carnan (South Uist)
- Loch Caroy (Skye)
- Loch Carron (Wester Ross)
- Loch nan Ceall (Arisaig)
- Loch Ceann Hulavig (Lewis)
- Loch Ceann na Saile (Sutherland)
- Loch a' Chadh-fi (Sutherland)
- Loch a' Chàirn Bhàin (Sutherland)
- Loch a' Chnuic (Islay)
- Loch a' Choire (Kingairloch)
- Loch Chollaim (Harris)
- Loch a' Chracaich (Wester Ross)
- Loch na Cille (Argyll)
- Loch Claidh (Lewis)
- Loch Clash (Sutherland)
- Loch na Corrobha (Isle of Mull)
- Loch na Craignish (Argyll)
- Loch Cravadale (Harris)
- Loch na Creige Ruaidhe (Sutherland)
- Loch Creran
- Loch Crinan (Argyll)
- Loch na Cuilce (Skye)

=== D ===
- Loch na Dal (Skye)
- Loch Dhrombaig (Sutherland)
- Loch Diubaig (Skye)
- Loch Don (Isle of Mull)
- Loch na Droighniche (Sutherland)
- Loch Drovinish (Lewis)
- Loch Duhaill (Sutherland)
- Loch Duich (Inverness-shire)
- Loch Dunvegan (Skye)

=== E ===
- East Loch Roag (Lewis)
- East Loch Tarbert (Harris)
- East Loch Tarbert (Kintyre)
- Loch Eatharna (Coll)
- Loch Eil (west of Fort William)
- Loch an Eilean (Skye)
- Loch an Eisg-brachaidh (Wester Ross)
- Loch Eishort (Skye)
- Loch Mic Phail (North Uist)
- Loch Eport
- Loch Erghallan (Skye)
- Loch Eriboll (Sutherland)
- Loch Erisort (Lewis)
- Loch Etive
- Loch Ewe (Wester Ross)
- Loch Eynort (South Uist)
- Loch Eyre (off Loch Snizort Beag) (Skye)

=== F ===
- Loch na Faolinn (Skye)
- Loch Feochan (south of Oban)
- Loch Finsbay (Harris)
- Loch Fleet (Sutherland)
- Loch Flodabay (Harris)
- Loch Fyne, the longest of the sea lochs

=== G ===
- Gair Loch (or Loch Gairloch) in (Wester Ross)
- Gare Loch, home of Faslane Naval Base
- Loch Gair (Argyll)
- Loch Gheocrab (Harris)
- Loch Gilp (Argyll)
- Loch Glencoul (Sutherland)
- Loch Glendhu (Sutherland)
- Loch Goil (Argyll)
- Loch Gortan (Coll)
- Loch Greshornish (Skye)
- Loch Grosebay (Harris)
- Loch Gruinart (Islay)

=== H ===
- Loch Harport (Skye)
- Holy Loch, formerly the site of a US Navy nuclear submarine base
- Loch Hourn
- Loch Hunish (Skye)
- Loch Hurivag (North Uist)

=== I, J, K ===
- Loch Inchard (Sutherland)
- Loch Indaal (Islay)
- Loch Inver (Sutherland)
- Loch Kanaird (Wester Ross)
- Loch na Keal (Isle of Mull)
- Loch Keiravagh (Benbecula)
- Loch Kerry (Wester Ross)
- Loch Kilerivagh (Benbecula)
- Loch Kirkaig (Sutherland)
- Loch Kishorn (Wester Ross)

=== L ===
- Loch Laich (Appin)
- Loch a' Laip (Benbecula)
- Loch Langass (North Uist)
- Loch Laphroaig (Islay)
- Loch na Làthach (Isle of Mull)
- Loch Laxford (Sutherland)
- Loch nan Leachd (Skye)
- Loch Leodamais (Islay)
- Loch Leosavay (Harris)
- Loch Leurbost (Lewis)
- Loch Leven, near Glen Coe
- Loch Linnhe, at the southern end of the Great Glen
- Little Loch Broom (Wester Ross)
- Little Loch Roag (Lewis)
- Loch Long, Argyll & Bute
- Loch Long, near Kyle of Lochalsh
- Loch Losait (Skye)

=== M ===
- Loch Maaruig (Harris)
- Loch Maddy (North Uist)
- Manxman's Lake (Galloway) (Scotland's only 'sea-lake'?)
- Loch Meanervagh (Benbecula)
- Loch Meavaig (Harris)
- Loch Melfort (Argyll)
- Loch Mharabhig (Lewis)
- Loch Mic Phail (North Uist)
- Loch Mingary (Isle of Mull)
- Loch Minish (North Uist)
- Loch Moidart (Moidart)
- Lochan Mór (Isle of Mull)

=== N, O ===
- Loch Nedd (Sutherland)
- Loch Nevis (Lochaber)
- Loch Odhairn (Lewis)

=== P, Q ===
- Loch Paible (North Uist)
- Loch Pooltiel (Skye)
- Loch Portain (North Uist)
- Loch Portree (Skye)

=== R ===
- Loch Ranza (Isle of Arran)
- Loch Resort (Lewis / Harris)
- Loch Riddon (or Loch Ruel) off the Kyles of Bute
- Loch Risay (Great Bernera) (Western Isles)
- Loch Roag (Lewis)
- Loch Rodel (Harris)
- Loch Roe (Sutherland)
- Loch an Ròin (Sutherland)
- Loch Ruel (or Loch Riddon) off the Kyles of Bute
- Loch Ryan

=== S ===
- Loch Sàile (Harris)
- Loch an t-Sailein (Islay)
- Loch Scadabay (Harris)
- Loch Scavaig (Skye)
- Loch Scresort (Rùm)
- Loch Scridain (Isle of Mull)
- Loch Seaforth (Lewis / Harris)
- Loch a' Sguirr (Raasay)
- Loch Shark (Sutherland)
- Loch Shawbost (Lewis)
- Loch Sheilavaig (South Uist)
- Loch Shell (or Loch Sealg) (Lewis)
- Loch Shieldaig (off Gairloch) (Wester Ross)
- Loch Shieldaig (Wester Ross)
- Loch Shira (Argyll)
- Loch Siginish (North Uist)
- Loch Skipport (South Uist)
- Loch Slapin (Skye)
- Loch Sligachan (Skye)
- Loch Snizort (Skye)
- Loch Snizort Beag (Skye)
- Loch Spelve (Isle of Mull)
- Loch Stockinish (Harris)
- Loch Striven (Argyll)
- Loch an Stroim (Lewis)
- Loch Sunart
- Loch Sween (Argyll)

=== T ===
- Loch Tarbert (Isle of Jura)
- Loch Tamanavay (Lewis)
- Loch Teacuis (Morvern)
- Loch Tealasvay (Lewis)
- Loch Thorasdaidh (Lewis)
- Loch Thùrnaig (Wester Ross)
- Loch Torridon (Wester Ross)
- Loch Toscaig (Wester Ross)
- Loch Treaslane (Skye)
- Loch a Tuath (or 'Broad Bay') (Lewis)
- Loch Tuath (Isle of Mull)

=== U, V, W, X, Y, Z ===
- Loch nan Uamh (Arisaig)
- Loch na h-Uamha (Harris)
- Loch na h-Uidhe (Taransay)
- Upper Loch Torridon (Wester Ross)
- Loch Uiskevagh (Benbecula)
- Loch Ussie (Ross-Shire)
- Loch Vatten (Skye)
- West Loch Roag (Lewis)
- West Loch Tarbert (Harris)
- West Loch Tarbert (Kintyre)

== See also ==
- List of lochs in Scotland
