= 1746 =

1746 in various calendars
- Gregorian calendar: 1746; MDCCXLVI
- Ab urbe condita: 2499
- Armenian calendar: 1195; ԹՎ ՌՃՂԵ
- Assyrian calendar: 6496
- Balinese saka calendar: 1667–1668
- Bengali calendar: 1152–1153
- Berber calendar: 2696
- British Regnal year: 19 Geo. 2 – 20 Geo. 2
- Buddhist calendar: 2290
- Burmese calendar: 1108
- Byzantine calendar: 7254–7255
- Chinese calendar: 乙丑年 (Wood Ox); 4443 or 4236 — to — 丙寅年 (Fire Tiger); 4444 or 4237
- Coptic calendar: 1462–1463
- Discordian calendar: 2912
- Ethiopian calendar: 1738–1739
- Hebrew calendar: 5506–5507
- Hindu calendars
- Vikram Samvat: 1802–1803
- Shaka Samvat: 1667–1668
- Kali Yuga: 4846–4847
- Holocene calendar: 11746
- Igbo calendar: 746–747
- Iranian calendar: 1124–1125
- Islamic calendar: 1158–1159
- Japanese calendar: Enkyō 3 (延享３年)
- Javanese calendar: 1670–1671
- Julian calendar: Gregorian minus 11 days
- Korean calendar: 4079
- Minguo calendar: 166 before ROC 民前166年
- Nanakshahi calendar: 278
- Thai solar calendar: 2288–2289
- Tibetan calendar: ཤིང་མོ་གླང་ལོ་ (female Wood-Ox); 1872 or 1491 or 719 — to — མེ་ཕོ་སྟག་ལོ་ (male Fire-Tiger); 1873 or 1492 or 720

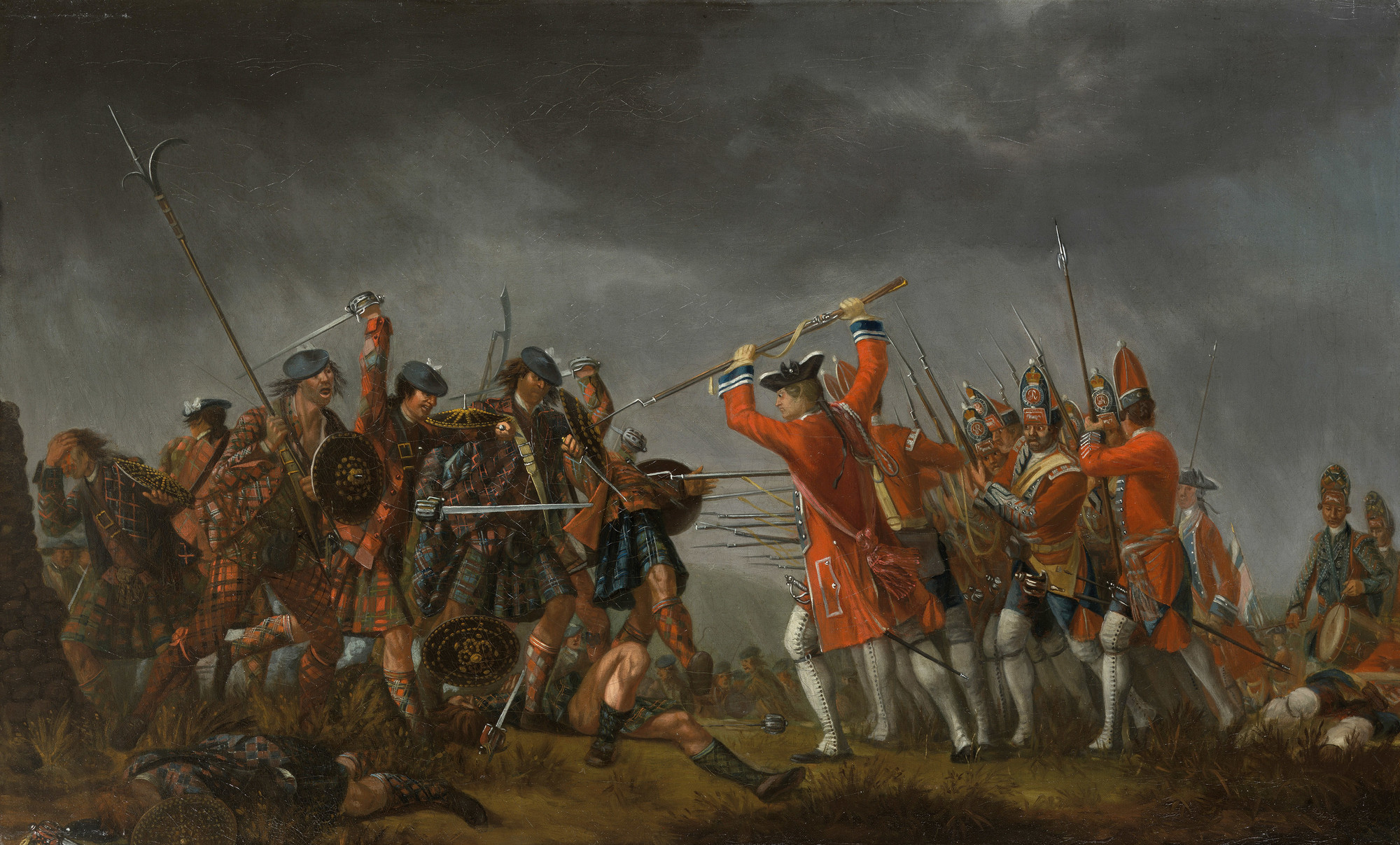
April 16: The last Jacobite rising is defeated in Britain at the Battle of Culloden.

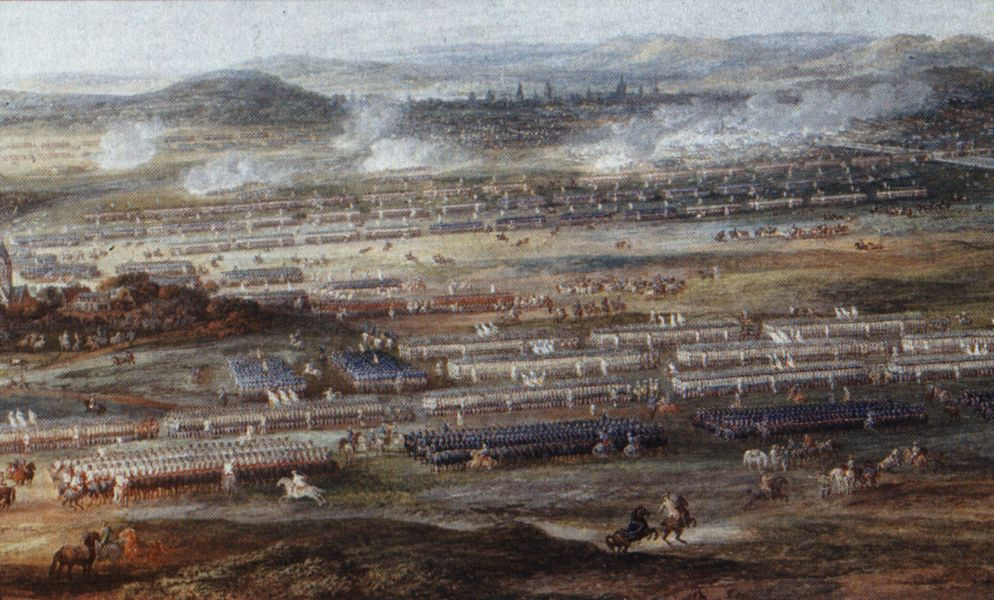
October 11: Battle of Rocoux

1746 (MDCCXLVI) was a common year starting on Saturday of the Gregorian calendar and a common year starting on Wednesday of the Julian calendar, the 1746th year of the Common Era (CE) and Anno Domini (AD) designations, the 746th year of the 2nd millennium, the 46th year of the 18th century, and the 7th year of the 1740s decade. As of the start of 1746, the Gregorian calendar was 11 days ahead of the Julian calendar, which remained in localized use until 1923.

== Events ==
=== January–March ===
- January 8 – The Young Pretender Charles Edward Stuart occupies Stirling, Scotland.
- January 17 – Battle of Falkirk Muir: British Government forces are defeated by Jacobite forces.
- February 1 – Jagat Singh II, the ruler of the Mewar Kingdom, inaugurates his Lake Palace on the island of Jag Niwas in Lake Pichola, in what is now the state of Rajasthan in northwest India.
- February 19 – Prince William, Duke of Cumberland, issues a proclamation offering an amnesty to participants in the Jacobite rebellion, directing them that they can avoid punishment if they turn their weapons in to their local Presbyterian church.
- February 22 – Brussels, at the time part of the Austrian Netherlands, surrenders to France's Marshal Maurice de Saxe.
- March 10 – Zakariya Khan Bahadur, the Mughal Empire's viceroy administering Lahore (in what is now Pakistan), orders the massacre of the city's Sikh people.

=== April–June ===
- April 16 – The Battle of Culloden in Scotland, the final pitched battle fought on British soil, brings an end to the Jacobite rising of 1745.
- May 27 – The three Scottish leaders of the Jacobite uprising— the Earl of Kilmarnock, Lord Balmerino, and Lord Lovat— are imprisoned for treason in the Tower of London, where they are held by the British government until their execution. Boyd and Balmerino are beheaded in August, while Fraser is not put to death until April 1747.
- June 16 – Battle of Piacenza: Austrian forces defeat French and Spanish troops.
- June 18 – Samuel Johnson is contracted to write his A Dictionary of the English Language.
- June 29 – Catherine of Ricci (b. 1522) is canonized.

=== July–September ===
- July 3 – Father Joachim Royo, the last of the five Spanish Catholic missionaries to Fuzhou in China, is captured by Chinese authorities, after having spent three decades defying orders to not evangelize. He and three fellow priests are put to death two years later, on October 28, 1748.
- July 9 – King Philip V of Spain dies, after a reign of more than 45 years. His oldest living son succeeds him, as Ferdinand VI.
- August 1 – The wearing of the kilt is banned in Scotland by the Dress Act, which comes into force one year later, on August 1, 1747.
- August 18 – Two of the four rebellious Scottish lords, Earl of Kilmarnock and Lord Balmerinoch, are beheaded in the Tower of London (Lord Lovat is executed in 1747).
- September 20 – Bonnie Prince Charlie flees to the Isle of Skye from Arisaig, after the unsuccessful Jacobite rising of 1745, marked by the Prince's Cairn on the banks of Loch nan Uamh.

=== October–December ===
- October 11 – War of the Austrian Succession – Battle of Rocoux: The French army defeats the allied Austrian, British, Hanoveran and Dutch army in Rocourt.
- October 22 – The College of New Jersey is founded in Princetown, New Jersey. In 1896, it is renamed Princeton University.
- October 28 – An earthquake demolishes Lima and Callao, in Peru.
- November 4 – Anwaruddin Khan, the Nawab of the Arcot State in South India, is driven back by the Captain Louis Paradis of the French Army after he and 10,000 soldiers attempt to drive the French back out of Madras.
- December 5 – Rallied by a teenage boy, Giovanni Battista Perasso (nicknamed Balilla"), the citizens of the Republic of Genoa rise up against the Austrian occupying troops and the collaborator Military Governor, the Genoese Marquis of Botta d'Adorno. By December 11, the Austrian soldiers are driven from the Italian city-state, but return a few months later.

=== Date unknown ===
- Eva Ekeblad reports her discovery, of how to make flour and alcohol from potatoes, to the Royal Swedish Academy of Sciences.
- The town of Vilkovo (Odes'ka oblast', Ukraine) is founded.
- Gabriel Johnston, British Governor of the Province of North Carolina, moves to New Bern, the province's largest. New Bern replaces Edenton as the capital of North Carolina until Raleigh is established in 1792.
- Charles Batteux's Les beaux-arts réduits à un même principe is published in Paris, putting forward for the first time the idea of "les beaux arts": "the fine arts".

== Births ==
- January 4 – Benjamin Rush, a Founding Father of the United States (d. 1813)
- January 12 – Johann Heinrich Pestalozzi, Swiss pedagogue (d. 1827)
- January 24 – King Gustav III of Sweden (d. 1792)

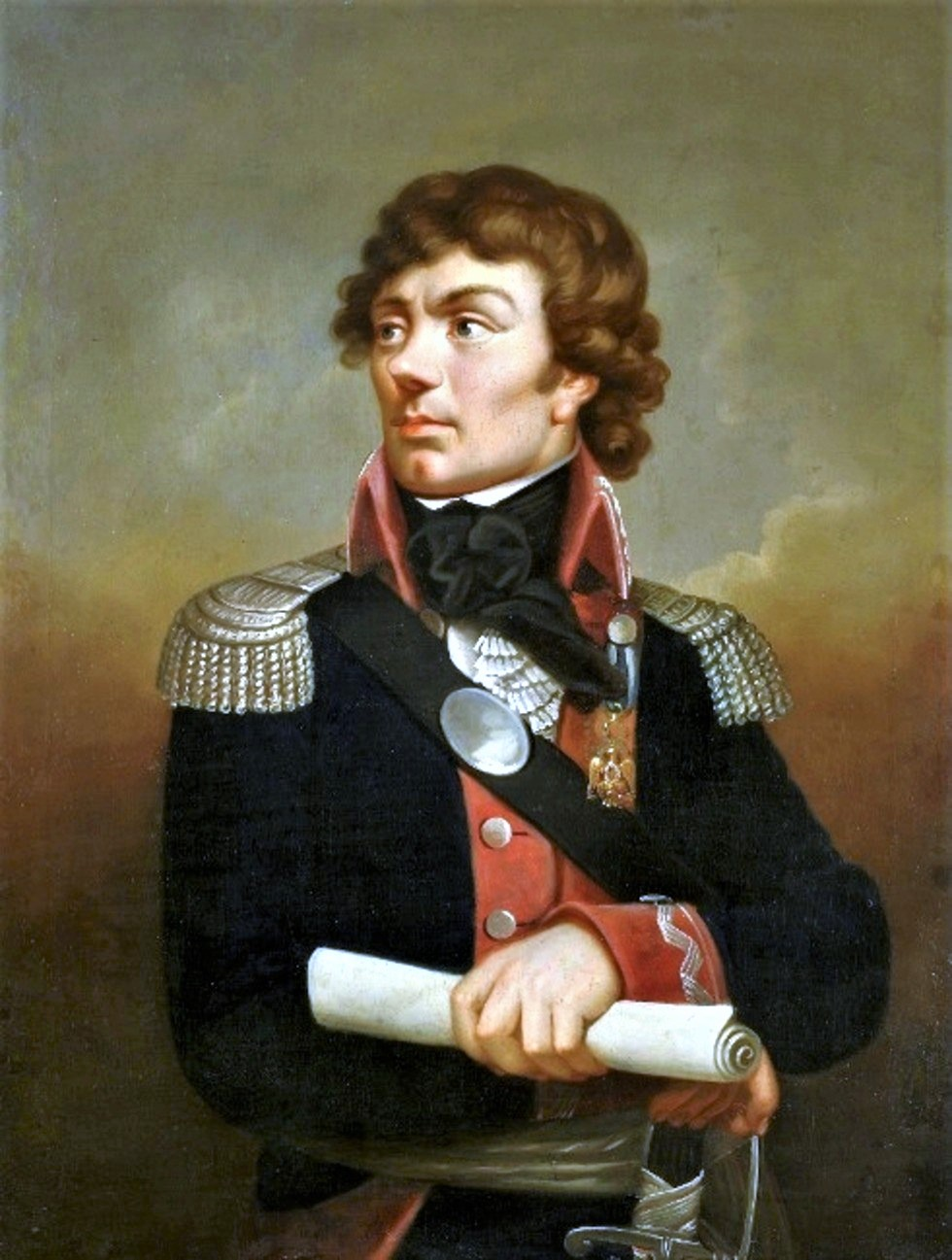
Tadeusz Kościuszko

- February 4 – Tadeusz Kościuszko, Polish general and nationalist (d. 1817)
- February 25 – Charles Cotesworth Pinckney, American politician and soldier (d. 1825)
- March 3 – Izabela Czartoryska, Polish magnate princess (d. 1835)
- March 7 – André Michaux, French botanist (d. 1802)

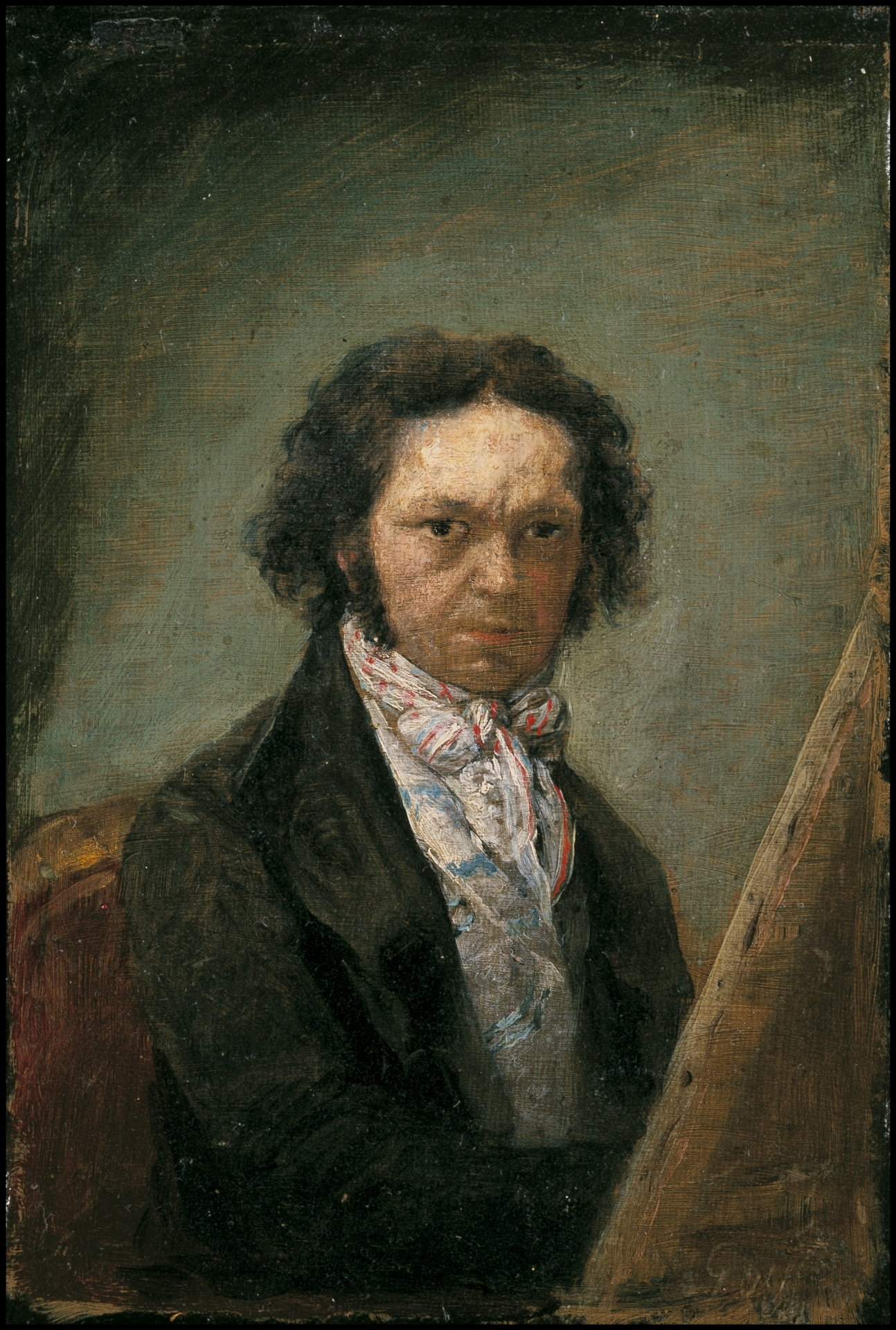
Francisco Goya

- March 30 – Francisco Goya, Spanish painter (d. 1828)
- April 4 – John Andrews, American clergyman, Provost of the University of Pennsylvania (d. 1813)
- May 9 – Gaspard Monge, French mathematician and geometer (d. 1818)
- June 3 – James Hook, English composer (d. 1827)
- July 3 – Henry Grattan, Irish politician (d. 1820)
- July 16 – Giuseppe Piazzi, Italian astronomer (d. 1826)
- July 23 – Bernardo de Gálvez, Spanish military leader, aids the United States in its quest for independence in the American Revolutionary War (d. 1786)
- July 30 – Louise du Pierry, French astronomer (d. 1807)
- September 28 – Sir William Jones, English philologist (d. 1794)
- October 7 – William Billings, American composer (d. 1800)
- November 27 – Robert R. Livingston, American signer of the Declaration of Independence (d. 1813)
- December 29 – Saverio Cassar, Gozitan priest and rebel leader (d. 1805)
- date unknown
  - Hong Liangji, Chinese scholar, statesman, political theorist and philosopher
  - Isaac Swainson, English botanist (d. 1812)
  - Victor d'Hupay, French philosopher and writer (d. 1818)
  - Ekaterina Kozitskaya, Russian industrialist (d. 1833)
  - Ebenezer Pemberton, American educator (d. 1835)

== Deaths ==
- February 4 – Robert Blair, Scottish poet and cleric (b. 1699)
- February 8 – Anton Josef Kirchweger, German writer
- February 26 – Thomas Watson, 3rd Earl of Rockingham, British politician (b. 1715)
- February 28 – Hermann von der Hardt, German historian (b. 1660)
- March 18 – Grand Duchess Anna Leopoldovna of Russia, regent of Russia (b. 1718)
- March 20 – Nicolas de Largillière, French painter (b. 1656)
- April 29 – William Flower, 1st Baron Castle Durrow, Irish politician (b. 1685)
- May 6 – William Tennent, Scottish-American theologian (b. 1673)
- May 13 – James Drummond, 3rd Duke of Perth, British noble (b. 1713)
- May 22 – Thomas Southerne, Irish playwright (b. 1660)
- June 14 – Colin Maclaurin, Scottish mathematician (b. 1698)
- July 2 – Thomas Baker, English antiquarian (b. 1656)

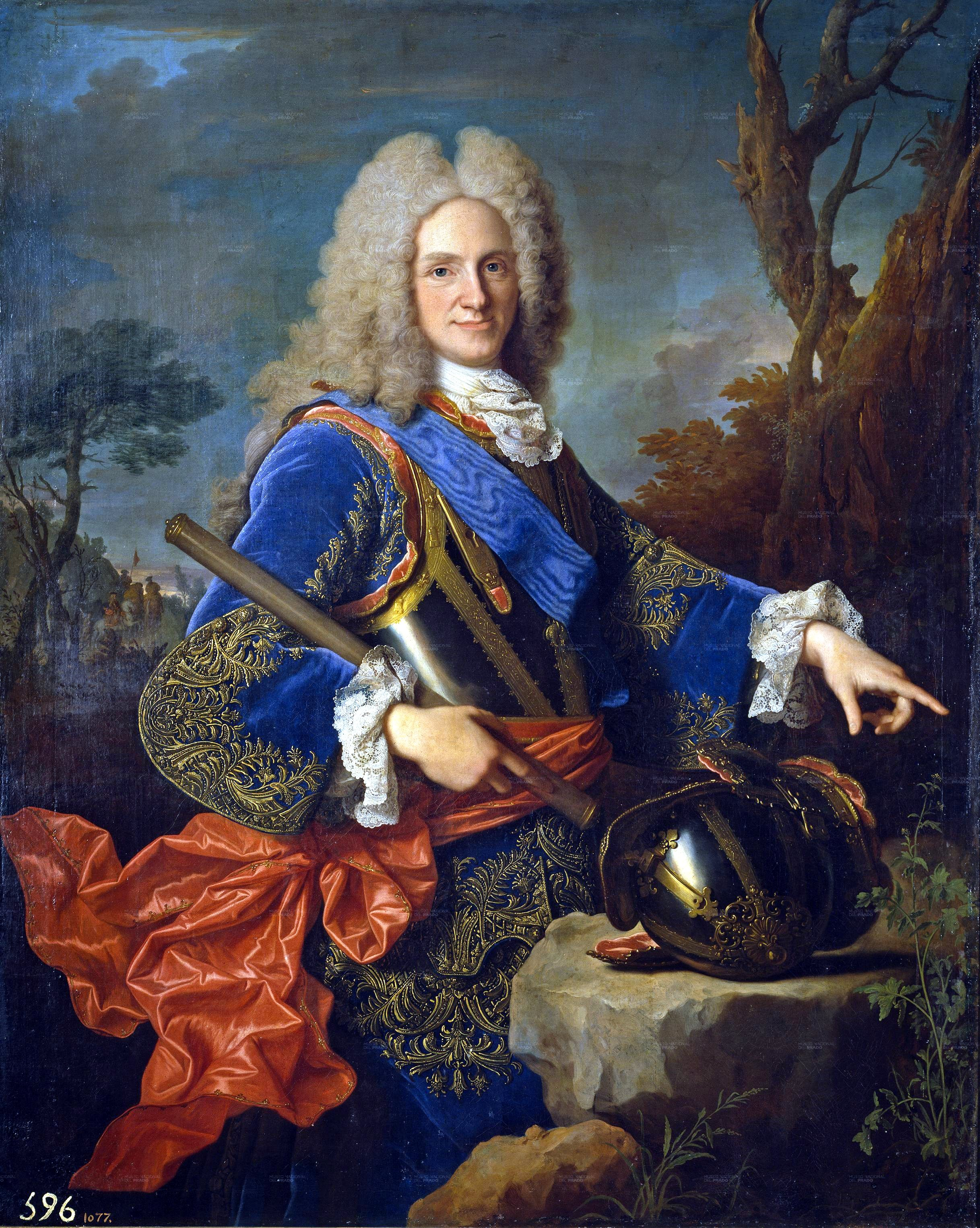
Philip V of Spain

- July 9 – King Philip V of Spain (b. 1683)
- July 28 – John Peter Zenger, American printer, whose court case advanced freedom of the press in the American colonies (b. 1697)
- July 30 – Francesco Trevisani, Italian painter (b. 1656)
- August 6 – Christian VI, King of Denmark and Norway (b. 1699)
- August 8 – Francis Hutcheson, Irish philosopher (b. 1694)
- September 25 – St George Gore-St George, Irish politician (b. 1722)
- October 2 – Josiah Burchett, English Secretary of the Admiralty (b. c. 1666)
- November 14 – Georg Steller, German naturalist (b. 1709)
- December 6 – Lady Grizel Baillie, Scottish poet (b. 1665)
- December 8 – Charles Radclyffe, British politician and rebel, by beheading after being convicted of treason against the Crown (b. 1693)
