= Glenfinnan =

Coordinates: 56°52′15″N 05°26′47″W

Glenfinnan: Scottish Gaelic: Gleann Fhionnain
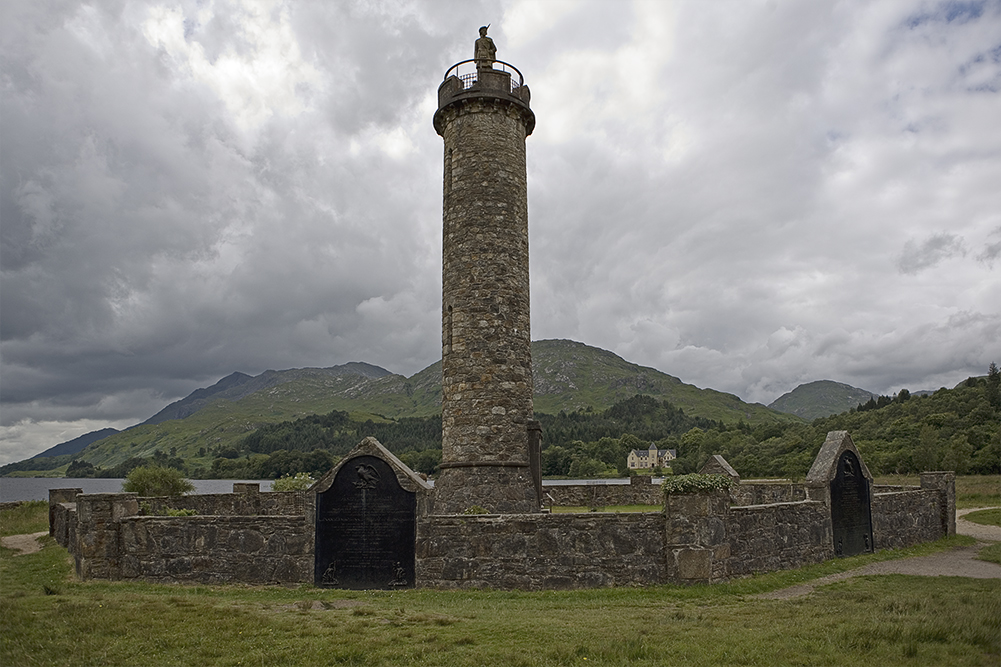
- Glenfinnan Monument

- Location within the Lochaber area
- Population: 139 (2011)
- OS grid reference: NM897803
- Council area: Highland
- Lieutenancy area: Inverness-shire
- Country: Scotland
- Sovereign state: United Kingdom
- Post town: GLENFINNAN
- Postcode district: PH37
- Dialling code: 01397
- Police: Scotland
- Fire: Scottish
- Ambulance: Scottish

Glenfinnan (Scottish Gaelic: Gleann Fhionnain [klan̪ˠˈʝũn̪ˠɛɲ]) is a hamlet in Lochaber area of the Highlands of Scotland. In 1745 the Jacobite rising began here when Prince Charles Edward Stuart ("Bonnie Prince Charlie") raised his standard on the shores of Loch Shiel. Seventy years later, the 18 m (60 ft) Glenfinnan Monument, at the head of the loch, was erected to commemorate the historic event.

== History ==
Charles Edward Stuart landed from France on Eriskay in the Western Isles, travelling to the mainland in a small rowing boat, coming ashore at the Sound of Arisaig just west of Glenfinnan. Upon his arrival on the Scottish mainland, he was met by a small group of men from Clan Donald. Stuart waited at Glenfinnan as more Highlanders from the Donald, Cameron, Macfie and MacDonnell clans arrived.

On 19 August 1745, after Stuart judged he had enough military support, he climbed the hill near Glenfinnan as MacMaster of Glenaladale raised his royal standard. Stuart announced to all the mustered clans he claimed the British throne in the name of his father James Francis Edward Stuart. A member of Clan Macfie was one of two pipers with Stuart as he raised his banner above Glenfinnan. After claiming the British throne, brandy was distributed to the assembled Highlanders to celebrate the occasion.

Eight months later, the Jacobite rising of 1745 ended in failure at the Battle of Culloden on 16 April 1746. Many members of Clan Macfies from Glenfinnan followed Donald Cameron of Lochiel on the right flank of the Jacobite Army at the battle. Stuart returned to the area after the battle of Culloden during his flight to evade government troops led by Prince William, Duke of Cumberland. After taking refuge with loyal supporters, he boarded a French Navy frigate on the shores of Loch nan Uamh close to where he landed and raised his standard the previous year. The Young Pretender died in Rome in 1788 without setting foot on Scottish soil again. The Prince's Cairn marks the spot from where he departed into exile.

== Monument ==
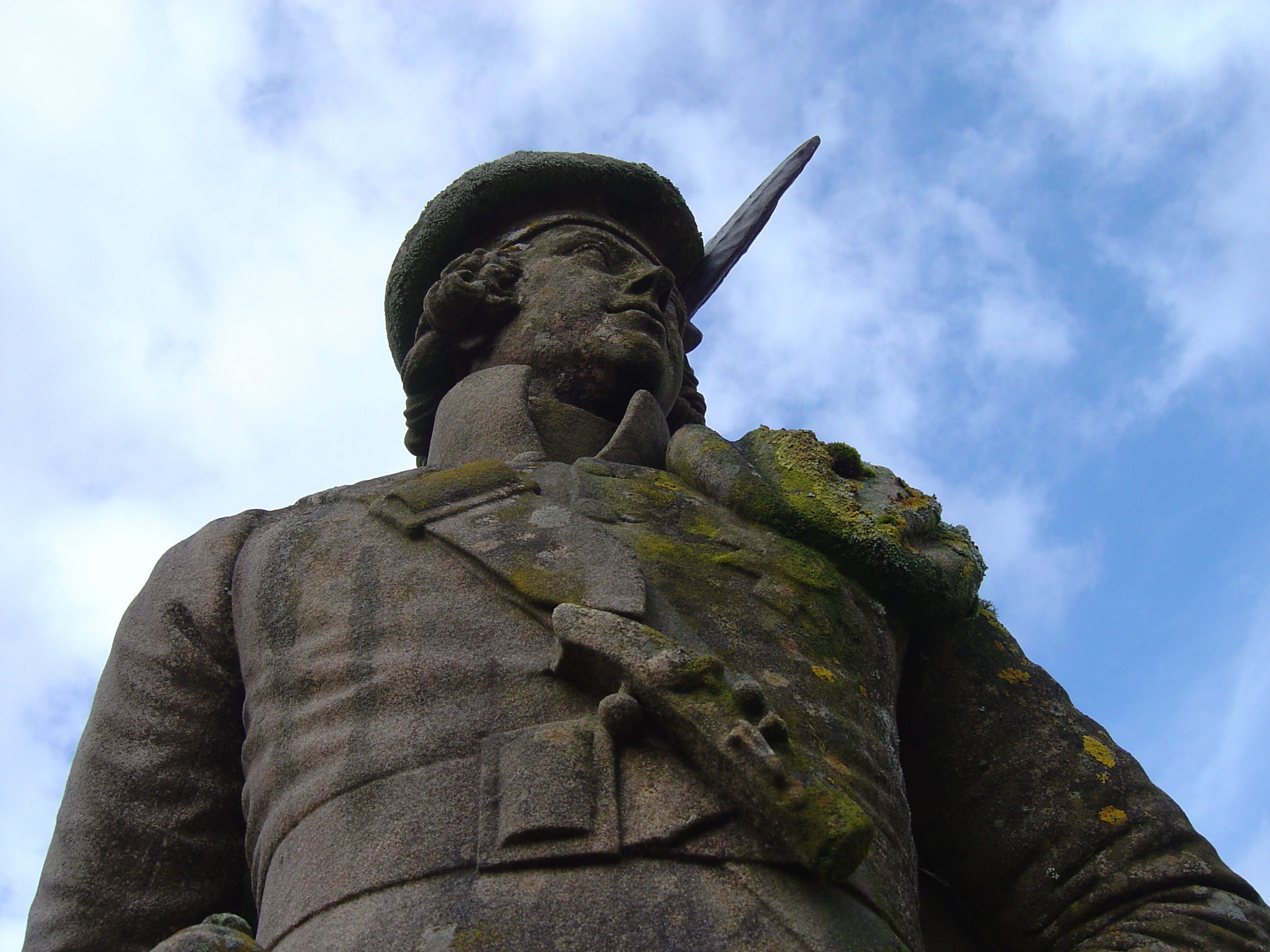
The Unknown Highlander

By 1815, the Jacobite cause was no longer a political threat to the Hanoverian monarchy. Alexander Macdonald of Glenaladale, a minor branch of the Clan Donald, built a memorial tower at Glenfinnan to commemorate the raising of the standard of the Young Pretender. The tower, which is 18 metres in height, was designed by the Scottish architect James Gillespie Graham. The tower's construction was funded partially by the wealth accrued from slave plantations in Jamaica owned by Macdonald's father, also named Alexander. The statue of an anonymous Highlander, made by John Greenshields and referred to at the point of commission as Stuart himself, was added in 1835.

== Railway ==
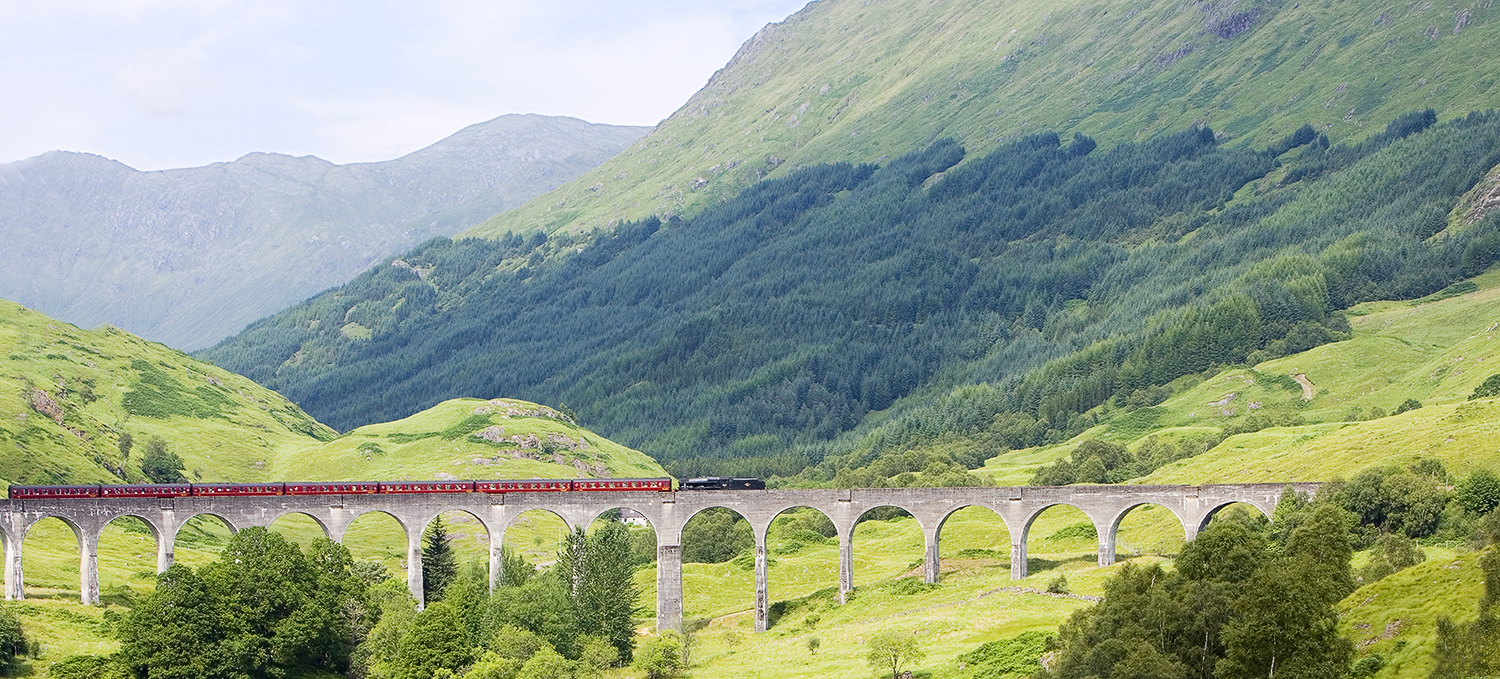
Glenfinnan Viaduct and steam train at Glenfinnan

=== Station ===
Glenfinnan is about halfway between Fort William and Mallaig on the picturesque West Highland Railway. Along with a regular rail service by ScotRail, the line is used by the Jacobite steam train. A private railway museum operates at the station, using the former booking-office, the disused signalbox, and some stored coaches.

=== Viaduct ===
Sir Robert McAlpine constructed the Glenfinnan Viaduct between 1897 and 1898. The structure, which is built entirely out of concrete, has 21 arches with spans of 15 m (49 ft) and reaches a height of 30 m (100 ft) above the valley. To commemorate the viaduct's centenary in 1997, a plaque was unveiled at the base of one of its arches.

The landscape in which the viaduct is located has made it popular with film producers. In 1969, it was used in Ring of Bright Water, starring Bill Travers and Virginia McKenna. It has since come to prominence in the cinematic releases of the Harry Potter series. The Hogwarts Express, is filmed crossing the viaduct in several of the films beginning with Harry Potter and the Chamber of Secrets in 2002. The train filmed is the Jacobite Steam-Locomotive Train, a tourist train.

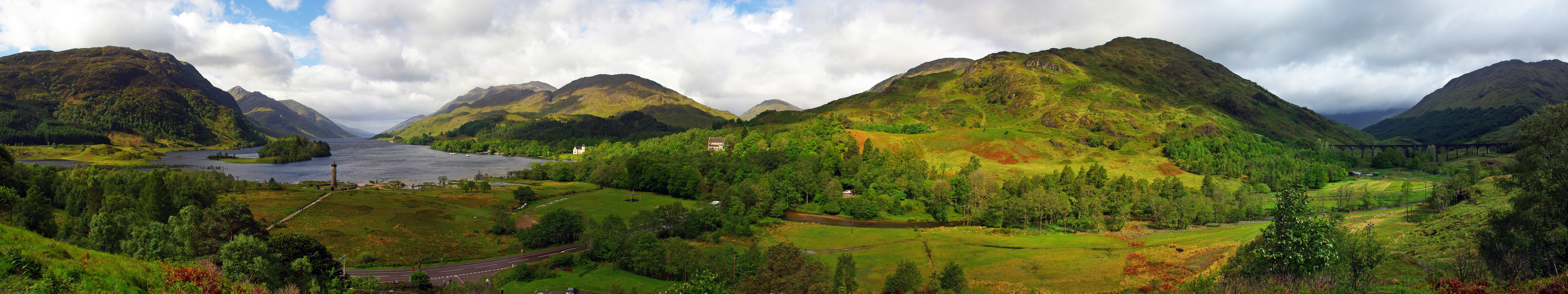
Loch Shiel and the memorial to the Jacobites; Glenfinnan Viaduct is on the far right

== In popular culture ==
In the Highlander universe, Connor and Duncan MacLeod are both Scots born in Glenfinnan in 1518 and 1592, respectively. Eilean Donan castle is used as a stand-in for Glenfinnan in the franchise.
