= Glenfinnan Viaduct =

Railway viaduct in the Highlands, Scotland

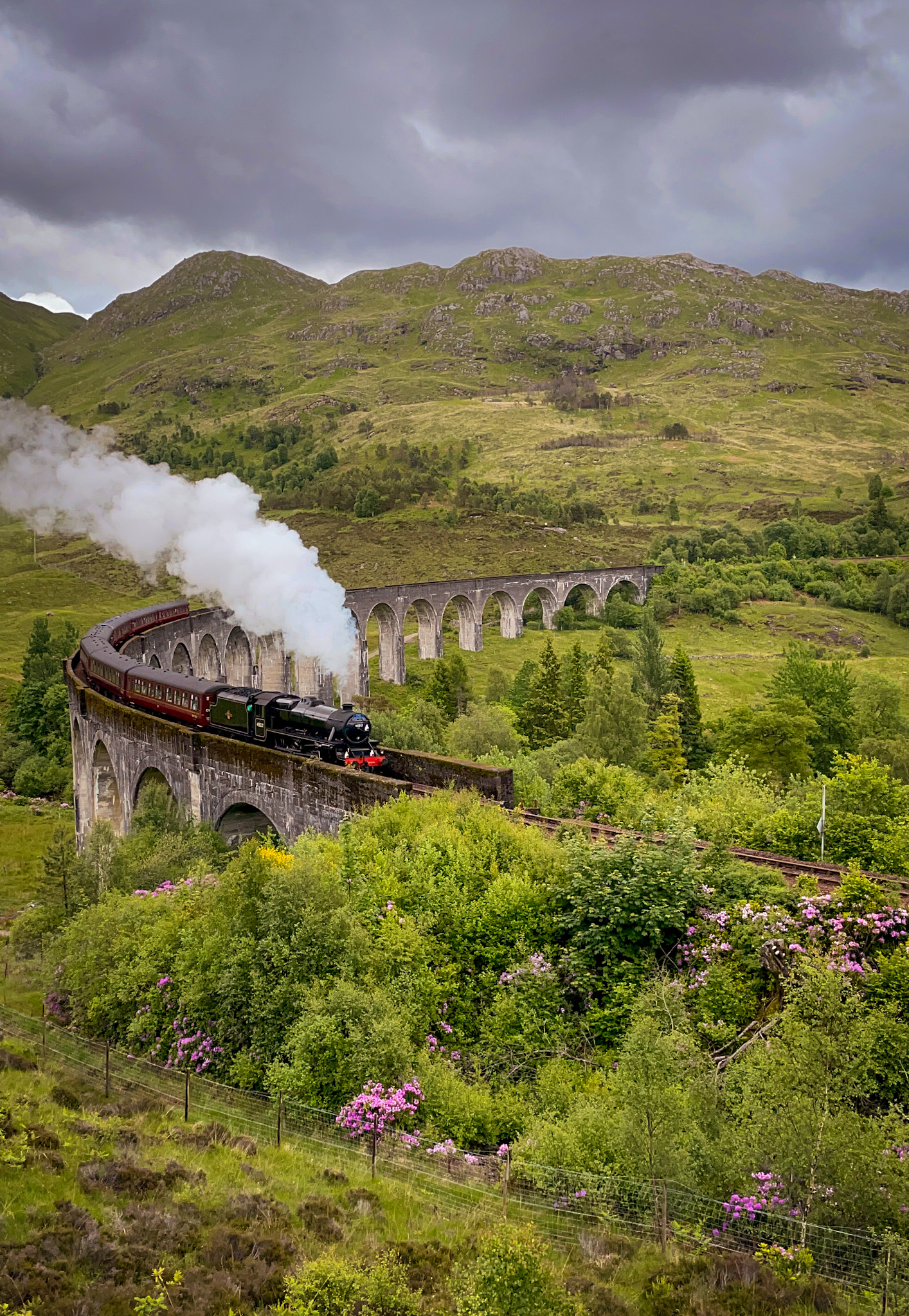
- The Jacobite steam train crossing the viaduct in 2022
- Coordinates: 56.876285°N 5.431914°W
- Carries: West Highland Line
- Crosses: River Finnan
- Owner: Network Rail

Characteristics
- Material: Concrete
- Total length: 1,250 feet (380 m)
- Height: 100 feet (30 m)
- Longest span: 50 feet (15 m)
- No. of spans: 21

History
- Designer: Simpson & Wilson and Robert McAlpine & Sons
- Construction start: 1897
- Construction end: October 1898
- Opened: 1 April 1901

Listed Building – Category A
- Official name: Glenfinnan Railway Viaduct Over River Finnan
- Designated: 4 October 1971
- Reference no.: LB310

Location
- Interactive map of Glenfinnan Viaduct

The Glenfinnan Viaduct is a railway viaduct on the West Highland Line at Glenfinnan, in the Lochaber district of north-western Scotland, built from 1897 to 1901. Located at the top of Loch Shiel in the West Scottish Highlands, the viaduct overlooks the Glenfinnan Monument and the waters of Loch Shiel.

== Construction ==
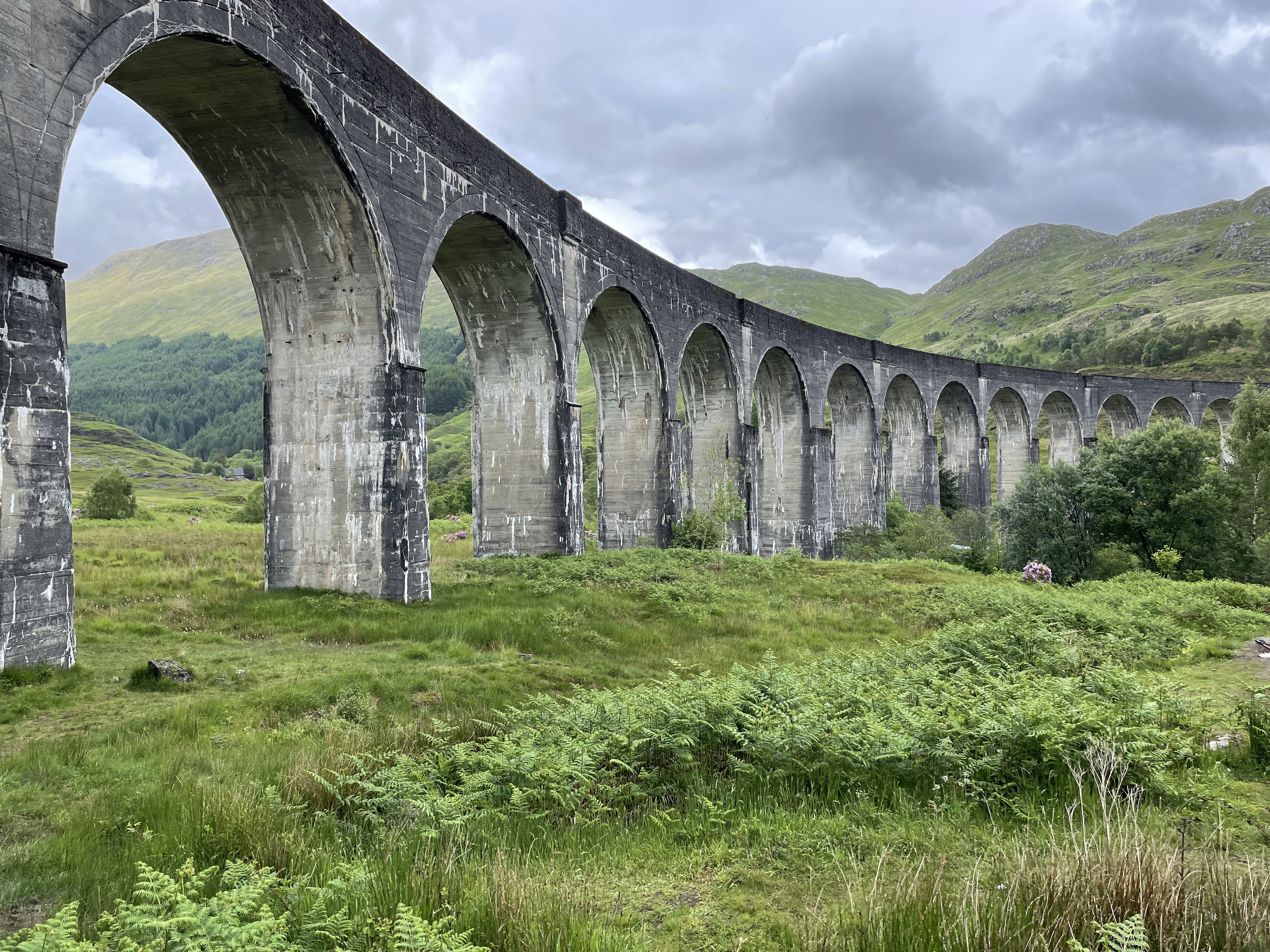
Thirteen of the viaduct's twenty-one arches

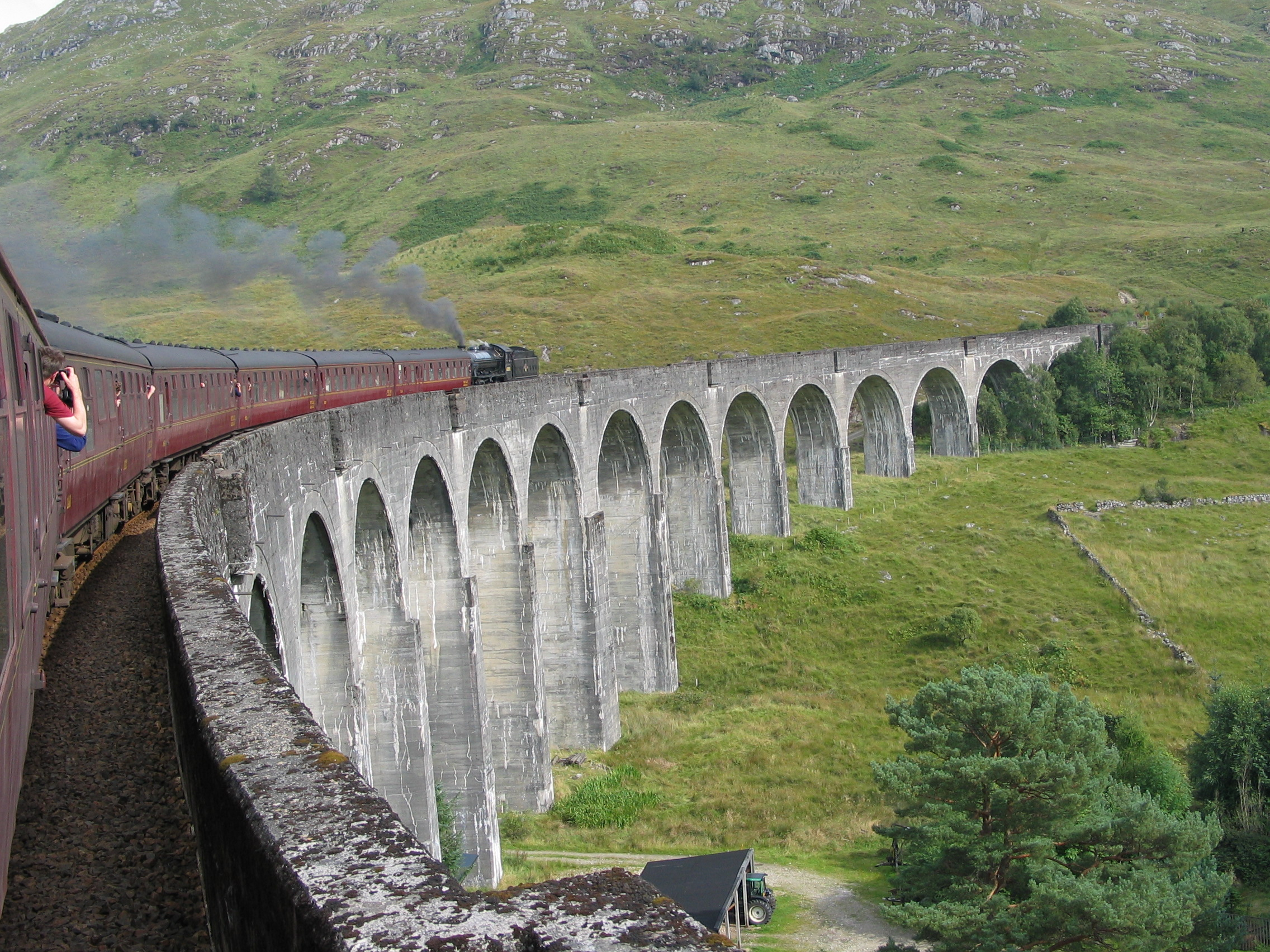
View from a train on the viaduct

The West Highland Railway was built to Fort William by Lucas and Aird, but there were delays with the West Highland Railway Mallaig Extension (Guarantee) bill for the Mallaig Extension Railway in the House of Commons as the Tory and Liberal parties fought over the issue of subsidies for public transport. This Act did pass in 1896, by which time Lucas and Aird (and their workers) had moved south. New contractors were needed and Robert McAlpine & Sons were taken on with Simpson & Wilson as engineers. Robert McAlpine & Sons was headed by Robert McAlpine, nicknamed "Concrete Bob" for his innovative use of mass concrete. Concrete was used due to the difficulty of working the hard schist in the area. McAlpine's son Robert, then aged 28, took charge of construction, with his younger son Malcolm appointed as assistant.

Construction of the extension from Fort William to Mallaig began in January 1897, and the line opened on 1 April 1901. The Glenfinnan Viaduct, however, was complete enough by October 1898 to be used to transport materials across the valley. It was built at a cost of £18,904.

A long-established legend attached to the Glenfinnan Viaduct was that a horse had fallen into one of the piers during construction in 1898 or 1899. In 1987, Professor Roland Paxton failed to find evidence of a horse at Glenfinnan using a borescope inserted into boreholes in the only two piers large enough to accommodate a horse. In 1997, on the basis of local hearsay, he investigated the Loch nan Uamh Viaduct by the same method but found the piers to be full of rubble. Using scanning technology in 2001, the remains of the horse and cart were found at Loch nan Uamh, within the large central pylon.

In 2024, following more than six years of planning, repair work on the structure began, with an expectation of the work completing in less than 12 months.

== Design ==
The viaduct is built from mass concrete, and has 21 semicircular spans of 50 feet (15 m). It is the longest concrete railway bridge in Scotland at 416 yards (380 m), and crosses the River Finnan at a height of 100 feet (30 m). The West Highland Line it carries is single track, and the viaduct is 18 feet (5.5 m) wide between the parapets. The viaduct is built on a curve of 792 feet (241 m).

The concrete used in the Glenfinnan Viaduct is mass concrete, which unlike reinforced concrete does not contain any metal reinforcement. It is formed by pouring concrete, typically using fine aggregate, into formwork, resulting in a material very strong in compression but weak in tension.

== Services ==
The West Highland Line connects Fort William and Mallaig, and was a crucial artery for the local fishing industry and the Highland economy in general, which suffered enormously after the Highland Clearances of the 1800s.

The line is used by passenger trains operated by ScotRail between Glasgow Queen Street and Mallaig, with Class 153 and Class 156 diesel multiple units. In the summer, West Coast Railways operates The Jacobite steam train along the line. It is a popular tourist event in the area, and the viaduct is one of the major attractions of the line. The Royal Scotsman also operates on the line.

== Depiction ==
The viaduct is commemorated on this Bank of Scotland £10 note.

The Glenfinnan Viaduct features on some Scottish banknotes. The 2007 series of notes issued by the Bank of Scotland depicts different bridges in Scotland as examples of Scottish engineering, and the £10 note features the Glenfinnan Viaduct.

The Glenfinnan Viaduct has attracted increased fame beyond Scotland as a filming location for the Harry Potter film series, featuring in four of the films. Thus, the viaduct is sometimes referred to as "The Harry Potter Bridge". The association has led to hundreds of thousands more tourists each year, a significant strain on the hamlet of Glenfinnan and its vicinity. After its appearance in Harry Potter, British Transport Police had to warn fans not to walk on the viaduct after a handful of close calls between pedestrians and trains had occurred.

== See also ==
- List of bridges in Scotland
