= Loch nan Uamh Viaduct =

Rail bridge in Scotland

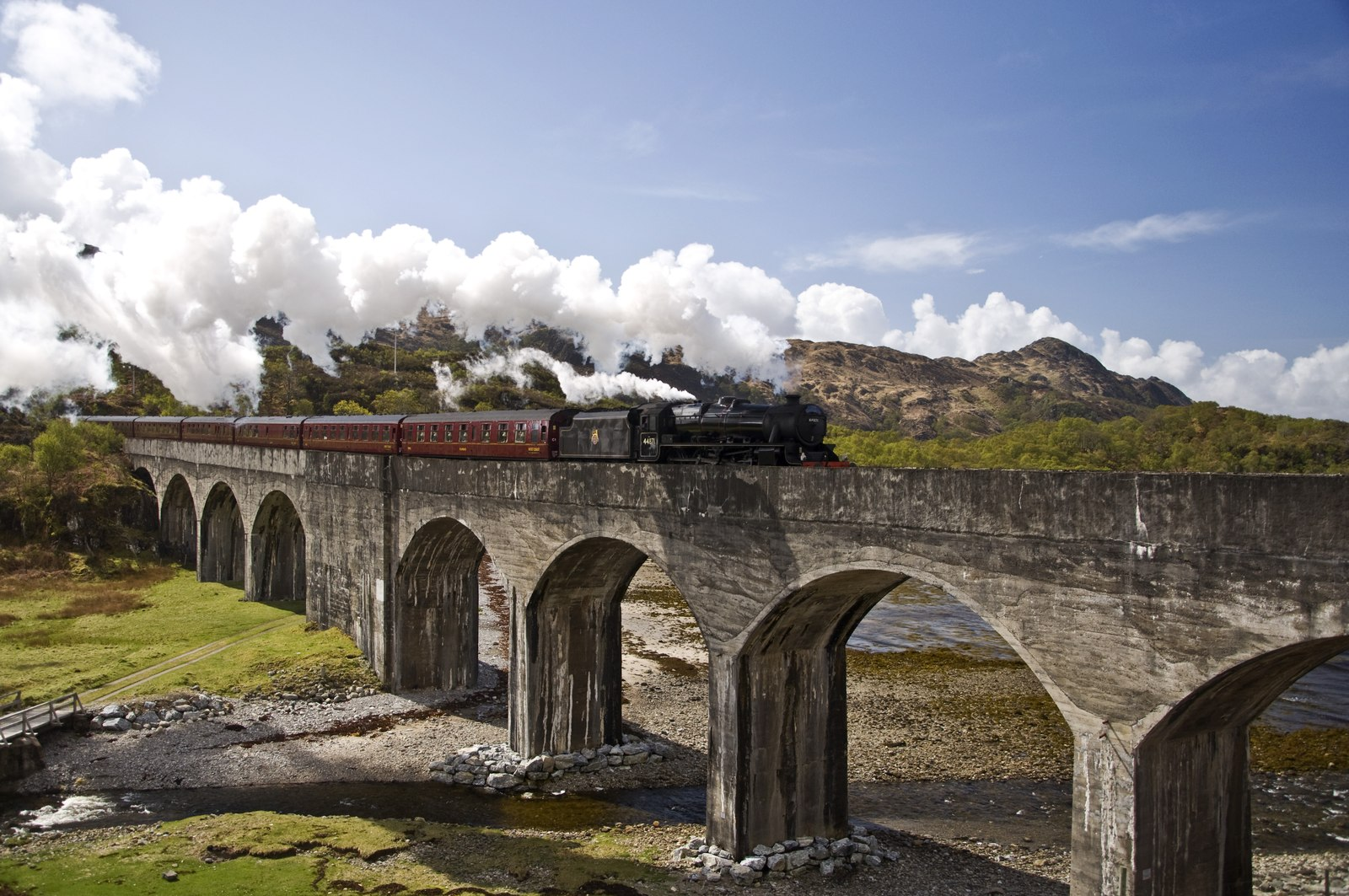
- The viaduct carrying The Jacobite
- Coordinates: 56.8923382°N 5.7306558°W
- Carries: West Highland Line
- Crosses: Allt a' Mhama

Characteristics
- Material: Concrete
- Longest span: 50 feet (15 m)
- No. of spans: 8

History
- Designer: Simpson & Wilson
- Construction start: 1897
- Opened: 1901

Listed Building – Category B
- Official name: Loch Nam Uamh Railway Viaduct Over Gleann Mama
- Designated: 4 October 1971
- Reference no.: LB295

Location
- Interactive map of Loch nan Uamh Viaduct

The Loch nan Uamh Viaduct is a railway viaduct in Scotland that carries the West Highland Line.

== History ==
The West Highland Railway was built to Fort William by Lucas and Aird, but there were delays with the West Highland Railway Mallaig Extension (Guarantee) bill for the Mallaig Extension Railway in the House of Commons as the Tory and Liberal parties fought over the issue of subsidies for public transport. This Act did pass in 1896, by which time Lucas and Aird (and their workers) had moved south. New contractors were needed and Robert McAlpine & Sons were taken on with Simpson & Wilson as engineers. Robert McAlpine & Sons was headed by Robert McAlpine, nicknamed "Concrete Bob" for his innovative use of mass concrete. Concrete was used due to the difficulty of working the hard schist in the area. McAlpine's son Robert, then aged 28, took charge of construction, with his younger son Malcolm appointed as assistant.

Construction of the extension from Fort William to Mallaig began in January 1897, and the line opened on 1 April 1901.

== Design ==
The viaduct has eight concrete arches of 50 feet (15 m) span, four each side of a large central concrete pylon. The reason for this design is not known.

The viaduct crosses the Allt a' Mhama, or Mama Burn, just before it flows into Loch nan Uamh, a sea loch to the north of the Ardnish peninsula.

Immediately to the north of the viaduct is a short tunnel.

== Entombed horse ==
In 1987 Roland Paxton, from Heriot-Watt University, investigated the legend that a horse had fallen into a pier during construction of Glenfinnan Viaduct in 1898 or 1899. However, after inserting a fisheye camera into boreholes made into the only two piers large enough to accommodate a horse, no animal remains were found. In 1997, on the basis of local hearsay, Paxton investigated Loch nan Uamh viaduct using the same method but found only rubble as well. In 2001, he returned to Loch nan Uamh with radar equipment and found the remains of a horse and cart within the viaduct's central pylon.

== See also ==
- List of bridges in Scotland
