= An Stac =

Mountain in Scotland

Coordinates: 56°51′20″N 05°40′12″W

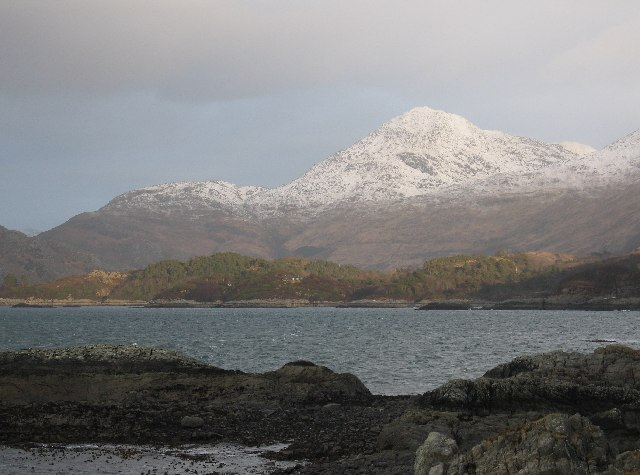
- An Stac from the mouth of Loch Ailort

Highest point
- Elevation: 814 m (2,671 ft)
- Prominence: 255 m (837 ft)
- Listing: Corbett, Marilyn

Geography
- Location: Lochaber, Scotland
- Parent range: Northwest Highlands
- OS grid: NM762792
- Topo map: OS Landranger 40

An Stac is the name of a 814 m mountain in the Northwest Highlands, Scotland, on the shore of Loch Ailort on the west coast of Lochaber. A steep-sided conical peak, the mountain is usually climbed in conjunction with its higher neighbour Rois-bheinn. The nearest settlement is the hamlet of Lochailort.
