= Loch Beag =

Cove on the west coast of Northern Scotland

Coordinates: 56.886°N 5.736°W

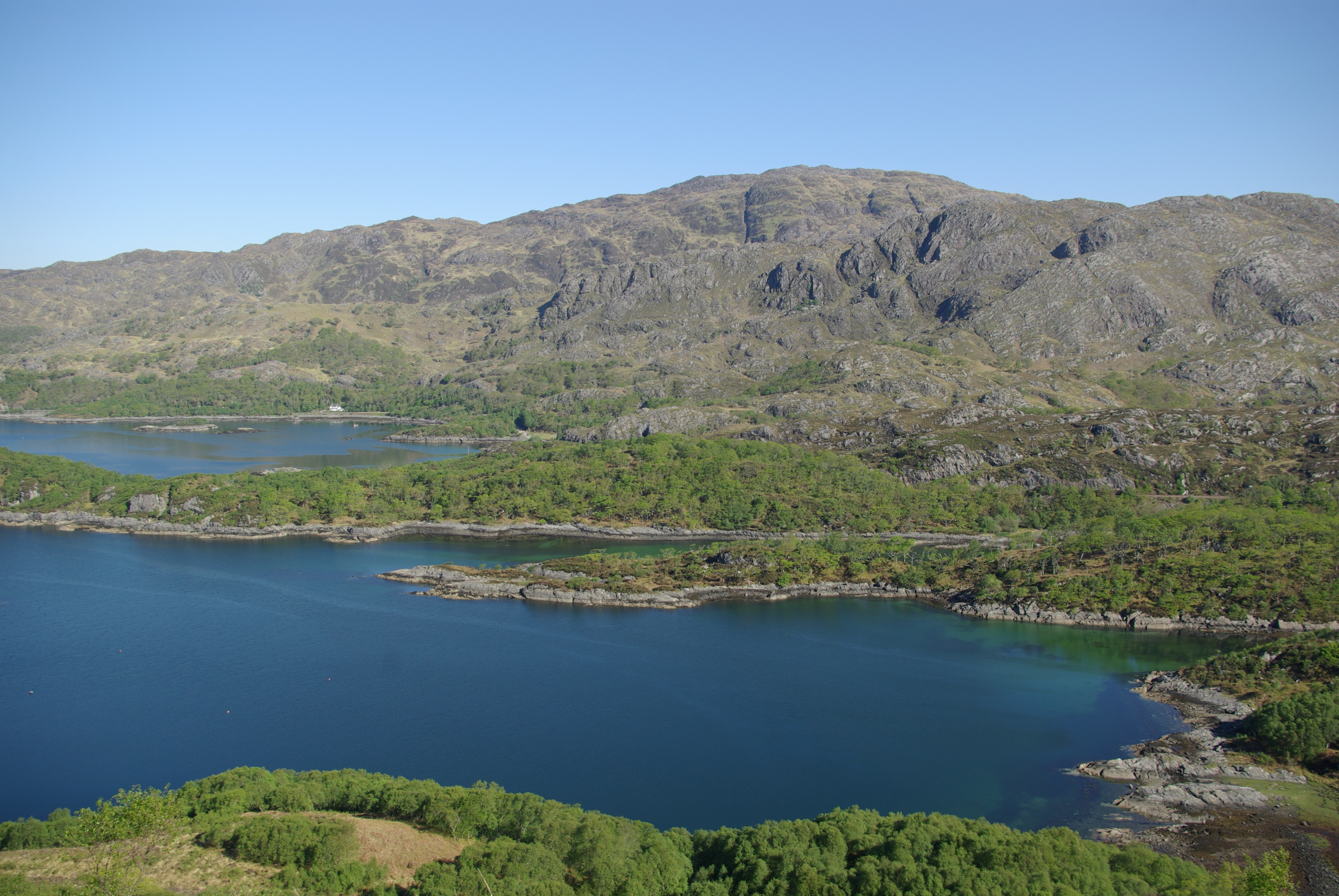
Looking north over Loch Beag

Loch Beag is a cove on the west coast of Northern Scotland, in the vicinity of the Sound of Arisaig. The eastern end of the Sound of Arisaig divides into Loch nan Uamh in the north and Loch Ailort in the south separated by a headland. Loch Beag is an inlet at the eastern end of Loch nan Uamh. It is 1.2 kilometres (0.75 mi) long and 0.5 kilometres (0.31 mi) wide, with a maximum depth of 21 metres (69 ft).

The area is extremely thinly populated, but the loch is used for a mussel fishery. Many eider ducks also live around this cove.

== Etymology ==
Beag is Scottish Gaelic for "small" and is the name of several small lochs around Scotland. Loch is cognate with English "lake", but in Scottish Gaelic is also applied to coastal sea inlets.
