= Arnabol Viaduct =

Bridge in Highland, Scotland

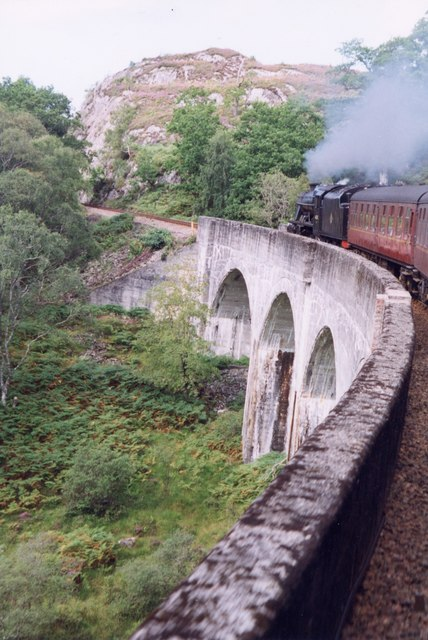
- Coordinates: 56.8884075°N 5.7139169°W
- Carries: West Highland Line
- Crosses: Arnabol Burn

Characteristics
- Material: Concrete
- No. of spans: 6

History
- Designer: Simpson & Wilson
- Construction start: 1897
- Opened: 1901

Listed Building – Category B
- Official name: Polnish, Arnabol Railway Viaduct Over Arnabol Burn
- Designated: 28 May 1985
- Reference no.: LB297

Location
- Interactive map of Arnabol Viaduct

The Arnabol Viaduct carries the West Highland Line over the Arnabol Burn.

== History ==
The West Highland Railway was built to Fort William by Lucas and Aird, but there were delays with the West Highland Railway Mallaig Extension (Guarantee) bill for the Mallaig Extension Railway in the House of Commons as the Tory and Liberal parties fought over the issue of subsidies for public transport. This Act did pass in 1896, by which time Lucas and Aird (and their workers) had moved south. New contractors were needed and Robert McAlpine & Sons were taken on with Simpson & Wilson as engineers. Robert McAlpine & Sons was headed by Robert McAlpine, nicknamed "Concrete Bob" for his innovative use of mass concrete. Concrete was used due to the difficulty of working the hard schist in the area. McAlpine's son Robert, then aged 28, took charge of construction, with his younger son Malcolm appointed as assistant.

Construction of the extension from Fort William to Mallaig began in January 1897, and the line opened on 1 April 1901.

== Design ==
The viaduct carries the single track line over the Arnabol Burn, and has a slight curve to the south. It has six concrete spans, each of 50 feet (15 m).

== See also ==
- List of bridges in Scotland
