= Prince's Cairn =

- Càrn Prionnsa
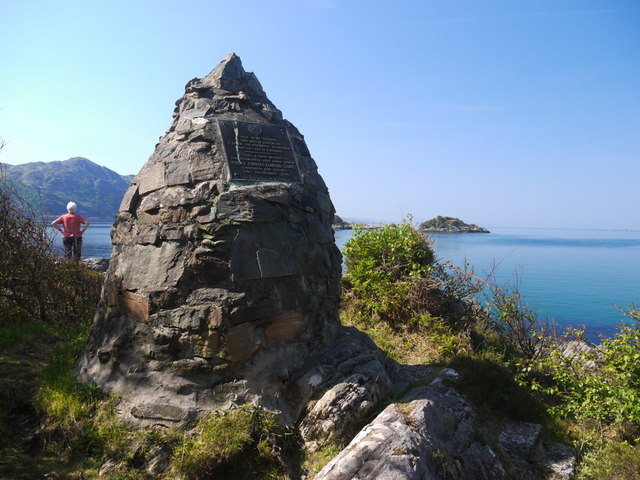
- The Prince's Cairn by the Loch nan Uamh

- Location within Scotland

General information
- Type: cairn
- Location: Beasdale
- Coordinates: 56.89495°N 5.74517°W
- Inaugurated: 4 October 1956
- Client: 1745 Association

Technical details
- Material: Stone

The Prince's Cairn marks the traditional spot from where Prince Charles Edward Stuart embarked for France from Scotland on 20 September 1746 following the failure of the Jacobite rising of 1745. The cairn is located on the shores of Loch nan Uamh in Lochaber. It was erected in 1956 by the 1745 Association, a historical society dedicated to the study, recording and preservation of memories from the Jacobite period.

Although the cairn commemorates the final departure of the Prince before his exile to France, Loch nan Uamh is also where the Young Pretender first stepped ashore on mainland Great Britain on 25 July 1745 and from where – in April 1746 – he escaped to the Hebrides after the defeat of his forces at the Battle of Culloden.

== Monument ==
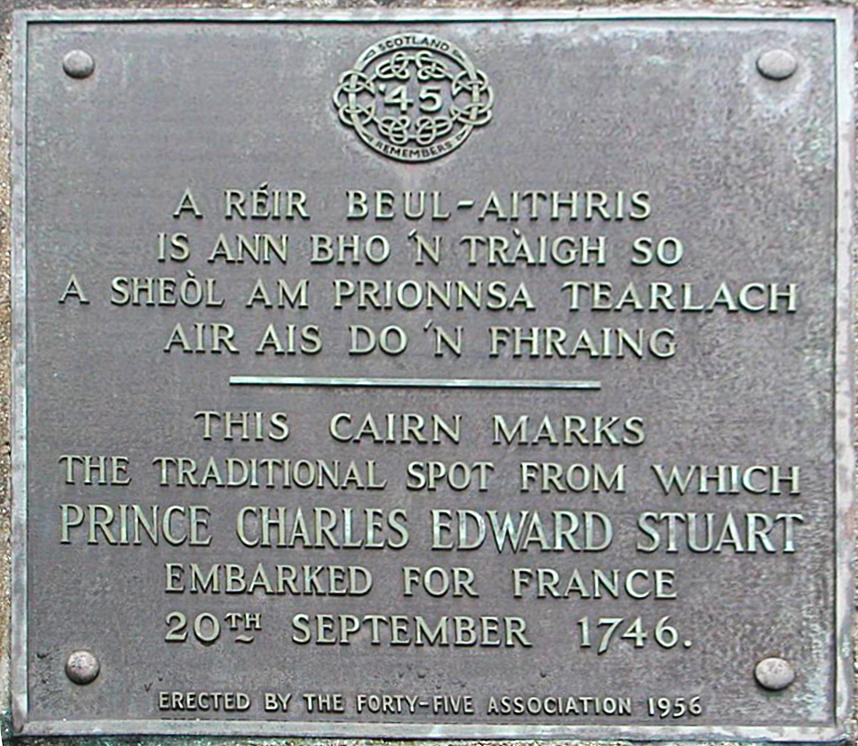
Inscription on the cairn

On the morning of 4 October 1956, the 1745 Association held a ceremony to unveil the cairn that marked the traditional spot where Bonnie Prince Charlie departed for France. More than 200 people gathered on the small promontory by the shores of the Loch to watch the event. The new cairn, the ancient Highland symbol of remembrance, had been erected through subscription. It was draped with the cross of Saint Andrew surrounded by the banners of the clans that supported the Jacobite cause.

The ceremony was led by Diana Hay, 23rd Countess of Erroll, Scotland's Lord High Constable, Sir Donald Hamish Cameron of Lochiel, 26th Chief of Clan Cameron, the laird of Inverailort, and descendants of the Cameron chieftains of Glendessary. It was noted that by coincidence the last time Scotland's hereditary Lord High Constable had been a woman it was during the Rising of 1745.

As the Countess unveiled the cairn, its builder John MacKinnon of Arisaig played a piobaireachd on bagpipes in salute. He was then joined by noted piper Angus MacPherson who played a traditional lament. MacPherson was a descendant of Cluny's piper, who hid with Charles Stuart and Cluny – the Clan chief – in the "Cage" on the slopes of Ben Alder near Ben Nevis.

The cairn is constructed from local stone. Its plaque has an inscription in both Gaelic and English, which reads:

A reir beul-aithris is ann bho 'n tràigh so an sheòl Am Prionnsa Tearlach air ais do 'n Fhraing.

This cairn marks the traditional spot from which Prince Charles Edward Stuart embarked for France.

20th September 1746.

The cairn, which stands on a small promontory, is adjacent to the A830 road (sometimes known as the Road to the Isles). Parking is available nearby in a large lay-by. The nearest railway station is Beasdale about 2.5 mi (4.0 km) to the west.

== Historical importance ==
=== Arrival in the Highlands ===
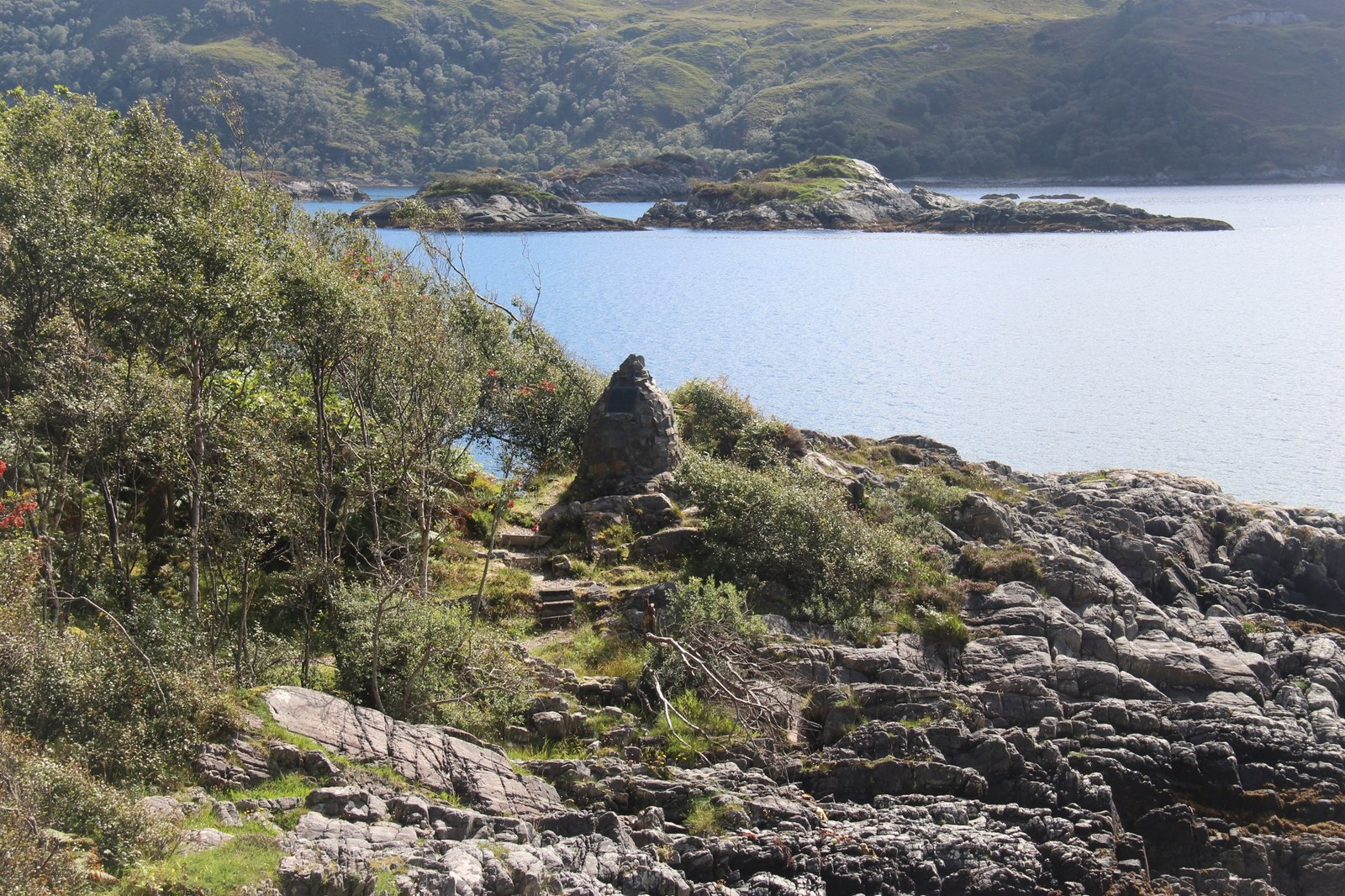
Prince’s Cairn and Eilean Ceann Fèidh

The 16-gun privateer Du Teillay (Note: The Du Teillay was commissioned by Antoine Walsh, who was an Irish shipowner and slave trader, operating in Nantes, France; whose family were exiled Jacobites.) (sometimes erroneously called Doutelle) landed Prince Charles and seven companions at Eriskay on 23 July 1745. After a night spent on the island, they returned to the Du Teillay the next morning. The ship then sailed to the Loch nan Uamh. This is where Charles Stuart first stepped ashore on mainland Britain. After staying at the Clanranald farm at Borrodale on Skye, he crossed the Sound of Arisaig to Moidart on Du Teillay on 29 July. In August he raised the Jacobite standard at Glenfinnan in the Scottish Highlands beginning the Rising of '45.

=== Flight from Culloden ===
On the evening of 26 April 1746 – ten days after his defeat at Culloden – Charles Stuart, Colonel John William O’Sullivan, Captain Felix O’Neil, Father Allan MacDonald, Donald MacLeod (The Faithful Palinurus), Ned Burke and several boatmen set out to sea from the shore of Loch nan Uamh for the Hebrides. However the weather was terrible and the boat soon began to fill with water. Even MacLeod who knew the seas well thought all was lost. The sailors prayed for deliverance, prompting the Prince to comment that while the clergyman who was with them ought to pray, the rest would be better employed bailing out the water. Next morning they struggled into a creek at Roisinis on the north-east point of Eriskay.

=== Exile to France ===
On 19 September 1746, (and after five months evading the government troops of Prince William, Duke of Cumberland), Charles Edward Stuart arrived from "Cluny's Cage", a refuge on Ben Alder, accompanied by Donald Cameron of Lochiel, the war poet John Roy Stewart, and others. Moored in Loch nan Uamh, they found L'Heureux, the French frigate that was to carry him to safety. Throughout 19 September the Jacobites that were to accompany the Prince into exile boarded the ships. The next day the vessels weighed anchor in Loch nan Uamh and sailed from Scotland. Charles Stuart, the Young Pretender, never set foot on Scottish soil again; he died in Rome in 1788.
