= Project Smok =

Scottish neotraditional folk band

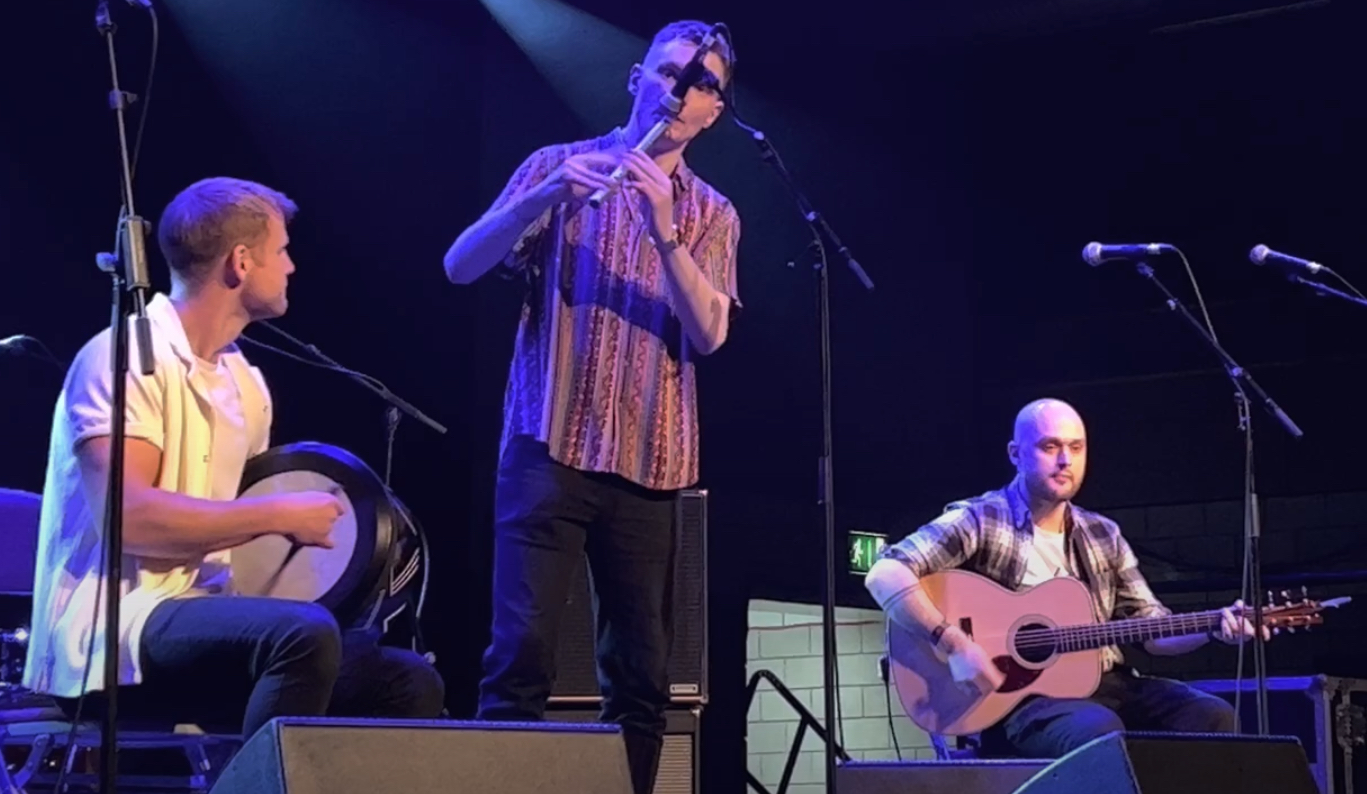
- Project Smok performing in 2023

Background information
- Genres: Scottish folk
- Years active: 2017–present
- Members: Ali Levack; Ewan Baird; Pablo Lafuente
- Website: projectsmok.com

Project Smok is a neotraditional Scottish folk band.

== History ==
The band was formed in 2017 by Levack and Lafuente, and brought on Baird in winter 2018.

== Musical style ==
Simon Thompson, reviewing their performance at the 2023 Edinburgh International Festival, described their style as "defiantly tuneful, relentlessly upbeat, and an utter joy".

Jim Gilchrist of The Scotsman, attending the same concert, noted their "blistering energy and impressively empathetic cohesion," with "Levack's low whistle playing all breathy swoops, overtones and rapid-fire ornamentation, over Lafuente and Baird’s tightly syncopated accompaniment." He felt, personally, that "tempering that relentlessly full-on musical muscle with more nuance would have been welcome," but acknowledged that the band had "delighted" festivalgoers.

Johnny Whalley, reviewing The Outset for Folk Radio UK, commented that the band has "developed a framework for their compositions that ensures the traditional and electronic instruments sit comfortably together, producing music that can alternately energise or calm the listener."

== Band members ==
- Ali Levack (pipes)
- Ewan Baird (bodhrán)
- Pablo Lafuente (guitar)

== Discography ==
- Horizons (EP, 2017)
- Bayview (2020)
- Esperanza (EP, 2021)
- The Outset (2024)
