= Glenfinnan Monument =

Statue in the Highlands of Scotland

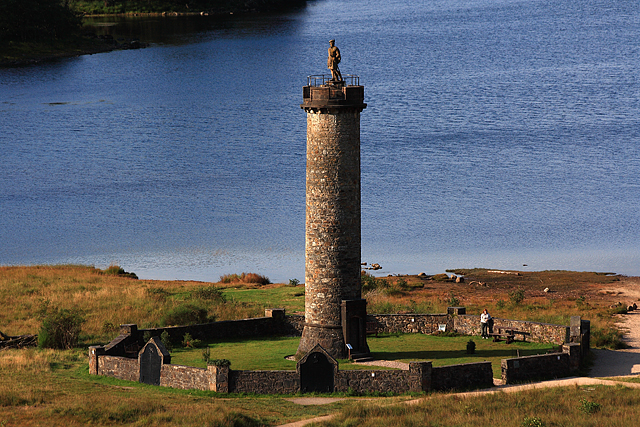
- The monument in 2008, looking southwest
- Interactive map of Glenfinnan Monument
- Location: Glenfinnan; Scotland
- Coordinates: 56°52′09″N 05°26′13″W
- Designer: James Gillespie Graham
- Type: Statue
- Material: Rubble
- Height: 69 ft (21 m)
- Opening date: 1814; 212 years ago

The Glenfinnan Monument is a Category A listed monument in Glenfinnan, Lochaber, erected in 1814 and dedicated to the Scottish Highlanders who fought in the Jacobite Army during the Jacobite rising of 1745.

== History ==
By 1814, Jacobitism was no longer a political threat to the House of Hanover. Alexander Macdonald, a member of Clan Macdonald of Clanranald, ordered the construction of the tower to commemorate the Highlanders who fought on the side of Charles Edward Stuart during the rebellion. Alexander's father had hosted Stuart for a night in 1745 on his travels. The tower, which is 59 ft (18 m) in height, was designed by Scottish architect James Gillespie Graham.

The monument's location at Glenfinnan was made possible by a new road (now the A830), built by Thomas Telford and opened in 1812, between Fort William and Arisaig. The tower's construction was funded partially by the wealth accrued from slave plantations in Jamaica owned by Macdonald's father, also named Alexander. A statue of an unknown Highlander designed by John Greenshields, referred to at the point of commission as Stuart himself, was added in 1835.

=== The monument today ===
Since 1938, the monument has been in the care of the National Trust for Scotland. The Trust has constructed a visitor centre, providing tickets, information, exhibitions, a shop, a café and toilets. In 2021, the Trust replaced a portrait of Stuart in the visitor centre with a display which detailed the links between the monument and slavery along with information on the ownership of slaves by Highland elites.

== Gallery ==
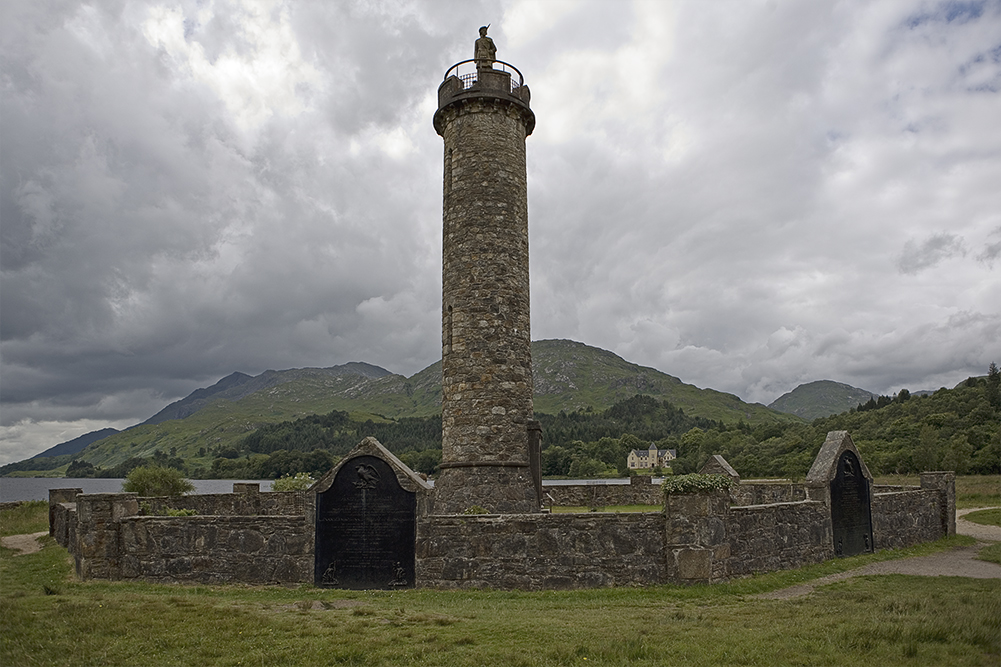
Ground view of the monument

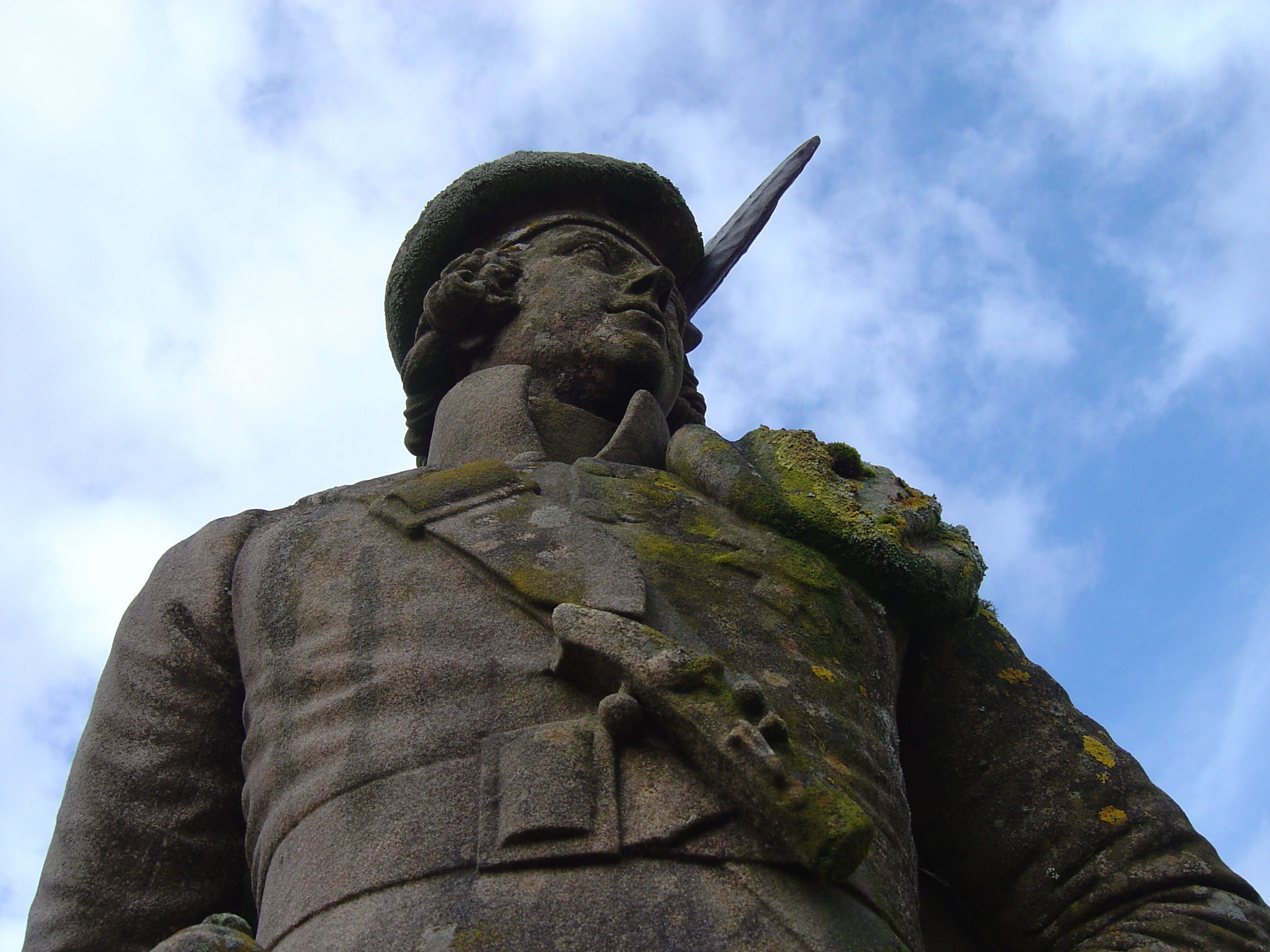
Close-up of the Unknown Highlander statue

== See also ==
- List of Category A listed buildings in Highland
