= Arisaig railway station =

Railway station in the Highlands of Scotland

Arisaig Scottish Gaelic: Àrasaig
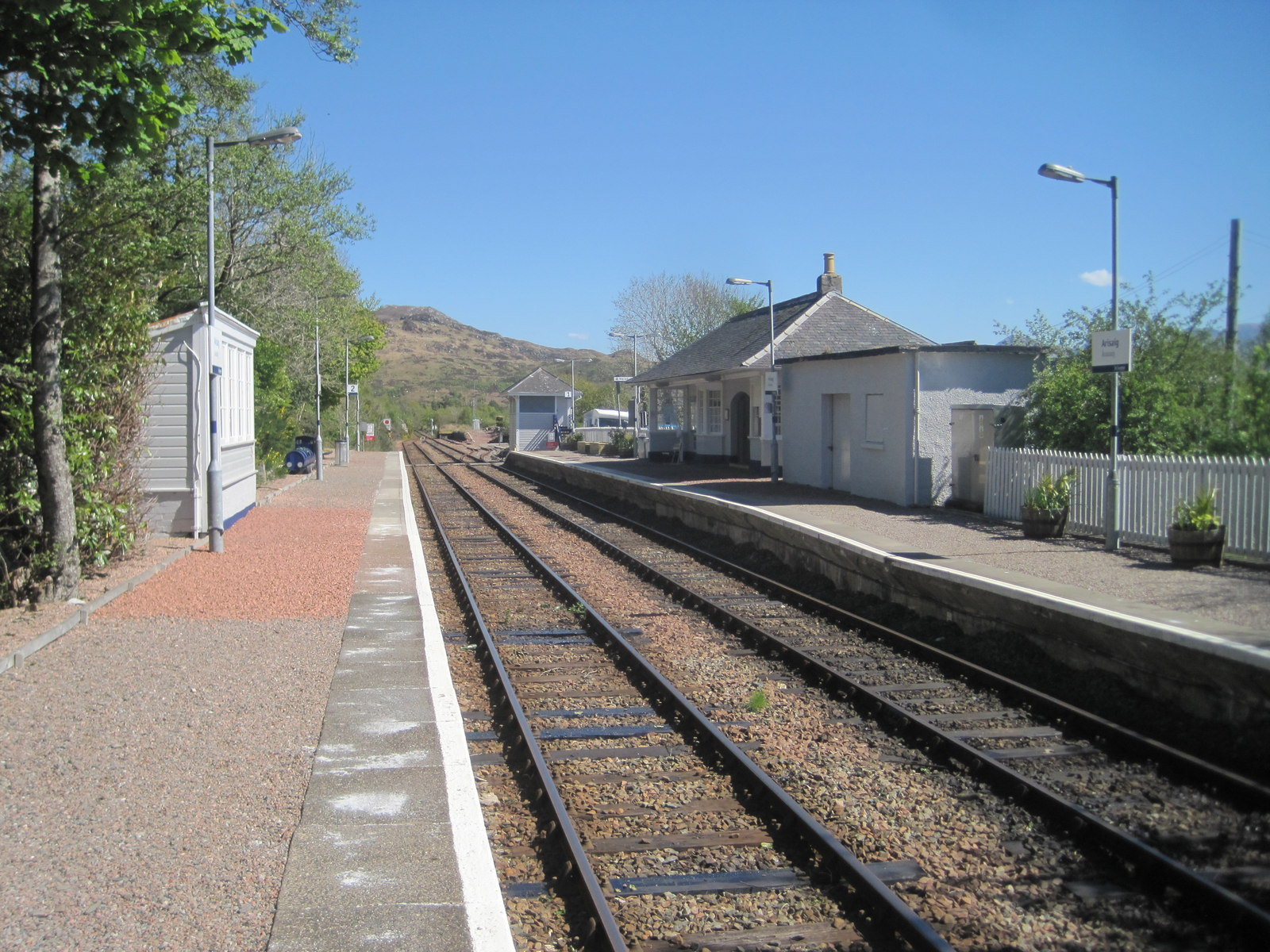

General information
- Location: Arisaig, Highland; Scotland
- Coordinates: 56.9130°N 5.8395°W
- Grid reference: NM663867
- Manager: ScotRail
- Platforms: 2

Other information
- Station code: ARG

History
- Original company: Mallaig Extension Railway of West Highland Railway
- Pre-grouping: North British Railway
- Post-grouping: LNER

Key dates
- 1 April 1901: Station opened

Passengers
- 2021/22: ▲3,802
- 2022/23: ▲4,196
- 2023/24: ▲6,078
- 2024/25: ▼5,572
- 2025/26: ▲5,620

Listed Building – Category B
- Designated: 29 May 1985
- Reference no.: LB326
Location
Notes
- Passenger statistics from the Office of Rail and Road

Arisaig railway station serves the village of Arisaig on the west coast of the Highland region of Scotland. This station is on the West Highland Line, measured 32 miles 2 chains (51.5 km) from the former Banavie Junction, near Fort William, between Beasdale and Morar on the way to Mallaig. The westernmost station on the Network Rail network, it is the only one of the four cardinal points of the national network that is not a terminus. ScotRail, who manage the station, operate all services.

== History ==
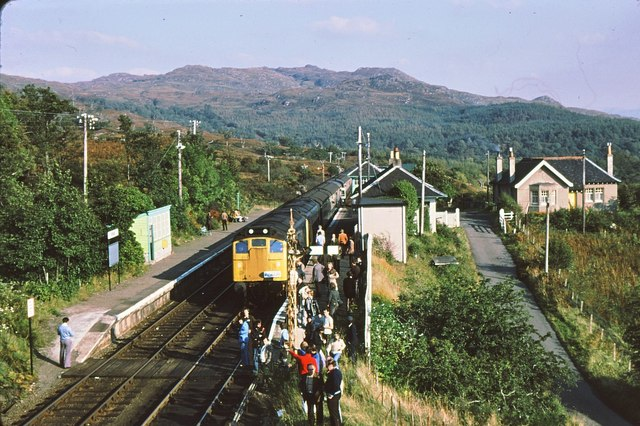
Arisaig in 1979

Arisaig station opened on 1 April 1901. The station was laid out with two platforms, one on either side of a crossing loop. There is a siding on the south side of the line, east of the Down platform.

Opened by the North British Railway, it became part of the London and North Eastern Railway during the Grouping of 1923, despite being the westernmost station in Great Britain. The station was host to a LNER camping coach from 1936 to 1939.

A camping coach was also positioned here by the Scottish Region from 1952 to 1960, the coach was replaced in 1961 by a Pullman camping coach which was joined by another Pullman in 1966. From 1967 to 1969 there were 2 standard camping coaches here, all camping coaches in the region were withdrawn at the end of the 1969 season.

== Facilities ==
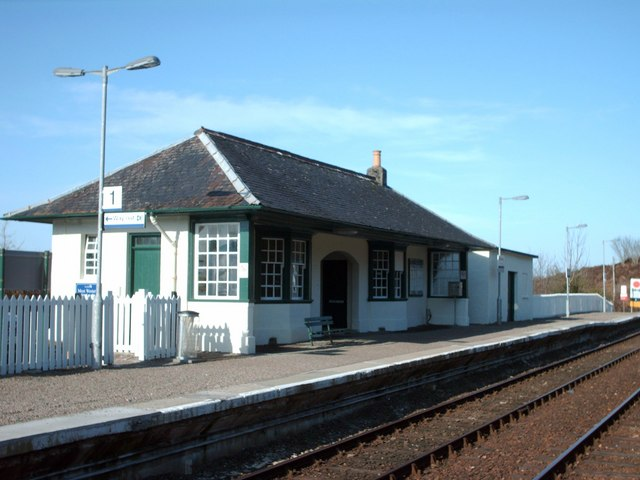
The old station building

Both platforms have benches, but only platform 2 has a specific waiting shelter (although platform 1 does have a help point). There is a car park next to platform 1, with step-free access to the platform. However, the only access to platform 2 is via one of two barrow crossings. As there are no facilities to purchase tickets, passengers must buy one in advance, or from the guard on the train.

== Passenger volume ==
Passenger Volume at Arisaig
	2004–05	2005–06	2006–07	2007–08	2008–09	2009–10	2010–11	2011–12	2012–13	2013–14	2014–15	2015–16	2016–17	2017–18	2018–19	2019–20	2020–21	2021–22	2022–23	2023–24	2024–25
Entries and exits	7,228	7,086	7,636	7,290	6,188	7,076	7,622	7,526	7,390	7,394	7,596	7,058	6,262	6,886	6,226	5,942	1,072	3,802	4,196	6,078	5,572

The statistics cover twelve month periods that start in April.

== Services ==
On weekdays and Saturdays, four trains a day call at Arisaig on the way to Mallaig or Fort William, and three of the latter go on further to Glasgow. The last eastbound train of the day connects into the overnight Caledonian Sleeper to Glasgow, Edinburgh Waverley and London Euston at Fort William on weekdays. Sunday services are less frequent, with three trains each way.

Preceding station	National Rail	Following station
Beasdale	ScotRail; West Highland Line	Morar
	Historical railways	
Beasdale; Line and Station open	North British Railway; Mallaig Extension Railway of West Highland Railway	Morar; Line and Station open

== Bibliography ==
- Brailsford, Martyn, ed. (December 2017) [1987]. Railway Track Diagrams 1: Scotland & Isle of Man (6th ed.). Frome: Trackmaps. ISBN 978-0-9549866-9-8.
- Butt, R. V. J. (October 1995). The Directory of Railway Stations: details every public and private passenger station, halt, platform and stopping place, past and present (1st ed.). Sparkford: Patrick Stephens Ltd. ISBN 978-1-85260-508-7. OCLC 60251199. OL 11956311M.
- McRae, Andrew (1997). British Railway Camping Coach Holidays: The 1930s & British Railways (London Midland Region). Vol. Scenes from the Past: 30 (Part One). Foxline. ISBN 1-870119-48-7.
- McRae, Andrew (1998). British Railways Camping Coach Holidays: A Tour of Britain in the 1950s and 1960s. Vol. Scenes from the Past: 30 (Part Two). Foxline. ISBN 1-870119-53-3.
- Jowett, Alan (March 1989). Jowett's Railway Atlas of Great Britain and Ireland: From Pre-Grouping to the Present Day (1st ed.). Sparkford: Patrick Stephens Ltd. ISBN 978-1-85260-086-0. OCLC 22311137.
- Jowett, Alan (2000). Jowett's Nationalised Railway Atlas (1st ed.). Penryn, Cornwall: Atlantic Transport Publishers. ISBN 978-0-906899-99-1. OCLC 228266687.
- Quick, Michael (2022). Railway Passenger Stations in Great Britain: A Chronology (PDF) (5th ed.). London: Railway and Canal Historical Society.
