= Arisaig =

Coastal village in Scotland

Coordinates: 56.910°N 5.843°W

Arisaig: Scottish Gaelic: Àrasaig
- Location within the Lochaber area
- Population: 300
- OS grid reference: NM661865
- Council area: Highland
- Country: Scotland
- Sovereign state: United Kingdom
- Post town: ARISAIG
- Postcode district: PH39
- Dialling code: 01687
- Police: Scotland
- Fire: Scottish
- Ambulance: Scottish
- UK Parliament: Inverness, Skye and West Ross-shire
- Scottish Parliament: Skye, Lochaber and Badenoch

Arisaig /ˈærɪseɪɡ/ (Scottish Gaelic: Àrasaig) is a village in Lochaber, Inverness-shire. It lies 7 miles (11 kilometres) south of Mallaig on the west coast of the Scottish Highlands, within the Rough Bounds. Arisaig is also the traditional name for part of the surrounding peninsula south of Loch Morar, extending east to Moidart. Etymologically, Arisaig means "safe bay". It lies in the Scottish council area of Highland and has a population of about 300.

== Prehistory ==
Realignment of a 6 km section of the A830 road in Arisaig led to archaeological investigations in 2000–2001 by the Centre for Field Archaeology (CFA), the University of Edinburgh, and Headland Archaeology Ltd, which found a Bronze Age kerb cairn, turf buildings and shieling huts. The shielings were repeatedly reused through the medieval and post-medieval periods, but themselves were on top of Bronze Age remains.

Analysis of peat cores has revealed a history of continuous, but gradual decline in woodland, starting in about 3200 BC and continuing to the present. The same analysis found that people were likely to have been in the area constantly from 2500 BC, but in low numbers. From 500 BC onwards the area underwent more intensive grazing activities.

Further improvements to the A830, led to excavations, again by CFA, in 2005 of a burnt mound, the first such feature to have been excavated in this part of the Highlands. The mound was radiocarbon dated to period from 2550 to 1900 BC, the early Bronze Age. The purpose of burnt mounds are unknown and they have been hypothesized to have been used as cooking places, saunas or breweries and, unfortunately, the Arisiag burnt mound did not provide an answer to the question of their purpose(s).

== History ==
=== Early history ===
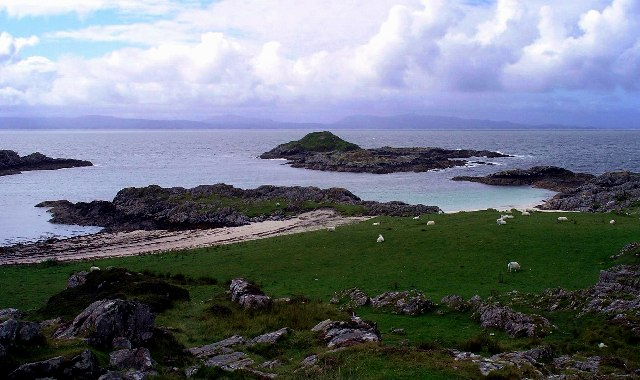
The Arisaig coast

After raids by Vikings that had begun in the 8th century AD, Arisaig became part of the Kingdom of the Isles, a Norwegian dependency. In the late 11th century, however, Malcolm III of Scotland came to a written agreement with Magnus Barelegs, the Norwegian king, to move the border to the coast, so that Arisaig became Scottish.

In the early 12th century, Somerled, a Norse-Gael of uncertain origin, became owner of Arisaig and the surrounding region. No reliable record explains how this happened, but by some point in the 1140s, David I of Scotland's control of the region had been eroded. In the middle of that century, Somerled launched a coup in the Kingdom of the Isles, which led to it joining his other possessions as a single state. On Somerled's death, Norwegian authority was restored, but in practice it remained divided; the part containing Arisaig was known as Garmoran and ruled by the MacRory, a faction among Somerled's heirs.

After the 1266 Treaty of Perth, Garmoran became a Scottish crown dependency – the Lordship of Garmoran – still ruled by the MacRory, until the final MacRory heir was Amy of Garmoran. Most of the remainder of the kingdom had become the Lordship of the Isles, ruled by the MacDonalds, whose leader, John of Islay, married Amy. After the birth of three sons, he divorced Amy and married the king's niece, in return for a substantial dowry. As part of the arrangement, John deprived his eldest son, Ranald, of the right to inherit the Lordship of the Isles, in favour of a son by his new wife. As compensation, he made Ranald the Lord of Garmoran.

However, Ranald's sons were still children at the end of the 14th century, and his younger brother Godfrey seized the Lordship of Garmoran in their stead. Furthermore, the heirs of Ranald's other brother Murdoch now made their own claim. This led to much violent conflict involving Godfrey's family (the Siol Gorrie) and those of his brothers, although this is not described in much detail in surviving records.

By 1427, King James I was frustrated with the general level of violence in the Highlands, together with an insurrection caused by his own cousin. He demanded that Highland magnates attend a meeting at Inverness. On arrival, many were seized and imprisoned. Alexander MacGorrie, son of Godfrey, was considered one of the two most reprehensible, and after a quick show trial immediately executed. Alexander had by then inherited Godfrey's de facto position as Lord of Garmoran, and in view of Ranald's heirs being no less responsible for the violence, King James declared the Lordship forfeit.

=== Lairdship grants ===
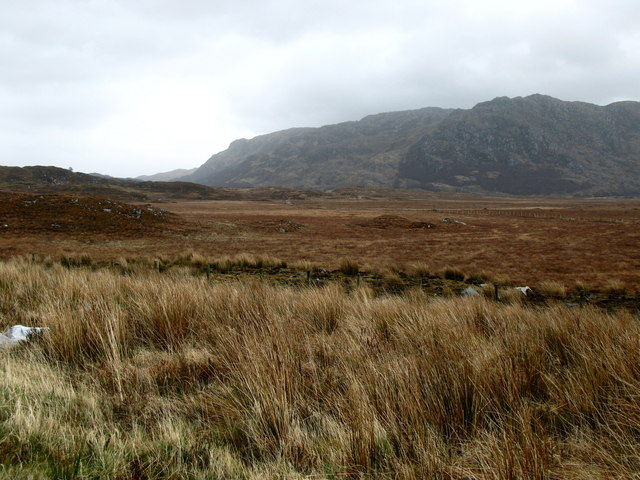
The plain of Mointeach Mhòr

In 1469, James' grandson (James III) granted Lairdship of the lands of Garmoran and Uist to John of Ross, the Lord of the Isles. In turn, John passed it to his half-brother, Hugh of Sleat; the grant to Hugh was confirmed by the king in a 1493 charter. The violence that led to Alexander's execution had brought the Siol Gorrie to the brink of extinction, and after Alexander's death they played no further part in Arisaig's history.

Ranald's heirs, Clan Ranald, disputed and fought against the charter. After Hugh of Sleat's death in 1498, and for reasons that are not remotely clear, his son John of Sleat immediately resigned, transferring all authority to the king. By this time John of Ross's conspiratorial ambition had caused the Lordship of the Isles to be forfeited, but in 1501, his heir, Black Donald, launched an insurrection aimed at restoring it. Ranald Bane, leader of Clan Ranald, was one of the few MacDonald-descended clan leaders to refuse to support Donald, and so in 1505, shortly before Donald was defeated, Ranald Bane was given the Lairdship of Arisaig and Eigg as a reward.

In 1520, the excessive cruelty of Ranald Bane's son, Dougall (not described in detail by surviving records) led to his assassination and the exclusion of Ranald Bane's descendants from leadership of Clan Ranald. Instead, Ranald Bane's brother, Alexander, took over the leadership. In 1532, the king provided a charter confirming Alexander's son, John Moidartach, as Laird of Arisaig and Eigg.

=== 17th - 18th centuries ===
On 15 June 1700, Bishop Thomas Nicholson of the illegal and underground Catholic Church in Scotland arrived at Keppoch in Arisaig and was personally received and with great courtesy by the Chief of Clan MacDonald of Clanranald, who placed a boat with experienced sailors at the bishop's disposal for his visits to the Hebrides.

In his Report of the Visitation, Bishop Nicholson later commented about the region, "Kilmarui, i.e. the Cell or Church of St. Maelrubber, is close to Keppoch in Arisaig. In this chapel there are several tombs of hard bluish stone, on which there are some ancient figures very well carved, but without inscription for the most part. One would not have thought that the people of these countries had as much skill in sculpture as these tombs show them to have had. There are some on which a priest, wearing the ancient form of chasuble, is engraved; others have only figures of arms, such as large swords, or else figures of birds and other animals. There are similar tombs on Eilean Finnan (where the Lairds of Moidart are buried), in Eigg, in Uist, Barra, and in several other islands off the North of Scotland."

On 20 September 1746 Bonnie Prince Charlie left Scotland for France from a place near the village after the collapse of the Jacobite rising of 1745. The site of his departure is marked by the Prince's Cairn at Loch nan Uamh, to the east of Arisaig.

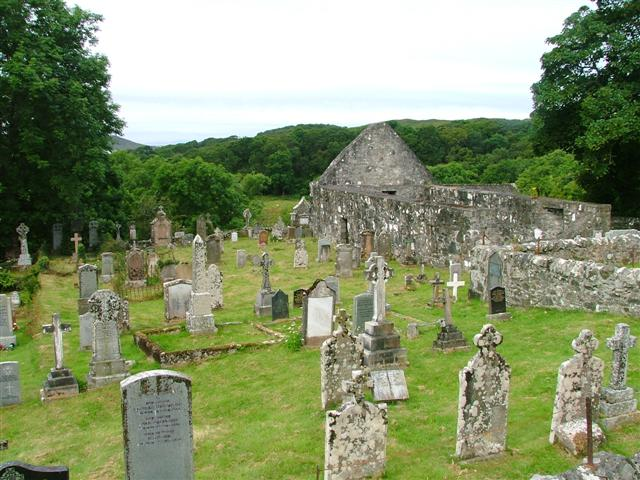
Alasdair Mac Mhaighstir Alasdair rests in an unknown plot in the cemetery beside the ruins of St. Maelrubha's Roman Catholic Church at Arisaig.

The Gaelic tutor to Prince Charles Edward Stuart, Alasdair Mac Mhaighstir Alasdair, died at Arisaig in 1770. A gale then raging along the coast prevented his body from being taken for burial beside his parents at Eilean Finnan in Loch Shiel, the Bard was instead buried beside the ruins of Kil-Mael-Rubha Church in Airsaig. Although the exact location of the Alasdair's grave is no longer known, a wall plaque was erected in 1927 in St. Maelrubha's Roman Catholic cemetery in Arisaig "by a few Jacobite admirers in New Zealand and some fellow clansmen at home, in recognition of his greatness as a Gaelic poet".

During the Highland Clearances, many of the local population emigrated to Canada, where in 1785 they founded the town of Arisaig, in Antigonish County, Nova Scotia. According to Dom Odo Blundell of Fort Augustus Abbey, the remaining population of Arisaig continued to be overwhelmingly Gaelic-speaking and belonged to the Catholic Church.

=== 19th century - present ===
Due to his financial extravagance, Ranald George, the 20th Chief of Clan Ranald sold almost all the traditional Clan properties, including Arisaig, in the 1820s.

Archaeological excavations of a croft by CFA Archaeology, during the realignment and upgrading works of the A830 in 2005, and historical research by Stirling University has found that the new landowner, Lord Cranstoun was the most notorious local Anglo-Scottish landlord for ordering the largest number of evictions in Arisaig during the Highland Potato Famine. Lord Cranstoun was certainly not a popular proprietor and was accused of having failed even to make effort to bring relief to his tenants, or even pay his own workers. It was even noted within a debate in the House of Commons in 1847, that Lord Cranstoun had 17 servants on the edge of starvation, who he refused to pay or provide for (see Distress in Scotland, HC Deb, 22 February 1847, vol 90, cc310 – 6). Ellice (1847, see previous reference), noted that the state of most families in Arisaig during the time, were on the brink of starvation and destitution. Lord Cranstoun, alongside other estate owners, were encouraged to offer road expansions or drain improvements on their estates, giving destitute families a chance to work, which he begrudgingly accepted, however, refused to provide tools for the job. The economic downturn and potato blight caused estate owners to focus their attention towards pasture lands for sheep and deer hunting grounds, predominantly for the very wealthy, causing many people to be evicted or emigrate, with the unoccupied houses falling into ruin in and around Arisaig.

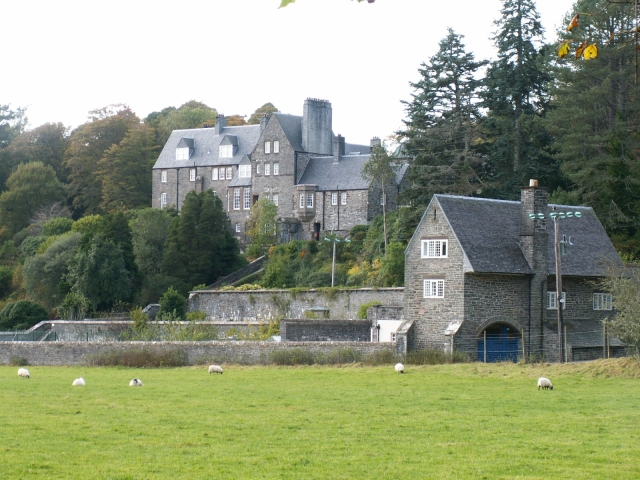
Arisaig House

Arisaig House, the only Scottish country house designed by architect Philip Webb (1831–1915), was built in 1863 for Francis Dukinfield Palmer-Astley (1825–1868) on the south side of the A830 Lochailort-Morar Road, 3.5 kilometres (2 1/4 mi) south-east of Arisaig, on the north shores of Loch Nan Uamh. The house was largely destroyed by fire in 1935 and remodelled in 1937 for Charlotte Gertrude Astley-Nicholson (died 1961).

During the Second World War, Arisaig House became the headquarters for the Scottish section of the Special Operations Executive, which ran paramilitary training courses to prepare field agents for missions in Occupied Europe. A number of smaller training centres were set up in the vicinity, for specialist work. The remote and challenging landscape of the Rough Bounds made it an ideal site for this. On 11 November 2009 a memorial to the Czechoslovak SOE field agents who trained locally in 1943–1945 was unveiled in Arisaig.

== Famous residents ==
- Alasdair Mac Mhaighstir Alasdair (c. 1698–1770), the leading war poet of the Jacobite rising of 1745 and teacher of Scottish Gaelic to Prince Charles Edward Stuart, died while serving as tacksman of Arisaig in 1770 and was buried in the cemetery of St. Máel Ruba, close to the present Catholic church of Arisaig. The Clanranald Bard, as he is sometimes called, remains one of the most important writers in the history of Scottish Gaelic literature.

== Amenities and attractions ==
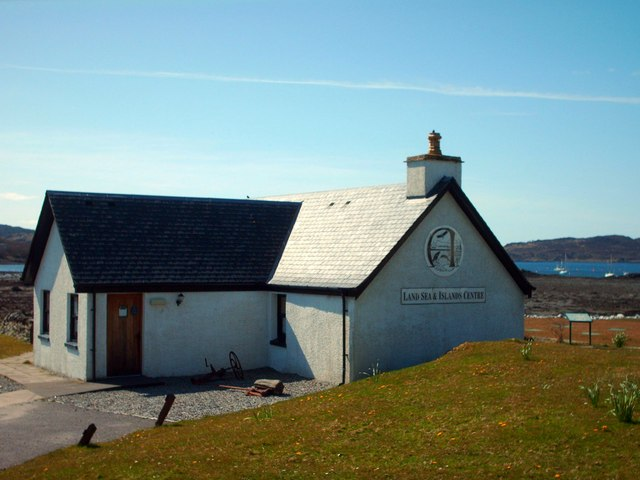
The Land, Sea and Island Centre

Arisaig has a post office, a general store, a restaurant, a café, a hotel with a bar, and a marina.

Tourism is the main industry in the area. The Land, Sea and Islands Centre offers a display on the connection between the Special Operations Executive and Arisaig. There is a local golf course, Traigh golf course and a local sea kayak center.

== Transport ==
Arisaig lies on the A830 to Mallaig to the north and Fort William to the east. It is also known as the Road to the Isles. Work on widening it into a double-lane road was completed in 2008. The village is also connected to Mallaig, Fort William and Glasgow by the West Highland Line. Arisaig railway station is the most westerly on the British mainland.

A small passenger ferry sails from Arisaig to the Small Isles of Eigg, Muck and Rùm. The main CalMac service to the Small Isles operates from Mallaig.

== In popular culture ==
Several areas of England have Arisaig as a street name, such as Ouston, County Durham. A fictionalized Ardnish peninsula and Arisaig provide the setting for most of the "Ian and Sovra" series of children's novels by Elinor Lyon.

Arisaig is the title of a song by popular Scottish neo-trad band Project Smok. It features as the third track on their 2020 debut LP, Bayview.

Arisaig also features in Robert Laing's folk song The Isle of Eigg, a song which has been covered by other Scottish bands such as McCalmans and Hó-Ró. The song is a love story set in Arisaig, its surroundings and on the Silver Shore, a reference to one of the beautiful sandy beaches of the area and the views across the water to the Isle of Eigg. "I met my love in Arisaig, where rhododendrons grow".
