= Loch Ailort =

Sea loch in the Highlands of Scotland

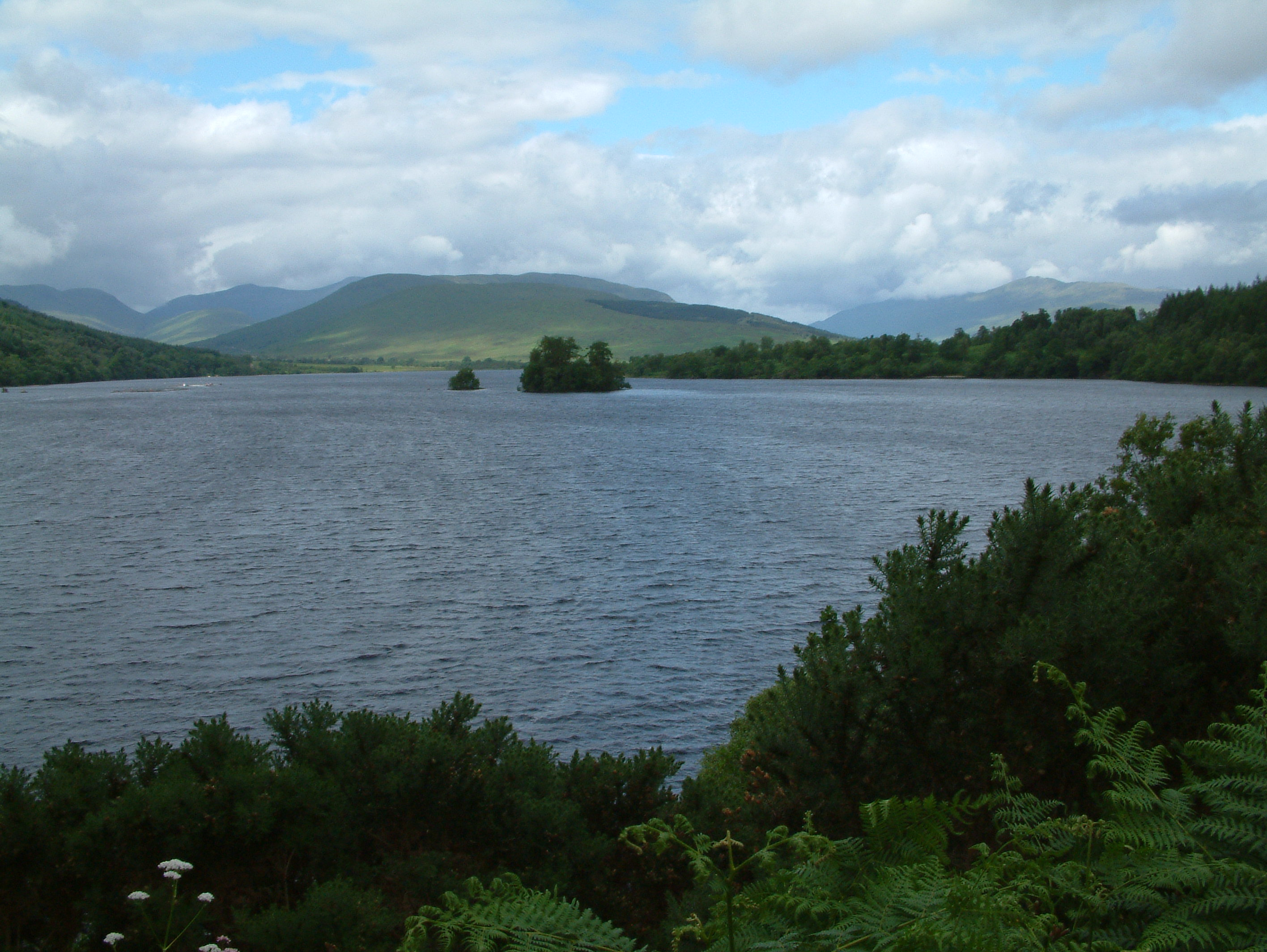
- Loch Ailort overlooking Ardnish peninsula.

- Location within Scotland
- Location: Lochailort, Lochaber, Highland
- Coordinates: 56°51′36″N 5°42′40″W
- Primary inflows: River Ailort
- Basin countries: Scotland
- Max. length: 8.1 km (5.0 mi)
- Surface area: 26.7 km^{2} (10.3 sq mi)
- Average depth: 87.27 ft (26.60 m)
- Max. depth: 141 ft (43 m)

Loch Ailort (/lɒx ˈaɪlərt/ lokh EYE-lərt; Scottish Gaelic: Loch Ailleart) is a sea loch in Morar, Lochaber, Highland, Scotland. Loch Ailort is a shallow, V-shaped loch, with the small Ardnish Peninsula on the north side, and the large, southwest-facing Moidart Peninsula to the south. Loch Ailort is bounded in the northeast by the settlement of the same name, Lochailort and in the west, opening out into the Sound of Arisaig. To the north of the loch lies Loch nan Uamh.

== Geography ==
The northern coastline is overlooked by the hill Cruach an Aonaich, that is situated at the centre of the V shape of the loch, and the ridge of An t Aonach which follows the coastline northeast to the edge of the loch, where the ridge flattens out to sea level. The southern coastline is dominated by the fine, cone-shaped former volcano of An Stac, which is a Corbett and overlooks Lochailort to the north. Further behind An Stac to south, and overlooking the great expanse of the sea loch, is the west-facing ridge that is made up of the Sgurr na Ba Glaise in the east followed by Rois-bheinn and Cruach Doir'an Raoigh, which are also, all Corbetts.

== Islands ==
Loch Ailort has a number of islands. At the entrance to the loch is two islands. Eilean nan Gobhar, or Eilean na Gour at the south of the loch mouth, and the other is Eilean á Chaolis. Eilean nan Gobhar, is famous for two vitrified forts. Further to the west lies the island of Eilean Buidhe, which lies at the centre of the channel and marks the point the sea loch turns northeast, for the upswing of the V shape. Further northeast, and visible from the village of Lochailort is the small mid channel island grouping of Eilean Dubh.

== Settlements ==
Loch Ailort is remote and its coastline is only sparsely populated. At the head of the loch lies the hamlet of Lochailort. To the north, the Ardnish peninsula is mostly empty, apart from the occasional farmhouse or hunting lodge. The southern coastline contains Alisary in the east and Roshven in the west. Further west, lying outside the mouth of the sea loch, lies the hamlet of Glenuig
