= Mass concrete =

Mass concrete is defined by American Concrete Institute Committee 207 as "any volume of concrete with dimensions large enough to require that measures be taken to cope with the generation of heat from the hydration of cement and attendant volume change to minimize cracking."

As the interior temperature of mass concrete rises due to the process of cement hydration, the outer concrete may be cooling and contracting. If the temperature differs too much within the structure, the material can crack. The main factors influencing temperature variation in the mass concrete structure are: the size of the structure, the ambient temperature, the initial temperature of the concrete at the time of placement and curing program, the cement type, and the cement contents in the mix.

Mass concrete structures include massive mat foundations, dams, and other concrete structures with a width or depth exceeding three feet or one meter.

== History ==
Historically, in Britain, mass concrete designated early concrete with no reinforcement cast in situ using shuttering. It was used mainly between 1850 and 1900 on a variety of buildings, mainly as a walling material or where mass was required for gravity such as in dams, reservoirs, retaining walls and maritime structures. In those days, the term was not officially defined and did not contain any connotation to large dimensions generating heat from hydration of cement, as these occurrences were not yet understood.
