= Sound of Arisaig =

Coordinates: 56.850°N 5.849°W

The Sound of Arisaig Lochaber, Scotland, separates the Arisaig peninsula to the north from the Moidart peninsula to the south. At the eastern, landward end, the sound is divided by Ardnish into two sea lochs. Loch nan Uamh lies to the north of Ardnish, Loch Ailort to the south. There are a number of small islands in the sound, of which Eilean nan Gobhar and Samalaman Island, both near to Glenuig on the south shore, are the largest.

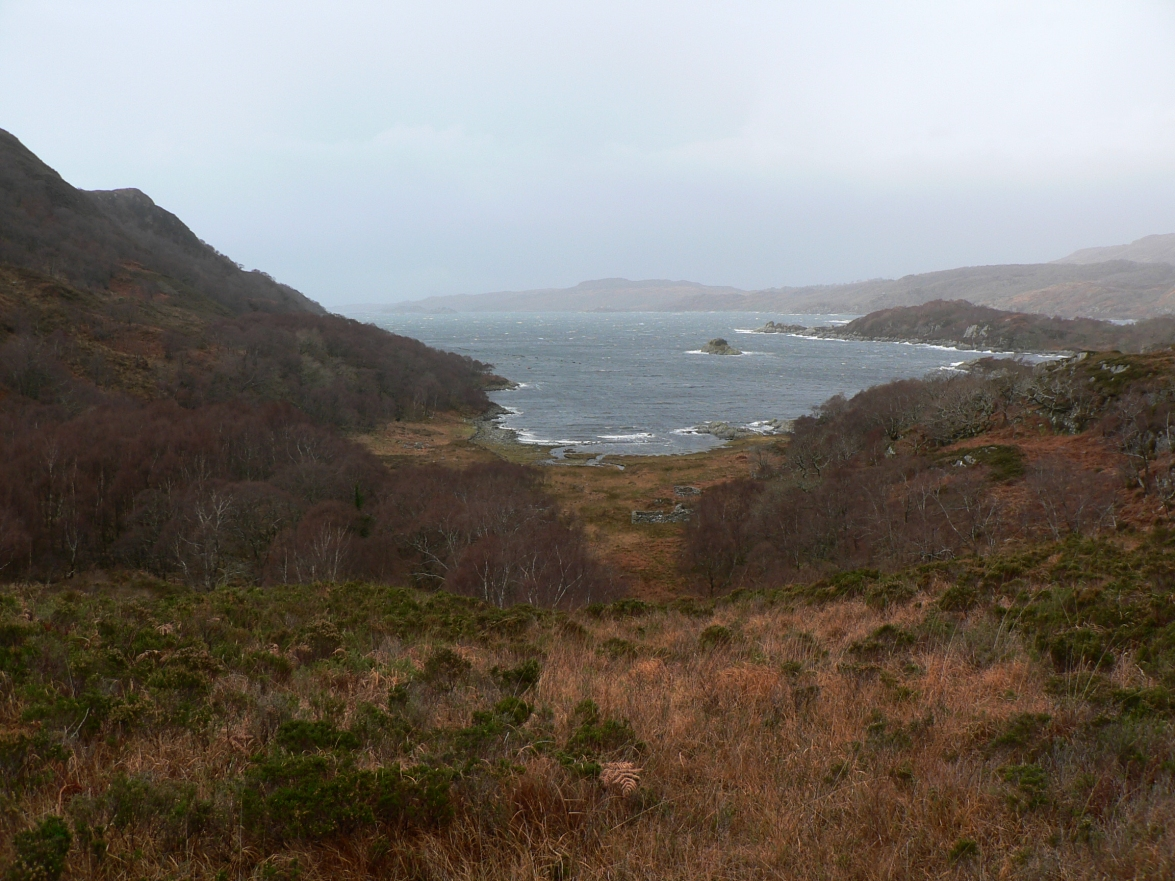
Loch nan Uamh from below Polnish

The A830 road, called the Road to the Isles, runs along the east end of Loch Ailort, and then crosses Ardnish before turning westwards along the north shore of Loch nan Uamh and the sound proper. The West Highland Line follows the same route including the Loch nan Uamh Viaduct. The A861 road follows the south shore of Loch Ailort and the sound proper as far west as Glenuig.

The Prince's Cairn, marking the spot where Bonnie Prince Charlie finally left Scotland after the unsuccessful Jacobite rising of 1745, on 20 September 1746, overlooks Loch nan Uamh.

The sound is a marine Special Area of Conservation.

== Literary allusion ==
Arisaig, Ardnish and the Sound inspired venues in the "Ian and Sovra" series of children's novels by Elinor Lyon, according to a letter of 24 June 2005 depicted on her page.

== See also ==
- Loch Beag, Inverness-shire
- Loch nan Uamh Viaduct
- Skirmish of Loch nan Uamh
