= 1905 in the United Kingdom =

Events from the year 1905 in the United Kingdom.

== Incumbents ==
- Monarch – Edward VII
- Prime Minister - Arthur Balfour (Coalition) (until 5 December), Henry Campbell-Bannerman (Liberal) (starting 5 December)

== Events ==
- 1 January – East Coast gales: Great Yarmouth flooded and pier at Scarborough washed away.
- 5 January – The play The Scarlet Pimpernel opens at the New Theatre in London and begins a run of 122 performances and numerous revivals.
- 16 February – At Haulbowline Base in Ireland, two explosions on board submarine HMS A5, due to petrol fumes after refuelling, kill six of the eleven crew.
- 23 February – Beginning of Eliza Sheffield's unsuccessful breach of promise case against Lord Townshend.
- February – Alf Common becomes the first £1,000 footballer in his transfer from Sheffield United to Middlesbrough.
- 10 March
  - An underground explosion at Cambrian Colliery in Clydach Vale kills 33.
  - Chelsea Football Club founded.
- 14 March – 23 of the 26 crew of the barque Kyber die when the ship is wrecked at Gwennap Head in Cornwall.
- 20 March – The title Prime Minister of the United Kingdom is officially recognised by Edward VII by a royal warrant.
- 29 March – Carmaker Vauxhall opens a factory at Luton, Bedfordshire, as its main manufacturing base following expansion from London.
- 6 May – The Naval, Shipping and Fisheries Exhibition opens in Earl's Court to mark 100 years since the Battle of Trafalgar
- 12 May
  - First public protest by suffragettes, led by Emmeline Pankhurst, at Westminster.
  - The Natural History Museum, London, unveils its popular exhibit of "Dippy", an exact replica of the skeleton of the Diplodocus carnegii dinosaur.
- 23 May – First performance of George Bernard Shaw's 1903 play Man and Superman, at the Royal Court Theatre, London.
- 29 May – The recently formed Chelsea F.C. are elected to the Football League for the 1905–06 football season; on 2 September they play their first match, at the new Stamford Bridge stadium (which the existing Fulham F.C. have declined to become tenants of).
- June – Cadbury Dairy Milk chocolate bar first produced, in Bournville.
- 1 June – General Post Office London to Brighton horse-drawn parcel post coach makes its last run, being replaced by a motor lorry the following day.
- 9 June – Charlton Athletic F.C. is founded.
- 15 June – Princess Margaret of Connaught marries Gustaf, Crown Prince of Sweden.
- 29 June – The Automobile Association inaugurated.
- July – British Red Cross Society formally inaugurated.
- 3 July – Release of Cecil Hepworth's short silent drama film Rescued by Rover presenting a significant advance in film techniques.
- 11 July – National Colliery disaster at Wattstown in the Rhondda: an underground explosion kills 120, with just one survivor.
- 2 August – The Ancient Order of Druids initiates neo-Druidic rituals at Stonehenge in England.
- 11 August – Aliens Act 1905, the first modern legislation to control immigration into the U.K.
- 12 August – First running of the Shelsley Walsh Speed Hill Climb, the world's oldest motorsport event to have been staged continuously on its original course
- 25 August – 'Ancient Order of Druids' initiate neo-druidic rituals at Stonehenge.
- 26 September – Newbury Racecourse first used.
- 3 October – HMS Dreadnought is laid down at Portsmouth, revolutionising battleship design and triggering an international naval arms race.
- 13 October – Annie Kenney and Christabel Pankhurst interrupt a Liberal Party rally at the Free Trade Hall in Manchester and choose imprisonment when convicted, the first militant action of the suffragette campaign.
- 18 October – London County Council's new street at Kingsway and redevelopment of Aldwych are opened.
- 21 October – Henry Wood first conducts a performance of his Fantasia on British Sea Songs at a centenary Trafalgar Day concert in London.
- 26 October – Aspirin sold in the UK for the first time.
- 5 November – Edward VII declares his eldest daughter The Princess Louise, Duchess of Fife, the Princess Royal. He also orders that the daughters of Princess Louise, Lady Alexandra Duff and Lady Maud Duff are to be styled as Princesses of the United Kingdom of Great Britain and Ireland with the style Highness.
- 19 November – 39 men die in a fire at a model lodging house in Watson Street, Glasgow.
- 28 November – Irish nationalist Arthur Griffith founds Sinn Féin in Dublin as a political party whose goal is independence for all of Ireland.
- 4 December – Internal splits within the Conservative Party over tariff reform lead to the resignation of Balfour as Prime Minister. Campbell-Bannerman takes over for the Liberal Party, pending a general election in the new year.
- 6 December – "Jacky" Fisher promoted to Admiral of the Fleet.
- 1905
  - Suicide rate of 303 per million, all-time UK peak year.
  - Local authority expenditure reaches an all-time peak as a proportion of all government expenditure of 51%.

== Publications ==
- E. Clerihew Bentley's first published collection of clerihews Biography for Beginners, illustrated by G. K. Chesterton.
- Angela Brazil's first novel A Terrible Tomboy.
- Arthur Conan Doyle's anthology The Return of Sherlock Holmes.
- E. M. Forster's novel Where Angels Fear to Tread.
- Robert Hichens' novel The Garden of Allah.
- W. J. Locke's novel The Morals of Marcus Ordeyne.
- H. E. Marshall's Our Island Story: A Child's History of England.
- E. Nesbit's children's novel The Railway Children (serialisation).
- Baroness Orczy's historical novel The Scarlet Pimpernel.
- H. A. Vachell's school story The Hill.
- H. G. Wells' novel Kipps.

== Births ==
- 2 January – Michael Tippett, composer (died 1998)
- 6 January – Idris Davies, Anglo-Welsh poet (died 1953)
- 14 January – Jane Welsh, actress (died 2001)
- 15 January – Torin Thatcher, actor (died 1981)
- 1 February – Joan Morgan, actress (died 2004)
- 4 February – Hylda Baker, comic actress (died 1986)
- 7 February – Cyril Demarne, firefighter and author (died 2007)
- 10 February – Rachel Thomas, actress (died 1995)
- 16 February – Oliver Franks, public figure (died 1992)
- 18 February – Queenie Leonard, actress (died 2002)
- 21 February – Henry Mollison, actor (died 1985)
- 26 February
  - Arthur Brough, actor (died 1978)
  - Robert Byron, travel writer (died 1941)
  - Kathleen Guthrie, graphic artist (died 1981)
- 1 March – Doris Hare, actress (died 2000)
- 2 March – Geoffrey Grigson, poet and literary critic (died 1985)
- 9 March – Peter Quennell, historian (died 1993)
- 10 March – Richard Haydn, comic actor (died 1985)
- 18 March – Robert Donat, actor (died 1958)
- 26 March – Geoffrey Gorer, anthropologist and author (died 1985)
- 28 March – Audrey Withers, magazine editor (died 2001)
- 30 March – Albert Pierrepoint, hangman (died 1992)
- 3 May – Sebastian Shaw, actor (died 1994)
- 16 May – H. E. Bates, fiction writer (died 1974)
- 22 May – Tom Driberg, journalist ("William Hickey") and politician (died 1976)
- 27 June – Lady Rachel Pepys, Lady-in-Waiting to Princess Marina, Duchess of Kent (died 1992)
- 4 July – Robert Hankey, 2nd Baron Hankey, diplomat (died 1996)
- 8 July – Kathleen Hamilton, Duchess of Abercorn, courtier (died 1990)
- 12 July – Prince John (died 1919)
- 17 July – Marjorie Reeves, historian and educationalist (died 2003)
- 25 July – Denys Watkins-Pitchford, writer (died 1990)
- 15 August – Lady Jean Rankin, courtier (died 2001)
- 23 August – Constant Lambert, composer (died 1951)
- 4 September – Mary Renault, novelist (died 1983)
- 22 September – Muriel Box, film director and screenwriter (died 1991)
- 29 September – Marie Hartley, writer (died 2006)
- 30 September – Michael Powell, filmmaker (died 1990)
- 4 October – Leslie Mitchell, announcer (died 1985)
- 15 October – C. P. Snow, novelist and physicist (died 1980)
- 29 October
  - Reg Bunn, comic book artist (died 1971)
  - Henry Green, novelist (died 1973)
  - Berthold Wolpe, calligrapher, typographer and illustrator (died 1989)
- 31 October – Elizabeth Jenkins, novelist (died 2010)
- 4 November – Frank Owen, journalist and politician (died 1979)
- 21 November – Georgina Battiscombe, biographer (died 2006)
- 25 November – Patrick Devlin, judge (died 1992)
- 26 November – Emlyn Williams, dramatist and actor (died 1987)
- 4 December – Guy Mountfort, advertising executive and ornithologist (died 2003)
- 5 December – Frank Pakenham, 7th Earl of Longford, peer, politician and reformer (died 2001)
- 21 December – Anthony Powell, novelist (died 2000)
- 22 December – Hugh Edward Richardson, diplomat and Tibetologist (died 2000)
- 25 December – Lewis Allen, film and television director (died 2000)
- 31 December – Jule Styne, songwriter (died 1994 in the United States)

== Deaths ==
- 9 April – Frederic Thesiger, 2nd Baron Chelmsford, British general (born 1827)
- 5 May – Edwin Bibby, wrestler (born 1848)
- 3 June – Hudson Taylor, British missionary (born 1832)
- 25 July – Thomas Spencer, joint founder of retailer Marks & Spencer (born 1851)
- 14 August – Simeon Solomon, artist (born 1840)
- 18 September – George MacDonald, Scottish author and poet, Christian minister (born 1824)
- 19 September – Thomas John Barnardo, philanthropist (born 1845)
- 13 October – Sir Henry Irving, stage actor (born 1838)
- 14 October – John Thomas, Welsh photographer (born 1838)
- 6 November – George Williams, founder of the YMCA (born 1821)
- 10 November – Rowland Williams (Hwfa Môn), poet and archdruid (born 1823)
- 14 November – Robert Whitehead, marine engineer (born 1823)
- 5 December – Henry Eckford, British horticulturist (born 1823)
- 9 December – Sir Richard Claverhouse Jebb, British scholar and politician (born 1841)
- 17 December – Robert Jones Derfel, poet and dramatist (born 1824)

== See also ==
- List of British films before 1920
