= Henry de Bohun =

English knight

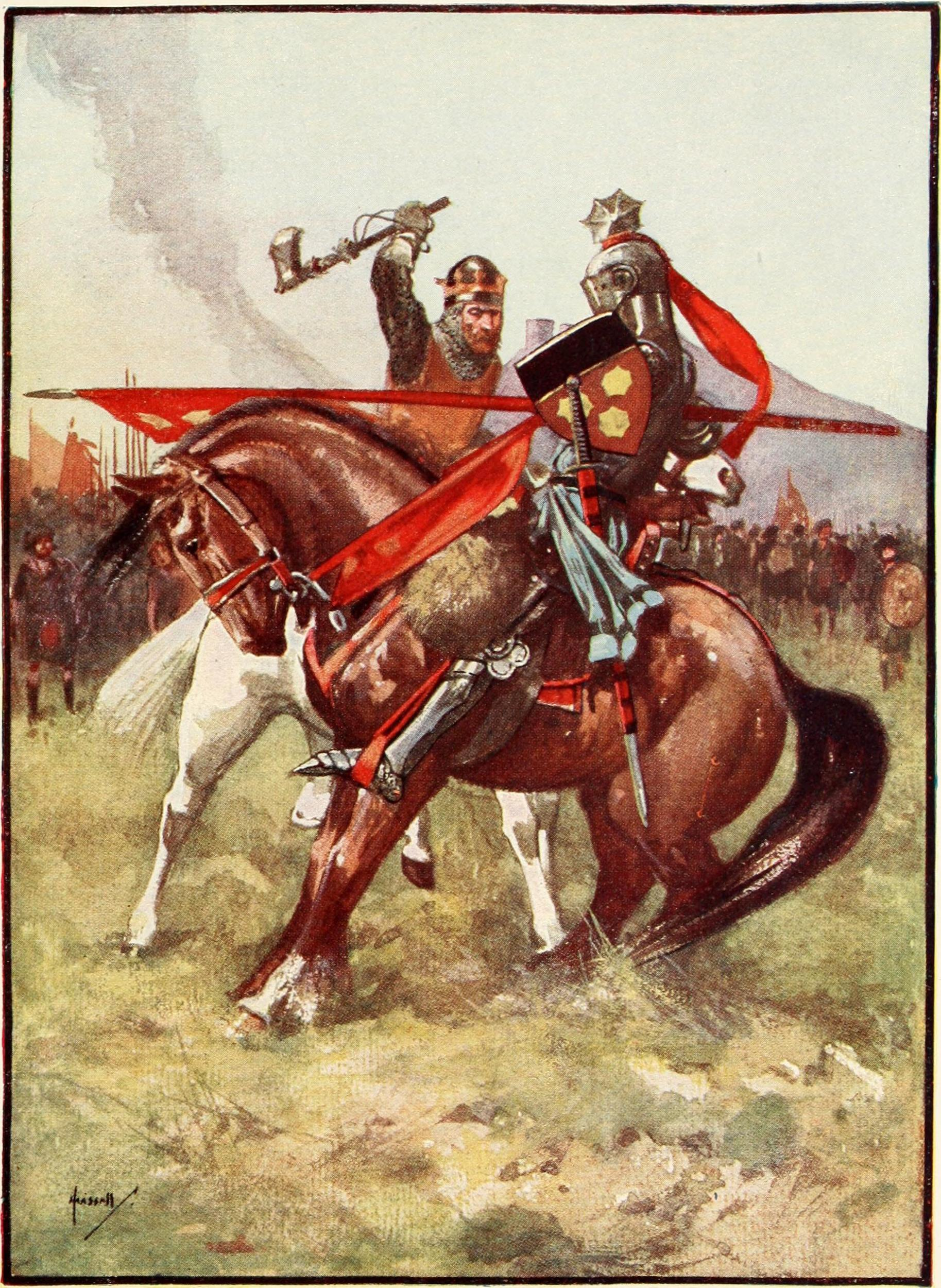
Robert the Bruce and Sir Henry at the Battle of Bannockburn

Sir Henry de Bohun (died 23 June 1314) was an English knight of Anglo-Norman origins and grandson of Humphrey de Bohun, 2nd Earl of Hereford. He was killed on the first day of the Battle of Bannockburn by Robert the Bruce.

Riding in the vanguard of heavy cavalry, Sir Henry caught sight of the Scottish King who was mounted on a small palfrey, lightly armoured and armed only with a battle-axe.

Sir Henry lowered his lance and charged, but Bruce stood his ground, riding on towards the English knight. The two men sped towards each other. At the last moment Bruce manoeuvred his mount nimbly to one side, stood up in his stirrups and hit Sir Henry so hard with his axe that it cut through both Sir Henry's helmet and skull and into his brain. Following the engagement, King Robert reportedly expressed only sadness at having broken the handle on his axe.

An iconic description and picture of the death of Sir Henry de Bohun is contained in Scotland's Story (1906) by H. E. Marshall.
