= Derfel =

Derfel (Welsh pronunciation: [ˈdɛrvɛl]) may refer to:

- Saint Derfel, 6th century British monk and reputed follower of King Arthur
  - Derfel Cadarn, fictionalized version of the above
- Robert Jones Derfel, Welsh poet and political writer
- Derfel, an Alsatian surname and a Welsh first name.

== See also ==
- Derf, people with the given name
- Derfel Limestone, a geologic formation in Wales
