= Jacobite rising of 1745 =

Attempt by the House of Stuart to regain the British throne

- Part of Jacobite risings
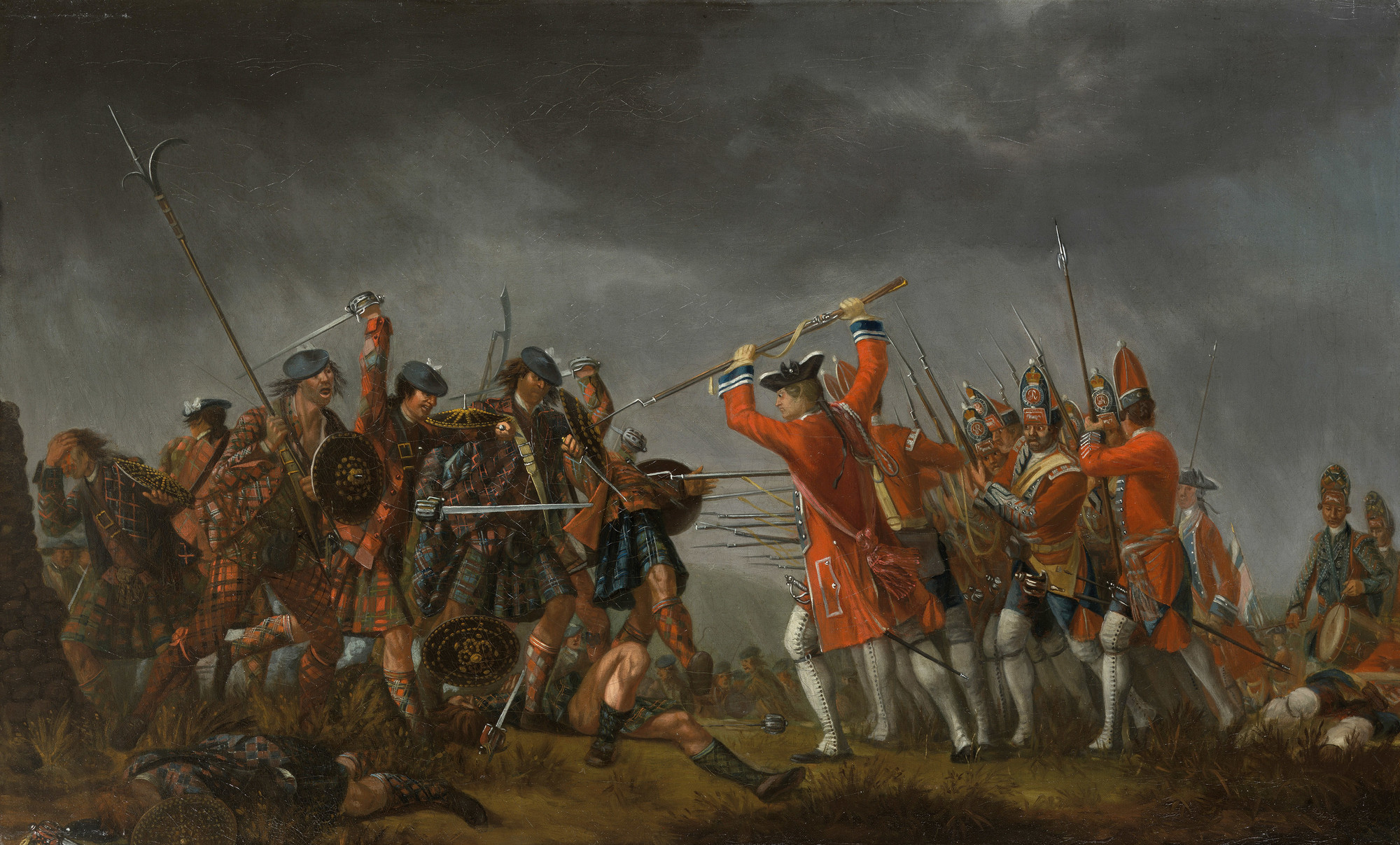
- An Incident in the Rebellion of 1745 by David Morier
Date	19 August 1745 – 20 April 1746
Location	Scotland and Northern England
Result	Government victory

Belligerents
(Kingdom of Great Britain) British Government	Jacobites

Commanders and leaders
Duke of Cumberland; John Cope; Henry Hawley; George Wade; Duncan Forbes	Charles Stuart; George Murray; John O'Sullivan; John Drummond; James Drummond

The Jacobite rising of 1745 (Note: Also known as the Forty-five Rebellion, or Scottish Gaelic: Bliadhna Theàrlaich, [ˈpliən̪ˠə ˈhjaːrˠl̪ˠɪç], lit. 'The Year of Charles')) was an attempt to regain the British throne for the exiled House of Stuart. The last in a series of Jacobite risings that began in March 1689, it proved to be the end of Jacobitism as a major factor in British politics.

The uprising was formally launched by Charles Edward Stuart on 19 August 1745 at Glenfinnan in the Scottish Highlands, with the rebels capturing Edinburgh and winning the Battle of Prestonpans in September. In early November, the largely Scottish Jacobite army invaded England, expecting to be joined by English sympathisers and a French landing in Southern England. This failed to materialise, and after reaching Derby on 4 December, their leaders voted in favour of retreat.

Although supported by the vast majority of the Scots who formed Charles' army, the decision caused an irretrievable split within the Jacobite senior command. Despite winning a narrow victory at Falkirk Muir in January 1746, defeat at Culloden in April ended the rebellion. Charles escaped to France, but was unable to win support for another attempt, and died in Rome in 1788.

== Background ==
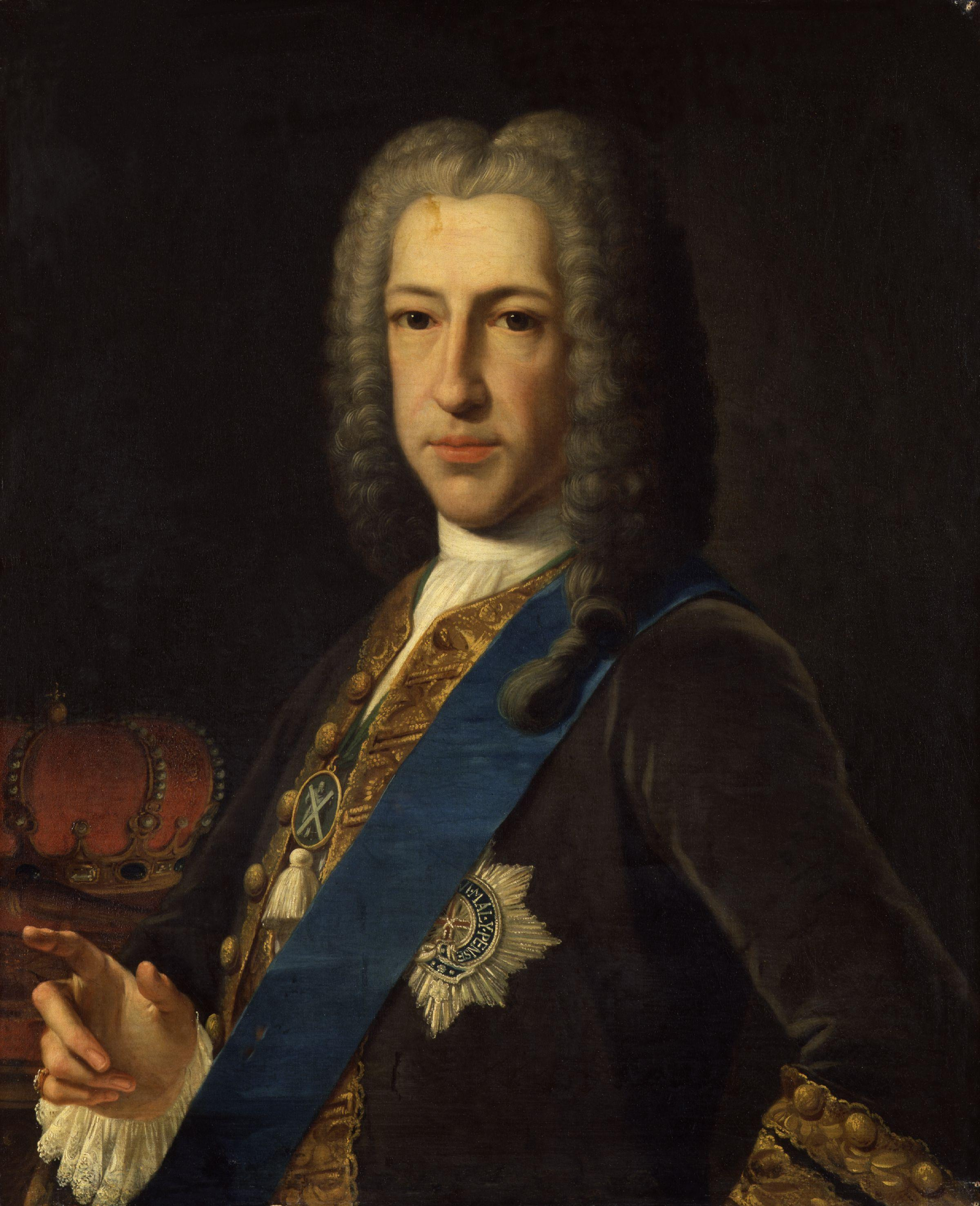
James Francis Edward Stuart, the 'Old Pretender', or 'Chevalier de St George' portrait from 1748

The 1688 Glorious Revolution replaced the Catholic James II & VII with his Protestant daughter Mary and her Dutch husband William, who ruled as joint monarchs of England, Ireland, and Scotland. Neither Mary, who died in 1694, nor her sister Anne, had surviving children, leaving their Catholic half-brother James Francis Edward Stuart as the closest natural heir. Since the Act of Settlement 1701 excluded Catholics from the succession, when Anne became queen in 1702, her heir was the distantly related but Protestant Electress Sophia of Hanover. Sophia died in June 1714, two months before Anne, and her son succeeded as George I in August.

Louis XIV of France, the primary source of support for the exiled Stuarts, died in 1715 and his successors needed peace with Britain in order to rebuild their economy. The 1716 Anglo-French alliance forced James to leave France; he settled in Rome on a Papal pension, making him even less attractive to the Protestants who formed the vast majority of his British support. Jacobite rebellions in 1715 and 1719 both failed, the latter so badly its planners concluded that it might "ruin the King's Interest and faithful subjects in these parts". Senior exiles like Henry St John, 1st Viscount Bolingbroke accepted pardons and returned home or took employment elsewhere. The birth of his sons Charles and Henry helped maintain public interest in the Stuarts, but by 1737, James was "living tranquilly in Rome, having abandoned all hope of a restoration."

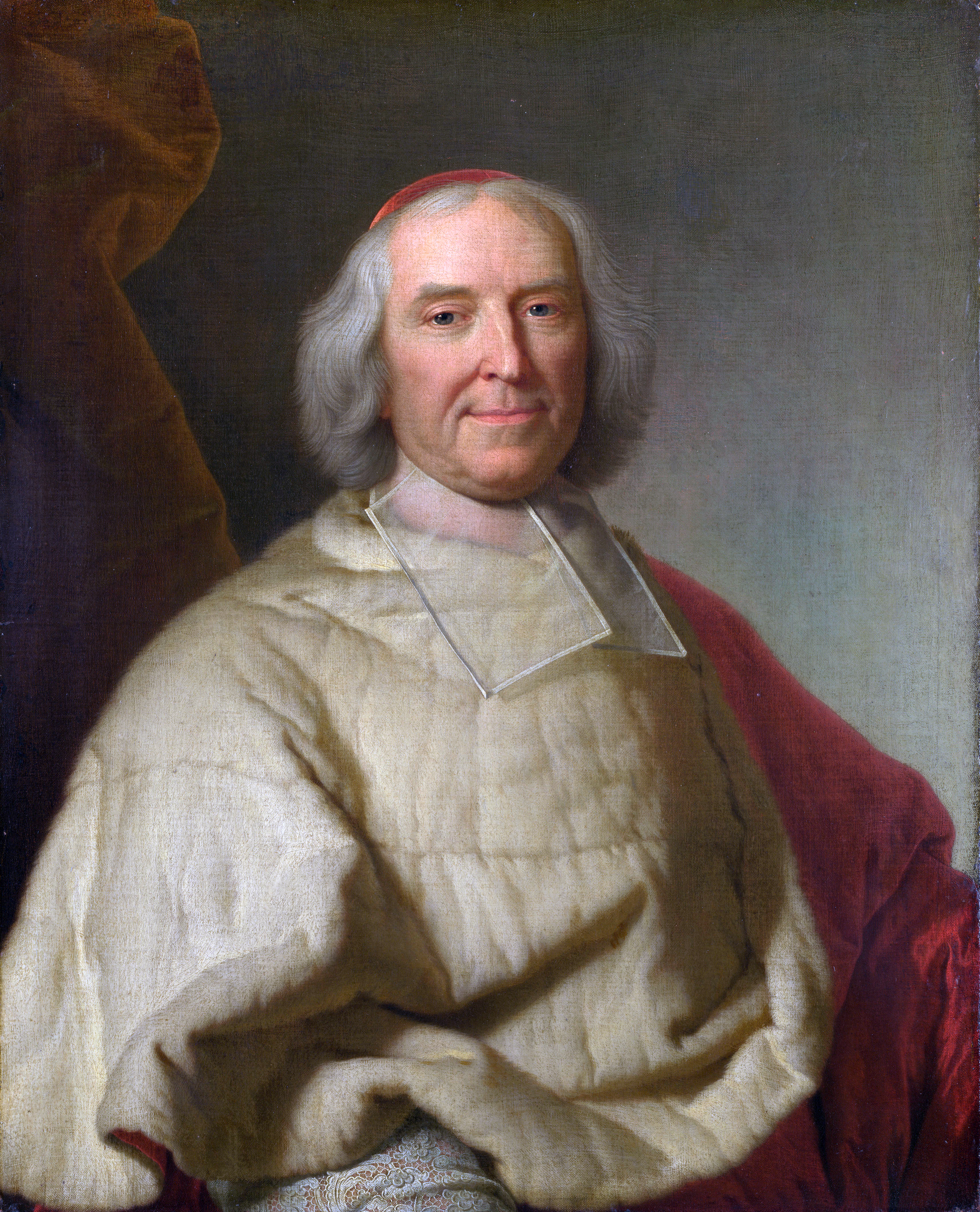
Cardinal Fleury, chief minister of France 1723 to 1743; he viewed the Jacobites as an ineffective weapon for dealing with British power

At the same time, by the late 1730s French statesmen had come to see British commercial strength as a threat to the European balance of power, and the exiled Stuarts a potential option for weakening it. However, financing a low-level insurgency was far more cost-effective than an expensive restoration, especially since the Stuarts were unlikely to be any more pro-French than the Hanoverians. (Note: Summarised in a British intelligence report of 1755; "...'tis not in the interest of France that the House of Stuart should ever be restored, as it would only unite the three Kingdoms against Them; England would have no exterior [threat] to mind, and [...] prevent any of its Descendants (the Stuarts) attempting anything against the Libertys or Religion of the People.") The remote and undeveloped Scottish Highlands were an ideal location for launching such an attempt, while the feudal nature of clan society made it relatively easy to raise troops. However, even Jacobite sympathisers were reluctant to support an uprising they recognised could be devastating for the local populace.

Opposition to taxes levied by the London government led to the 1725 malt tax riots and 1737 Porteous riots. In March 1743, the Highland-recruited 42nd Regiment of Foot was posted to Flanders, contrary to an understanding their service was restricted to Scotland, causing a short-lived mutiny. However, mutinies over pay and conditions were not unusual and the worst riots in 1725 took place in Glasgow, a town Charles noted in 1746 as one "where I have no friends and who are not at pains to hide it."

Trade disputes between Spain and Britain led to the 1739 War of Jenkins' Ear, followed in 1740–41 by the War of the Austrian Succession. The long-serving British prime minister Robert Walpole was forced to resign in February 1742 by an alliance of Tories and anti-Walpole Patriot Whigs, who then excluded their partners from government. Furious Tories like Henry Scudamore, 3rd Duke of Beaufort asked for French help in restoring James to the British throne. While war with Britain was clearly only a matter of time, Cardinal Fleury, chief minister since 1723, viewed the Jacobites as unreliable fantasists, an opinion shared by most French ministers. An exception was René Louis de Voyer de Paulmy d'Argenson, who was appointed Foreign Minister by Louis XV after Fleury died in January 1743.

== Post-1715 Jacobitism in the British Isles ==
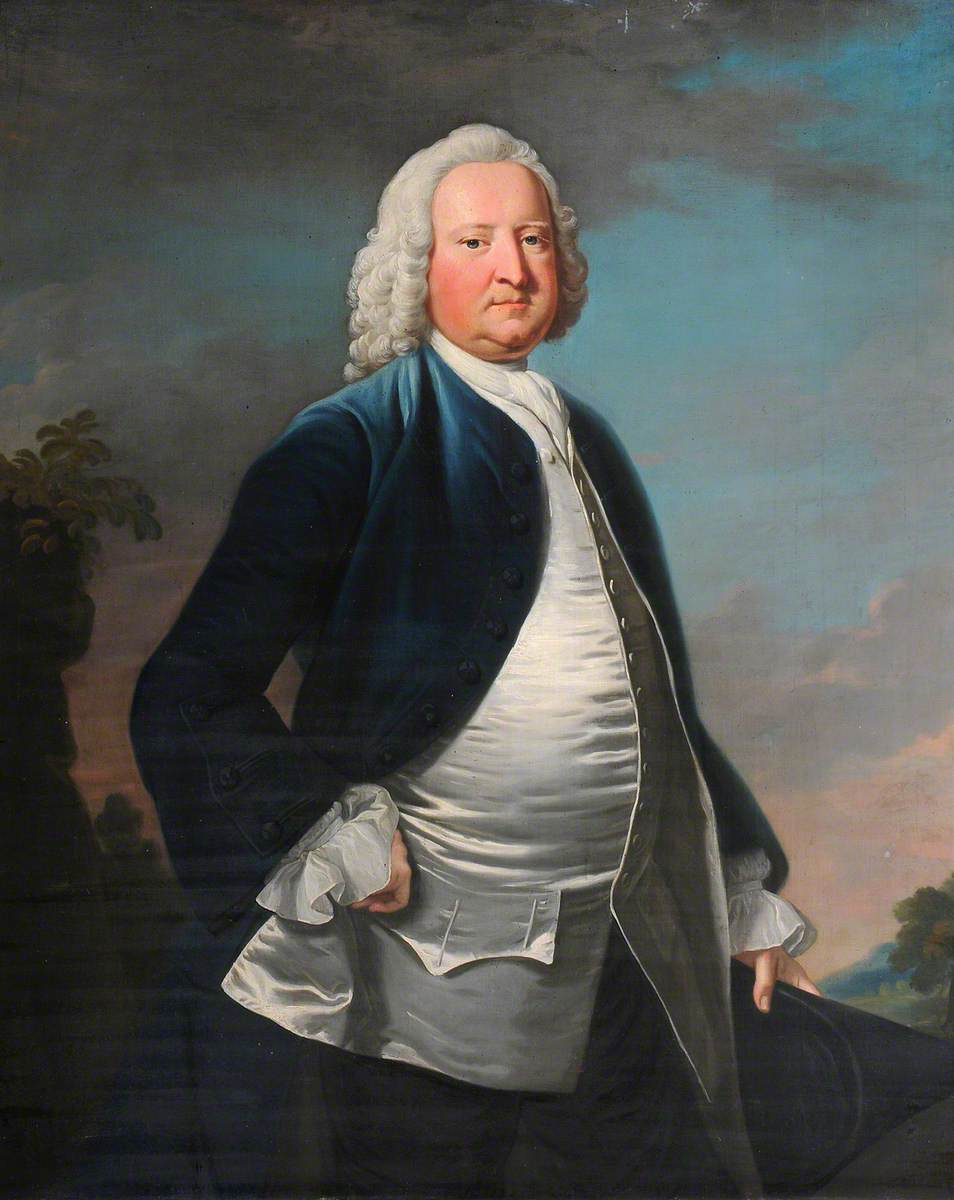
Welsh Tory Sir Watkin Williams-Wynn (1692–1749); his blue coat was a Jacobite symbol

Historian Frank McLynn identifies seven different ideological drivers behind continuing support for Jacobitism in 1745, Stuart loyalism being the least important. These divisions became increasingly apparent during the Rising, exacerbated because Charles himself was largely ignorant of the kingdoms he hoped to regain. In addition, many of his senior advisors were Irish exiles, who wanted an autonomous, Catholic Ireland and the return of lands confiscated after the Irish Confederate Wars. His grandfather James II had promised these concessions in return for Irish support in the 1689 to 1691 Williamite War in Ireland, and only a Stuart on the throne of Great Britain could ensure their fulfilment.

Such concessions were firmly opposed by Protestants who were the overwhelming majority in England, Wales and Scotland, while estimates of English support in particular confused indifference to the Hanoverians with enthusiasm for the Stuarts. After 1720, Robert Walpole tried to bind English Catholics closer to the regime by refusing to enforce laws against them. Many became government supporters, including Edward Howard, Duke of Norfolk, unofficial head of the English Catholic community. Sentenced to death in 1716, he was reprieved and remained in London during the 1745 rebellion, visiting George II to confirm his loyalty.

Most English Jacobite sympathisers were Tories who resented their exclusion from power since 1714, and viewed Hanover as a liability which involved them in expensive Continental wars of minimal benefit to Britain. These sentiments were particularly strong in the City of London, although diplomats observed opposition to foreign entanglements was true "only so long as English commerce does not suffer." However, even this group was far more concerned to ensure the primacy of the Church of England, which meant defending it from Charles and his Catholic advisors, the Scots Presbyterians who formed the bulk of his army, or Nonconformists in general; many "Jacobite" demonstrations in Wales stemmed from hostility to the 18th century Welsh Methodist revival.

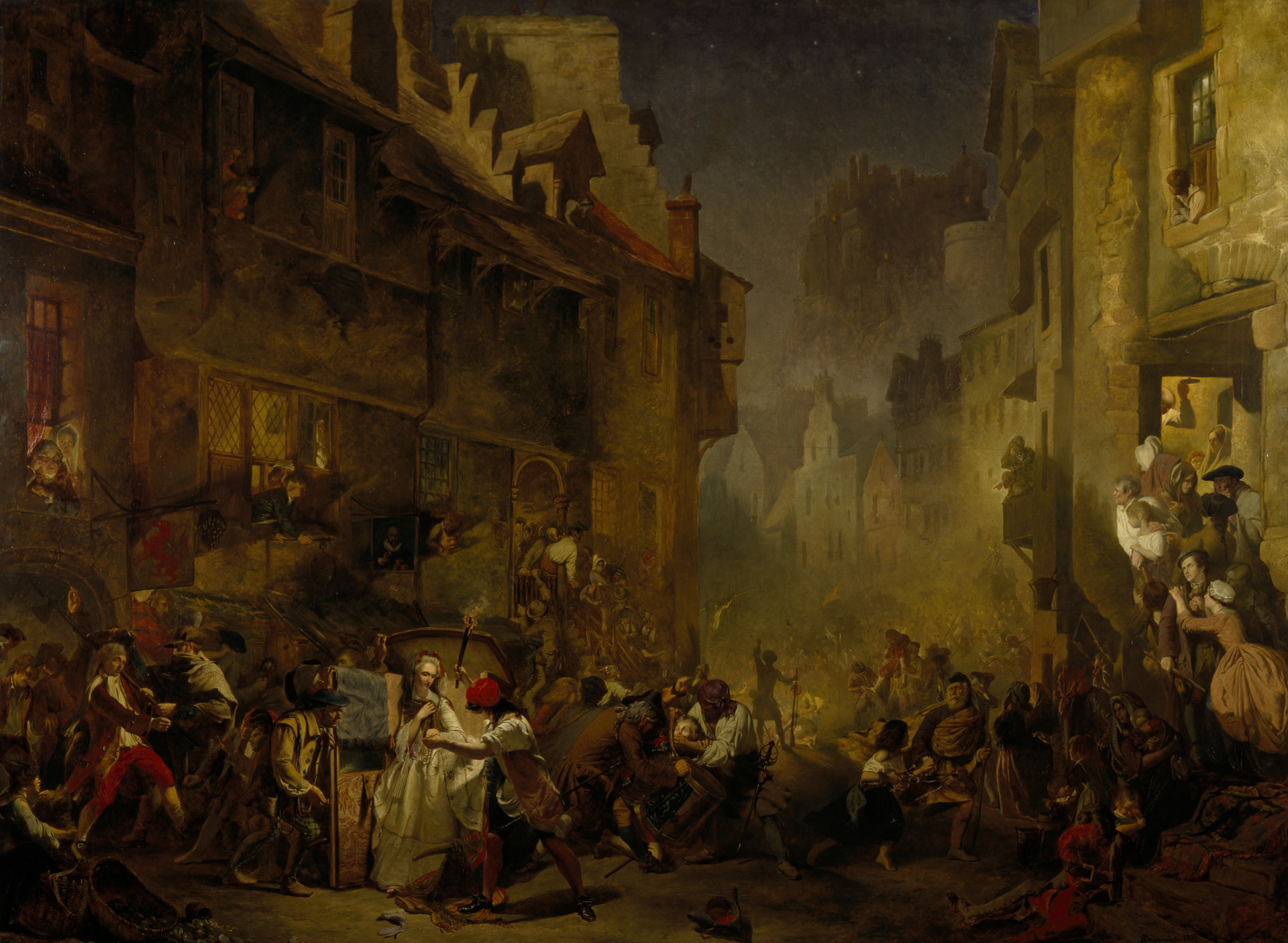
The 1737 Porteous riots in Edinburgh reflected opposition to the loss of political power following Union

The most prominent Welsh Jacobite was Denbighshire landowner and Tory Member of Parliament, Watkin Williams-Wynn, head of the Jacobite White Rose society. He met with Stuart agents several times between 1740 and 1744 and promised support "if the Prince brought a French army"; in the end, he spent the Rebellion in London, with participation by the Welsh gentry limited to two lawyers, David Morgan and William Vaughan.

After the Jacobite rising of 1719, new laws imposed penalties on Non-Jurists, those who refused to swear allegiance to the Hanoverian regime. By 1745, Non-Jurists had largely disappeared in England, but continued to be a significant element in Scotland; many of those who participated in the Rising came from Non-Jurist Scottish Episcopal Church congregations. However, the most powerful single driver for Scottish support in 1745 was opposition to the 1707 Union, whose loss of political control was not matched by perceived economic benefit. This was particularly marked in Edinburgh, former location of the Scottish Parliament, and among Highland chiefs, many of whom were heavily in debt.

In summary, Charles wanted to reclaim the throne of a united Great Britain and rule on the basis of divine right of kings and absolutism. Both principles had been rejected by the 1688 Glorious Revolution, but were reinforced by his trusted advisors, most of whom were long-term English or Irish Catholic exiles. (Note: Scots made up less than five per cent of the Jacobite court in 1696 and 1709: by far the largest element were English, followed by Irish and French.) They differed sharply from the Scottish Protestant nationalists who formed the bulk of the Jacobite army in 1745, and opposed the Union, Catholicism and "arbitrary" rule. At the same time, Jacobite exiles failed to appreciate the extent to which English Tory support derived from policy differences with the Whigs, not Stuart loyalism.

== Charles in Scotland ==
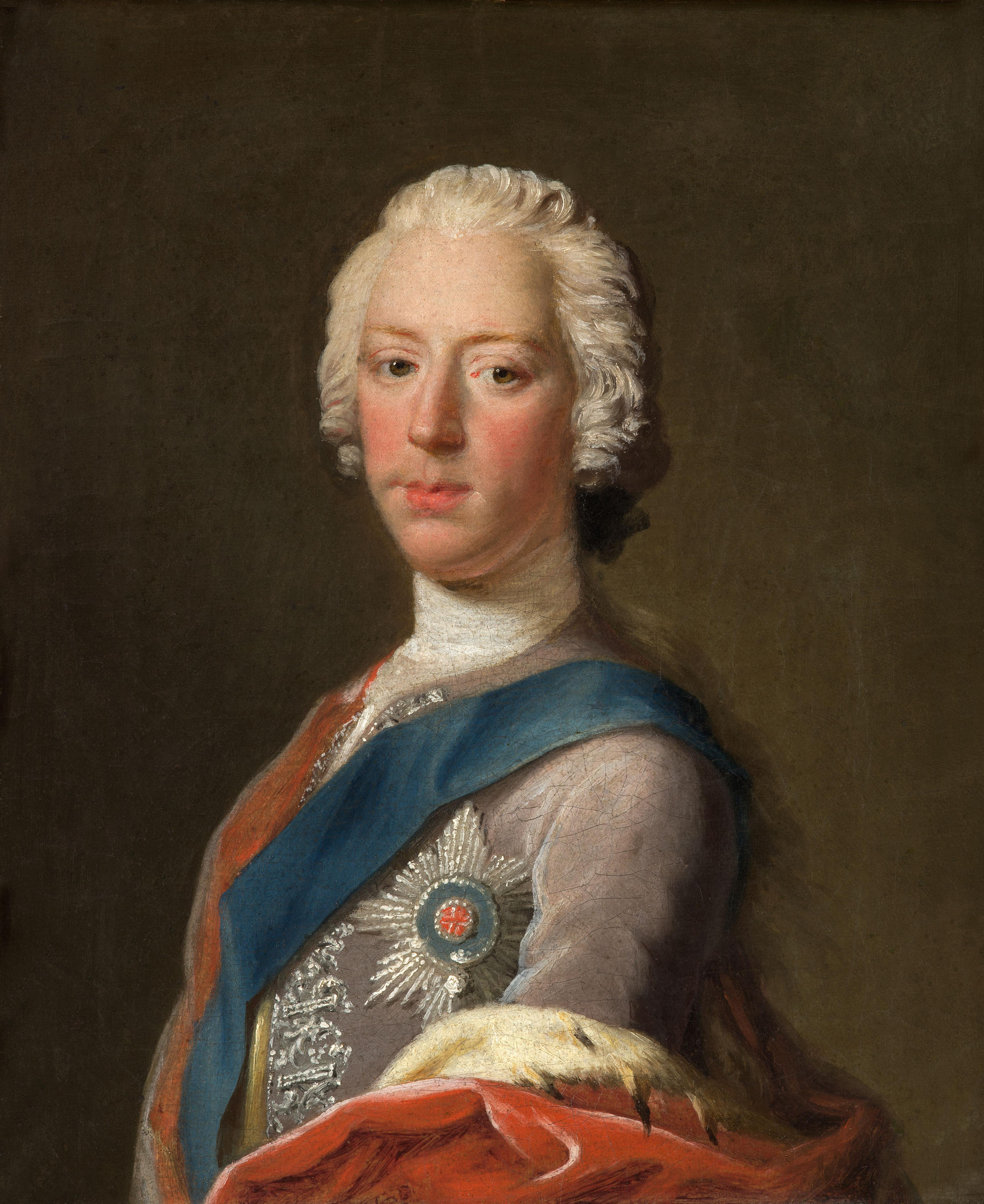
Charles Edward Stuart as European royalty, painted at Holyrood, late 1745

Purported standard of the Jacobites during the rising

Under the 1743 Pacte de Famille, Louis XV and his uncle, Philip V of Spain, agreed to co-operate against Britain, including an invasion to restore the Stuarts. In November 1743, Louis advised James this was planned for February 1744 and began assembling 12,000 troops and transports at Dunkirk, selected because it was possible to reach the Thames from there in a single tide. (Note: Should the invasion fail, it was also a convenient spot to assemble troops for a campaign in the Austrian Netherlands) Since the Royal Navy was well aware of this, the French squadron in Brest made ostentatious preparations for putting to sea, in hopes of luring away their patrols.

James remained in Rome while Charles made his way in secret to join the invasion force, but when Admiral Roquefeuil's squadron left Brest on 26 January 1744, the Royal Navy refused to follow. French naval operations against Britain often took place in the winter, when poor weather made it harder to enforce a blockade. Unfortunately, this worked both ways, and as in 1719, the invasion force was wrecked by storms. Several French ships were sunk and many others severely damaged, Roquefeuil himself being among the lives lost. In March, Louis cancelled the invasion and declared war on Britain.

In 1738, John Gordon of Glenbucket had proposed a landing in Scotland, which had been rejected by the French, and James himself. Seeking to revive this plan, in August Charles travelled to Paris where he met Sir John Murray of Broughton, liaison between the Stuarts and their supporters in Scotland. Murray subsequently claimed to have advised against it, but that Charles was "determined to come [...] though with a single footman." When Murray returned to Edinburgh with this news, his colleagues reiterated their opposition to a rising without substantial French backing, but Charles gambled that once he was in Scotland, the French would have to support him.

The battle with HMS Lion forced Elizabeth to return to port with most of the weapons and volunteers

He spent the first months of 1745 purchasing weapons. His spending was backed up by Jacobite bankers, notably by the Scotsman,Aeneas MacDonald and the Irishman, George Waters. Victory at Fontenoy in April encouraged the French authorities to provide him with two transport ships.These were the 16-gun privateer Du Teillay and Elizabeth, an elderly 64-gun warship captured from the British in 1704, which carried the weapons and 100 volunteers from the French Army's Irish Brigade. In early July, Charles boarded Du Teillay at Saint-Nazaire accompanied by the "Seven Men of Moidart", the most notable being Colonel John O'Sullivan, an Irish exile and former French officer who acted as chief of staff. The two vessels left for the Outer Hebrides on 15 July but were intercepted four days out by HMS Lion, which engaged Elizabeth. After a four-hour battle, both were forced to return to port; losing the Elizabeth and its volunteers and weapons was a major setback, but Du Teillay landed Charles at Eriskay on 23 July.

Many of those contacted advised him to return to France, including MacDonald of Sleat and Norman MacLeod. Aware of the likely penalties for defeat, they felt that by arriving without French military support, Charles had failed to keep his commitments and were unconvinced by his personal qualities. Sleat and MacLeod may also have been especially vulnerable to government sanctions, due to their involvement in illegally selling tenants into indentured servitude. Enough were persuaded but the choice was rarely simple; Donald Cameron of Lochiel committed himself only after Charles provided "security for the full value of his estate should the rising prove abortive," while MacLeod and Sleat helped him escape after Culloden.

On 19 August, the rebellion was launched with the raising of the Royal Standard at Glenfinnan, witnessed by what O'Sullivan estimated as around 700 Highlanders. This small Jacobite force used the new government-built roads to reach Perth on 4 September, where they were joined by more sympathisers. They included Lord George Murray, previously pardoned for participation in the 1715 and 1719 risings. O'Sullivan initially organised the Jacobite army along conventional military lines, but when Murray took over as chief of staff, he reverted to traditional Highland military structures and customs familiar to the majority of his recruits.

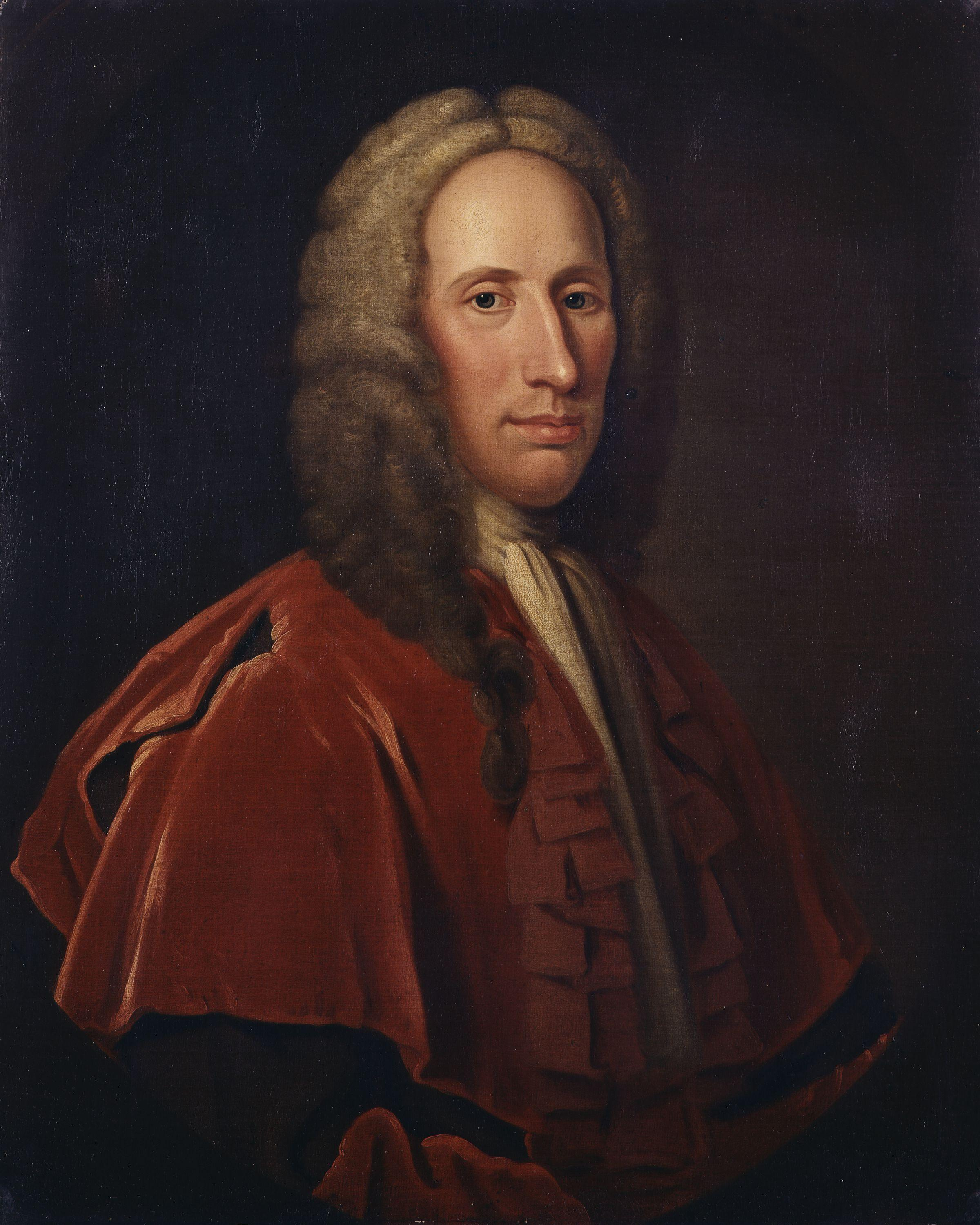
Duncan Forbes, senior government legal officer in Scotland, tirelessly organised opposition to the Jacobites

The senior government legal officer in Scotland, Lord President of the Court of Session, Duncan Forbes, 5th of Culloden, forwarded confirmation of the landing to London on 9 August. Many of the 3,000 soldiers available to John Cope, the government commander in Scotland, were untrained recruits, and while he lacked information on Jacobite intentions, they were well-informed on his, as Murray had been one of his advisors. Forbes instead relied on his relationships to keep people loyal; he failed with Lochiel and Simon Fraser, Lord Lovat but succeeded with many others, including William Sutherland, Earl of Sutherland, Clan Munro and Kenneth Mackenzie, Lord Fortrose.

On 17 September, Charles entered Edinburgh unopposed, although Edinburgh Castle itself remained in government hands; James was proclaimed King of Scotland the next day and Charles his Regent. On 21 September, the Jacobites intercepted and scattered Cope's army in less than 20 minutes at the Battle of Prestonpans, just outside Edinburgh. Prince William, Duke of Cumberland, commander of the British army in Flanders, was recalled to London, along with 12,000 troops. (Note: These included men from the Dutch garrisons of Tournai and Oudenarde, which had recently surrendered to the French. Released after agreeing not to fight against France for the next 18 months, they were available for use elsewhere. In September, around 4,500 Dutch troops arrived in England, but they were in poor condition. By November, disease had reduced their number to 2,500, and the remainder saw no action before returning home in May 1746.) To consolidate his support in Scotland, Charles published two "Declarations" on 9 and 10 October: the first dissolved the "pretended Union", the second rejected the Act of Settlement. He also instructed the Caledonian Mercury to publish minutes of the 1695 Parliamentary enquiry into the Glencoe Massacre, often used as an example of post-1688 oppression.

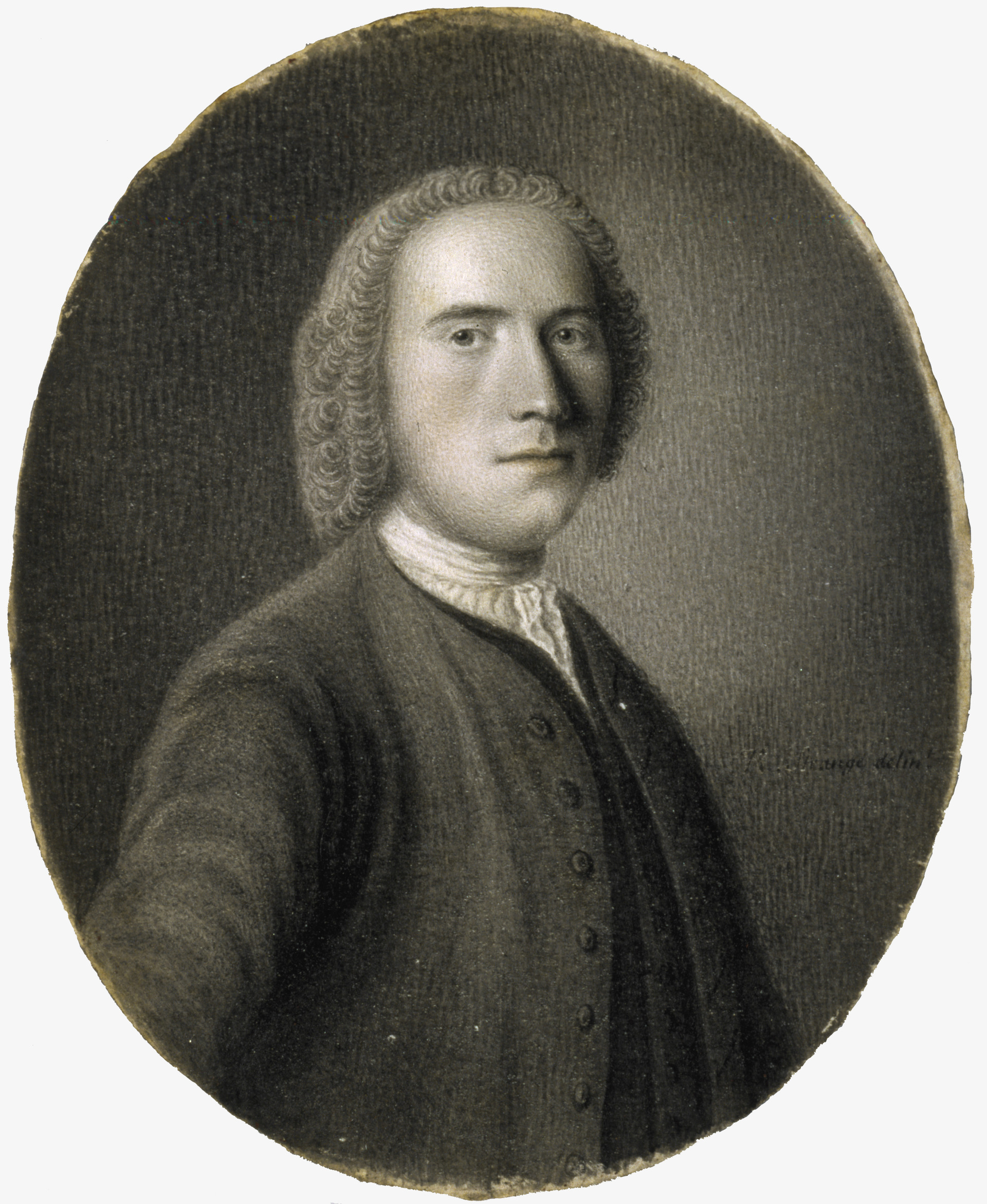
Lord George Murray; while competent, poor relationships with Charles and O'Sullivan reduced his effectiveness

Jacobite morale was further boosted in mid-October when the French landed supplies of money and weapons, together with an envoy, the Marquis d'Éguilles, which seemed to validate claims of French backing. However, David Wemyss, Lord Elcho later claimed his fellow Scots were already concerned by Charles' autocratic style and fears he was overly influenced by his Irish advisors. A "Prince's Council" of 15 to 20 senior leaders was established; Charles resented it as an imposition by the Scots on their divinely appointed monarch, while the daily meetings accentuated divisions between the factions. (Note: Elcho reported that besides himself, the Council included James Drummond, Duke of Perth, Lord George Murray; Sheridan, John Murray of Broughton, O'Sullivan, Lochiel, Keppoch, Clanranald, Glencoe, Ardsheal and Lochgarry.)

These internal tensions were highlighted by the meetings held on 30 and 31 October to discuss strategy. Most of the Scots wanted to consolidate their position and revive the pre-1707 Parliament of Scotland to help defend it against the "English armies" they expected to be sent against them. Charles was supported by the Irish exiles, for whom a Stuart on the British throne was the only way to achieve an autonomous, Catholic Ireland. Charles also claimed he was in contact with English supporters, who were simply waiting for their arrival, while d'Éguilles assured the council a French landing in England was imminent.

Despite their doubts, the Council agreed to the invasion, on condition the promised English and French support was forthcoming. (Note: In his Diary, Lord Elcho later wrote that "...the majority of the Council was not in favour of a march to England and urged that they should remain in Scotland to watch events and defend their own land. This was also the opinion in secret of the Marquis d'Éguilles; but the wishes of the Prince prevailed.") Previous Scottish incursions into England had crossed the border at Berwick-upon-Tweed, but Murray selected a route via Carlisle and the North-West of England, areas strongly Jacobite in 1715. The last elements of the Jacobite army left Edinburgh on 4 November and government forces under General Handasyde retook the city on 14th.

== Invasion of England ==
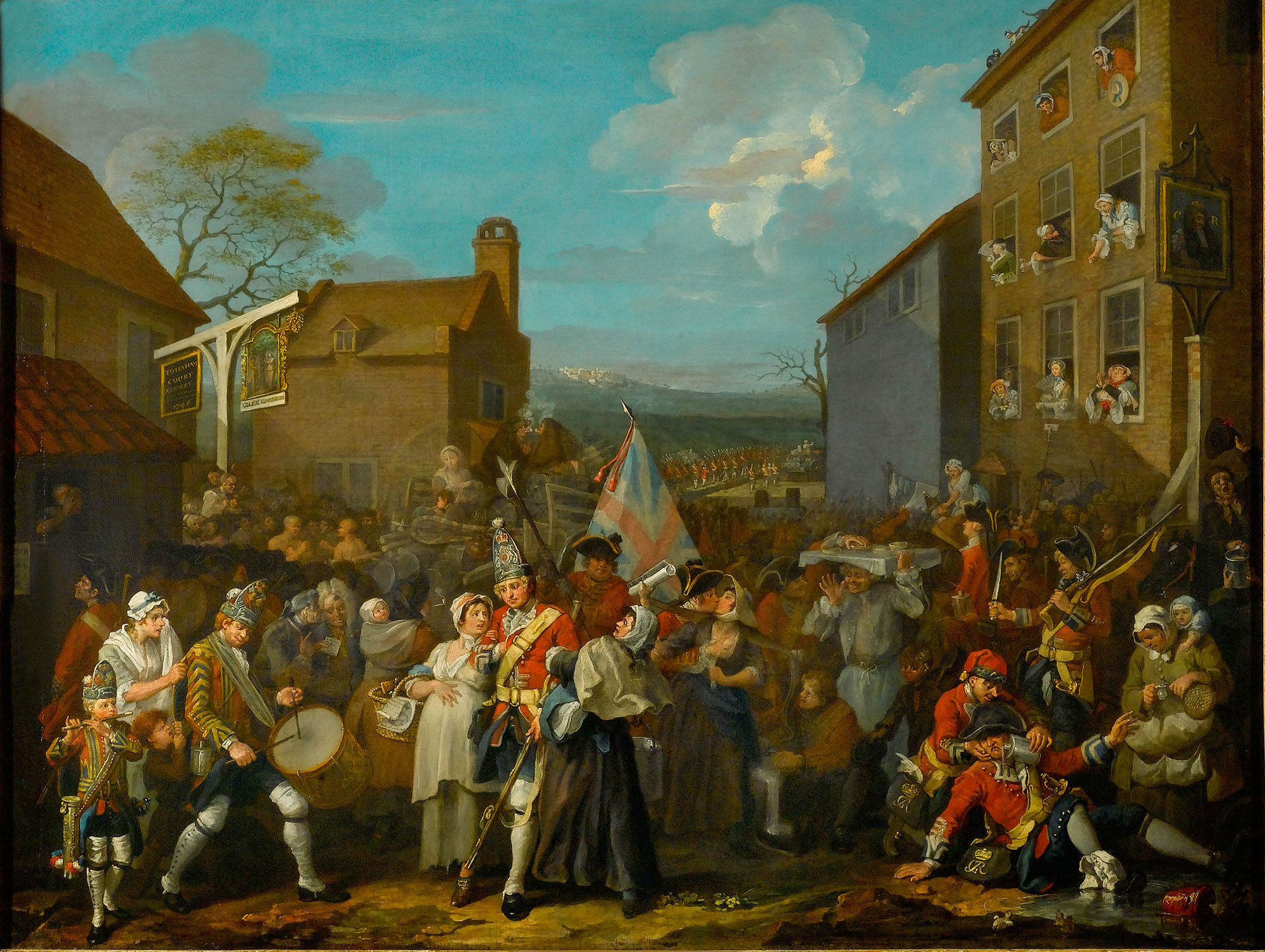
The March of the Guards to Finchley by William Hogarth; soldiers mustered to defend London against Jacobite forces

Murray divided the army into two columns to conceal their destination from General George Wade, government commander in Newcastle, and entered England on 8 November unopposed. On 10th, they reached Carlisle, an important border fortress before the 1707 Union but whose defences were now in poor condition, held by a garrison of 80 elderly veterans. However, without siege artillery the Jacobites would still have to starve it into submission, an operation for which they had neither the equipment nor time. Despite this, the castle capitulated on 15 November, after learning Wade's relief force was delayed by snow. Success reinvigorated the Jacobite cause, and when he retook the town in December, Cumberland wanted to execute those responsible.

Leaving a small garrison, the Jacobites continued south to Preston on 26 November, then Manchester on 28th. Here they received the first notable intake of English recruits, which were formed into the Manchester Regiment. Their commander was Francis Towneley, a Lancashire Catholic and former French Royal Army officer, whose elder brother Richard had narrowly escaped execution for his part in the 1715 Rising. At previous Council meetings, many Scottish members argued for withdrawal. They agreed to continue only after Charles assured them Sir Watkin Williams Wynn would meet them at Derby, while the Duke of Beaufort was preparing to seize Bristol.

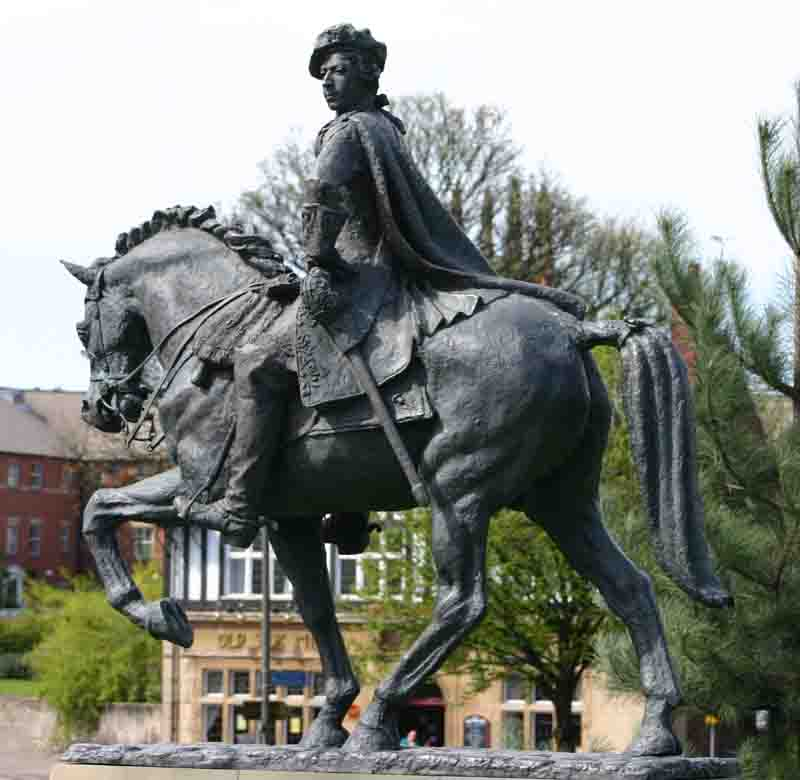
Derby; a statue of Charles Stuart commemorates the Jacobite army reaching the town in 1745

When they reached Derby on 4 December, there was no sign of any reinforcements or French landing, and the Council convened at Exeter House on 5th to discuss next steps. Despite the large crowds that turned out to see them on the march south, only Manchester provided a significant number of recruits; Preston, a Jacobite stronghold in 1715, supplied three. Murray argued they had gone as far as possible and now risked being cut off by superior forces, with Cumberland advancing north from London, and Wade moving south from Newcastle. Charles admitted he had not heard from the English Jacobites since leaving France; this meant he lied when claiming otherwise and his relationship with the Scots was irretrievably damaged.

The Council voted overwhelmingly to retreat, especially after learning from Lord Drummond that French ships had landed men, supplies and money at Montrose, Angus. They included small detachments of regulars from the "Royal Écossais" and the Irish Brigade. While less than 200 in total, Drummond allegedly claimed another 10,000 were preparing to follow, "greatly influencing" the decision.

While the decision has been debated ever since, contemporaries did not believe the Hanoverian regime would collapse, even had the Jacobites reached London. It was driven by lack of external support, not proximity to the capital, and its wisdom is supported by many modern historians. Lack of heavy weapons or equipment allowed the small Jacobite army to out-march their opponents, but made a set-piece battle extremely hazardous. In a letter of 30 November, the Duke of Richmond, who was with Cumberland's army, listed five possible options for the Jacobites, of which retreating to Scotland was by far the best for them, and the worst for the government.

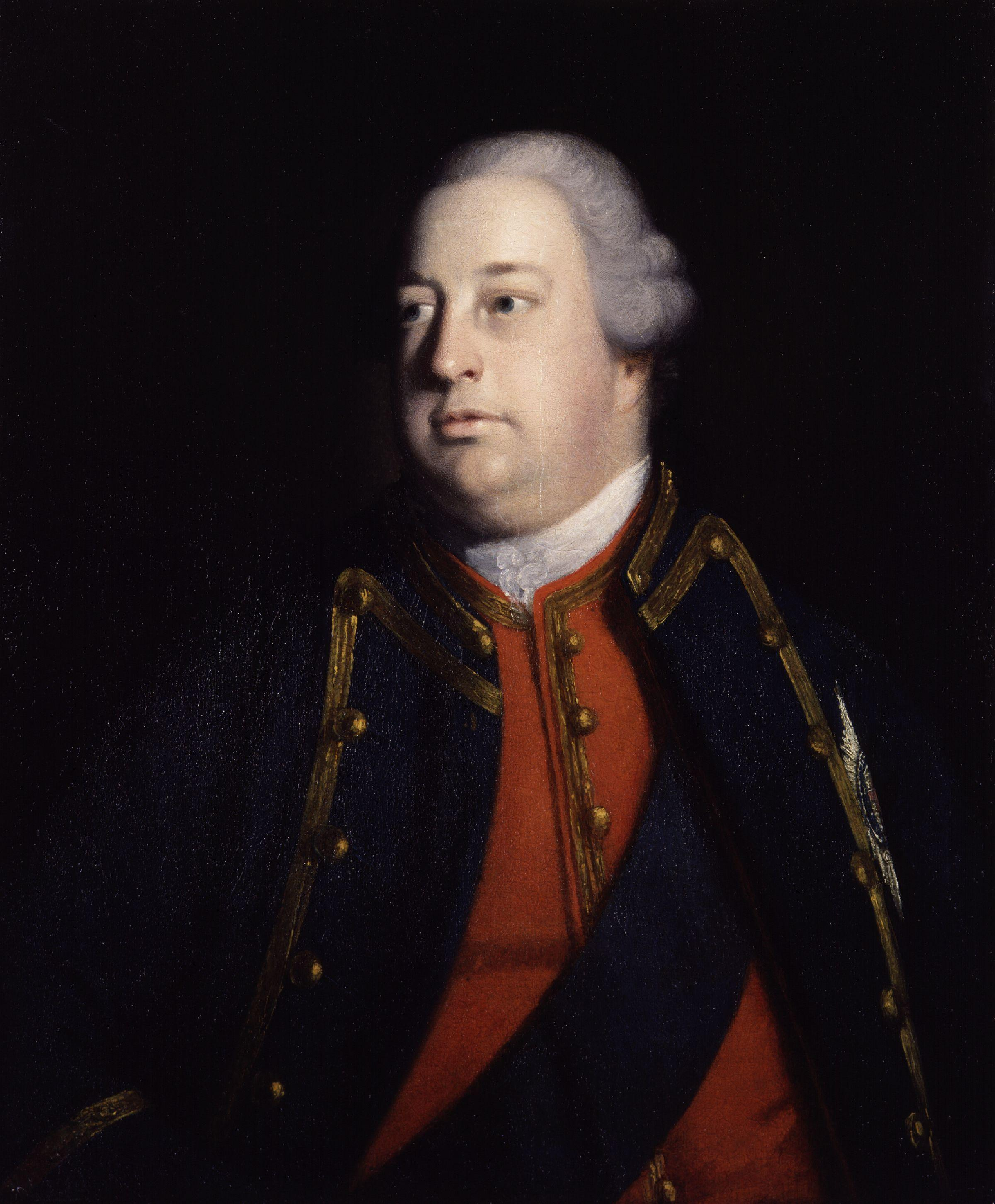
Duke of Cumberland, ca 1757

The British government was concerned by reports of an invasion fleet being prepared at Dunkirk but it is unclear how serious these plans were. Over the winter of 1745 to 1746, Maréchal Maurice de Saxe was assembling troops in Northern France in preparation for an offensive into Flanders, while Dunkirk was a major privateer base and always busy. Threatening an invasion was a far more cost-effective means of consuming British resources than actually doing so and these plans were formally cancelled in January 1746.

The retreat badly damaged the relationship between Charles and the Scots, both sides viewing the other with suspicion and hostility. Elcho later wrote that Murray believed they could have continued the war in Scotland "for several years", forcing the Crown to agree to terms as its troops were desperately needed for the war on the Continent. This seems unlikely since despite their victories in Flanders, in early 1746 Finance Minister Machault warned Louis that the British naval blockade had reduced the French economy to a "catastrophic state".

The fast-moving Jacobite army evaded pursuit with only a minor skirmish at Clifton Moor, crossing back into Scotland on 20 December. Cumberland's army arrived outside Carlisle on 22 December, and seven days later the garrison was forced to surrender, ending the Jacobite military presence in England. Much of the garrison came from the Manchester Regiment and several of the officers were later executed, including Francis Towneley.

== Road to Culloden ==
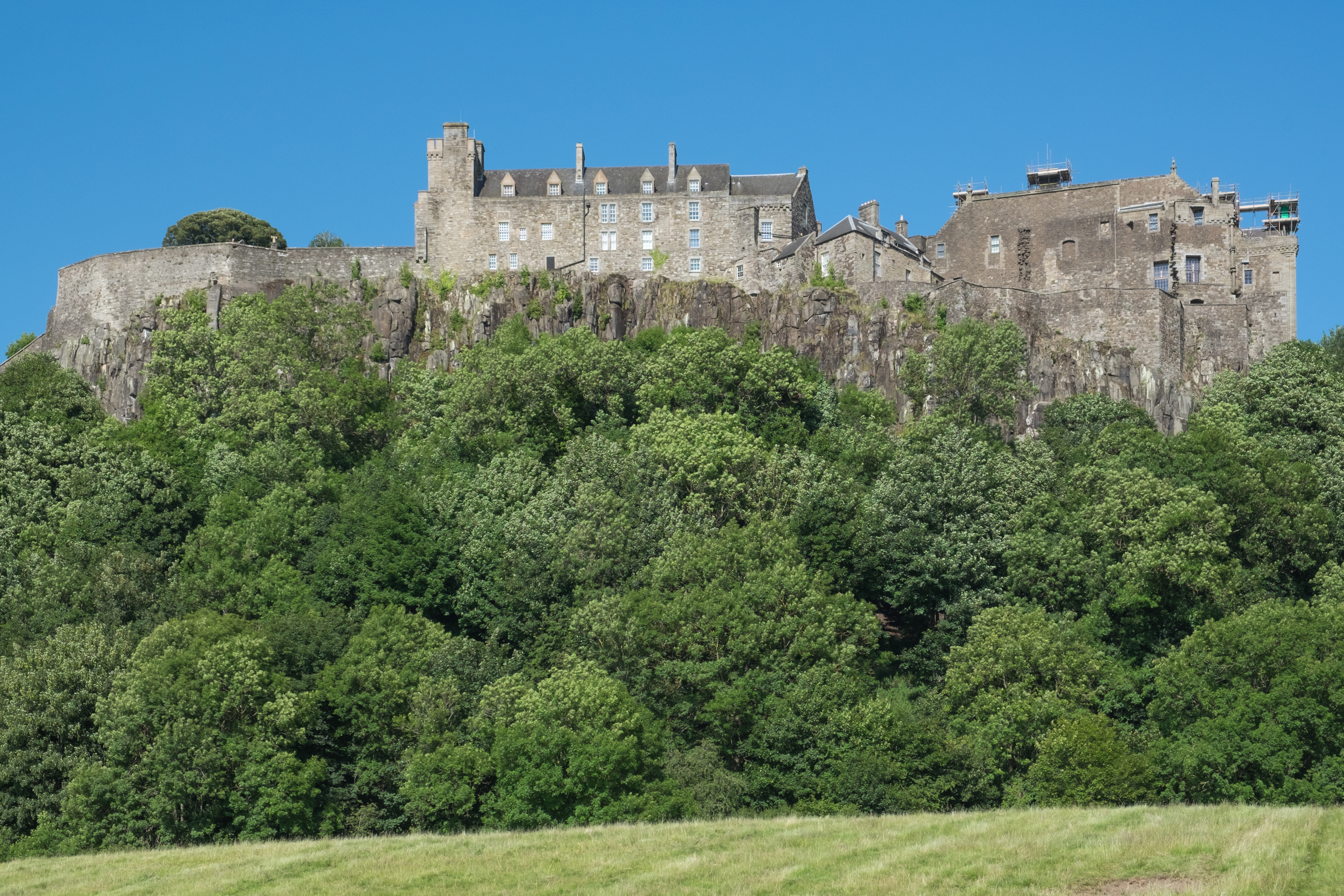
Stirling Castle; the Jacobites spent two months unsuccessfully besieging the strongest fort then in Scotland

While the invasion of England by the Stuart forces had little strategic effect, returning intact from Derby had a significant impact on morale. French reinforcements (primarily a battalion of Irish infantry in French service, French artillery personnel, weapons and gold), plus Jacobite sympathetic Lowland infantry levies from Aberdeenshire and Banffshire under Lewis Gordon, brought Jacobite strength to over 8,000 effectives. However, the troops of this augmented force were employed in warfare for which they were arguably less well suited.

Some of the force were used to suppress a counterinsurgency led by pro-government clansmen under John Campbell, 4th Earl of Loudoun. Most of the Jacobite army was occupied besieging Stirling Castle, one of the most powerful forts in Scotland. At the Battle of Falkirk Muir on 17 January, the Jacobites at Stirling repulsed a relief force under Henry Hawley, but lack of heavy artillery meant the siege itself made little progress.

Despite their defeat, Hawley's government forces had suffered few casualties and marched on Stirling again. As this was unfolding, Cumberland took over command in Scotland on 30 January. On 1 February, the Jacobite army abandoned the siege and retreated north to Inverness.

Initial deployments at the Battle of Culloden; boggy ground in front of the Jacobite centre forced them to the right; Ballimore's battalion of Loudon's Highlanders positioned behind Culwhiniac enclosure, extreme right

Cumberland and his army advanced towards Inverness via the east coast of Scotland, reaching Aberdeen on 27 February, after which both sides halted any further manoeuvre until the weather improved. By the time Cumberland resumed operations on 8 April, the Jacobites were short of food and money, and agreed fighting was their best option. The subsequent Battle of Culloden on 16 April, often cited as the last pitched battle on British soil, lasted less than an hour and ended in a decisive government victory. Exhausted by a failed night attack, many Jacobites missed the battle, leaving fewer than 5,000 to face a well-rested, more effectively trained and equipped government force of 7,000 to 9,000.

Fighting began with an artillery exchange, the guns of the government being vastly superior. Charles held his position, expecting Cumberland to attack, but he refused to do so and, unable to respond to the fire, Charles ordered his front line to charge. As they did so, boggy ground in front of the Jacobite centre forced them over to the right, where they became entangled with the right wing Jacobite regiments and where movement was further restricted by an enclosure wall.

The shift effectively increased the distance to the government lines and slowed the momentum of the charge, lengthening their exposure to government artillery, which now switched to grapeshot. Despite heavy losses, the Highlanders crashed into Cumberland's left, which gave ground but did not break, while Loudon's Highlanders fired into their flank from behind the enclosure wall. The Jacobites fell back, some in confusion, although those in the second line retired in good order, allowing Charles and his personal retinue to escape.

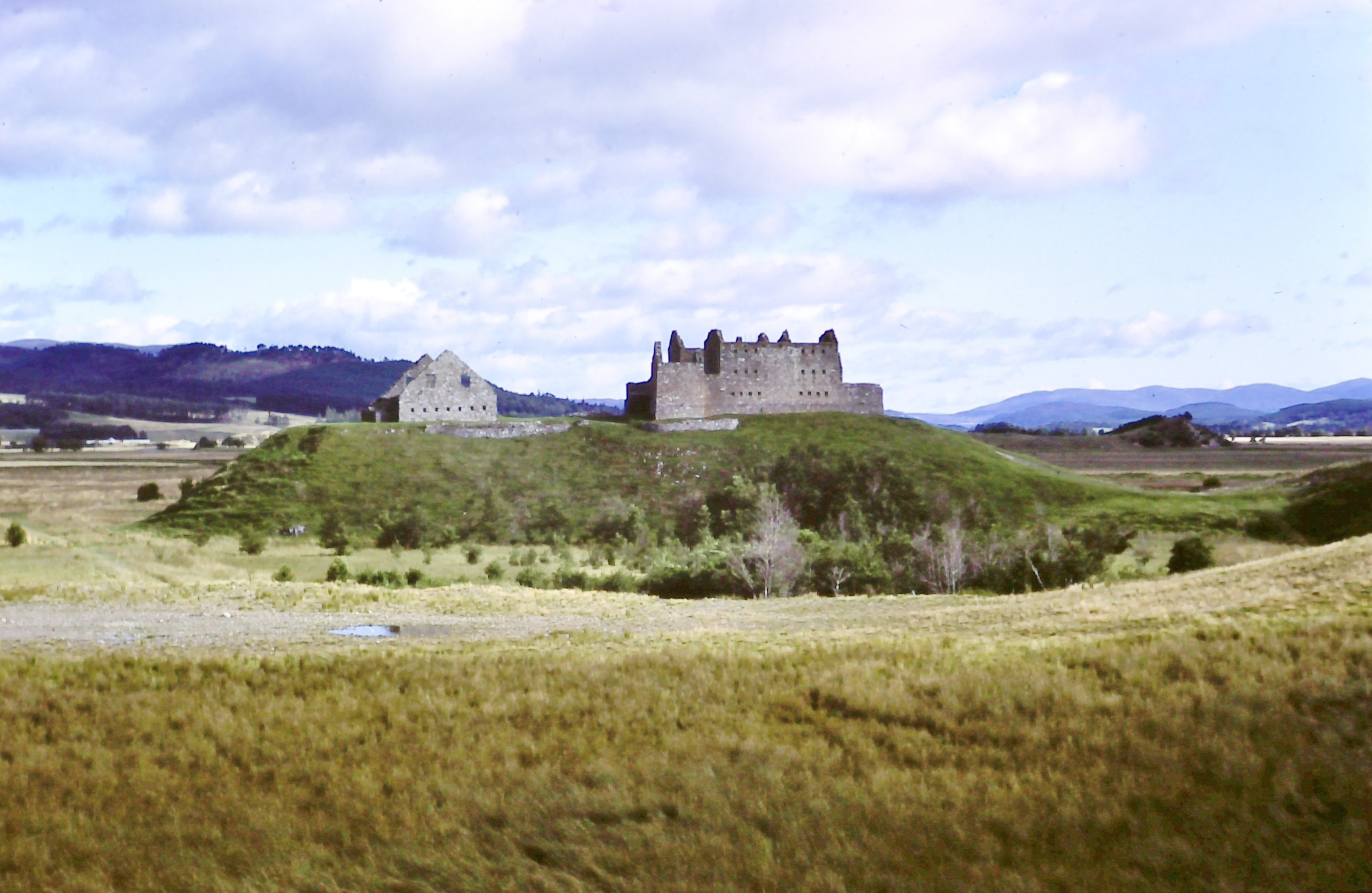
Ruthven Barracks, where over 1,500 Jacobite survivors assembled after Culloden

While much attention has been given to the ground selected by O'Sullivan as chief of staff, in reality defeat was due to numerous factors. In addition to far better artillery and superior numbers, Cumberland had drilled his troops intensively in how to counter the Highland charge, which relied on speed and ferocity to break their opponents' lines. When a Highland charge was successful, it resulted in quick victories, like those at Prestonpans and Falkirk; but if it failed, as at Culloden, the clansmen could not hold their ground.

Government casualties are estimated as 50 killed, plus 259 wounded, with Jacobite losses amounting to 1,200 to 1,500 dead, plus 500 prisoners. Over the next two days, an estimated 1,500 survivors assembled at Ruthven Barracks, nominated as an assembly point before the battle. On 20 April, Charles ordered them to disperse until he returned from France with additional support. After evading capture with the help especially of Flora MacDonald, he was picked up by a French ship on 20 September in the Sound of Arisaig. He never returned to Scotland, although the collapse of his relationship with the Scots always meant this was unlikely.

== Aftermath ==
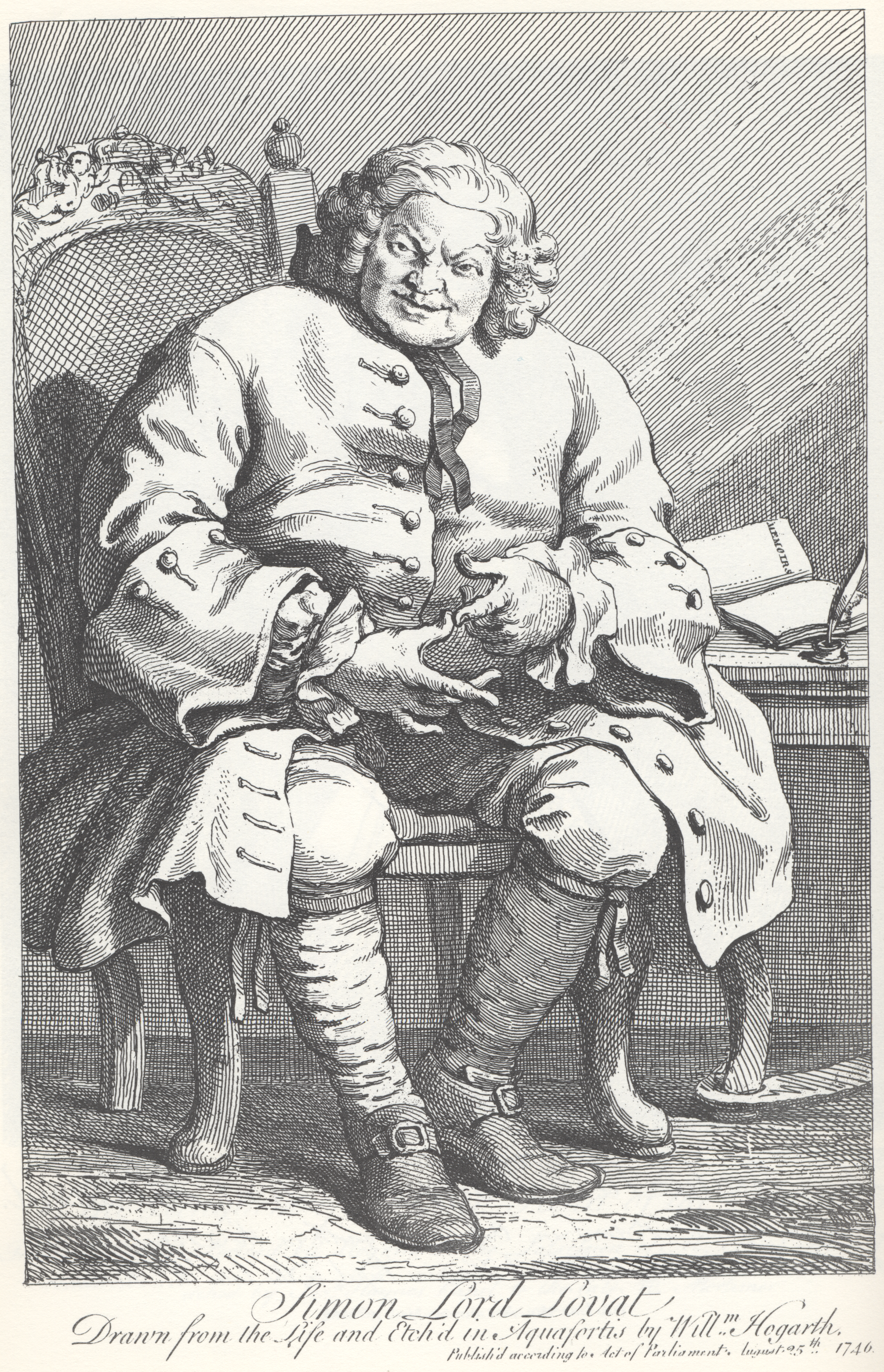
Lovat, sketched by William Hogarth at St Albans, on his way to London for trial and later execution

After Culloden, government forces spent several weeks searching for rebels, confiscating cattle and burning non-juring Episcopalian and Catholic meeting houses. These measures were in part due to a widespread perception by both sides that another landing was imminent. Regular soldiers in French service were treated as prisoners of war and exchanged regardless of nationality, but 3,500 Jacobites were indicted for treason. Of these, 120 were executed, primarily British Army deserters or members of the Manchester Regiment, 650 died awaiting trial, 900 were pardoned, and the rest transported to the colonies.

The Jacobite lords Kilmarnock, Balmerino, and Lovat were beheaded in April 1747, (Note: Lovat was the last person executed by this method in Britain) but public opinion was against further trials and the remaining prisoners were released under the General Pardon Act 1746 (20 Geo. 2. c. 52). They included Flora MacDonald, whose aristocratic admirers collected over £1,500 for her. Lord Elcho, Lord Murray and Lochiel were excluded from this and died in exile; Archibald Cameron, responsible for recruiting the Cameron regiment in 1745, was allegedly betrayed by his own clansmen on returning to Scotland and executed on 7 June 1753.

The government limited confiscations of Jacobite property, since the experience of doing so after 1715 and 1719 showed the cost often exceeded the sales price. Under the Vesting Act 1747, the estates of 51 individuals attainted for their role in 1745 were surveyed by the Court of Exchequer, of which 41 were confiscated. As happened previously, most were either purchased or claimed by creditors, with 13 made Crown land in 1755. Under the Disannexing Act 1784 (24 Geo. 3. Sess. 2. c. 57), their heirs were allowed to buy them back, in return for a total payment of £65,000.

Once north of Edinburgh or inland from ports like Aberdeen, the movement of government troops was hampered by lack of roads or accurate maps of the Highlands. To remedy this, new forts were built, the military road network started by Wade finally completed, and William Roy made the first comprehensive survey of the Highlands. Additional measures were taken to weaken the traditional clan system, which even before 1745 had been under severe stress due to changing economic conditions. The most significant was the Heritable Jurisdictions (Scotland) Act 1746, which ended the feudal power of chiefs over their clansmen. The Act of Proscription 1746 outlawed Highland dress unless worn in military service, although its impact is debated and the law was repealed in 1782.

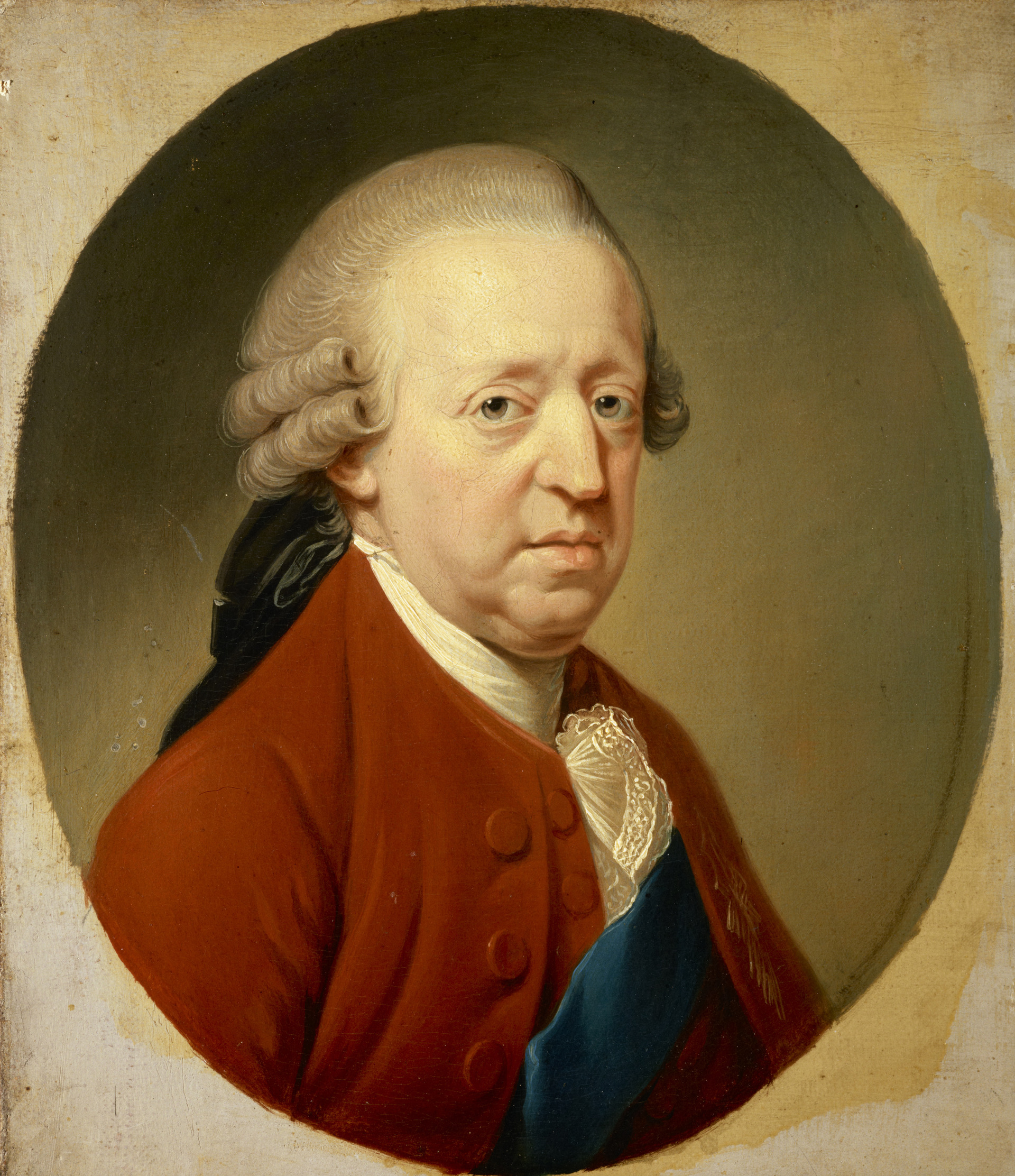
Charles Edward Stuart in old age

The Jacobite cause did not entirely disappear after 1746, but the conflicting objectives of its participants ended the movement as a serious political threat. Many Scots were disillusioned by Charles' leadership while the decline in English Jacobitism was demonstrated by the lack of support from areas strongly Jacobite in 1715, such as Northumberland and County Durham. Irish Jacobite societies increasingly reflected opposition to the existing order rather than affection for the Stuarts and were eventually absorbed by the Society of United Irishmen.

In June 1747, D'Éguilles produced a report on the Rising that was critical of the Jacobite leadership in general, while his opinion of Charles was so negative that he concluded France might be better served by supporting a Scottish Republic. Soon after this, Henry Benedict Stuart was ordained as a Roman Catholic priest; Charles viewed this as tacit acceptance that the Stuart cause was finished and never forgave him. For both leaders, the Rebellion was to be the highlight of their careers. Charles was forcibly deported from France after the 1748 Treaty of Aix-la-Chapelle and rapidly descended into alcoholism, while Cumberland resigned from the British Army in 1757 and died of a stroke in 1765.

Charles continued his attempts to reignite the cause, including making a secret visit to London in 1750, when he met supporters and briefly converted to the Non-Juring Anglican Communion. (Note: He later returned to the Catholic church) In 1759, he met to discuss another invasion with Choiseul, then Chief minister of France, but the latter dismissed him as incapable through drink. Despite Charles's urgings, Pope Clement XIII refused to recognise him as Charles III after their father died in 1766. He died of a stroke in Rome in January 1788, a disappointed and embittered man.

== Legacy ==
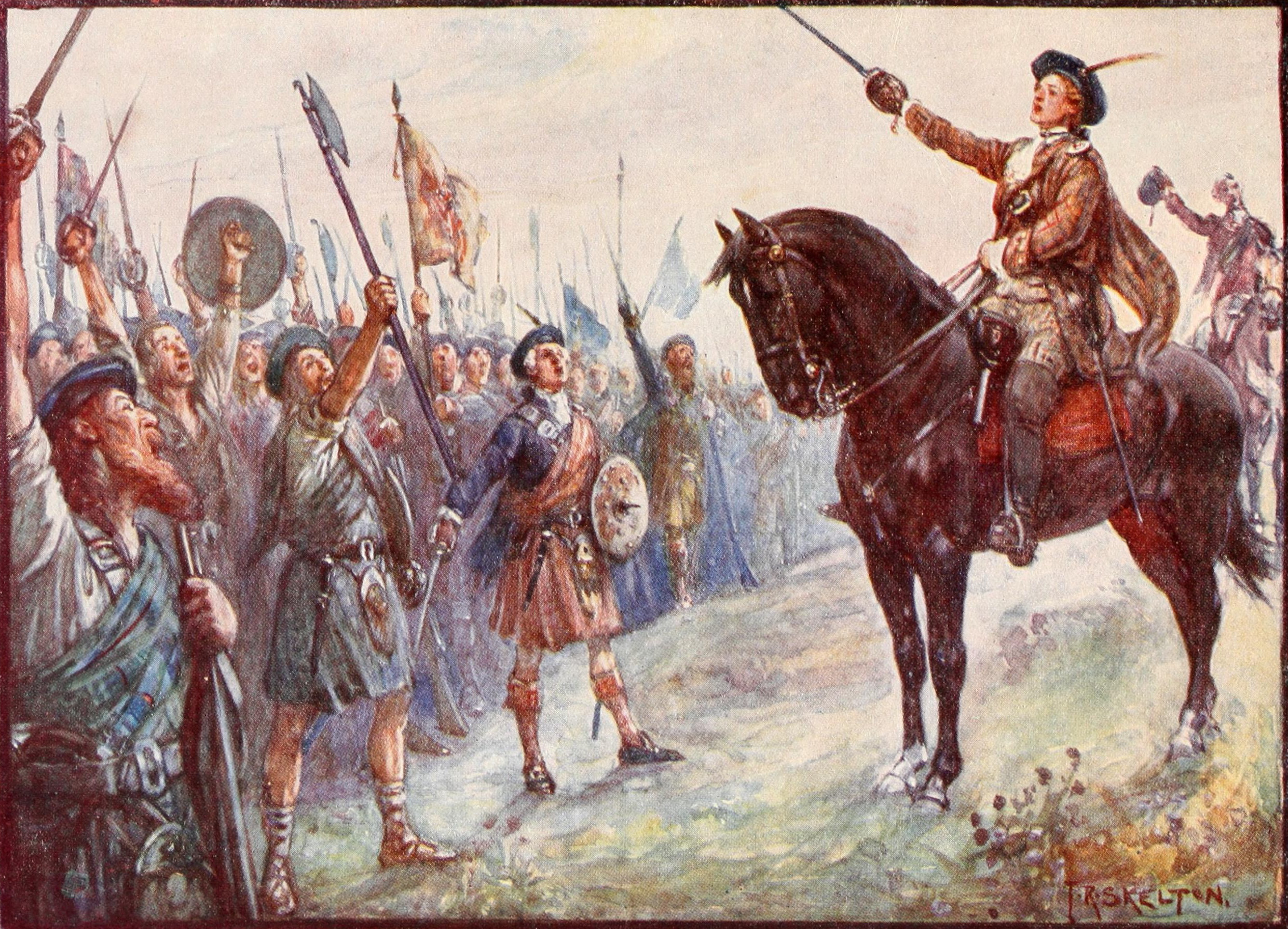
Charles Stuart, romantic icon; from A History of Scotland for Boys and Girls by H. E. Marshall, published 1906

Writing in the mid-20th century, Scottish historian Winifred Duke claimed "...the accepted idea of the Forty-Five in the minds of most people is a hazy and picturesque combination of a picnic and a crusade ... in cold reality, Charles was unwanted and unwelcomed." Modern commentators argue the focus on "Bonnie Prince Charlie" obscures the fact that many participants in the Rising did so because they opposed the Union, not the Hanoverians. As a result, this nationalist aspect makes it part of an ongoing political idea, rather than the last act of a doomed Highland cause and culture.

One example of how this influenced historical perspectives is the tendency to portray the Jacobite Army as composed largely of Gaelic-speaking Highlanders. As recently as 2013, the Culloden Visitors Centre listed Lowland regiments such as Lord Elcho's and Balmerino's Life Guards, Baggot's Hussars and Viscount Strathallan's Perthshire Horse as "Highland Horse". Although a significant proportion were Highlanders, the army included many Lowland units, limited numbers of English, and several hundred French and Irish regulars.

After 1745, the popular perception of Highlanders changed from that of "wyld, wykkd Helandmen", who were racially and culturally distinct from other Scots, to members of a noble warrior race. For a century before 1745, rural poverty drove increasing numbers to enlist in foreign armies, such as the Dutch Scots Brigade, but while many Highlanders had military experience, the military aspects of clanship had been in decline for many years, the last significant inter-clan battle being Maol Ruadh in August 1688. Foreign service was banned in 1745 and recruitment into the British Army accelerated as deliberate policy. Victorian imperial administrators accentuated this by recruiting from the so-called "martial races", with Highlanders, Sikhs, Dogras and Gurkhas being grouped together as those who were arbitrarily identified as sharing military virtues.

Before 1707, Scots writers were part of a wider and often uniform European literary culture. The creation of a uniquely Scottish style began as a reaction to Union, with poets like Allan Ramsay using Scots vernacular for the first time. After the Rising, reconciling the Jacobite past with a Unionist present meant focusing on a shared cultural identity, made easier by the fact it did not imply sympathy for the Stuarts; Ramsay was one of those who left Edinburgh when it fell to the Jacobites in 1745. However, the study of Scottish history itself was largely ignored by schools and universities until the mid-20th century.

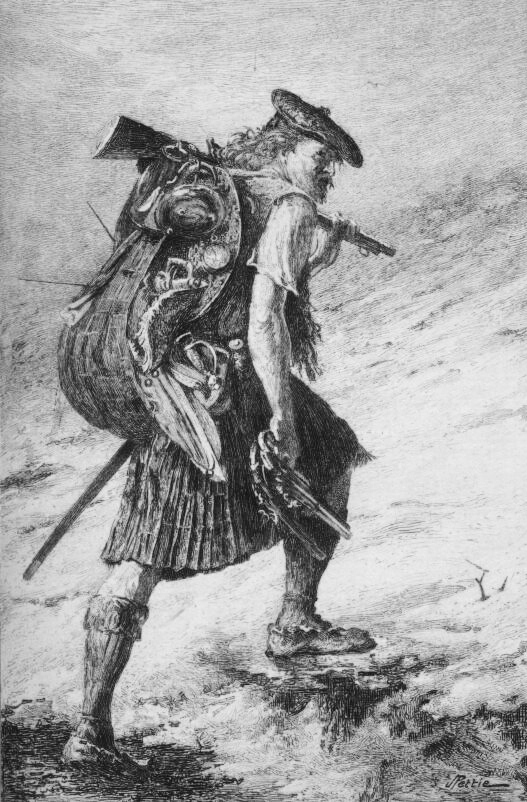
"Disbanded", illustration by John Pettie in the 1893 edition of Waverley

The vernacular style was continued after 1745, most famously by Robert Burns but others avoided recent divisions within Scottish society by looking back to a far more distant and largely mythical past. These included James Macpherson, who between 1760 and 1765 published the Ossian cycle which was a best-seller throughout Europe. The claim that it was a translation from the original Gaelic has been disputed ever since but the post-1746 sense of a culture under threat led to an upsurge in Scottish Gaelic literature, much of it related to the events of the Rising. Alasdair mac Mhaighstir Alasdair, generally credited as author of the first secular works in Gaelic in the early 1740s, was followed by Gaelic poets including Donnchadh Bàn Mac an t-Saoir, who participated in the Rising as part of a government militia, and Catriona Nic Fhearghais, who allegedly lost her husband at Culloden.

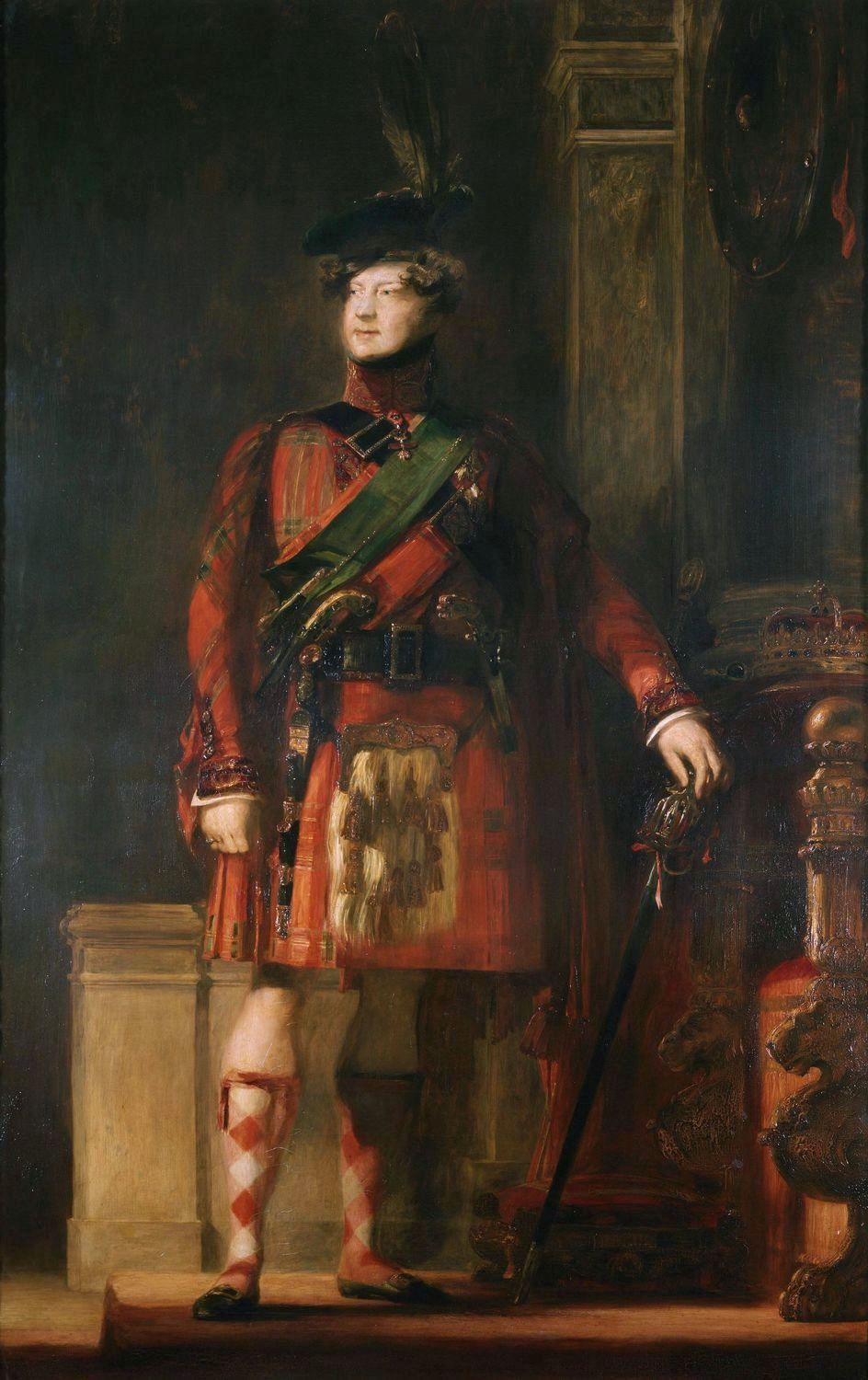
George IV in a kilt

The Rising has been a popular topic for writers such as D. K. Broster and Sir Walter Scott, whose 1814 novel Waverley presented it as part of a shared Unionist history. (Note: In his novels, Scott provided a highly romanticised view of both English and Scottish history, which one contemporary described as "crude, uncertain and often false", but which still inform modern perspectives) The hero of Waverley is an Englishman who fights for the Stuarts, rescues a Hanoverian Colonel and finally rejects a romantic Highland beauty for the daughter of a Lowland aristocrat. Scott's reconciliation of Unionism and the '45 allowed Cumberland's great-nephew George IV to be painted less than 70 years later wearing Highland dress and tartans, previously symbols of Jacobite rebellion. Monuments to the rebellion were eventually permitted, with the Glenfinnan Monument (1814), being a prominent example.

Replacing a complex and divisive historical past with a simplified but shared cultural tradition led to the Victorian inventions of Burns Suppers, Highland Games, tartans and the adoption by a largely Protestant nation of the Catholic icons Mary, Queen of Scots and Bonnie Prince Charlie. These continue to shape modern perspectives on the Scots past.

== Sources ==
- "The '45 in Northumberland and Durham". The Northumbrian Jacobite Society. Archived from the original on 9 October 2015.
- Aikman, Christian (2001). No Quarter Given: The Muster Roll of Prince Charles Edward Stuart's Army, 1745–46 (3rd rev. ed.). Neil Wilson Publishing. ISBN 978-1-9032-3802-8.
- Anderson, BJ, ed. (1902). The Albemarle papers; being the correspondence of William Anne, second earl of Albemarle, commander-in-chief in Scotland, 1746–1747. Aberdeen University.
- "Battle of Culloden". British Battles.
- Black, Jeremy (1999). Britain as a Military Power, 1688–1815. Routledge. ISBN 978-1-8572-8772-1.
- Blaikie, Walter Biggar (1916). Origins of the 'Forty-Five, and Other Papers Relating to That Rising. T. and A. Constable at the Edinburgh University Press for the Scottish History Society. OCLC 2974999.
- Bromley, J. S. (1987). Corsairs and Navies, 1600–1760. Hambledon Press. ISBN 978-0-9076-2877-4.
- Buchan, James (2003). Crowded with Genius: The Scottish Enlightenment: Edinburgh's Moment of the Mind. HarperCollins. ISBN 978-0-0605-5888-8.
- Campsie, Alison (31 October 2017). "Myth Buster: Was Tartan Really Banned After Culloden?". The Scotsman. Archived from the original on 21 November 2017.
- Chambers, Robert (2018) [1827]. History of the Rebellion of 1745–6. Forgotten Books. ISBN 978-1-3335-7442-0.
- Colley, Linda (2009). Britons: Forging the Nation 1707–1837 (3rd ed.). Yale University Press. ISBN 978-0-3001-5280-7.
- Corp, Edward (2014). "The Scottish Jacobite Community at Saint-Germain after the Departure of the Stuart Court". In Macinnes, Allan I.; German, Kieran; Graham, Lesley (eds.). Living with Jacobitism, 1690–1788: The Three Kingdoms and Beyond. Pickering & Chatto. pp. 27–38. ISBN 978-1-8489-3470-2.
- Cruikshanks, Lauchlin Alexander (2008). The Act of Union: Death or Reprieve for the Highlands?. Wesleyan University. OCLC 705142720.
- Davies, Huw (2022). The Wandering Army; The Campaigns that transformed the British way of war. Yale University Press. ISBN 978-0-3002-1716-2.
- Devine, T. M. (1994). Clanship to Crofters' War: The Social Transformation of the Scottish Highlands. Manchester University Press. ISBN 978-0-7190-3482-4.
- Dickson, William Kirk, ed. (1895). The Jacobite Attempt of 1719: Letters of James Butler, second Duke of Ormonde. T. and A. Constable at the Edinburgh University Press for the Scottish History Society. OCLC 652345728.
- Duffy, Christopher (2003). The '45: Bonnie Prince Charlie and the Untold Story of the Jacobite Rising (1st ed.). Orion. ISBN 978-0-3043-5525-9.
- Duke, Winifred (1927). Lord George Murray and the Forty-five (1st ed.). Milne & Hutchison.
- Elcho, David (2010) [1748]. A Short Account of the Affairs of Scotland in the Years 1744–46. Kessinger Publishing. ISBN 978-1-1635-3524-0.
- Fremont, Gregory (2011). The Jacobite Rebellion 1745–46. Osprey Publishing. ISBN 978-1-8460-3992-8.
- French, Richard (1967). "Sir Walter Scott as historian" (PDF). Dalhousie Review. 47 (2): 159–172.
- Gold, John R; Gold, Margaret M (2007). "'The Graves of the Gallant Highlanders': Memory, Interpretation and Narratives of Culloden". History and Memory. 19 (1): 5. doi:10.2979/his.2007.19.1.5. S2CID 154655376.
- Gooch, Leo (2004). "Towneley, Francis (1709–1746)". Oxford Dictionary of National Biography (online ed.). Oxford University Press. doi:10.1093/ref:odnb/27603. (Subscription, Wikipedia Library access or UK public library membership required.)
- Graham, Roderick (2014). Bonnie Prince Charlie: Truth or Lies. Saint Andrew Press. ISBN 978-0-8615-3783-9.
- Groves, Percy (2017) [1893]. History of the 42nd Royal Highlanders: The Black Watch, Now The First Battalion The Black Watch (Royal Highlanders) 1729–1893. W. & A. K. Johnston. ISBN 978-1-3762-6948-2.
- Harding, Richard (2013). The Emergence of Britain's Global Naval Supremacy: The War of 1739–1748. Boydell Press. ISBN 978-1-8438-3823-4.
- Harris, Tim (2006). Revolution: the Great Crisis of the British Monarchy 1685–1720. Penguin. ISBN 978-0-1410-1652-8.
- Higgins, Charlotte (2014). Under Another Sky: Journeys in Roman Britain. Random House Vintage Books. ISBN 978-0-0995-5209-3.
- Hopkins, Paul (1998). Glencoe and the end of the Highland Wars. John Donald Publishers Ltd. ISBN 0-8597-6490-7.
- "The Inventory of Historic Battlefields – Battle of Culloden" (PDF). Historic Scotland. Archived from the original (PDF) on 8 December 2023.
- "Jacobite Stories: the Battle of Culloden". National Trust for Scotland. 22 February 2017.
- Kidd, Colin (April 1997). "'The Strange Death of Scottish History' Revisited: Constructions of the Past in Scotland, c. 1790–1914". Scottish Historical Review. lxxvi (100): 86–102. doi:10.3366/shr.1997.76.1.86. JSTOR 25530740.
- Kidd, Colin (November 2013). From Jacobitism to the SNP: the Crown, the Union and the Scottish Question (PDF) (Speech). The Stenton Lecture. Archived (PDF) from the original on 25 March 2017.
- Lenman, Bruce (1980). The Jacobite Risings in Britain 1689–1746. Methuen Publishing. ISBN 978-0-4133-9650-1.
- Lewis, William (1977). Horace Walpole's Correspondence; Volume 19. Yale University Press. ISBN 978-0-3000-0703-9.
- Mackillop, Andrew (1995). Military Recruiting in the Scottish Highlands 1739–1815: the Political, Social and Economic Context (PhD thesis). University of Glasgow. OCLC 59608677.
- McCann, Jean E (1963). The Organisation of the Jacobite Army (PHD thesis). Edinburgh University. OCLC 646764870.
- McKay, Derek (1983). The Rise of the Great Powers 1648–1815 (First ed.). Routledge. ISBN 978-0-5824-8554-9.
- McLynn, Frank (October 1980). "An Eighteenth-Century Scots Republic? An Unlikely Project from Absolutist France". The Scottish Historical Review. 59 (168): 177–181. JSTOR 25529380.
- McLynn, Frank (1982). "Issues and Motives in the Jacobite Rising of 1745". The Eighteenth Century. 23 (2): 177–181. JSTOR 41467263.
- Mearns, Alasdair B. (2007). "Catriona Nic Fhearghais (Christiana Fergusson)". In Ewan, Elizabeth; Pipes, Rose; Rendall, Jane; Reynolds, Siân (eds.). The Biographical Dictionary of Scottish Women. Edinburgh University Press. ISBN 978-0-7486-3293-0.
- Millar, Alexander Hastie (1907). A selection of Scottish forfeited estates papers. Scottish History Society; Volume LVII.
- Monod, Paul Kleber (1993). Jacobitism and the English People, 1688–1788. Cambridge University Press. ISBN 978-0-5214-4793-5.
- Morris, R. J. (1992). "Victorian Values in Scotland & England" (PDF). In Smout, T. C. (ed.). Victorian Values. Proceedings of the British Academy. Vol. 78. ISBN 978-0-1972-6119-4.
- Mudie, Robert. "Historical Account of His Majesty's Visit to Scotland, Edinburgh, 1822". National Library of Scotland. Archived from the original on 12 September 2014.
- Murray, John (1898). Bell, Robert Fitzroy (ed.). Memorials of John Murray of Broughton: Sometime Secretary to Prince Charles Edward, 1740–1747. T. and A. Constable at the Edinburgh University Press for the Scottish History Society. OCLC 879747289.
- Oates, Jonathan (2007). "Dutch Forces in Eighteenth-Century Britain; A British Perspective". Journal of the Society for Army Historical Research. 85 (341): 20–39. JSTOR 44231432.
- Pittock, Murray (1998). Jacobitism. Palgrave Macmillan. ISBN 978-0-3336-6798-9.
- Pittock, Murray (2004). "Charles Edward Stuart; styled Charles; known as the Young Pretender, Bonnie Prince Charlie". Oxford Dictionary of National Biography (online ed.). Oxford University Press. doi:10.1093/ref:odnb/5145. (Subscription, Wikipedia Library access or UK public library membership required.)
- Pittock, Murray (2016). Great Battles; Culloden (1st ed.). Oxford University Press. ISBN 978-0-1996-6407-8.
- Quynn, Dorothy Mackay (1941). "Flora MacDonald in History". The North Carolina Historical Review. 18 (3): 236–258. JSTOR 23516055.
- Reid, Stuart (1996). British Redcoat 1740–93. Osprey Publishing. ISBN 978-1-8553-2554-8.
- Riding, Jacqueline (2016). Jacobites: A New History of the 45 Rebellion. Bloomsbury. ISBN 978-1-4088-1912-8.
- Robb, Steven (2013). "Gordon, Robert (1703–1779)". Oxford Dictionary of National Biography (online ed.). Oxford University Press. doi:10.1093/ref:odnb/105934. (Subscription, Wikipedia Library access or UK public library membership required.)
- Roberts, John (2002). The Jacobite Wars: Scotland and the Military Campaigns of 1715 and 1745. Edinburgh University Press. ISBN 978-1-9029-3029-9.
- Rodger, Johnny (9 March 2016). The Hero Building. Burlington, VT: Routledge. ISBN 978-1-317-02914-4.
- Royle, Trevor (2016). Culloden; Scotland's Last Battle and the Forging of the British Empire. Little, Brown. ISBN 978-1-4087-0401-1.
- Seymour, W. A. (1980). A History of the Ordnance Survey. Dawson. ISBN 978-0-7129-0979-2.
- Shinsuke, Satsuma (2013). Britain and Colonial Maritime War in the Early Eighteenth Century. Boydell Press. ISBN 978-1-8438-3862-3.
- Smith, Annette M. (1975). The Forfeited Estates Papers, 1745: a study of the work of the Commissioners for the Forfeited Annexed Estates, 1755–1784, with particular reference to their contribution to the development of communications in Scotland in the eighteenth century (PhD thesis). University of St Andrews. hdl:10023/2923.
- Somerset, Anne (2012). Queen Anne; the Politics of Passion. HarperCollins. ISBN 978-0-0072-0376-5.
- Sroka, Kenneth M. (1980). "Education in Walter Scott's Waverley". Studies in Scottish Literature. 15 (1). eISSN 0039-3770.
- Stephen, Jeffrey (January 2010). "Scottish Nationalism and Stuart Unionism: The Edinburgh Council, 1745". Journal of British Studies. 49 (1, Scotland Special Issue): 47–72. doi:10.1086/644534. JSTOR 27752690. S2CID 144730991.
- Stewart, James A. Jr. (2001). "Highland Motives in the Jacobite Rising of 1745–46: 'Forcing Out,' Traditional Documentation and Gaelic Poetry". Proceedings of the Harvard Celtic Colloquium. 20/21: 141–173. ISBN 978-0-6740-2383-3. JSTOR 41219594.
- Streets, Heather (2010). Martial Races: The Military, Race and Masculinity in British Imperial Culture, 1857–1914. Manchester University Press. ISBN 978-0-7190-6963-5.
- Strong, Rowan (2002). Episcopalianism in Nineteenth-Century Scotland: Religious Responses to a Modernizing Society. Oxford University Press. ISBN 978-0-1992-4922-0.
- Stuart, Charles Edward (28 April 1746), Letter from Prince Charles Edward Stuart to the Scottish Chiefs, justifying his reasons for leaving Scotland after the Battle of Culloden (letter), RA SP/MAIN/273/117
- Szechi, Daniel (1994). The Jacobites: Britain and Europe, 1688–1788 (First ed.). Manchester University Press. ISBN 978-0-7190-3774-0.
- Szechi, Daniel; Sankey, Margaret (2001). "Elite Culture and the Decline of Scottish Jacobitism 1716–1745". Past & Present (173): 90–128. doi:10.1093/past/173.1.90. JSTOR 3600841.
- Wemyss, Alice (2003). Gibson, John Sibbald (ed.). Elcho of the '45. Saltire Society. ISBN 978-0-8541-1080-3.
- Winchester, Charles, ed. (1870). Memoirs of the Chevalier de Johnstone, v. I. D. Wylie.
- Zimmerman, Doron (2003). The Jacobite Movement in Scotland and in Exile, 1749–1759. Palgrave Macmillan. ISBN 978-1-4039-1291-6.
