= Derf =

Derf is a nickname. Notable people with the nickname include:

- Derf Backderf or John Backderf (born 1959), American cartoonist
- Derf Scratch (1951–2010), American musician, bass guitarist, former member of the punk rock band Fear

== See also ==
- Derfel (disambiguation)
- Dern
