= Doern =

Doern is a surname. Notable people with the surname include:

- George Philip Doern (1829–1878), American newspaperman
- Russell Doern (1935–1987), Canadian politician

== See also ==
- Dern
- Dorn
