= Owen Davies (Baptist minister) =

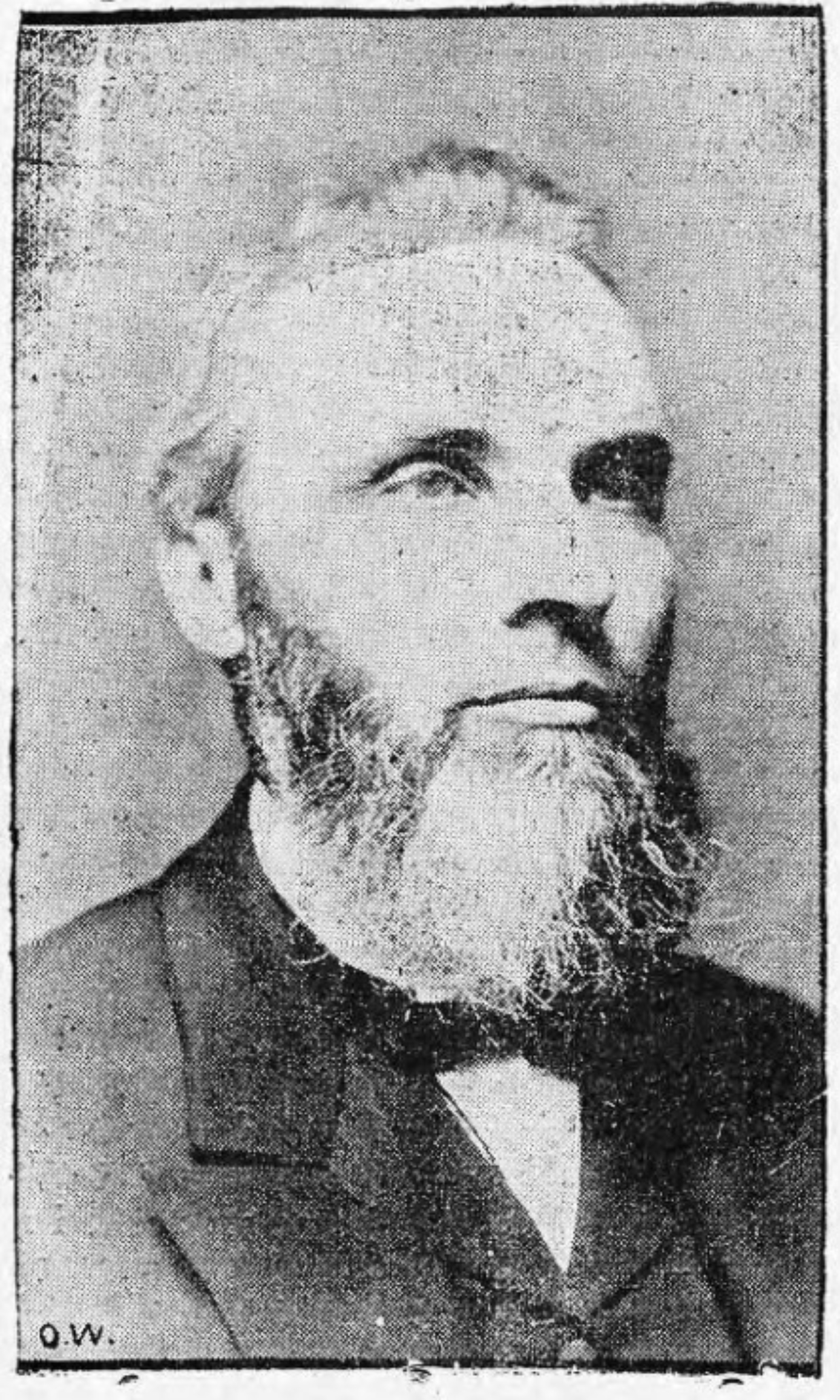
Owen Davies (Caernarfon)

Owen Davies (1840 – 30 May 1929) was a Welsh Baptist minister and writer.

== Biography ==
Davies was born at Cae Plan, a farm near Pwllheli, and attended local schools in Llanystumdwy and Yoke House, Pwllheli. Upon completing his education he worked for a period as a draper's apprentice in Pwllheli, and at the age of 18 he started working in a draper's shop in St Asaph. While living in St Asaph he began attending a local Baptist church, becoming a preacher. In 1862 he entered the new Baptist College at Llangollen. Upon completing his training, he was appointed pastor at Holywell (1865), before moving to Llangollen (1867), and Caernarfon (1876). He was also (from 1892 to 1895) a secretary to the North Wales Baptist College, Bangor, and (from 1895 to 1915) a lecturer on Homiletics and Pastoral Theology on the college staff. His written works include several books, including a number of Welsh biographies, of John Pritchard (1880), Christmas Evans (1898), Robert Jones, Llanllyfni (1903), and a history of the Welsh Baptists (1905). He was also for a time editor of Yr Athraw, and of Y Greal (from 1871 to 1918).
