= Galore Park =

Educational resource publisher

- Parent company: Hodder Education
- Founded: 1999
- Founder: Nicholas Oulton
- Country of origin: United States
- Headquarters location: London
- Publication types: books
- Official website: www.galorepark.co.uk

Galore Park is a specialist publisher of 11+ and 13+ educational resources for pupils at independent schools in the United Kingdom. Founded by former Classics teacher Nicholas Oulton in 1999, Galore Park was acquired by Hodder Education in April 2013. Galore Park is also the publisher of H E Marshall's Our Island Story, cited by David Cameron as being his favourite childhood book. Galore Park is based in London, England.

== History ==
Galore Park was founded by Nicholas Oulton when, as a Classics teacher, he wrote his own Latin course, establishing the So You Really Want to Learn Latin series. The series, aimed at 10–13 year olds, has grown to include Maths, Science, English, Spanish, French, Geography and History courses.

Winner of the IPG Educational Publisher award in 2009, Galore Park's extensive range includes ISEB Revision Guides, Practice Exercise books, Junior textbooks (for 7–11 year olds), Common Entrance textbooks (for 11-13 year olds), A* GCSE/ International GCSE Study Guides and online revision aid GOPrep, providing Maths and Science practice at 13+. Galore Park is the exclusive distributor of ISEB Common Entrance papers for 11+, 13+ and Scholarship exams and supplies these to both schools and parents.

The majority of Galore Park's textbooks are approved by the Independent Schools Examinations Board (ISEB) and are generally geared towards pupils preparing for the Common Entrance Examination and other entrance exams into independent schools at 11+ and 13+, including the Common Academic Scholarship Exam (CASE).

Galore Park is the sole distributor of ISEB Common Entrance past papers.
