= Derfel (surname) =

Derfel is an Alsatian surname. In the Alsatian dialect of Alemannic German, it is derived from "Derfel" meaning "little village". It is equally used as a Welsh surname and first name, meaning "great" or "mighty". Notable people with this surname include:

- Robert Jones Derfel (1824-1905), a Welsh poet and political writer
- Saint Derfel, also known as Derfel Gadarn, a 6th-century Celtic monk
