= Greal (Llangollen) =

19th-century Welsh periodical

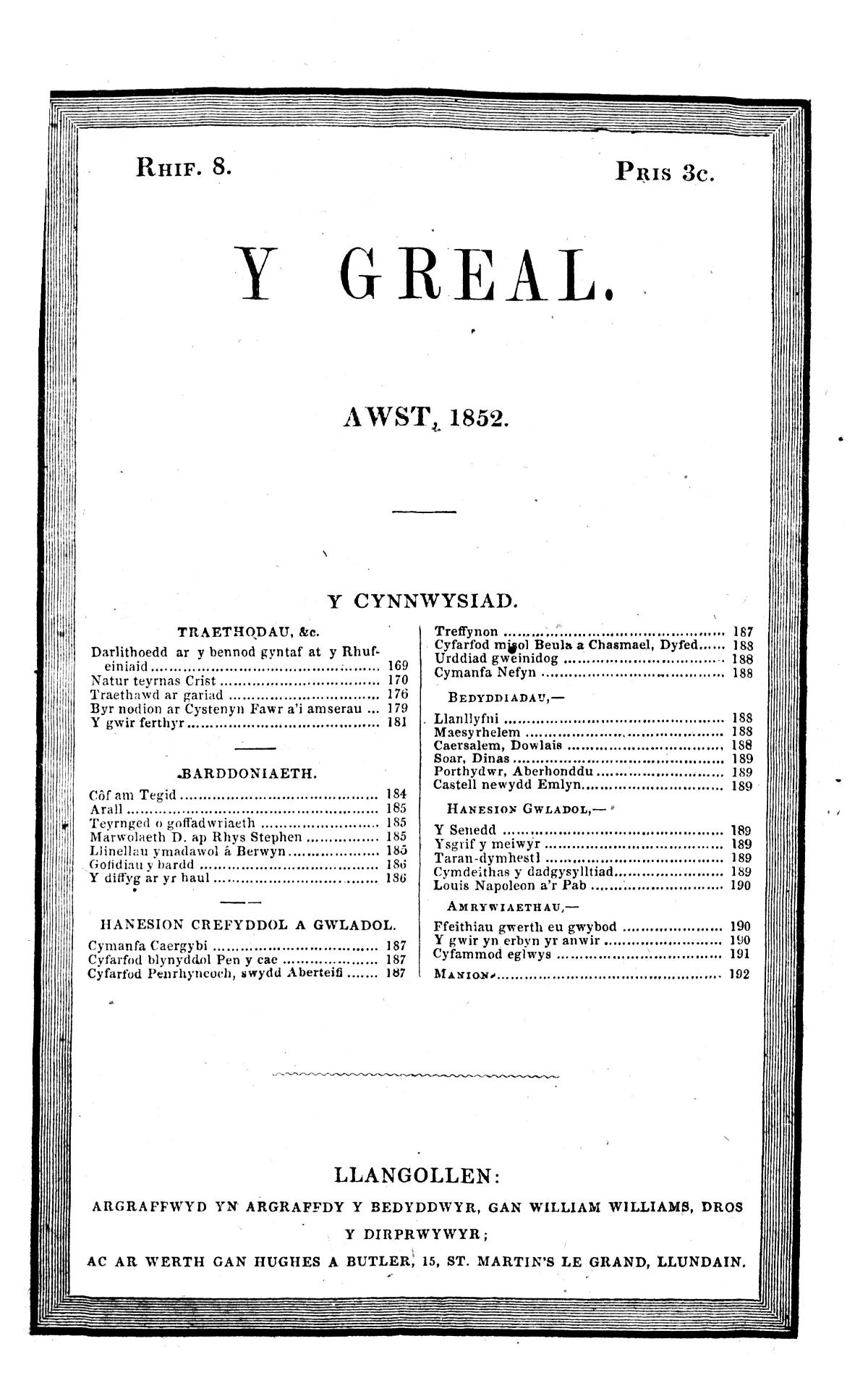
Greal (Llangollen) (Welsh Journal)

The Greal (Llangollen) was a 19th-century Welsh-language periodical, first published by William Williams in Llangollen in 1852. Its editors included Baptist minister John Jones (Mathetes, 1821-1878), minister Abel Jones Parry (1833-1911) and minister Owen Davies (1840-1929). Its articles were aimed at members of the Baptist Church congregations. Many popular Welsh musicians and poets of the 19th Century, such as John Owen published regularly in this popular periodical.
