= Our Island Story =

1905 book by Henrietta Elizabeth Marshall

- Author: H. E. Marshall
- Illustrator: A. S. Forrest
- Cover artist: A. S. Forrest
- Language: English
- Subject: History
- Genre: Reference
- Publisher: Civitas/Galore Park
- Publication date: 1905
- Publication place: United Kingdom
- Media type: Print (hardback)
- Pages: 512 pp
- ISBN: 1-902984-74-9
- OCLC: 63134934
- Followed by: Scotland's Story

Our Island Story: A Child's History of England, published abroad as An Island Story: A Child's History of England, is a book by the British author Henrietta Elizabeth Marshall, first published in 1905 in London by T. C. & E. C. Jack.

== Content ==
It covers the history of England from the time of the Roman occupation until Queen Victoria's death, using a mixture of traditional history and mythology to explain the story of British history in a way that is accessible to younger readers.

The book depicts the union of England and Scotland as a desirable and inevitable event, and praises rebels and the collective will of the common people in opposing tyrants, including kings like John and Charles I.

== Summary ==
Our Island Story consists of a chronological narrative history of Britain. By starting with accounts of a mythical beginning and continuing on to Queen Victoria's reign and the early twentieth century, the historical narrative also includes some elements of folklore, legend, and biography.

The mythical explanation for Britain's name are provided through the legends relating to Albion and Brutus of Troy at the start of the book. Marshall then transitions to the Roman invasions that Caesar led. Related to this, Marshall also recounts the stories of those such as Boudica, Caratacus, and Cassivellaunus, who attempted to resist Roman conquest. This is followed by explanations of the Roman rule that took place after the failed resistance, the spread of Christianity, and Saint Alban's martyrdom. Eventually, the Romans withdrew, so the narrative then pivots to describe the struggles Britons faced due to invading Saxons. At this point, Marshall introduces figures like Hengist and Horsa as well as King Arthur and Vortigern. In this way, medieval legend and historical traditions come are interwoven in the narrative.

The Anglo-Saxon period is contextualized through events such as the establishment of the English kingdoms, the Christianization of England, and the rules of sovereigns like Alfred the Great, Edgar the Peaceful, and Edward the Confessor. A big part of the narrative is dedicated to the Norman Conquest, with some focus placed on the accounts of William the Conqueror's victory during the Battle of Hastings and the changes that took place afterwards. Marshall then goes through the reigns of successive monarchs of the Plantagenet dynasty which originated several decades later. She emphasizes events such as the signing of the Magna Carta under King John, the Barons' War, the Crusades, and the conflicts which occurred with Scotland and Wales.

Then, the book transitions to the medieval period. These chapters take a look at the Hundred Years' War, the rise of heroes such as the Black Prince and Henry V, and the Wars of the Roses between the houses of Lancaster and York. Later, an overview of the Tudor period includes the narratives of Henry VII's consolidation of power, Henry VIII's break from the Roman Catholic Church, and the reigns of Edward VI and Mary I. Marshall then expands upon the Elizabethan era, focusing on overseas exploration, the defeat of the Spanish Armada, and the emergence of England as a maritime power.

Eventually, Marshall moves to the Stuart period, describing it through the following events: King James VI of Scotland becoming King James I of England, mounting tensions between the Crown and Parliament, the English Civil War, the execution of Charles I, Oliver Cromwell's New Model Army and rulership over the Commonwealth, the Restoration, and the Glorious Revolution of 1688. After that, Marshall presents the eighteenth century through a focus on Britain's commercial and imperial influence. The wars with France, Jacobite rebellions, and the American War of Independence follow.

The narrative then turns to the French Revolutionary Wars and the Napoleonic Wars, specifically focusing on military commanders such as Horatio Nelson and the Duke of Wellington. This leads to a description of Britain's win during the Battle of Waterloo and their emerging global power afterward. Building on that, Marshall describes the Industrial Revolution, political reforms, and the further expansion of the British Empire.

The focus of the final chapters shifts to the imperial growth during Queen Victoria's reign, or the Victorian era. As Marshall concludes, she reflects on Britain's empire and constitutional monarchy. Marshall adopts a positive perspective, emphasizing the political and moral progress throughout British history. There is a common theme of patriotism within the book.

== Influence and impact ==
The book inspired the parody 1066 and All That.

Prime Minister David Cameron chose Our Island Story when asked to select his favourite childhood book in October 2010:

When I was younger, I particularly enjoyed Our Island Story by Henrietta Elizabeth Marshall [...] It is written in a way that really captured my imagination and which nurtured my interest in the history of our great nation.

Richard Chartres in a lecture delivered at Gresham College mentioned his fondness for this text, relating it to an approach to English history rooted in the works of John Foxe and John Milton.
