= Naval, Shipping and Fisheries Exhibition =

1905 exhibition in London, England

Coordinates: 51.489°N 0.198°W

The Naval, Shipping and Fisheries Exhibition was a world's fair held in Earl's Court, London, in 1905. It was intended to mark the 100th anniversary of the Battle of Trafalgar, where a British fleet led by Admiral Nelson (who died in the battle) defeated a joint Franco-Spanish fleet during the Napoleonic Wars, to illustrate the marine power of Great Britain, and to provide demonstration of the British navy, mercantile marine, sea and river fishing, yachting, and more.

The president of the exhibition was the lord mayor of London at the time, Sir John Pound, 1st Baronet, and the vice president was Admiral Edmund Fremantle.

The exhibition opened on 6 May 1905 and closed on Trafalgar Day, 21 October 1905.

Trafalgar-related items included an item labelled as the quilt from Nelson's bed on board ship, a bust of Lord Nelson and Trafalgar & the Death of Nelson, a "scenic interpretation" of the battle and death of Nelson.

In addition to Trafalgar commemoration, there were naval-, shipping- and fishery-related exhibits:

- Naval related exhibits included Captain Cook's chart rule (plane table) and his cross-staff.
- Fishing displays included the opportunity to observe fishers mending nets and divers in a diving tank.
- Shipping related exhibits included an eight-foot model of the Empress Queen (which also appeared at the Glasgow and Franco-British fairs) and a village of Amerindians in which war canoes were shown. More actively there was the opportunity to take a submarine trip.

As in following Earl's Court exhibitions in the 1900s, there were also amusement rides, including a Hiram Maxim captive flying machine and a shoot-the-chutes.

== See also ==
- Human Zoo
- Trafalgar 200
