= R. J. Derfel =

Welsh poet and political writer (1824–1905)

Robert Jones Derfel
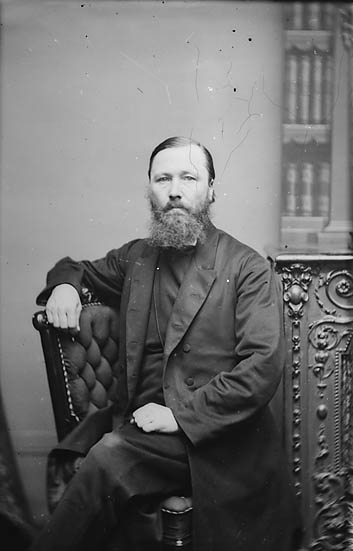
- Derfel c. 1875
- Born: Robert Jones; 24 July 1824 between Llandderfel and Bethel, Merionethshire, Wales
- Died: 16 December 1905 (aged 81); Manchester, England
- Citizenship: British

Robert Jones Derfel (24 July 1824 – 16 December 1905) was a Welsh poet and political writer.

== Early life ==
Derfel was born Robert Jones on 24 July 1824 on his grandfather's farm, between Llandderfel and Bethel in Merionethshire, Wales. At the age of 10, he ran away from home to live with his uncle near Corwen. When he was 21 years old, he started work in a factory in Llangollen, and at 21 he moved to England despite not speaking any English at all – he was a native Welsh speaker and had never learnt English as the only education he had received was at Sunday school.

== Early working life ==
In about 1850, after years without a permanent job, he found work as an odd-job man in drapery warehouses of J. F. and H. Roberts in Manchester. He soon became a travelling salesman at the Manchester firm. He was ordained in 1862, after long being a Baptist lay preacher and writing for the Baptist periodicals Y Tyst Apostolaidd and Y Greal.

== Poetry ==
As a member of the Manchester Cambrian Society, a literary society, formed by himself, John Ceiriog Hughes, William Williams (Creuddynfab), and another Welshmen, he secured several prizes at the national eisteddfodau for his poems in the classical metres. He had adopted Derfel as his bardic name after Llandderfel, a village near his home, and as by the 1860s he had become so well known by it, he adopted it as his formal surname.

Although Derfel wrote much of his early poetry about general subjects, such as religion and nature, he did venture into the area of patriotism too, including a poem about Kossuth, a Hungarian nationalist, in his first volume of poetry in 1853.

== Politics and nationalism ==
Seven years after the publication of the 1847 Reports of the Commissioners of Inquiry into the state of education in Wales, he published his 1854 play – Brad y Llyfrau Gleision (The Treason of the Blue Books). In the play he satirised the commission for their derogatory attacks on many aspects of Welsh life including its culture and religion. The play contributed to the ill-feeling that the Welsh people had towards the aspersions cast in the reports, and its name moved into the lexicon of the nation as a substitute for the name of the 1847 reports. In the 1860s, he continued to include national pride and implied condemnation of those who had given evidence to the 1847 commission as themes in his poetry.

Derfel also used the medium of essays to expound his views on a Welsh nation. In his 1864 work, Traethodau ac Areithiau (Essays and Discourses), he proffered the notion of a Welsh-language education system comprising schools and universities and the foundation of a national library, museum, school of arts and crafts, observatory, and a daily Welsh-language newspaper.

== Later life ==
His political views were heavily influenced by the utopian socialist, Robert Owen, and he wrote the first articles on Socialism in the Welsh language, campaigning for causes such as a university for Wales. In 1865, he gave up religion and bought a bookshop in Manchester, which soon collapsed. In his later years, he wrote more in the English language, particularly on the subject of socialism, and he wrote annotated English poems on Llywelyn the Last, among others.

Derfel published a total of about 800 poems in Welsh, 500 in English, and more than 50 other publications. He died aged 81 on 16 December 1905 in Manchester and was cremated there the same month.

== Works ==
- Brad y Llyfrau Gleision (The Treason of the Blue Books) (1854)
- Traethodau ac Areithiau (Essays and Discourses) (1864)
