= Scotland's Story =

1906 book by Henrietta Elizabeth Marshall

Scotland's Story: A History of Scotland for Boys and Girls
- Author: H. E. Marshall
- Illustrator: J. R. Skelton, John Hassall, and J. Shaw Crompton
- Language: English
- Subject: History
- Genre: Reference
- Publisher: Thomas Nelson and Sons Ltd.
- Publication date: 1906
- Publication place: United Kingdom
- Media type: Print (hardback)
- Pages: 428 pp
- Preceded by: Our Island Story
- Followed by: Stories of Guy of Warwick Told to the Children

Scotland's Story is a book by Henrietta Elizabeth Marshall first published in 1906 in the United Kingdom and in 1910 in the United States. It was reissued in 2005. It is about the history of Scotland, and it also has some legends having to do with Scotland. The book has been described by historian Richard J. Finlay as "replete with... imperial iconography".

Scotland's Story starts off with the legend of Prince Gathelus, and it ends with King George IV. It ended here because as Marshall says in the book "And here I think I must end, for Scotland has no more a story of her own – her story is Britain's story."

Some of the stories this book includes are those of Macbeth, William Wallace, Robert the Bruce, and the Stewart kings, but there are many more.

The book's depiction of William Wallace, which describes him as paving the way for the union of Scotland with England, has been described as a "romanticised illustration" not "based on any idea of historical reality".
