= Dern =

Dern is the surname of the following people:

- Bruce Dern (born 1936), American actor
- Daisy Dern, American country music artist
- Georg Dern (1901–?), German sports shooter
- George Dern (1872–1936), American politician, mining man, and businessman
- Harry Dern (1929–2009), Australian rules footballer
- Laura Dern (born 1967), American actress
- Mackenzie Dern (born 1993), American mixed martial artist
- Nate Dern (born 1984), American writer and actor
- Peggy Dern (1896–1966), American author
