= Henrietta Elizabeth Marshall =

British author of popular history for children (1867–1941)

Henrietta Elizabeth Marshall (usually credited as H. E. Marshall; 9 August 1867 – 19 September 1941) was a Scottish writer, particularly well known for her works of popular national history for children. She is best known for her 1905 work Our Island Story, which was published abroad as An Island Story: A Child's History Of England.

== Life ==
She was born in Bo'ness in West Lothian, Scotland, and her father was John Marshall, JP, an earthenware manufacturer.

She was educated at a girls' boarding school called Laurel Bank, in Melrose.

Between 1901 and 1904 she was the superintendent of a hall of residence for female students at the University of Glasgow, but, otherwise, she appears to have made her living throughout her life by writing. She never married.

As is made clear by the Prefaces of her books from time to time, she travelled extensively after 1904, including to Melbourne, California and China, although her obituary in The Times stated that she spent most of her life in Oxford and in London, where she died.

== Our Island Story ==
H. E. Marshall is famous for the aforementioned 1905 children's history of England, Our Island Story, illustrated by A. S. Forrest. In the USA the book was entitled An Island Story: A Child's History of England. The book was a bestseller, was printed in numerous editions, and for fifty years was the standard and much-loved book by which children learned the history of England. The narrative is a chronological one, containing a large amount of myth and legend, as well as history. In the preface (entitled 'How this book came to be written') Marshall states: 'I must tell you, though, that this is not a history lesson, but a story-book'.

The book went out of print in the 1960s, but in 2005, an alliance of the Civitas think-tank and various national newspapers reprinted it, with the aim of sending a free copy to each of the UK's primary schools. Readers of The Daily Telegraph contributed £25,000 to the cost of the reprint. In 2010, then British Prime Minister David Cameron cited Our Island Story as his favourite childhood book.

== Bibliography ==
- Our Island Story: A History of England for Boys and Girls (1905)
- Scotland's Story: A History of Scotland for Boys and Girls (1906)
- Beowulf: Translations (1908)
- Our Empire Story (1908)
- Canada's Story from the Our Empire Story series
- India's Story from the Our Empire Story series
- Australasia's Story from the Our Empire Story series
- South Africa's Story from the Our Empire Story series
- Stories of Roland told to the Children (1907)
- Through Europe and Egypt with Napoleon (1908)
- English Literature for Boys and Girls (1909)
- A History of France (1912)
- Stories of Robin Hood told to the Children (1912)
- A History of Germany (1913)
- This Country of Ours (1917) – the American title of the book, which was published in the United Kingdom as The Story of the United States (1919)
- Kings and Things (1937)

== Copyright status ==
Her works entered the public domain in Australia on 1 January 1992, after 50 full years from her death, per the Berne Convention on copyright. Her works are also in the public domain in Europe as of January 2012, per European Union copyright law (1993 Term Directive).
