= Loch an Nostarie =

Freshwater loch

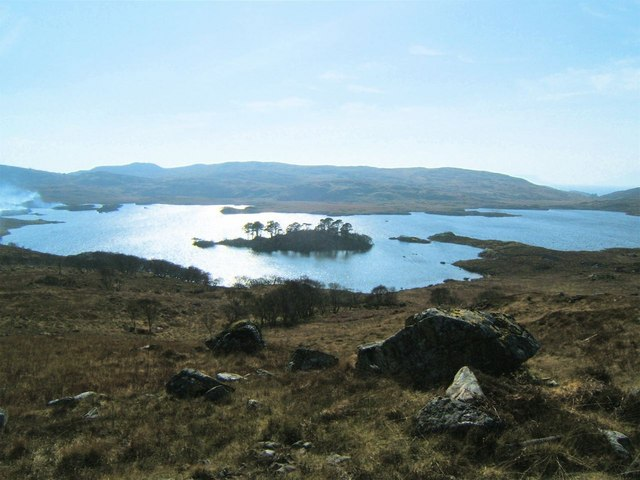
- View over Loch an Nostarie

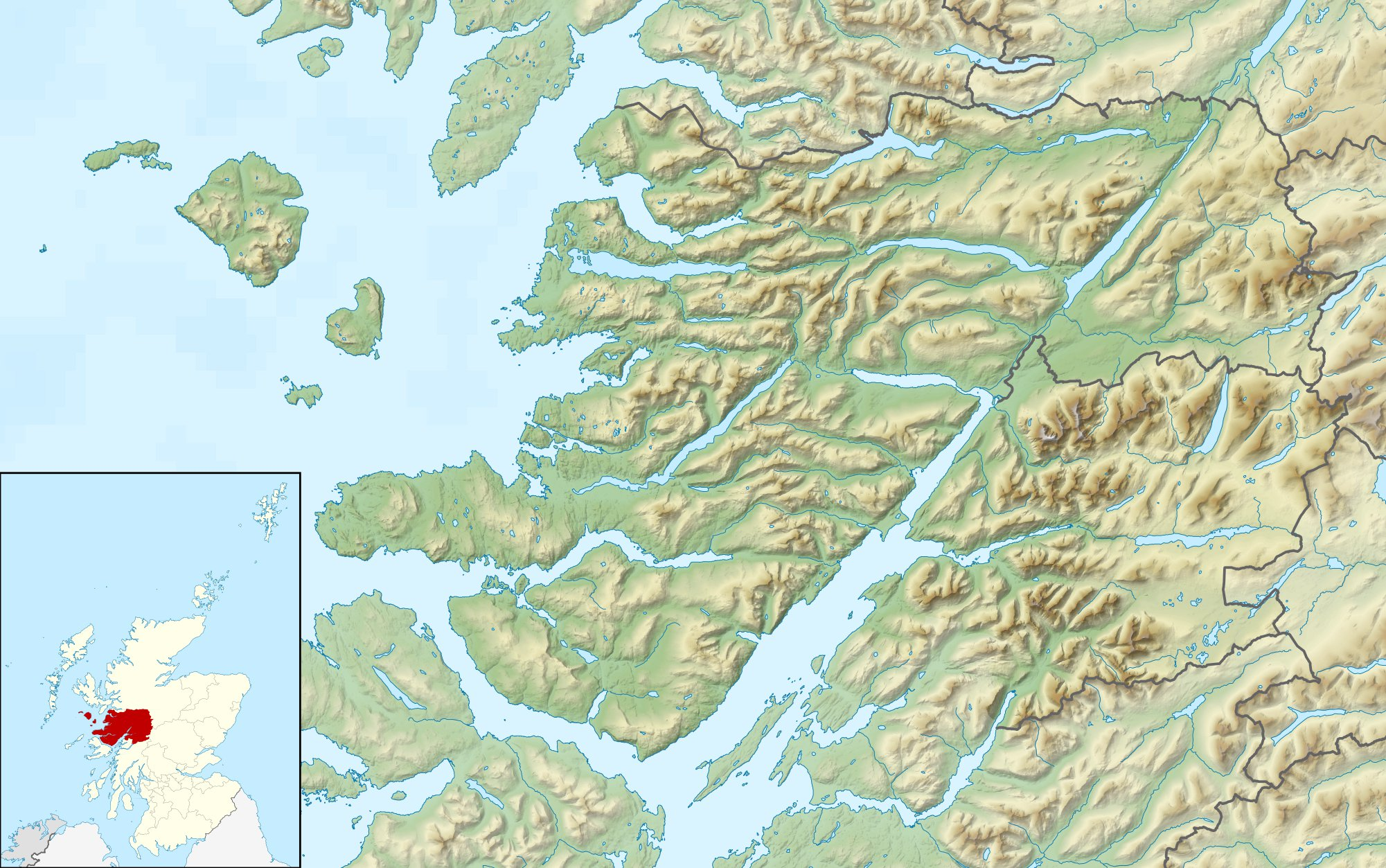
- Location in Lochaber
- Location: NM69099535
- Coordinates: 56.9928°N 5.8024°W
- Type: freshwater loch
- Max. length: 0.8 km (0.50 mi)
- Max. width: 0.8 km (0.50 mi)
- Surface area: 45 ha (110 acres)
- Average depth: 10.8 ft (3.3 m)
- Max. depth: 10.1 ft (3.1 m)
- Water volume: 1,518,110 m^{3} (53,612,000 ft^{3})
- Shore length^{1}: 6 km (3.7 mi)
- Surface elevation: 24 m (79 ft)
- Islands: 9
- ^{1} Shore length is not a well-defined measure.

Loch an Nostarie is an irregular shaped shallow freshwater loch that lies about a mile north of the west-end of Loch Morar and about a mile south-east of Mallaig in the Lochaber district of Scotland. Loch an Nostarie drains through the little lochan Loch a' Mheadhoin through lochan Loch a' Bhada Dharaich (Loch of the Oak thicket) flowing south along Allt an Lóin stream into Loch Morar. Directly to the south of the loch is Loch a' Ghille Ghobaich.

== Walking ==
There is extensive walking routes that take in Loch an Nostarie, which is part of the Loch an Nostarie circuit.
