= Morar Railway Viaduct =

Bridge in Highlands, Scotland

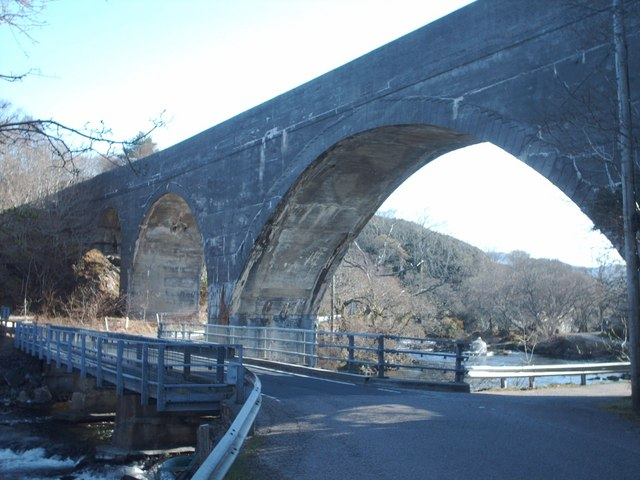
- Coordinates: 56.9629°N 5.8159°W
- Carries: West Highland Line
- Crosses: River Morar

Characteristics
- Material: Concrete
- No. of spans: 3

History
- Construction start: 1897
- Opened: 1901

Listed Building – Category B
- Official name: Morar, Falls Of Morar Railway Viaduct Over River Morar
- Designated: 4 October 1971
- Reference no.: LB296

Location
- Interactive map of Morar Railway Viaduct

The Morar Railway Viaduct is a railway viaduct that carries the West Highland Line over the River Morar.

== History ==
The West Highland Railway was built to Fort William by Lucas and Aird, but there were delays with the West Highland Railway Mallaig Extension (Guarantee) bill for the Mallaig Extension Railway in the House of Commons as the Tory and Liberal parties fought over the issue of subsidies for public transport. This Act did pass in 1896, by which time Lucas and Aird (and their workers) had moved south. New contractors were needed and Robert McAlpine & Sons were taken on with Simpson & Wilson as engineers. Robert McAlpine & Sons was headed by Robert McAlpine, nicknamed "Concrete Bob" for his innovative use of mass concrete. Concrete was used due to the difficulty of working the hard schist in the area. McAlpine's son Robert, then aged 28, took charge of construction, with his younger son Malcolm appointed as assistant.

Construction of the extension from Fort William to Mallaig began in January 1897, and the line opened on 1 April 1901. The Morar Railway Viaduct is a Category B listed building.

== Design ==
The viaduct carries the northern extent of the West Highland Line over the River Morar, a short river linking Loch Morar to the sea.

It has three arches of rusticated concrete, and carries a single track of railway. The B8008 public road and the river go through the larger middle arch, which is of 90 feet (27 m) span, and an unmarked road through the south arch.

== See also ==
- List of bridges in Scotland
