= Loch Beoraid =

Freshwater loch

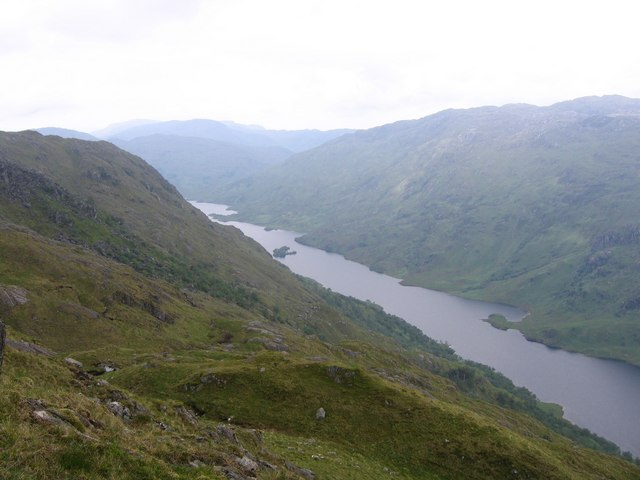
- Rock fall overlooking Loch Beoraid

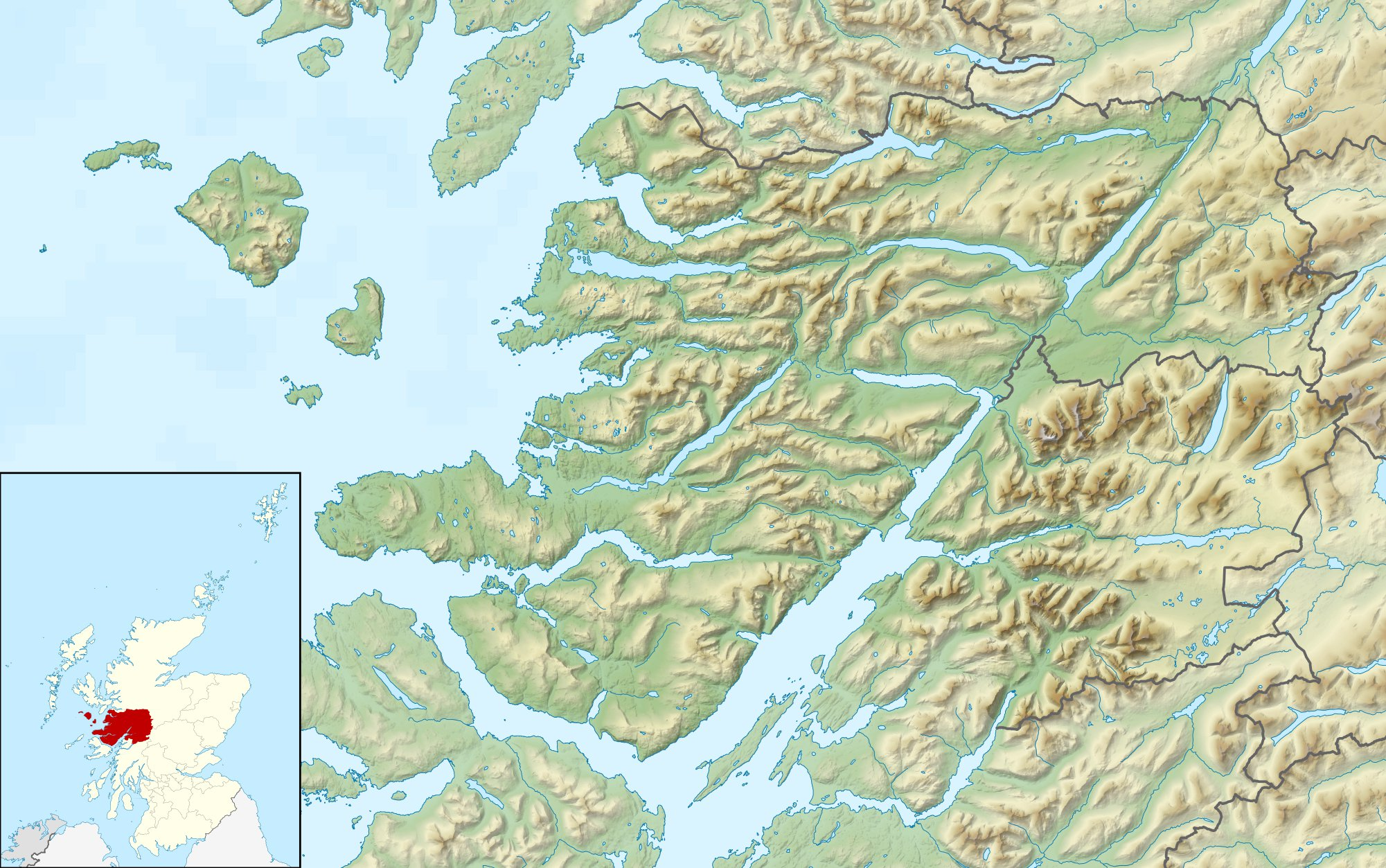
- Location in Lochaber
- Location: NM83768507
- Coordinates: 56.9063°N 5.6°W
- Type: freshwater loch
- Primary inflows: Allt a' Choire
- Primary outflows: River Meoble into Loch Morar
- Max. length: 2.4 km (1.5 mi)
- Max. width: 1.2 km (0.75 mi)
- Surface area: 158 ha (390 acres)
- Average depth: 72 ft (22 m)
- Max. depth: 159.5 ft (48.6 m)
- Water volume: 1,228,717,183.85 ft^{3} (34,793,396.000 m^{3})
- Shore length^{1}: 14 km (8.7 mi)
- Surface elevation: 52 m (171 ft)
- Max. temperature: 54.8 °F (12.7 °C)
- Min. temperature: 50.8 °F (10.4 °C)
- ^{1} Shore length is not a well-defined measure.

Loch Beoraid is a long linear narrow and deepwater freshwater loch, orientated on west to east axis, that is located 8.5 miles east of Arisaig, in South Morar in the Lochaber district of Scotland.

== Geography ==
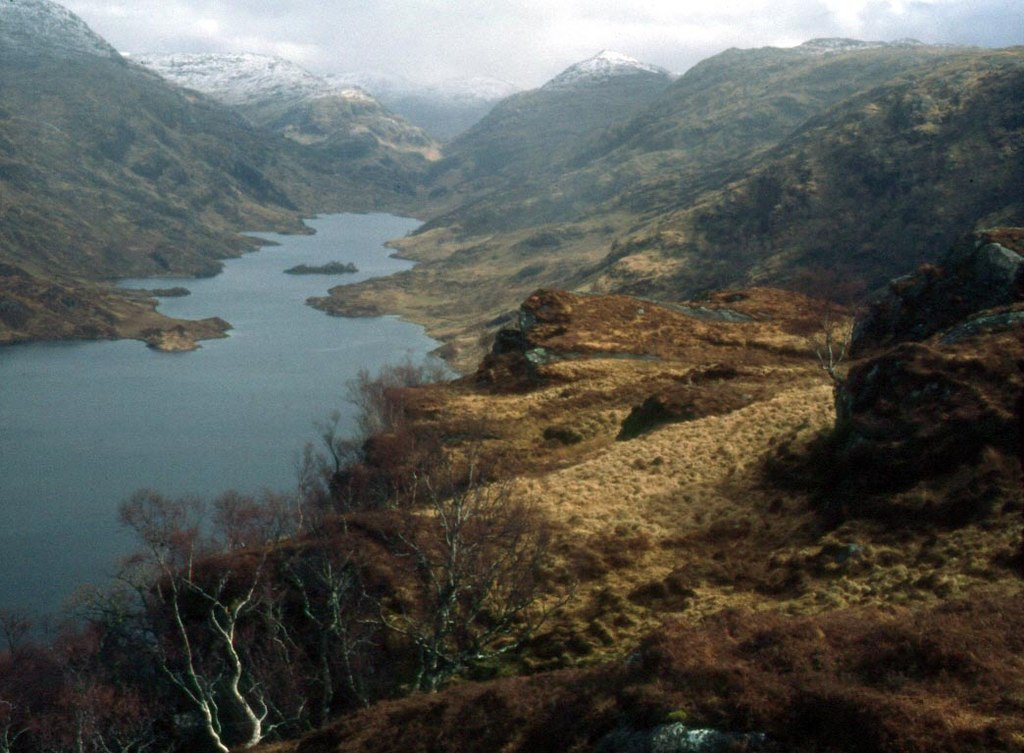
One of Prince Charlie's caves lies below this shelf

The loch is bounded by the extensive Meith Bheinn plateau to the north, that contain many small peaks with the highest at the east end being Sgùrr na Plaide at 454m. Further north is the imposing bulk of Loch Morar To the south lies the long flat boggy plateau the peak of Glas-charn at 633m, at the east end that separates Loch Beoraid from Loch Eilt which lies on a similar orientation and is almost the same length as Loch Beoraid. At the west of the loch lies Prince Charlie's Cave, one of many where Charles Edward Stuart was said to have sheltered when on the run from the Duke of Cumberland, after the defeat at the Battle of Culloden.
