= River Morar =

River and power station in Scotland

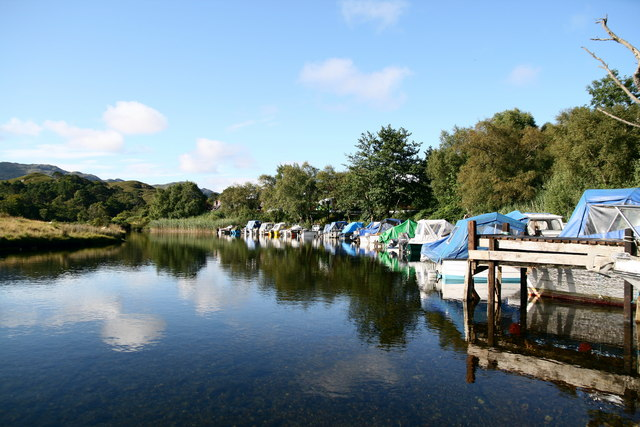
- Moorings on the upper section of the river

- Location of the mouth within Scottish Highlands

Location
- Country: Scotland

Physical characteristics
- Source
  - location: Loch Morar
  - coordinates: 56.9669°N 5.8093°W
- Mouth
  - location: Morar Bay
  - coordinates: 56.9700°N 5.8372°W

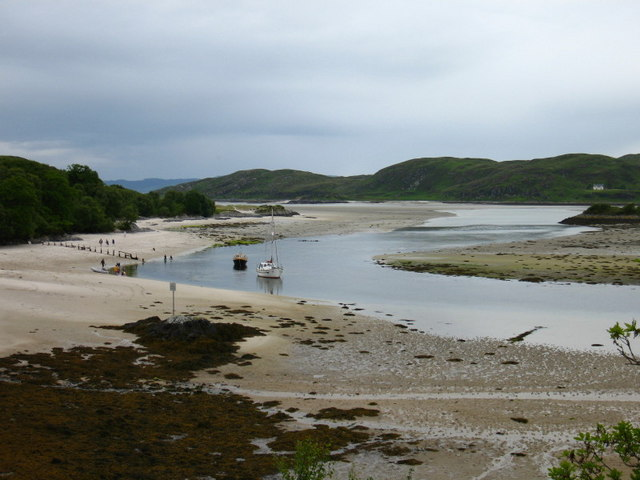
Estuary of Morar Bay

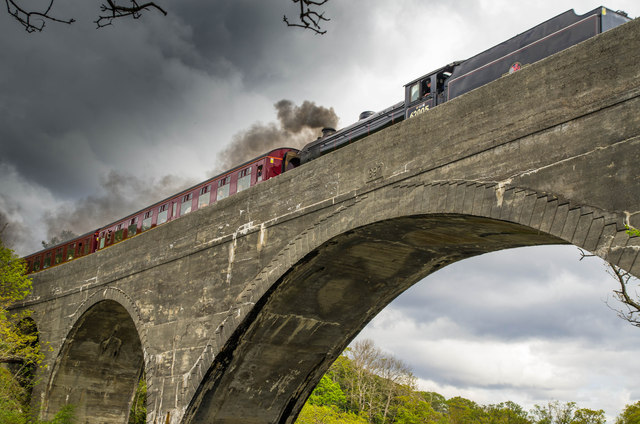
Steam train crossing the railway viaduct

The River Morar is a river that flows from Loch Morar in the west Highlands of Scotland. It flows from the western end of the loch to the estuary of Morar Bay, an inlet of the Sound of Sleat. It is one of Scotland's shortest rivers, and is known for its white sands beaches where it flows through Morar Bay.

The river is crossed by three bridges, and is the site of a hydro-electric power station, built as part of the first constructional scheme promoted by the newly formed North of Scotland Hydro-Electric Board, to demonstrate its commitment to supplying the remote areas of Scotland with electricity. It was commissioned in 1948.

== Course ==
The course of the River Morar is about 0.5 miles (0.8 km) long from Loch Morar to below the bridge carrying the A830 trunk road, and is one of the shortest rivers in Scotland. However, when the tide is out, it flows in a single channel across the sands of Morar Bay, for another 1.5 miles (2.4 km), and this section is labelled River Morar by the Ordnance Survey. The surface level of Loch Morar is 46 feet (14 m) above Ordnance datum (AOD), and the river descends through this height to reach the sea at the Sound of Sleet.

At the top end of the river, there are a series of jetties on the right bank, which provide moorings for boats using the loch. The river heads south, and then turns to the west. A weir and sluice control the flow to the hydroelectric station on the left bank. The river then tumbles down a rocky section, known as the Falls of Morar, although the flow down the falls is considerably less than it was before the hydroelectric plant was built. The power station discharges its water back into the river below the main part of the falls, and a fish ladder allows salmon and trout to negotiate the rise to reach Loch Morar.

The river is crossed by three bridges, the upper most of which is a railway viaduct built by the West Highland Railway which opened its route from Banavie to Mallaig in 1901. The viaduct consists of four arches, is made of massed concrete, and was completed in 1897. It now carries the West Highland Line and is a Category B listed building. The main arch spanning the river is 90 feet (27 m), a second smaller arch carries the railway over the road on the north side of the river, and there are arches at both ends which are smaller still. The second bridge carries the B8008 road which runs through the village of Morar. It was formerly part of the main road from Fort William to Mallaig. The present bridge is close to the railway viaduct, and is built of stone. Prior to 1915, the road bridge was a little further downstream, but was replaced at some point. The newer bridge is the normal upstream limit to which tides flow. The third bridge carries the A830 road, and was constructed in 1997 when the road was upgraded. It bypasses the village altogether.

Below the road bridge, the river channel is flanked by white sandy beaches at low tide, known as the Silver Sands of Morar. The River Morar forms the boundary between the parishes of Glenelg, to the north, and Arisaig and Moidart, to the south.

== Falls of Morar ==
As the River Morar crosses over the rock bar at the end of the loch it forms a series of waterfalls known as the Falls of Morar.

== Hydroelectric power station ==
A 750 kW hydroelectric power station with a hydraulic head of 16 feet (4.9 m) was built on the River Morar in 1948.

The North of Scotland Hydro-Electric Board was created as a result of the Hydro-electric Development (Scotland) Act 1943, an Act championed by the politician Tom Johnston during his time as Secretary of State for Scotland. Johnston's vision was for a public body that could build hydro-electric stations throughout the Highlands. Profits made by selling bulk electricity to the Scottish lowlands would be used to fund "the economic development and social improvement of the North of Scotland." Private consumers would be offered a supply of cheap electricity, and their connection to that supply would not reflect the actual cost of its provision in remote and sparsely populated areas.

Lord Airlie, who had initially been critical of the 1943 Act because its scope was too limited, was the first chairman of the new Board. Edward MacColl, an engineer with wide experience of hydro-electric projects and electrical distribution networks, was deputy chairman and chief executive. It soon became clear that MacColl intended to push ahead with the aspirations of the Act at breakneck speeds. He produced a list of 102 potential sites in just three months, and in June 1944, the first constructional scheme was published. This was for the Loch Sloy scheme, which had a ready market for bulk supplies to nearby Clydeside, but it included two smaller schemes, to demonstrate the Board's commitment to supplying remote areas. These were at Morar and Kyle of Lochalsh. The estimated cost of the two smaller schemes was £0.5 million, compared to £4.1 million for the Sloy development. Although there were no objections to the two smaller schemes, implementation was delayed, because there was vigorous opposition to the Sloy scheme, and a public inquiry was held to consider this. John Cameron KC decided that the objectors had failed to convince him that the scheme was not in the public interest, and the three schemes were authorised on 28 March 1945.

To mark the start of the smaller projects, pole raising ceremonies were held in May 1946 at Morar and at Nostie Bridge, where the Lochalsh station would be built. The Morar scheme would be built beside the Falls of Morar, and a token electricity pole was raised, which would become part of the distribution network for an area which would reach from Mallaig to the north down to Loch Ailort in the south. Both Tom Johnston and Edward MacColl were present, with Lady Hermione Cameron of Locheil assisting with the ceremony.

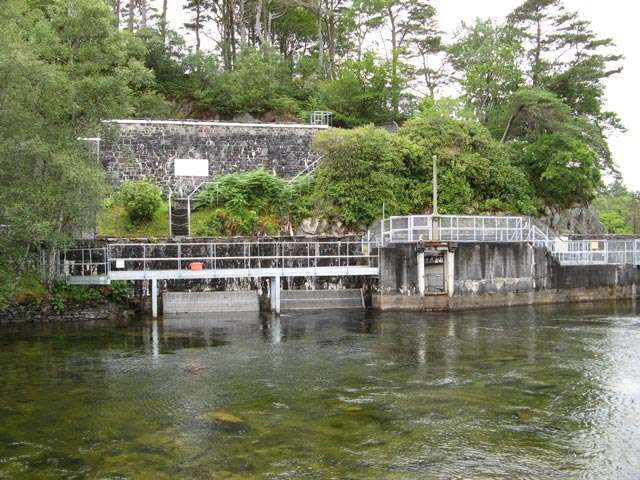
The intake sluice for the Morar hydro-electric station

The original plans for both sites were brick structures, but James Shearer, one of three members of the Panel of Architectural Advisors to the Board, who was tasked with the architectural work at Lochalsh, noticed that all local buildings were made of local stone, in a style he called cottage architecture, and asked MacColl whether stone could be used for the power station, despite its extra cost and the fact that working with stone was a dying art. MacColl readily agreed, and this formed a policy for most of the Board's projects. Wood states that Shearer was also the architect for the Morar station, but Shearer states that it was another of the Panel of Architectural Advisors, Reginald Fairlie, who designed Morar. It too was built of stone, and both stations were officially opened on 21 December 1948, becoming the first stations built by the Board to become operational. At Morar a local crofter called Mrs Catherine MacKenzie inaugurated the station, by operating a wheel to let water into the turbines. She said, in Gaelic, "Let light and power come to the crofts”. ("Gun tigeadh Solus agus Neart an dealain dhionnsuich gach crout.")

A small dam was constructed, which raised the level of Loch Morar by 3 feet (0.9 m), but because of the location of the falls, the head for the Kaplan turbines is 16 feet (4.9 m). The small change in level represents a significant increase in the volume of water stored, as the loch covers 10.36 square miles (26.83 km^{2}). The dam includes a drum gate on the spillway, which operates automatically. A fish ladder was constructed around the dam to ensure that trout and salmon could still reach Loch Morar. The power station is located in a cavern near the falls, with only the doorway and a retaining wall visible.

=== Operation ===
In 2002, the Renewables Obligation (Scotland) legislation was introduced. It was conceived as a way to promote the development of small-scale hydro-electric, wave power, tidal power, photovoltaics, wind power and biomas schemes, but by the time it came into force, the definition of small scale had been increased from 5 MW to 10 MW and then 20 MW, and existing hydro-electric stations that had been refurbished to improve efficiency could be included. Morar at 0.75 MW thus qualified, and between 2005 and 2007 the station qualified for 6,833 Renewable Obligation Certificates, generating a subsidy for SSE of over £332,000. In 2007 the station operated at an average load factor of 48.7 percent.

== Bibliography ==
- Biswas, Asit K (May 1965). "Hydroelectric developments in the Scottish Highlands" (PDF). Proceedings of the American Society of Civil Engineers.
- Dekker, Nick (2008). "Public Petition No. PE1184" (PDF). Scottish Parliament. Archived (PDF) from the original on 10 January 2024.
- Fraser, Norrie, ed. (1956). Sir Edward MacColl - A maker of modern Scotland. Edinburgh: Stanley Press.
- Miller, James (2002). The Dam Builders - Power from the Glens. Birlinn. ISBN 978-1-84158-225-2.
- Paxton, Roland; Shipway, Jim (2007). Civil Engineering Heritage - Scotland Highlands and Islands. Thomas Telford. ISBN 978-0-7277-3488-4.
- Payne, Peter L (1988). The Hydro. Aberdeen University Press. ISBN 978-0-08-036584-8.
- Swap (June 2005). "Subsidies and Subterfuge" (PDF). Scottish Wind Assessment Project. Archived (PDF) from the original on 11 October 2022.
- Wood, Emma (2002). The Hydro Boys. Luath Press. ISBN 978-1-84282-016-2.
