= Briggens House =

Country house in Hunsdon, Hertfordshire, England, UK

Coordinates: 51.7813153°N 0.042563°E

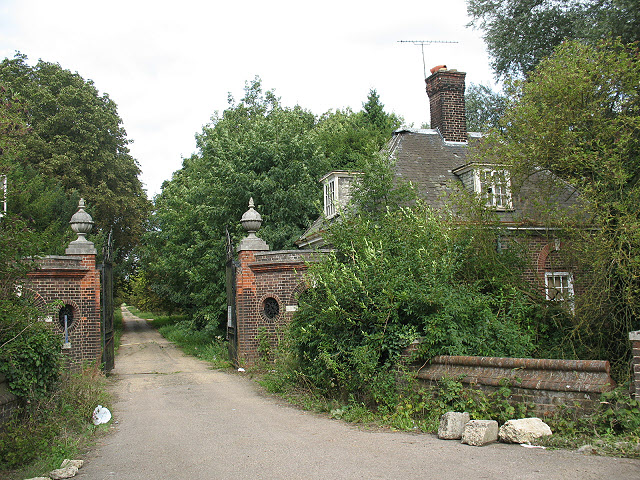
Back entrance and gate house adjacent to Roydon station

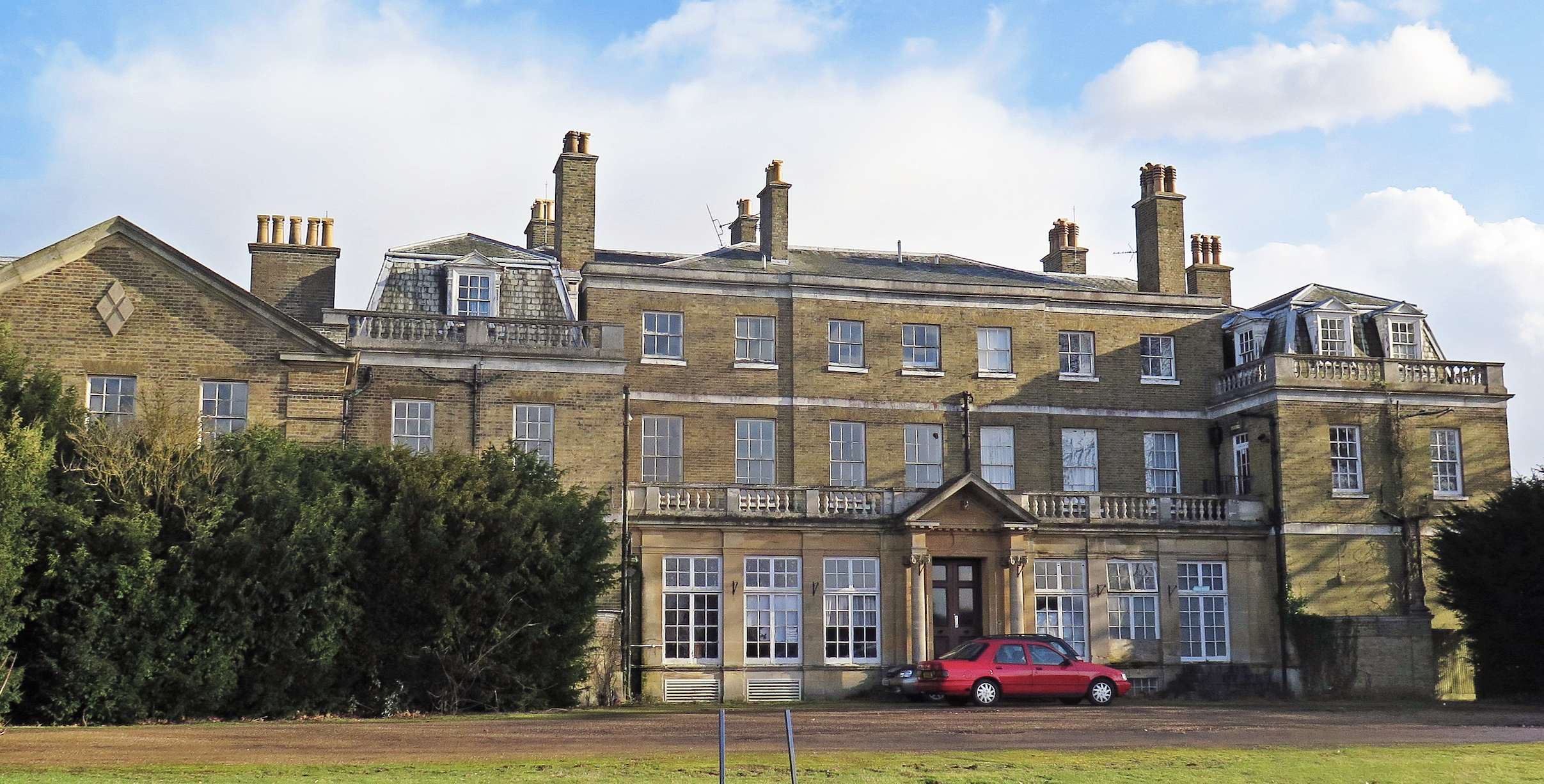
Front elevation of Briggens House

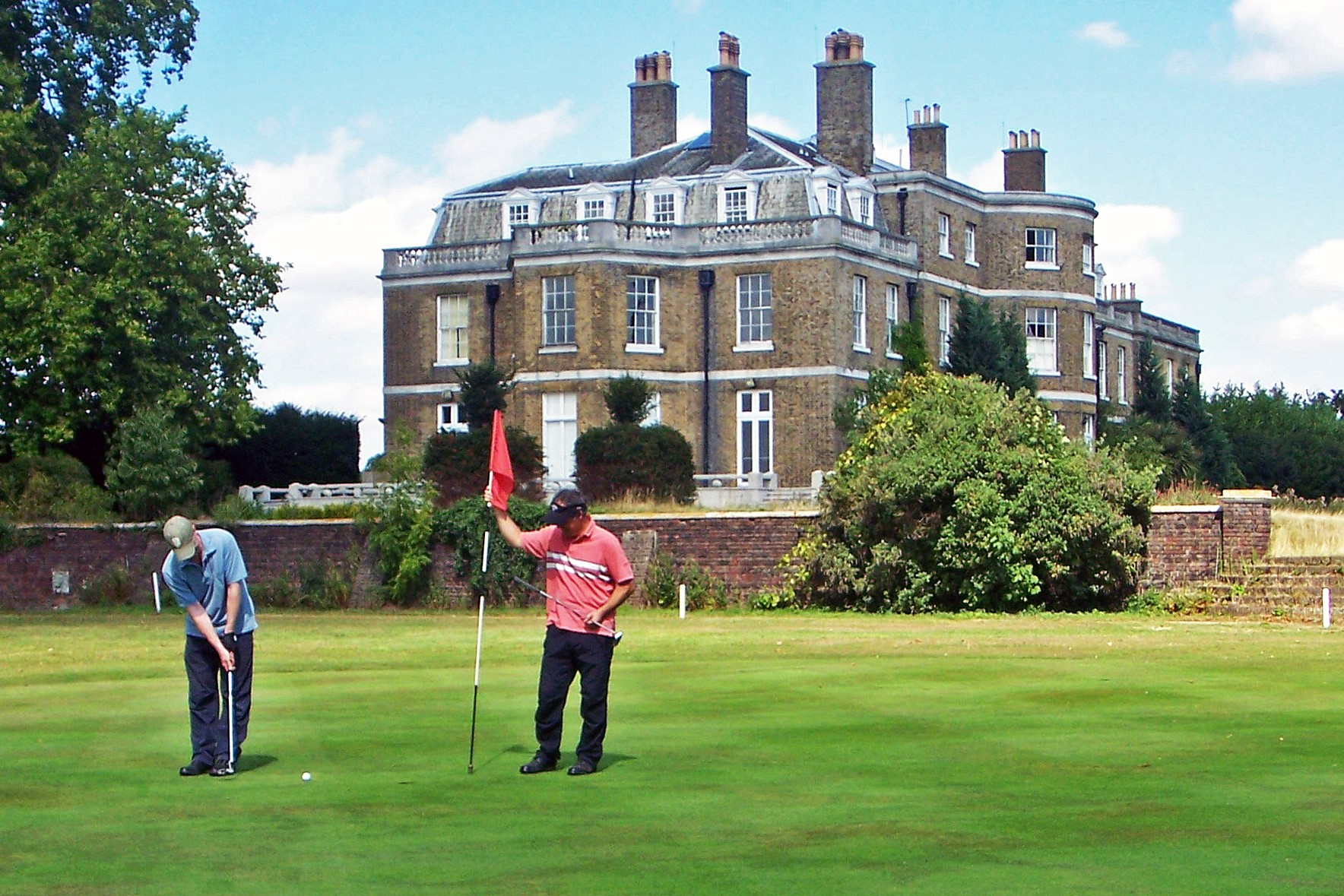
Two golf club members play the ninth and final hole with the southern aspect of Briggens House in the background. c. 2011.

Briggens House is a Grade II listed 18th-century house and parklands in Hertfordshire, England, near the border with Essex and the village of Roydon. It has a number of features from the garden designer Charles Bridgeman from 1720. There are also some remains of the pleasure gardens developed by Lord Hunsden in 1908.

== 1700-1800 ==
The house was first built and owned by Sir Thomas Foster whose descendant sold it to the Crowley family. Robert Chester, a director of the South Sea Company bought it in 1706 who made many substantial changes to the house and grounds, commissioning Charles Bridgeman to work on the gardens.

== 1940s: Special Operations Executive (Polish Section) ==
The house was owned by the 4th Baron Aldenham Walter Gibbs the Deputy Chairman of Westminster Bank. From 1941, Briggens House was used by the Special Operations Executive (SOE) as the main forgery operation to support their secret agents and undercover special forces. When the house was requisitioned by the War Office the family was allowed to stay in residence which was very rare in cases such as this.

=== STS 38 Polish Training Section ===
The house was requisitioned to train elite fighting troops known as the Cichociemni, (Silent and Unseen) selected from the Polish Home Army that had escaped to Britain. They trained in hand to hand combat, sabotage, and subversive activities, etc. Those who passed awaited their turn to be dropped back into Nazi occupied Poland wearing civilian clothing, using fake identities and forged papers. They then faced a long flight in potentially hazardous weather conditions over well defended enemy held territory, a parachute drop at night and locating a reception committee on the ground before leading and organising resistance groups against a vicious and brutal enemy. Eventually, the whole training unit was transferred to STS 43 Audley End when Station XIV - False Document Section expanded and took over the whole of Briggens House.

=== SOE – Station XIV - False Document Section ===
This section was begun by three Polish forgers in the cellar of Briggens House, and quickly expanded when SOE obtained Britain’s most experienced printers, engravers and artists. This unique group was recruited and led by Commanding Officer Captain Morton Grainger Bisset, a highly specialised printer, to provide a multitude of forged documents to enable agents with false identities to operate in occupied countries without being captured. The passports, identity cards, work permits, ration books and driving licences needed to be perfect to fool the Nazi SS and police at border and random check-points. Any small discrepancy could lead to instant arrest, interrogation, torture and ultimately a firing squad.

Documents were provided for agents such as Violette Szabo, and F. F. E. Yeo-Thomas, the 'White Rabbit'. The team included Scotland Yard handwriting and other printing experts to run an almost 'same-day delivery service' for documents, being able to copy documents and return them before they have been identified as missing. The Nazis were aware of their work. A study found that the forgers’ versions of ration cards were so good they could not easily be detected. The team also produced 43 million zloty that were dropped into occupied Poland in 1944 to disrupt the economy. By the war’s end, Briggens had produced 275,000 forged documents.

== Current ==
In 1979 the house was converted into a hotel and conference centre with a separate golf club occupying the parkland. The hotel closed its doors In 2006. In 2010 it reopened as a wedding venue but this did not have planning permission and was immediately closed down. As of November 2019 the house remains closed to the public but the golf course is still in place.

== See also ==
- List of SOE establishments
- Aston House
- The Frythe
- Forgery as covert operation
