= Inverailort House =

Mansion in Scotland

Coordinates: 56°52′16.49″N 5°40′15.26″W

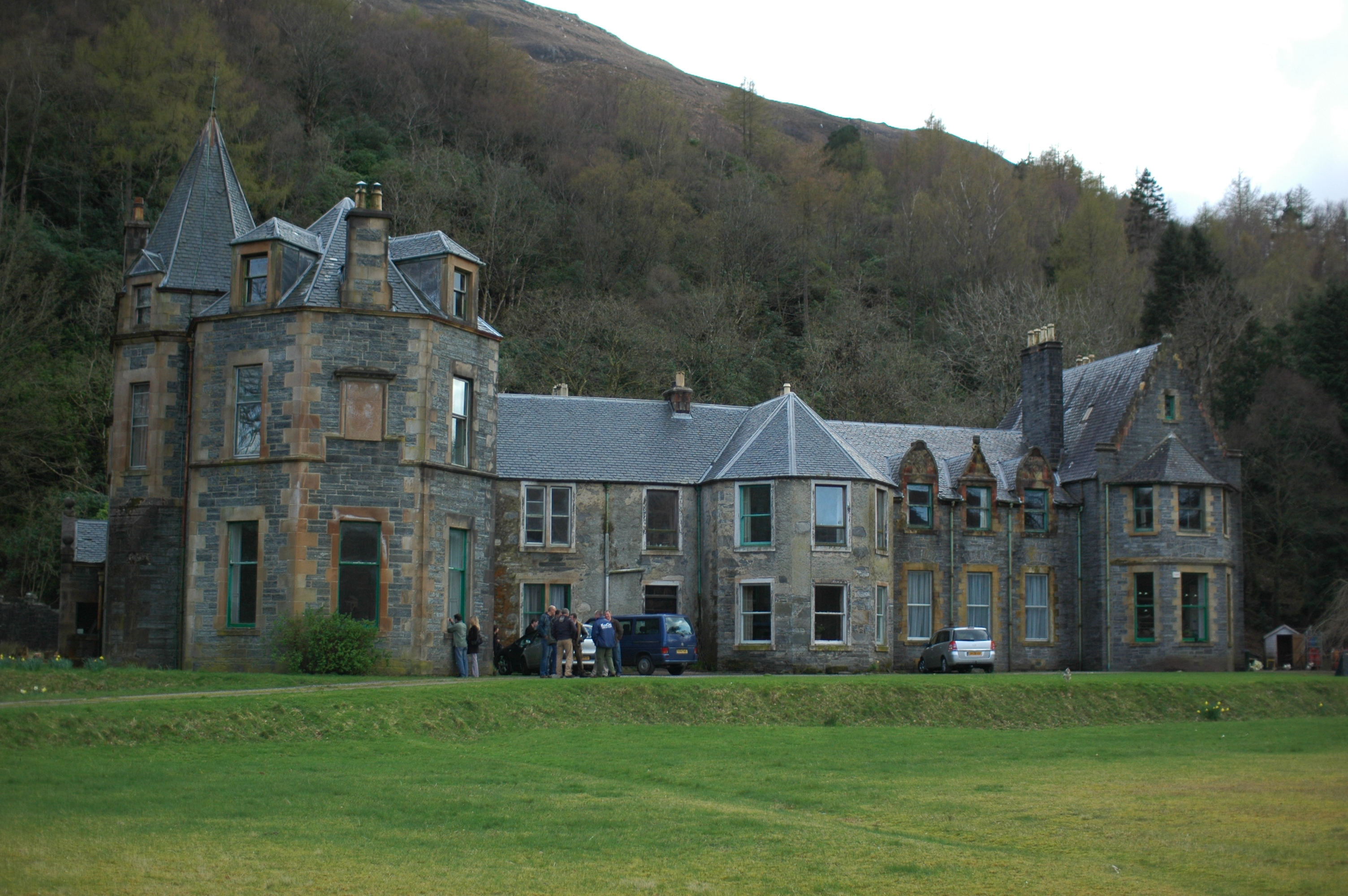
Inverailort House in 2009

Inverailort House is a mansion, south of Lochailort, at the head of Loch Ailort.

== History ==
Having been a shooting lodge for MacDonald of Clanranald, Inverailort House was enlarged in 1828 by Major General Sir Alexander Cameron. It was subsequently owned by James Head, a director of several shipping lines, who married into the Cameron family in 1890.

Francis Cameron-Head died in 1957 and his widow lived at Inverailort until her death in 1994. Her companion Barbara Mackintosh continued to live at the house until her eventual death in 2015.

In the late 19th Century Christian Cameron, the wife of James Head, was a keen photographer. She took many photographs of the house and surrounding area. Most of the glass plates were lost or destroyed when the military took over the house during World War II, but the surviving photographs have been published in a book. Christian Cameron is said to have died of a broken heart after much of the contents of the house were badly damaged by the army when they emptied it.

During the Second World War, Inverailort was requisitioned by the War Office at the end of May 1940 as one of a few mansions in the area used as the Special Training Centre for agents of the Special Operations Executive. Here British agents were taught ruthless techniques of intelligence gathering, sabotage and survival. Initially the centre was operated by MI(R) but became part of Combined Operations. Many techniques of guerilla and irregular warfare were developed there and training techniques which were adopted for Commando training. SOE training was centred on nearby Arisaig House.

The army moved out of the house on 20 August 1942 and it was then taken over by the Royal Navy, when it became HMS Lochailort and used for the training of naval cadet ratings to be officers on small craft used by Combined Operations. The Royal Navy left in January 1945.

As of today, Inverailort House is in a ruinous state.

== See also ==
- Achnacarry
- Lech-a-Vuie Platform railway station
- List of SOE establishments
- Commando Basic Training Centre (United Kingdom)
