= Bracorina =

Coordinates: 56.97°N 05.75°W

- Location within the Lochaber area
- OS grid reference: NM725927
- Council area: Highland
- Country: Scotland
- Sovereign state: United Kingdom
- Police: Scotland
- Fire: Scottish
- Ambulance: Scottish

Bracorina is a settlement in Lochaber, in the Highland council area of Scotland. It is located on the northern side of Loch Morar, 5 kilometres (3.1 mi) east of the village of Morar, at the end of a minor road. A footpath continues alongside the loch, to the remote hamlet of Tarbet.
