= Larichmore Viaduct =

Bridge in Highlands, Scotland

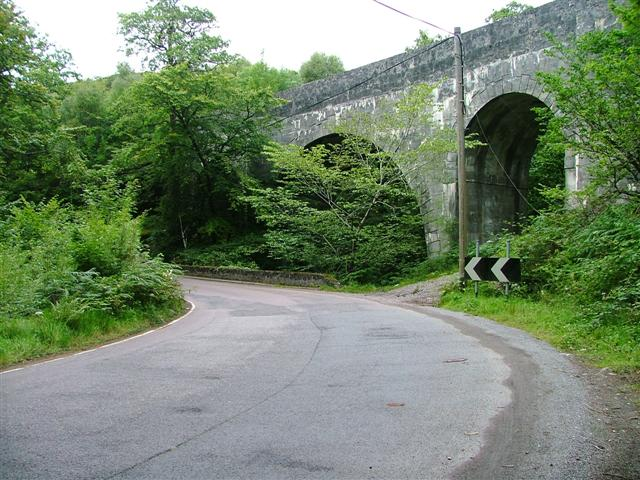
- Bridge next to the A830 road
- Coordinates: 56.9123°N 5.8216°W
- Carries: West Highland Line
- Crosses: Brunery Burn

Characteristics
- Material: Concrete
- No. of spans: 3

History
- Construction start: 1897
- Opened: 1901

Listed Building – Category B
- Official name: Larichmore Railway Viaduct Over Allt Na Laraiche Mòire
- Designated: 22 June 1980
- Reference no.: LB292

Location
- Interactive map of Larichmore Viaduct

The Larichmore Viaduct is a railway viaduct in Scotland that carries the West Highland Line over the Brunery Burn.

== History ==
The West Highland Railway was built to Fort William by Lucas and Aird, but there were delays with the West Highland Railway Mallaig Extension (Guarantee) bill for the Mallaig Extension Railway in the House of Commons as the Tory and Liberal parties fought over the issue of subsidies for public transport. This Act did pass in 1896, by which time Lucas and Aird (and their workers) had moved south. New contractors were needed and Robert McAlpine & Sons were taken on with Simpson & Wilson as engineers. Robert McAlpine & Sons was headed by Robert McAlpine, nicknamed "Concrete Bob" for his innovative use of mass concrete. Concrete was used due to the difficulty of working the hard schist in the area. McAlpine's son Robert, then aged 28, took charge of construction, with his younger son Malcolm appointed as assistant.

Construction of the extension from Fort William to Mallaig began in January 1897, and the line opened on 1 April 1901.

It was listed as a Category B listed building in 1980.

== Design ==
The viaduct crosses the Brunery Burn close to the A830 road. It has three arches, with a centre span of 50 feet (15 m), and a radius of curvature of 200 metres (660 ft).

== See also ==
- List of bridges in Scotland
