= Charles Bridgeman =

English garden designer (1690–1738)

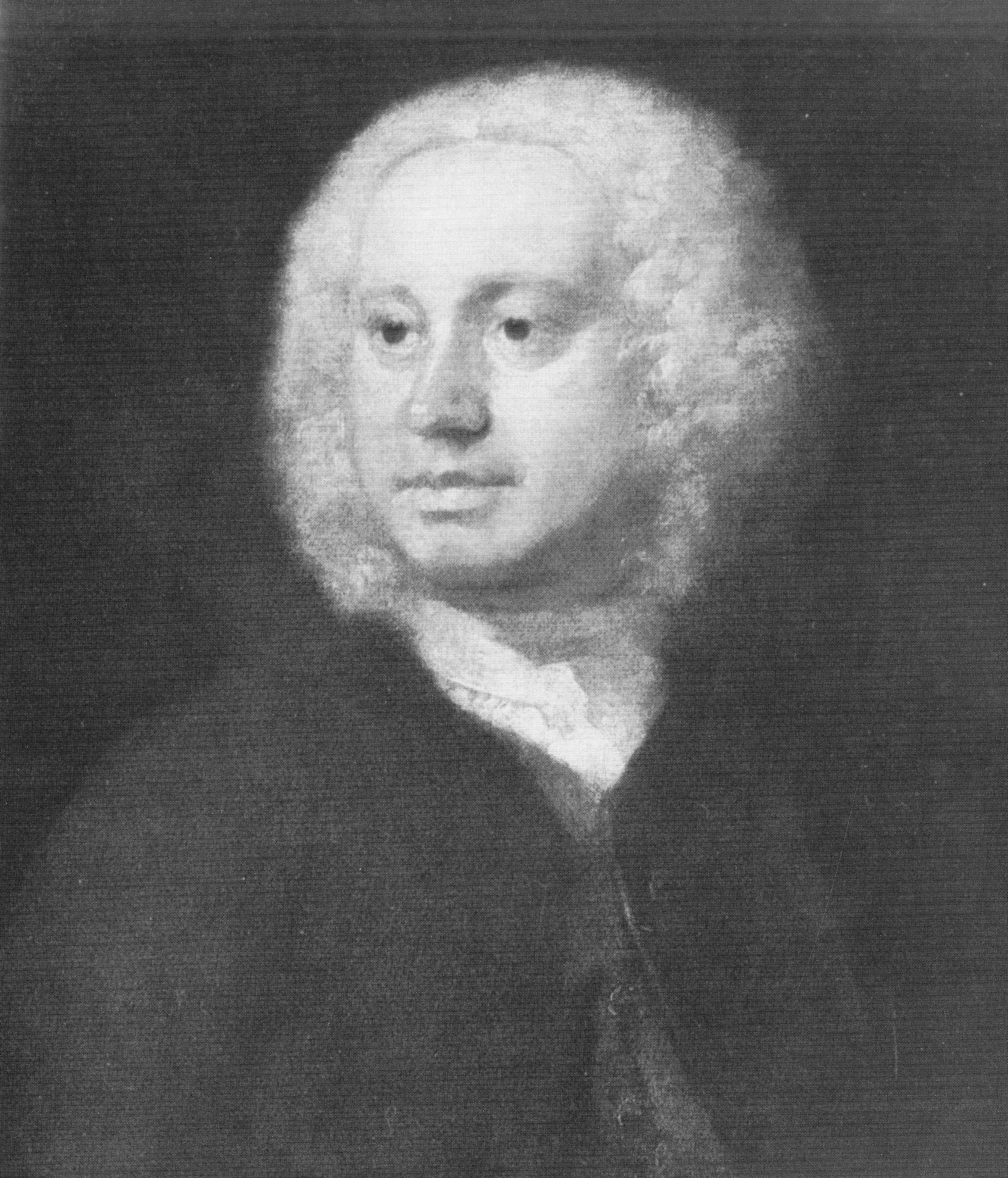
- Portrait of Bridgeman
- Born: 1690
- Died: 1738 (aged 47–48)
- Occupation: Garden designer
- Spouse: Sarah Mist

Charles Bridgeman (1690–1738) was an English garden designer who helped pioneer the naturalistic landscape style. Although he was a key figure in the transition of English garden design from the Anglo-Dutch formality of patterned parterres and avenues to a freer style that incorporated formal, structural and wilderness elements, Bridgeman's innovations in English landscape architecture have been somewhat eclipsed by the work of his more famous successors, William Kent and Lancelot "Capability" Brown.

== Career ==
Little is recorded of the early life of Charles Bridgeman. He was born in 1690 and raised in modest circumstances. His father was a gardener who is reported to have worked at Wimpole Hall in Cambridgeshire for the Earl of Oxford. The younger Bridgeman entered the landscaping profession by working for the Brompton Park Nursery. By 1714 he had begun working with Henry Wise, with whom he later shared the title of Chief Gardener for the royal gardens (Strong, 1992, 39). Bridgeman married Sarah Mist in 1717.

An early proponent of a less-structured garden design, Bridgeman was a pioneer in the landscape style that spread throughout much of Europe in the 18th century and came to be known as the jardin anglais. A contemporary of Bridgeman's, Horace Walpole, describing his colleague's design style in his essay On Modern Gardening, wrote: "though he still adhered much to strait walks with high clipt hedges, they were only his great lines; the rest he diversified by wilderness, and with loose groves of oak, though still within surrounding hedges" (Amherst, 1896, p. 249). Bridgeman’s approach to landscaping can be summarised in three terms: formal, transitional and progressive. His landscapes displayed formal elements such as parterres, avenues, geometrically shaped lakes and pools, and kitchen gardens. Transitional elements in his designs included lawns, amphitheatres, garden buildings and statues, winding paths through wooded areas to viewing points and the use of ha-has; these features are some of the progressive ideas he helped bring into favour.

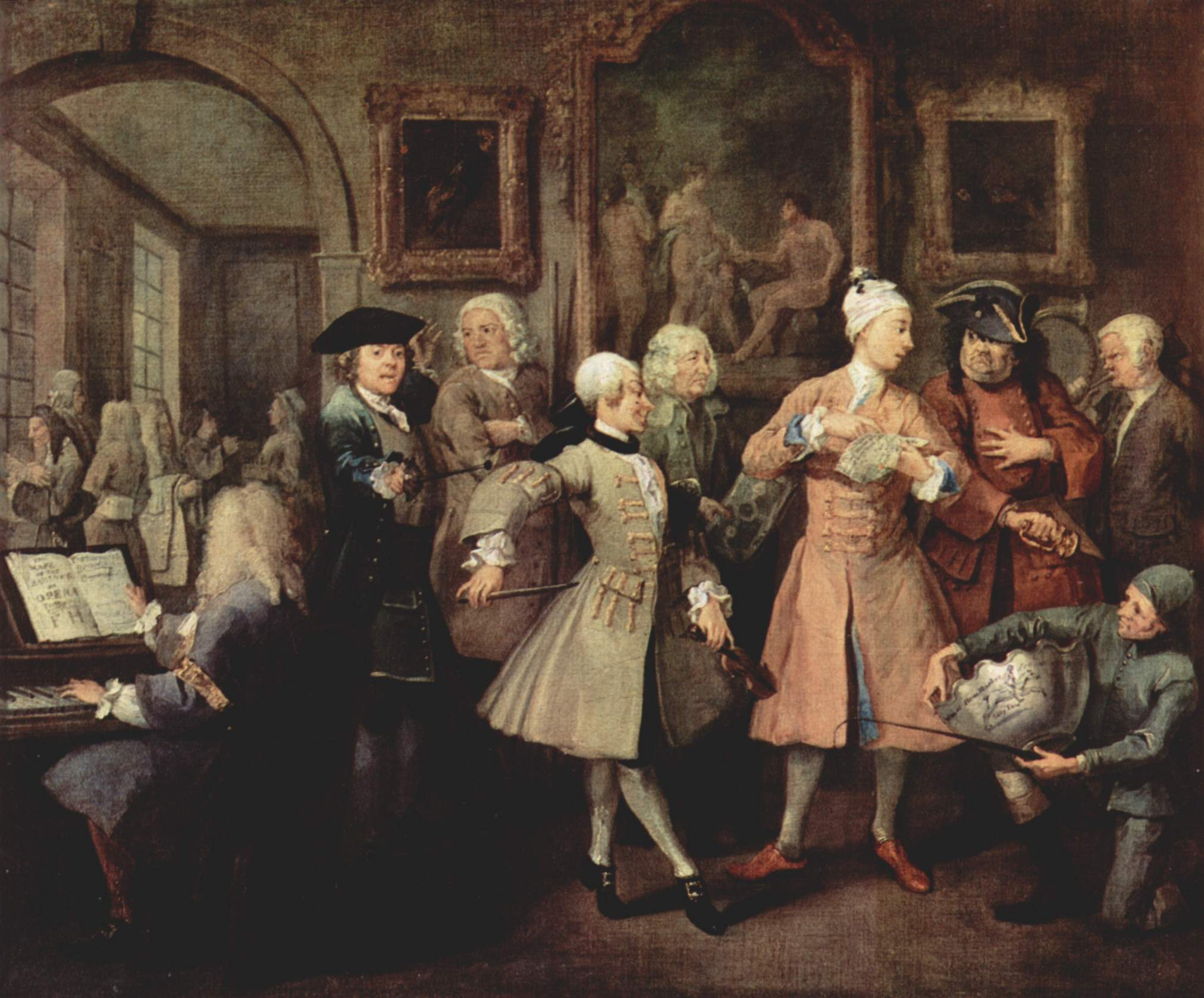
Bridgeman, clutching a garden plan, behind the dancing-master in William Hogarth's A Rake's Progress, No. 2, 1732–1734

Bridgeman made a name for himself among the artisans of the day with his often dramatic redesigns of the estate gardens belonging to wealthy English nobles. He laid out the extravagant garden of Lord Cobham at Stowe, which compiled temples, pillars, finely carved stone statues, summer houses, and a miniature replica of an Egyptian pyramid (Amherst, 1896, p. 251). This was perhaps most his most renowned work. English essayist and poet Alexander Pope wrote of Bridgeman's creations at Stowe as being the "work to wonder at" (Batey, et al., 1990, p. 168).

Bridgeman participated in the design of a garden at Rousham House in Oxfordshire that included cascades, fountains, square pools, an outdoor theatre, and a wilderness area that could be viewed from a vantage point within the main garden. Batey and Lambert (1990, p. 156) wrote of this garden: "at Rousham the views out into the countryside are as important as those in the garden". Other estate gardens Bridgeman had a hand in planning include Claremont, Cassiobury Park, Cliveden, Chiswick House, Kew Gardens, Wimpole Hall, Briggens House in Essex, and Amesbury Abbey in Wiltshire.

However, Bridgeman perhaps remains best known for his tenure as Royal Gardener for Queen Anne and Prince George of Denmark. He was promoted to this position, which he held for ten years, upon the retirement of his mentor, Henry Wise. As Royal Gardener, Bridgeman tended – and in many cases, redesigned – the royal gardens at Windsor, Kensington Palace, Hampton Court, St. James's Park and Hyde Park.

== See also ==
- Houghton Hall, Norfolk
- Wolterton Hall, Norfolk
