= Loch Eilt =

Lake in Scotland

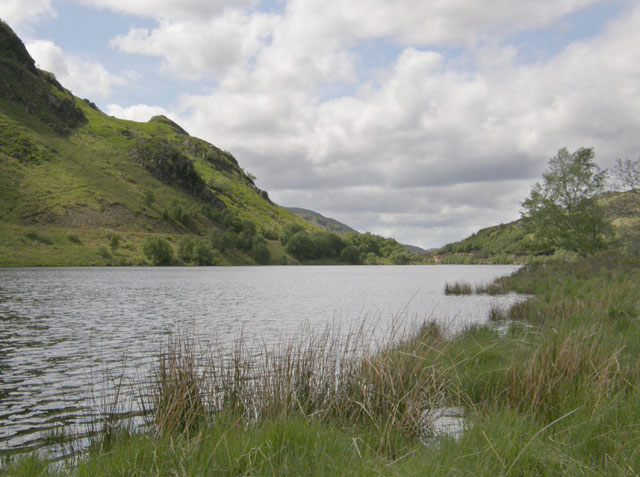

- Location within Highland
- Location: Lochaber, Highland, Scotland
- Coordinates: 56.879°N 5.586°W
- Primary outflows: River Ailort
- Max. length: 5 km (3.1 mi)
- Max. width: 0.5 km (0.31 mi)

Loch Eilt is a freshwater loch in Lochaber, in the West Highlands of Scotland. It is between the villages of Glenfinnan and Lochailort, 30 km west of Fort William. The A830 road runs along the north shore, while the West Highland Line railway follows the south shore.

Loch Eilt separates the traditional districts of Morar to the north and Moidart to the south. The loch has a number of small islands, including Eilean Mòr, Eilean an Tighe, Eilean Gaineamhach, Eilean nan Corra-ghriodhach and Eilean na Mòine.

Loch Eilt has been used as a location in several films. These include Local Hero (1983), Harry Potter and the Prisoner of Azkaban (2004) and Harry Potter and the Deathly Hallows – Part 1 (2010). The famous island used for Harry Potter in Loch Eilt is called Eilean na Moine. It was used as Dumbledore's grave, which was later digitally placed on Loch Arkaig.

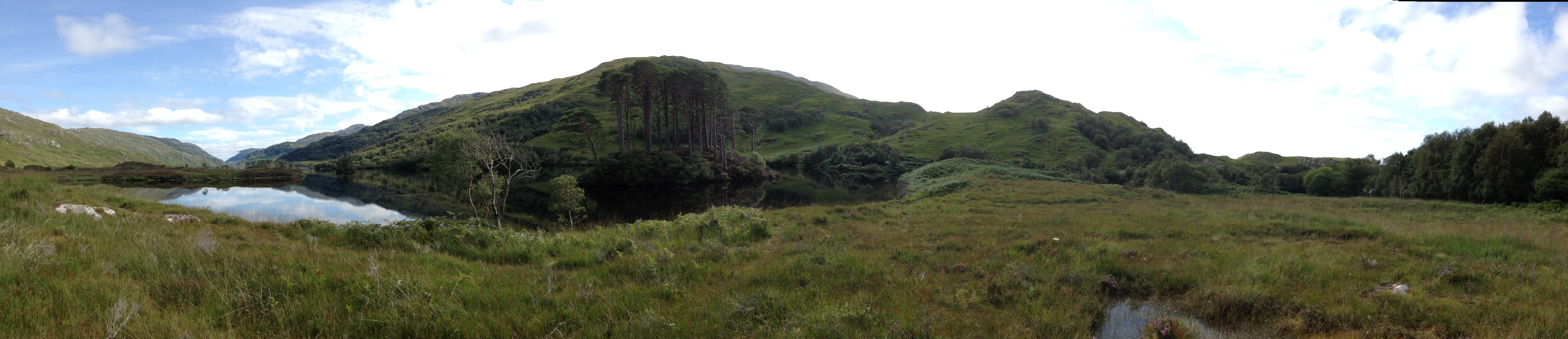
Eilean na Mòine from the northern bank.
