= Lochailort =

Coordinates: 56.87407°N 5.65564°W

Lochailort: Scottish Gaelic: Ceann Loch Ailleart
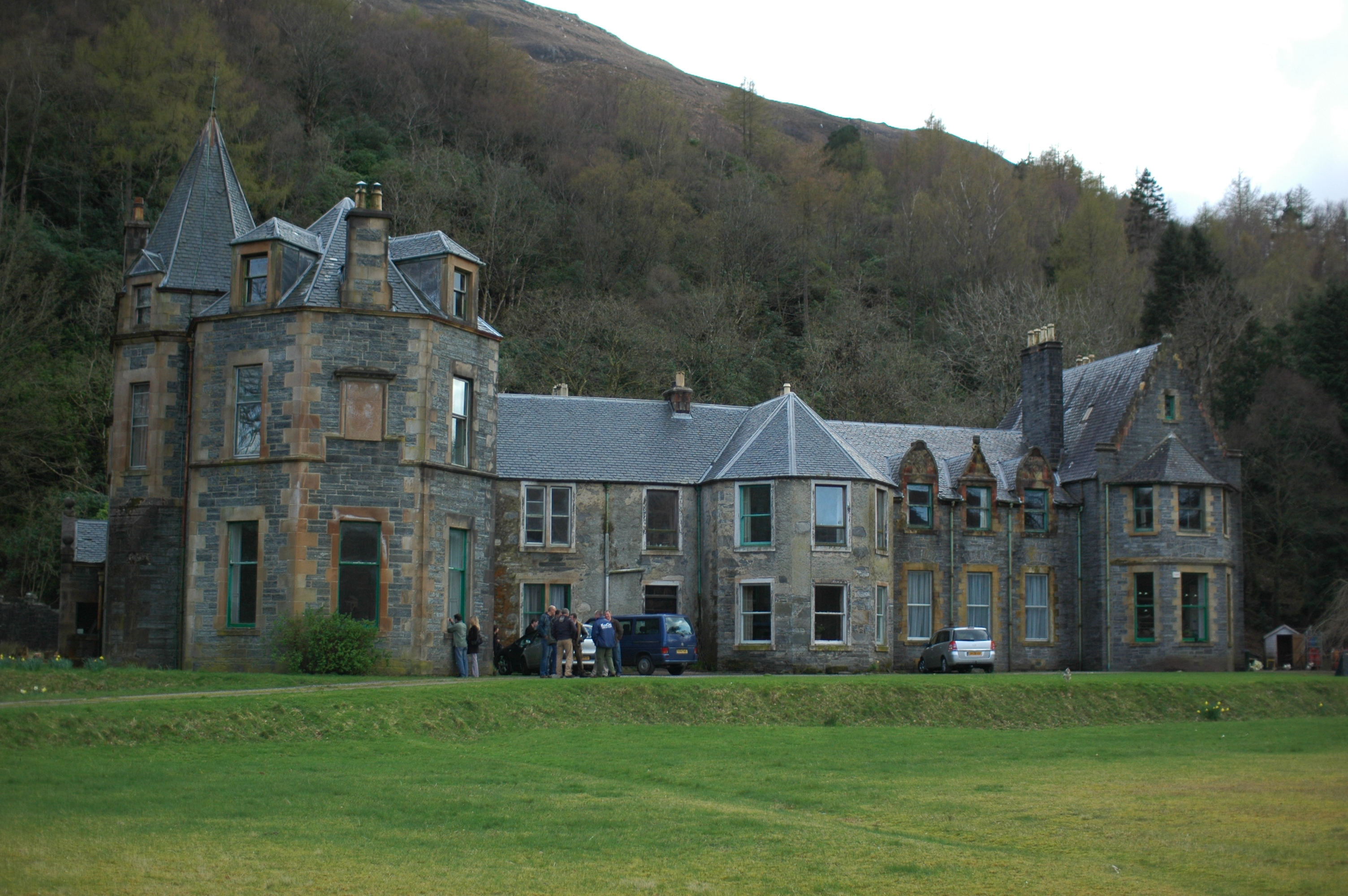
- Inverailort House

- Location within the Lochaber area
- OS grid reference: NM773818
- Council area: Highland
- Lieutenancy area: Inverness
- Country: Scotland
- Sovereign state: United Kingdom
- Post town: LOCHAILORT
- Postcode district: PH38
- Dialling code: 01687
- Police: Scotland
- Fire: Scottish
- Ambulance: Scottish
- UK Parliament: Argyll, Bute and South Lochaber
- Scottish Parliament: Skye, Lochaber and Badenoch

Lochailort (/lɒxˈaɪlərt/ lokh-EYE-lərt, Scottish Gaelic: Ceann Loch Ailleart) is a small settlement in Scotland that lies at the head of Loch Ailort, a sea loch, on the junction of the Road to the Isles (A830) between Fort William and Mallaig with the A861 towards Salen and Strontian. It is served by Lochailort railway station on the West Highland Line.

Nearby is Lochailort Inn, a public house, and Our Lady of the Braes, a small Roman Catholic church that was consecrated in 1874 but little used since 1964 as Sunday Mass is celebrated in the chapel at Inverailort House which is located on the opposite side of the loch.

== History ==
The owner of Inverailort House, Christian Cameron, was a keen photographer in the late 19th century. She took many photographs of the house and surrounding area but most of the glass plates were lost or destroyed when the military took over the house during World War II but the surviving photographs have been published in a book. Christian Cameron is said to have died of a broken heart after much of the contents of the house were badly damaged by the army when they emptied it.

The house was requisitioned by the War Office at the end of May 1940 for use in the training of irregular forces as the Special Training Centre. Initially this was operated by MI(R) but became part of Combined Operations. Many techniques of guerrilla and irregular warfare were developed there and training techniques which were adopted for Commando training as well as Achnacarry Castle. SOE training was centred on nearby Arisaig House.

The army moved out of the house on 20 August 1942 and, after having been taken over by the Royal Navy, subsequently became HMS Lochailort and was used for the training of naval cadet ratings to be officers on small craft used by Combined Operations. The Royal Navy moved out in January 1945.

== Film locations ==
The village and nearby buildings have appeared in films such as Local Hero, Breaking the Waves and Complicity. The main businesses in the area are tourism and salmon farming both in the sea loch, and in a large freshwater hatchery.

== See also ==
- Lech-a-Vuie Platform railway station
