= Loch a' Ghille Ghobaich =

Freshwater loch

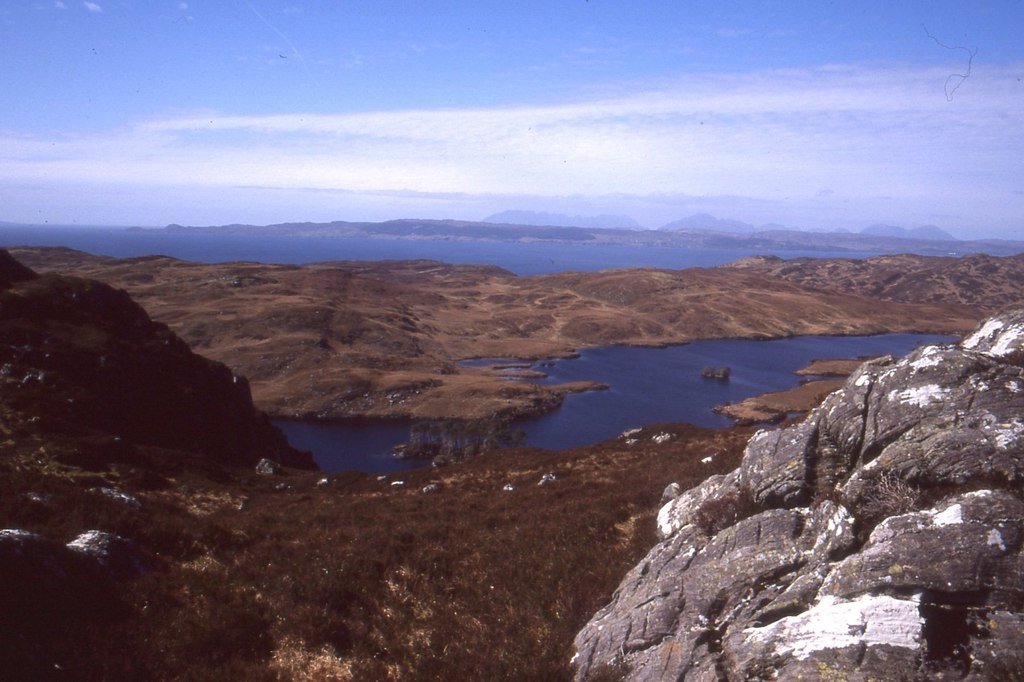
- Loch a' Ghille Ghobaich viewed from an ascent of Sgùrr na Dubh-creige.

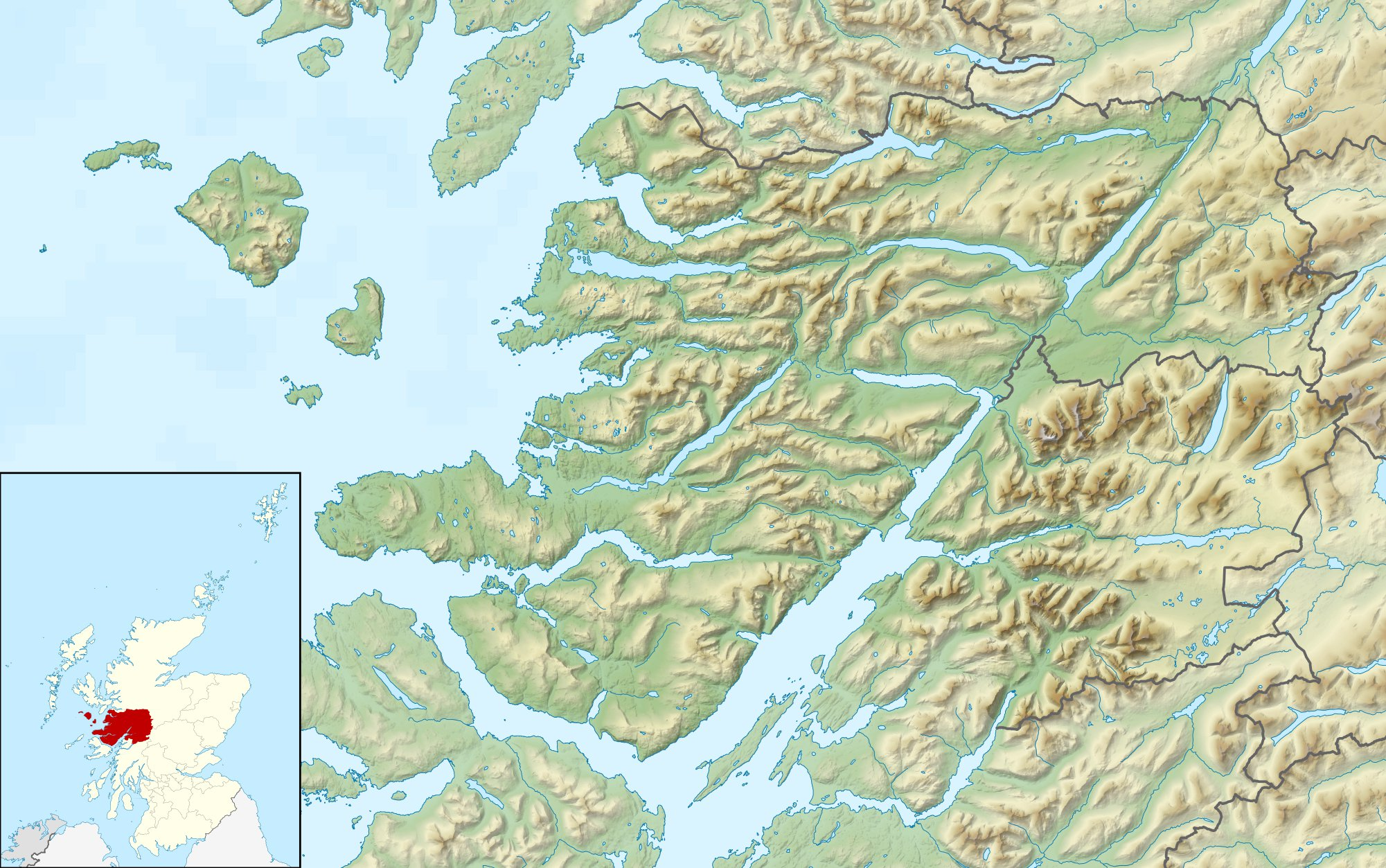
- Location in Lochaber
- Location: NM68559419
- Coordinates: 56.9823°N 5.8109°W
- Type: freshwater loch
- Max. length: 4.29 km (2.67 mi)
- Max. width: 0.30 km (0.19 mi)
- Surface area: 25 ha (62 acres)
- Average depth: 17.4 ft (5.3 m)
- Water volume: 1,312,835 m^{3} (46,362,300 ft^{3})
- Shore length^{1}: 4 km (2.5 mi)
- Surface elevation: 66 m (217 ft)
- Islands: 7
- ^{1} Shore length is not a well-defined measure.

Loch a' Ghille Ghobaich (Loch of the Meddlesome or Gossiping Ghillie) is a large irregular shaped freshwater hill loch, situated on a north-south orientation, that lies about a half-mile north of the west-end of Loch Morar and is south-by-southeast of Mallaig in the Lochaber district of Scotland. The loch is also occasionally known as Loch a' Ghille Ghobhaich.

== Gallery ==
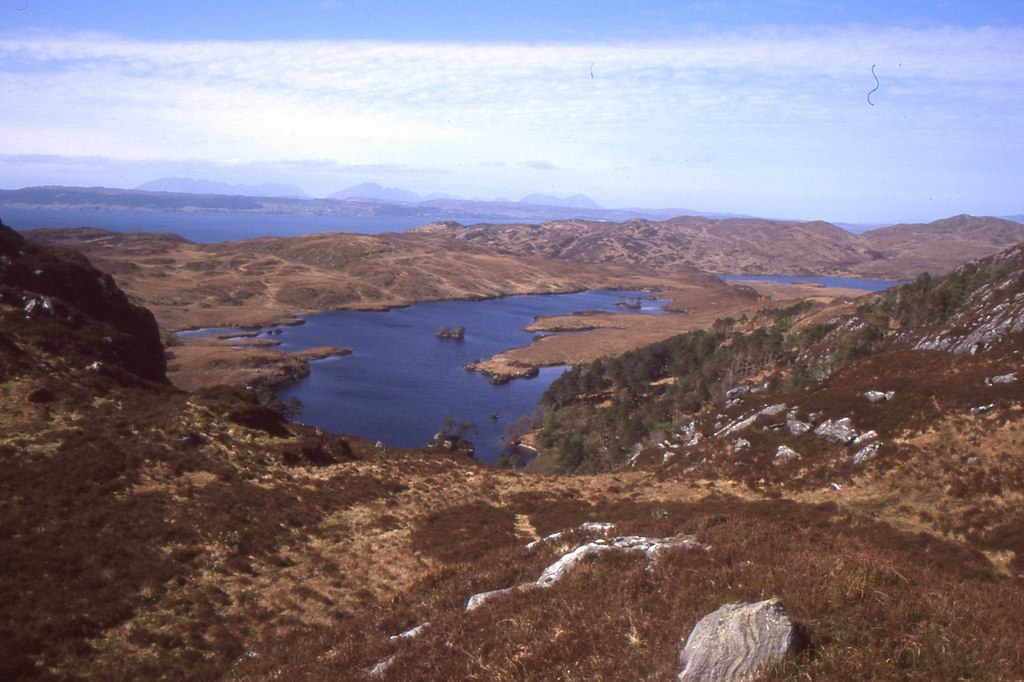
View from Cruich Bheoraid at the southend of the loch

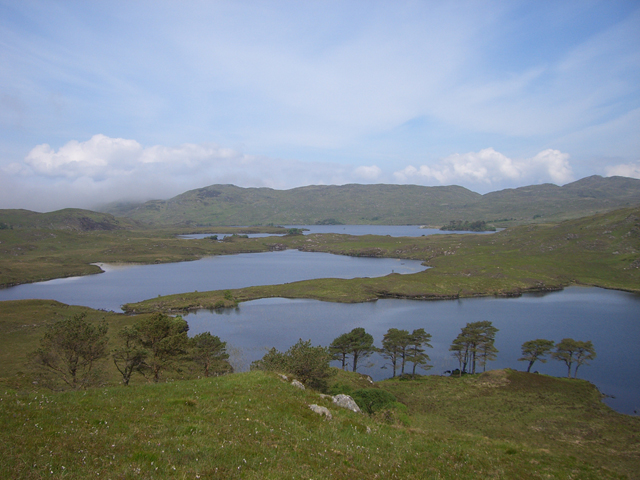
View of southend of Loch a Bhada Dharaich, directly to the east
