= Thatched Barn =

Coordinates: 51°39′25″N 0°15′01″W

The Thatched Barn was a two-storey mock-Tudor hotel built in the 1930s on the Barnet by-pass in Borehamwood, Hertfordshire, England. It was bought by holiday camp founder, Billy Butlin, before being requisitioned as Station XV by the Special Operations Executive (SOE) in World War Two, and used to train secret agents. In the 1960s, it became a Playboy Club, and later it became associated with Elstree Film Studios, and was used as a location for TV series The Saint, and later The Prisoner. The original building was demolished at the end of the 1980s, and replaced by a modern hotel, now the Holiday Inn Elstree.

Film stars known to have visited the hotel include Bette Davis.

== 1930s: Roadhouse to the stars ==
In 1927, the Thatched Barn was commissioned by a Mrs Merrick and opened in 1934 as a "roadhouse", and a place where film stars could meet a lady.

In 1939, Billy Butlin purchased the Thatched Barn as his first hotel; however, like his camps, it was requisitioned (this time by the SOE) before he could develop it further.

== 1940s: SOE – Station XV of the Inter Services Research Bureaux ==
In June 1942, the Inter Services Research Bureau part of the Special Operations Executive moved its Camouflage Section and main workshops to the Thatched Barn, developing a research facility to create camouflage, explosive devices, and coding equipment. Station XV was run by film director and World War I RAF veteran Capt. J. Elder Wills, who recruited artists, stage prop experts and even magicians; British stage magician Jasper Maskelyne was associated with the Station.

== 1950s: Building Research centre ==
In the 1950s, the Ministry of Works used the Thatched Barn as its Building Research Station, for example, to test concrete.

== 1960s–1970s: Association with Elstree Studios ==
As an expensive hotel close to Elstree Film Studios, the Thatched Barn was used by film stars and film makers. Director Michael Winner says that, during the days before it was possible to telephone America directly from outside London, he would drive to the Thatched Barn to make transatlantic telephone calls in order to cast his film Chato's Land (1972).

The hotel also hosted a number of cast members of The Shining during its filming in the late 1970s, including Scatman Crothers.

== 1980s: Demolition ==
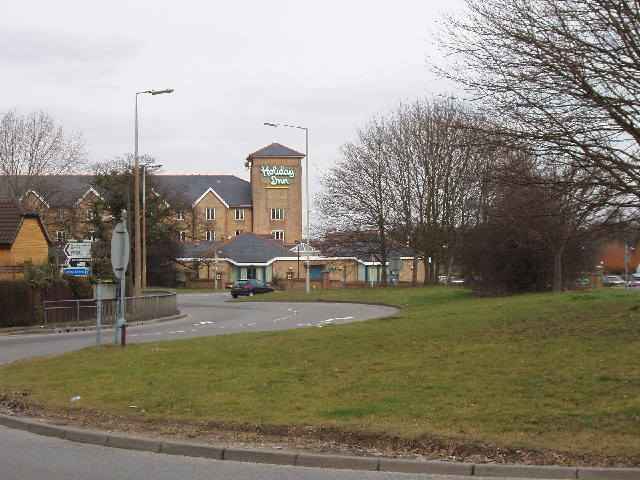
The Holiday Inn built on the site

In the late 1980s the building was demolished, and replaced with a modern hotel, the Elstree Moat House, which later became a Holiday Inn and in late 2020/early 2021 was bought by Hilton and rebranded as a Doubletree by Hilton.
