= Tarbet, Loch Nevis =

Coordinates: 56.970°N 5.636°W

Tarbet
- Location within the Lochaber area
- Population: 6
  - Edinburgh: 182 mi (293 km) (road) from Morar
  - London: 552 mi (888 km) (road) from Morar
- Civil parish: Ardgour
- Council area: Highland
- Lieutenancy area: Inverness
- Country: Scotland
- Sovereign state: United Kingdom
- Post town: Mallaig
- Postcode district: PH41
- Dialling code: 01687
- Police: Scotland
- Fire: Scottish
- Ambulance: Scottish
- UK Parliament: Ross, Skye and Lochaber
- Scottish Parliament: Inverness East, Nairn and Lochaber

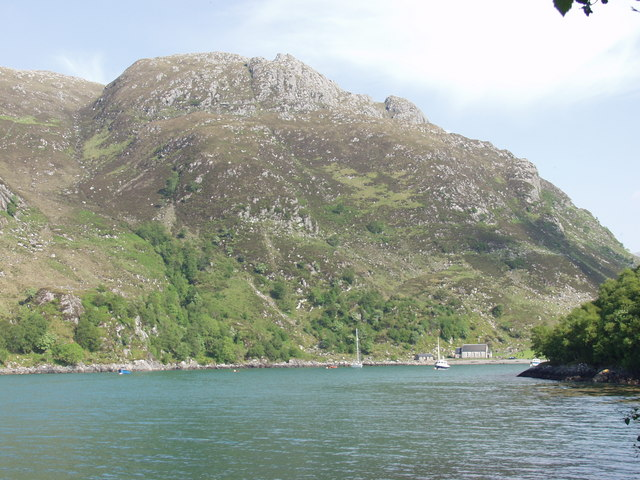
Tarbet Bay

Tarbet (Scottish Gaelic: An Tairbeart or Tairbeart Loch Nibheis) is a place on the south shore of Loch Nevis in Scotland, about 6 miles (10 kilometres) east of Mallaig. The name 'tarbet' (or 'tarbert') refers to a portage or isthmus, in this case it is between Loch Nevis and Loch Morar.

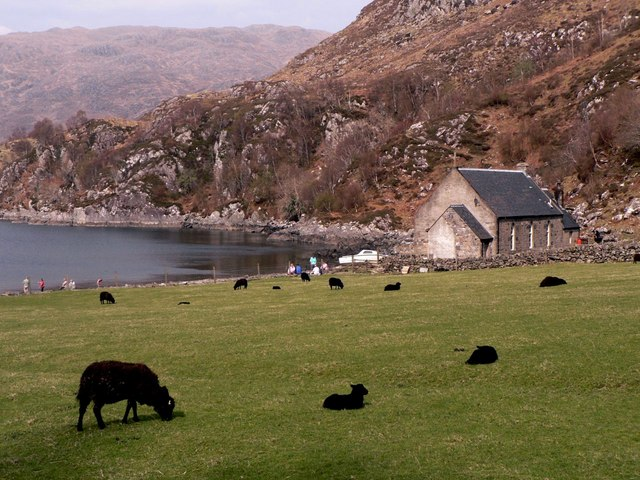
Former church at Tarbet

Tarbet has a permanent population of six. Tarbet is not connected to any roads, and access is by a path from Bracorina, to the east of Morar. There is also an on-demand passenger ferry service to Mallaig and Inverie, in Knoydart.
