= List of SOE establishments =

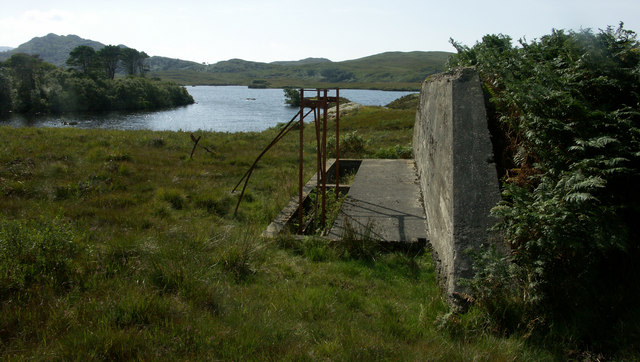
This target was probably erected during World War II for use by SOE agents training at nearby Glasnacardoch House.

The following is an incomplete list of training centres, research and development sites, administrative sites and other establishments used by the Special Operations Executive during the Second World War.

== Numbered stations ==
Establishments concerned with experimental work, storage and production were given Roman numerals (mostly in Hertfordshire). Active stations and training schools had Arabic numbers. These included paramilitary schools around Arisaig in Scotland, "finishing" schools around Beaulieu in Hampshire and operational schools in various counties including Gloucestershire, Leicestershire, Oxfordshire.

== Active stations ==
These were SOE's radio stations, established when SOE's signals establishments were separated from that of SIS / GCCS at Bletchley Park (originally "Station X"). This formally took place on 1 June 1942.

- Station 53a: Grendon Hall in Grendon Underwood, near Aylesbury, Buckinghamshire - signals centre. Now Spring Hill Prison.
- Station 53: Poundon House, Buckinghamshire, near Bicester - radio listening and transmission station.

== Experimental stations (Research & Development) ==
Experimental stations were mainly based in and around Hertfordshire, and included:

- Station VI: Bride Hall near Ayot St Lawrence, Hertfordshire - the weapons acquisition section.
- Station VIIa: Bontex Knitting Mills, Beresford Avenue, Wembley - Wireless Section Production
- Station VIIb: Yeast-Vite factory, Whippendell Road, Watford - Wireless Section, packing and dispatch
- Station VIIc: Allensor's joinery factory, King George's Avenue, Watford - Wireless Section Research
- Section VIId: Kay's garage, Bristol Street, Birmingham - Wireless Section Production
- Station VIII: Queen Mary Reservoir, Staines - Engineering section
- Station IX: The Frythe estate near Welwyn Garden City, which began as a wireless research unit (Special Signals), then became a weapons development & production centre, then a research and development station. Now a factory belonging to GlaxoSmithKline
- Station IXa: P O Box 1, Ashford, Middlesex - Submersibles work at Staines reservoir.
- Station IXc: Fishguard Bay Hotel, Goodwick, Pembrokeshire - Submersibles work in Fishguard Bay.
- Station X: The original name for Bletchley Park in Buckinghamshire that continued to be used as a nickname for BP after it went on to greater things.
- Station XI: Old Gorhambury House near St Albans, Hertfordshire - Accommodation.
- Station XII: Aston House near Stevenage, Hertfordshire - Research and Development of sabotage explosives and weapons, etc.
- Station XIV: Briggens House, near Roydon, Essex, contained the Forgery Section.
- Station XV: The Thatched Barn - road house on the Barnet bypass at Borehamwood, Hertfordshire - Camouflage Section. Much of the work of this station involved the final equipping of agents who came through the Thatched Barn prior to going to France. Typical of the work was reproducing French clothing which was copied from newspaper photographs, catalogues etc. and had to be perfect down to the last stitch and button. Maps were hand sewn into silk underwear, agents were made up with false humped backs etc. to enhance their disguise. Strict anonymity was observed. The station was also concerned with the development of booby traps including very original devices such as bicycle pumps which were swapped and exploded when used. Other work included packing hand grenades into tins labelled as fruit. The labels were reproduced by skilled artists to look like the real thing. Plaster of Paris was moulded and painted to resemble a log and inside was a Sten gun.
- Station XVa: 56 Queen's Gate, Kensington, London SW7 - Camouflage Section - prototypes.
- Station XVb: The Demonstration Room, Natural History Museum in London. Camouflage Section - A training centre for agents and for briefing officials.
- Station XVc: 2-3 Trevor Square, Knightsbridge, South Kensington - Camouflage Section, photographic and make-up section.
- Station XVII: Brickendonbury, Brickendon, Hertford - Explosive trials

== Training schools ==
- STS 1: Brock Hall, Flore, Northamptonshire
- STS 2: Bellasis, Box Hill Road, Dorking, Surrey - training of SOE staff and Danes, Italians. Became training and holding centre used by Czech Section and for F Section coup de main parties. Later used for initial assessment of German Army PoWs as BONZO agents.
- STS 3: Stodham Park, Liss, Hampshire - Norwegian depot school, staff training courses, British and OSS Jedburghs initial assessment centre, specialised course in mines and the use of enemy weapons, training of German and Russian (German Army) former POWs.
- STS 4: Winterfold, Cranleigh, Surrey - Preliminary School for N (Dutch) and T (Belgian) Sections. From June 1943 became STS 7, Students' Assessment Board (SAB).
- STS 5: Wanborough Manor, Puttenham, Guildford, Surrey - initially the Preliminary School for F (French) Section, later (from June 1943) holding depot for Dutch agents and training of German Army PoWs as BONZOs.
- STS 6: West Court, Finchampstead, Wokingham, Berkshire
- STS 7 (formerly STS 4): Winterfold, Cranleigh, Surrey - Students' Assessment Board for several nationalities/sections.
- STS 17: Brickendonbury Manor - sabotage
- Station 17 (originally XVII): Brickendonbury Manor, Brickendon, Hertford, Hertfordshire
- STS 19: Gardener's End, Ardeley, Stevenage, Hertfordshire - Bonzos for Operation Periwig
- Station 19: Gardener's End, Ardeley, Stevenage, Hertfordshire
- STS 20a & 20b: Pollards Park House, Chalfont St Giles - Polish section
- STS 21: Arisaig House, Arisaig, Inverness-shire - commando-style training
- STS 22: Rhubana Lodge, Morar, Inverness-shire
- STS 22a: Glasnacardoch Lodge, Mallaig, Inverness-shire - weapons store where weapons were serviced and checked for accuracy.
- STS 23: Meoble Lodge, beside Loch Morar, Inverness-shire
- STS 23b: Swordland, Tarbet Bay, beside Loch Morar, Inverness-shire
- STS 24a: Inverie House, Knoydart, near Mallaig, Inverness-shire
- STS 24b: Glaschoille, Knoydart, Mallaig, Inverness-shire
- STS 25a: Garramor, South Morar, Inverness-shire
- STS 25b: Camusdarach, South Morar, Inverness-shire
- STS 25c: Traigh House, South Morar, Inverness-shire
- STS 26: Drumintoul Lodge, Aviemore, Inverness-shire and Glenmore Lodge, Inverness-shire - Norwegian Holding School / Main Headquarters of Linge Company
- Station XXVIII (28): Tyting House, St Martha's Hill, Guildford. Holding/security establishment, also housed Field Security Section.
- STS 31 to STS 36: Beaulieu, Hampshire - Finishing Schools
- STS 31: The Rings, Beaulieu, Hampshire - security training for agents
- STS 31: The House in the Woods, Beaulieu, Hampshire
- STS 32: Harford House, Beaulieu, Hampshire
- STS 32a: Saltmarsh, Beaulieu, Hampshire
- STS 32b: Blackbridge, Beaulieu, Hampshire
- STS 35: Vineyards, Beaulieu, Hampshire - radio and telegraphy mostly french
- STS 36: Boarmans, Beaulieu, Hampshire - female only
- STS 37a: ??? - advanced photography
- STS 38: Briggens House, near Roydon, Essex - Polish Section.
- STS 39: (Hackett School), ??? - subversive propaganda
- STS 40: Howbury Hall, near Waterend, Bedford - training in use of EUREKA, REBECCA and S-Phone. Reception Committee School.
- STS 41: Gumley Hall, Market Harborough
- STS 42: Roughwood Park, Chalfont St Giles, Bucks
- STS 43: Audley End House, Essex - Polish section
- STS 44: Water Eaton Manor near Oxford
- STS 45: Hatherop Castle, Fairford, Gloucestershire - Danish Holding School / Headquarters
- STS 46: Chichely Hall, Buckinghamshire - Czechoslovak Section
- STS 47: Anderson Manor Dorset - advanced training on weapons, mines, booby traps, Snipers course
- STS 49: Forthampton House, Tewkesbury, Gloucestershire
- STS 50: Gorse Hill, Witley near Godalming in Surrey
- STS 51: Dunham House, Altrincham, Cheshire - parachute training (near RAF Ringway)
- STS 51b: Fulshaw Hall, Wilmslow, Cheshire - parachute training (near RAF Ringway)
- STS 52: Thame Park, Oxfordshire - security training for wireless operators
- Station 53c: Poundon, Buckinghamshire, near Bicester. - Training American forces in SOE communications techniques. Station 53b and Station 53c were physically separate establishments but close to each other. Some of the staff from Station 53b were transferred when Station 53c opened.
- STS 54a: Fawley Court, Henley on Thames - Signals Section (Wireless Operators)
- STS 54b: Belhaven School, Dunbar - Signals Section (Wireless Operators)
- STS 61: Audley End, Saffron Walden - packing parachute containers
- STS 61: Gaynes' Hall, St Neots (after April 1942)
- STS 62, later Station 62: Anderson Manor, Anderson, Dorset
- STS 63: Warnham Court, Warnham, Horsham, West Sussex. Used by EU/P (Polish Minorities) Section, including for (aborted) Operation Bardsea and Operation Dunstable.
- STS 101: Tanjong Baili, Singapore.
- STS 102 (also ME 102 and STC 102): Mount Carmel, above Haifa in Mandate Palestine, now Israel. With parachute training at RAF Ramat David, weapons training at Athlit (now Atlit), paramilitary training at Megiddo and (Palmach training) at Mishmar HaEmek.
- STS 103: Camp X - Whitby, Ontario, Canada - used to train Canadian and American agents

== Other sites ==
Other stations, whose code numbers are unknown, included:

- Gaynes Hall near St Neots in Cambridgeshire: Norwegian section.
- The Firs, Whitchurch: a large house in Whitchurch, Buckinghamshire, home of the semi-independent section MD1
- Henley-on-Thames: Quartermaster
- Norgeby House, 83 Baker Street, London: headquarters of European country sections
- No 6 Special Workshop School, Inverlair, Inverness-shire: Known colloquially as "The Cooler" and possibly ISRB Workshops, agents who had either failed their training or been recalled from operations were sent here.
- Pictures of many of the sites in the southeast of England
- Messrs Carpet Trades Ltd of Kidderminster: Packed about 18,500 containers after November 1943.
- Erlestoke Park (near Devizes): Another stately home used for the 'Senior Officers School'.
- Station unknown: Spartan factory, North Circular Road, Wembley, London - Unknown
