= Loch Morar =

Lake in Lochaber, Scotland

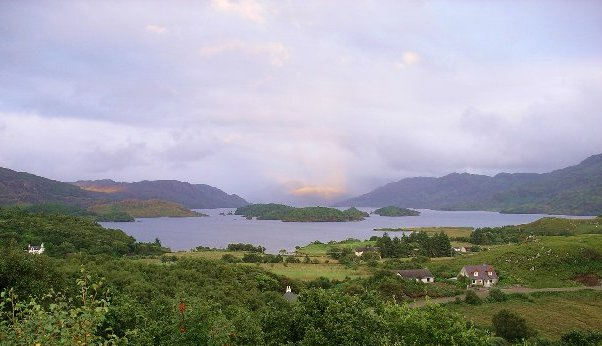
- The shallower western end of the loch

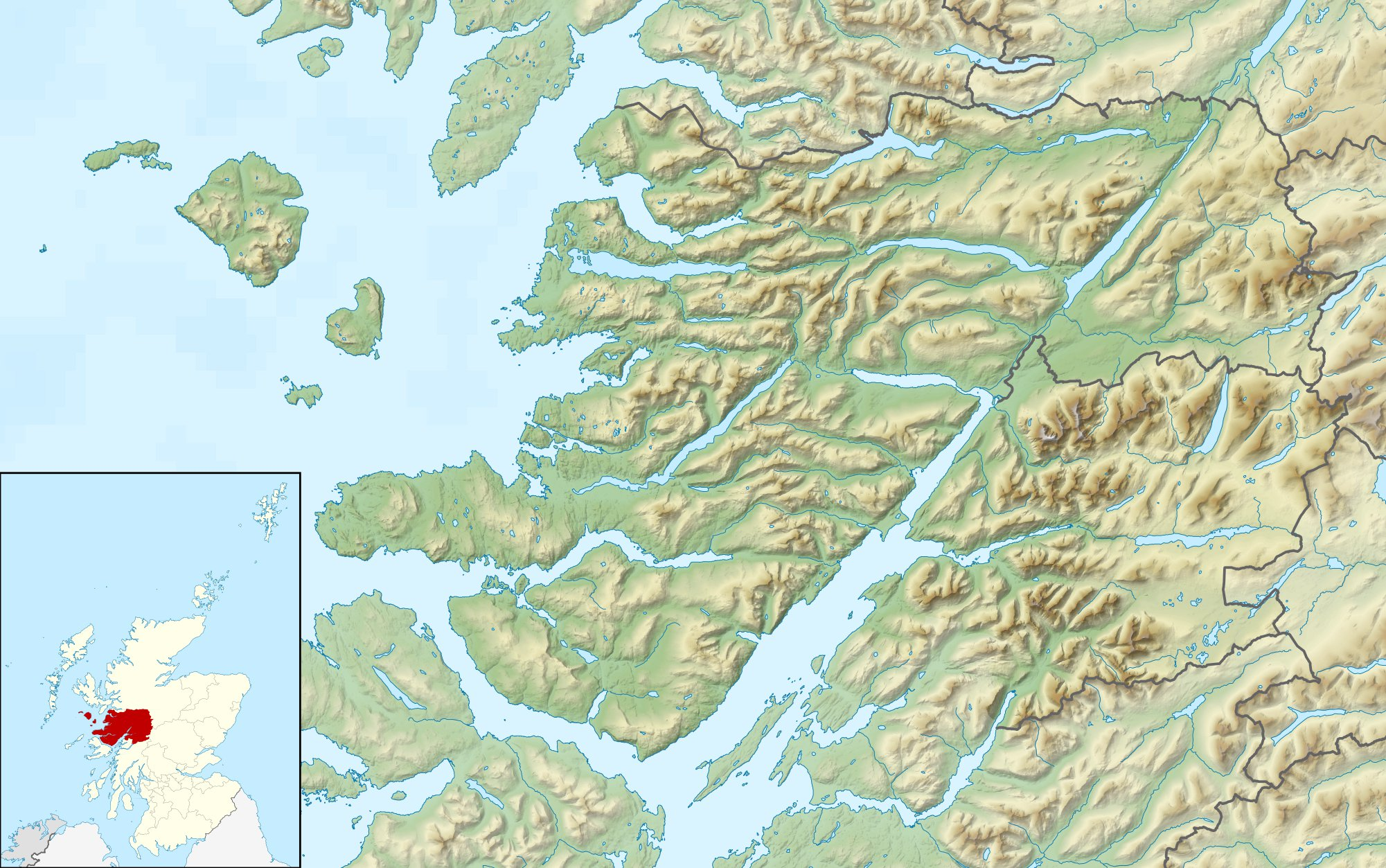
- Location in Lochaber
- Location: NM76129087
- Coordinates: 56°57′00″N 5°40′20″W
- Type: freshwater loch, dimictic, oligotrophic
- Primary inflows: River Meoble
- Primary outflows: River Morar
- Catchment area: 168 square kilometres (65 sq mi)
- Basin countries: Scotland
- Max. length: 18.8 km (11.7 mi)
- Max. width: 2.35 km (1.46 mi)
- Surface area: 26.7 km^{2} (10.3 sq mi)
- Average depth: 87 metres (284 ft)
- Max. depth: 310 m (1,017 ft)
- Water volume: 2.3073 cubic kilometres (81,482,000,000 ft^{3})
- Shore length^{1}: 59 km (37 mi)
- Surface elevation: 9 metres (30 ft)
- ^{1} Shore length is not a well-defined measure.

Loch Morar (Scottish Gaelic: Loch Mòrair) is a freshwater loch in the Rough Bounds of Lochaber, Highland, Scotland. It is the fifth-largest loch by surface area in Scotland, at 26.7 km^{2} (10.3 sq mi), and the deepest freshwater body in the British Isles with a maximum depth of 310 m (1,017 ft). The loch was created by glacial action around 10,000 years ago, and has a surface elevation of 9 metres (30 ft) above sea level. It separates the traditional district of North Morar (which contains the village of Morar), from Arisaig and Moidart.

== Geography ==
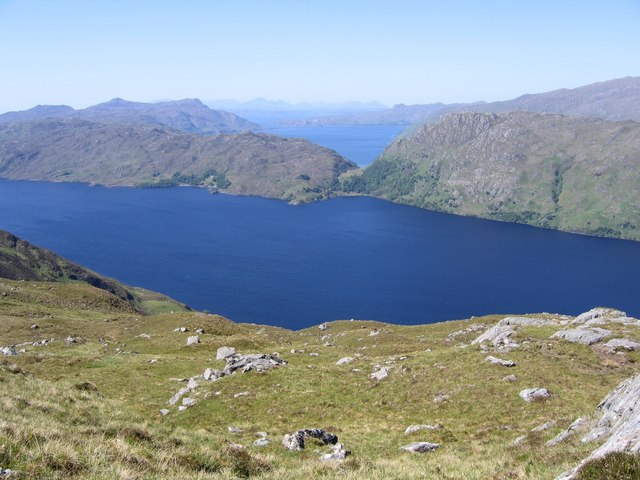
Loch Morar, and North Morar, with Loch Nevis in the distance, and Knoydart and Skye beyond that

Loch Morar is 18.8 kilometres (11.7 mi) long, has a surface area of 26.7 km^{2} (10.3 sq mi), and is the deepest freshwater body in the British Isles with a maximum depth of 310 m (1,017 ft). In 1910, John Murray and Laurence Pullar found it to have a mean depth of 87 metres (284 ft) and a total volume of 2.3073 cubic kilometres (81,482,000,000 ft^{3}) during their survey of Scottish lochs. The bottom is deepened below the United Kingdom Continental Shelf, and until 1943, when a depth of 324 metres (1,063 ft) was observed in the Inner Sound, it was believed to be the deepest water in the United Kingdom. The surface of the loch is 9 metres (30 ft) above sea level.. The lake is the deepest one on an island in Europe.

The water of the loch is clear and oligotrophic, with a minimal intake of nutrients, making it a Site of Special Scientific Interest (SSSI). The main inflow is the River Meoble on the southern side, which drains from Loch Beoraid, although there are three other major inflows at the eastern end of the loch and a stream draining a complex of lochans to the north-west of Loch Morar. The outflow is the River Morar at the western end, which at a few hundred metres long is one of the shortest rivers in the British Isles. At the shallower western end of the loch, there are a number of sizeable forested islands.

At the western end of the loch is the village of Morar, which is between Arisaig and Mallaig on the coastal A830 road. The settlements of Bracorina and Bracara are located along the northern shore of the loch, but there is no road along the southern shore. Tarbet, on the shore of Loch Nevis, is a short distance from Loch Morar.

== Folklore ==
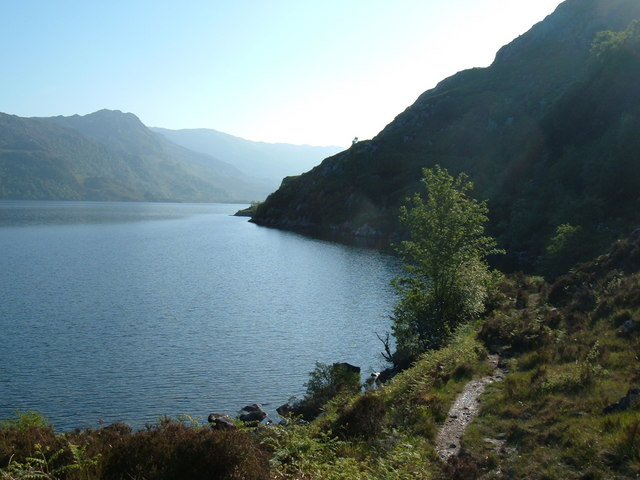
The banks of the loch are steep at the eastern end

According to the posthumously published dictionary of the Scottish Gaelic language collected by Fr. Allan MacDonald (1859–1905), "Loch Morar is said to be blessed by St. Columba and is called (Scottish Gaelic: Tobar Chaluim Chille), 'St. Columba's Well'. It is safe to drink its water though in the greatest heat and perspiration. It does not freeze. The only ice seen about it is at the foot of the mountain streams flowing into it." In relation to Loch Morar's traditional veneration as a holy well, MacDonald also collected, "a story of a young woman who had lost her hair which grew again after she had bathed her head in the Loch."

In common with Loch Ness, occasional reports of large unidentified creatures in the loch's waters are made. The loch monster has been dubbed Mòrag.

== History ==
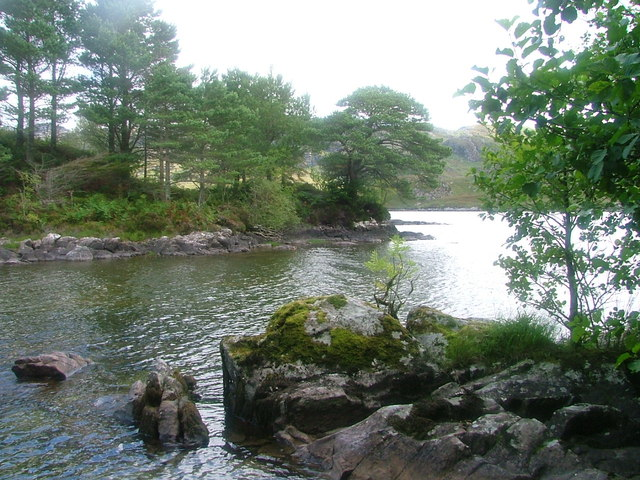
Eilean Bàn in Loch Morar, as it appears today.

The island in Loch Morar known as Eilean Bàn was traditionally used by the local population as grazing for their cattle herds and was, until trees began being planted in the 19th-century, completely bare of the "dense, barely penetrable growth of timber", that covers the island today. The same island was briefly the location first of a Mass stone and then of an illegal and clandestine Catholic minor seminary founded by Bishop James Gordon, until the Jacobite rising of 1715 forced its closure and eventual reopening at Scalan in Glenlivet. Even long afterwards, Eilean Bàn remained a secret chapel and library for Bishop Gordon's successors. According to Strathglass historian Flora Forbes, however, "a Catholic chapel at this time anywhere throughout the Highlands was usually a barn-like structure, with no windows and a mud floor."

After the Battle of Culloden, a combined force of Royal Navy sailors under the command of Captain John Fergussone of HMS Furnace and Captain Duff of HMS Terror and troops from the Campbell of Argyll Militia portaged over nine miles of uncharted, rough, and previously thought to be impassable terrain. They were seeking to capture Bishop Hugh MacDonald, the underground Roman Catholic Vicar General of the Highland District, and high-ranking local Jacobite Army veterans, mainly from Clan Donald, who were correctly suspected of meeting together at the library, former seminary, and Catholic chapel on Eilean Bàn in Loch Morar on 8 June 1746.

According to a later report for the Duke of Newcastle, "Upon their arrival at the lake, they immediately spread themselves opposite to the Isle, and in full view of the rebels thereon; who, concluding themselves quite free from danger, fired on our people, at the same time calling them by insulting and opprobrious names, being near enough to be heard. This exultation, however, was quickly at an end; for the King's ships having sailed round to that part of the coast where their boats had little more than a mile to be carried overland to the lake... the rebels immediately lost all courage..."

Although the Bishop and the Jacobite leaders managed to quickly row from Eilean Bàn to the loch shore and "escaped into the mountains", according the same report for the Duke of Newcastle, when the government soldiers and sailors arrived upon Eilean Bàn, "They found the before-named Popish bishop's house and chapel; which the sailors quickly gutted and demolished, merrily adorning themselves with the spoils of the chapel. In the scramble, a great many books and papers were tossed about and destroyed."

Some of the chapel and seminary foundation stones are still visibly upon Eilean Bàn. Watts has termed the 8 June 1746 book burning and the destruction of most of Bishop MacDonald personal papers, "an irreplaceable loss both for the eighteenth-century Church and the scholar of today."

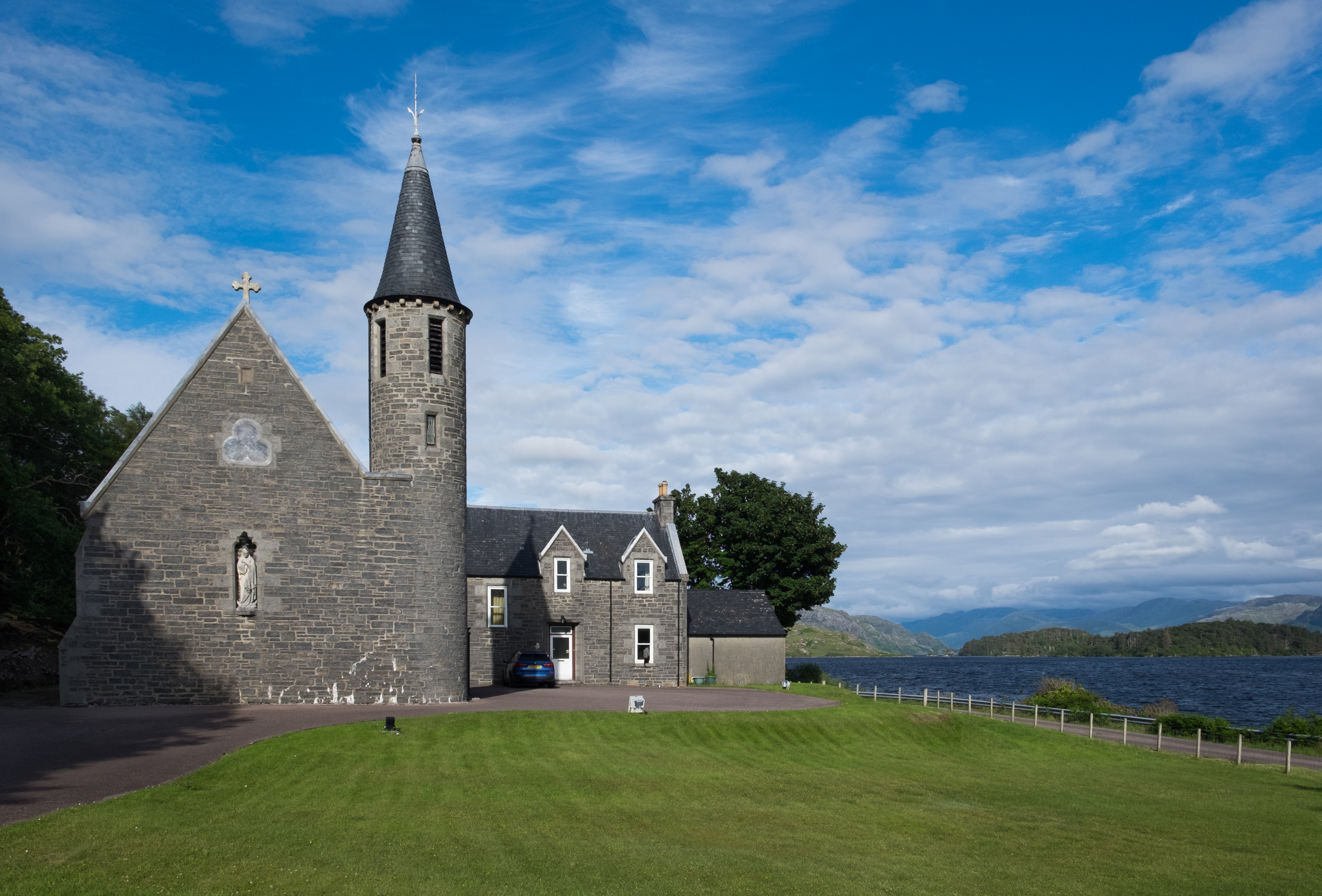
Roman Catholic Church of Our Lady and St Cumin, Morar.

At least some items, though, are believed to have been removed from Eilean Bàn in time. In 1917, Dom Odo Blundell of Fort Augustus Abbey wrote, "At Morar chapel-house is preserved a set of green vestments, with red and white intermingled, bearing the date 1745. It still has its original lining; there is also an altar front to match it. These were probably brought over from France by the adherents of Prince Charlie, and must have been part of the furnishings of the chapel on the island, though it is not known how they were saved when the building was ransacked and burned in 1746. The same remarks apply to the old chalice, which bears the inscription, Ad usum Pr Fr Vincenti Mariani, Missri Scot. Ord. Praedic. Anno 1658. This chalice, which is of silver, is very small indeed; it has its paten to match. Unfortunately, we have no further information regarding this early missioner. In the list of priests for 1668 it is stated that there were three Dominicans on this mission. Father Vincent was apparently one of these; the others being Father George Fanning - long in the Isle of Barra and Father Primrose - who died in prison in 1671."

Following the action, however, Capt. John Fergussone suspected "that Lord Lovat's lameness must have rendered it utterly impracticable for him to travel in so rugged a country", and the crew of HMS Furnace accordingly continued meticulously searching inside the caves surrounding the Loch, "for three days and nights". They eventually, as Capt. Fergussone had expected, succeeded in capturing Lord Lovat, who was hiding inside a cave in nearby Glen Meoble.

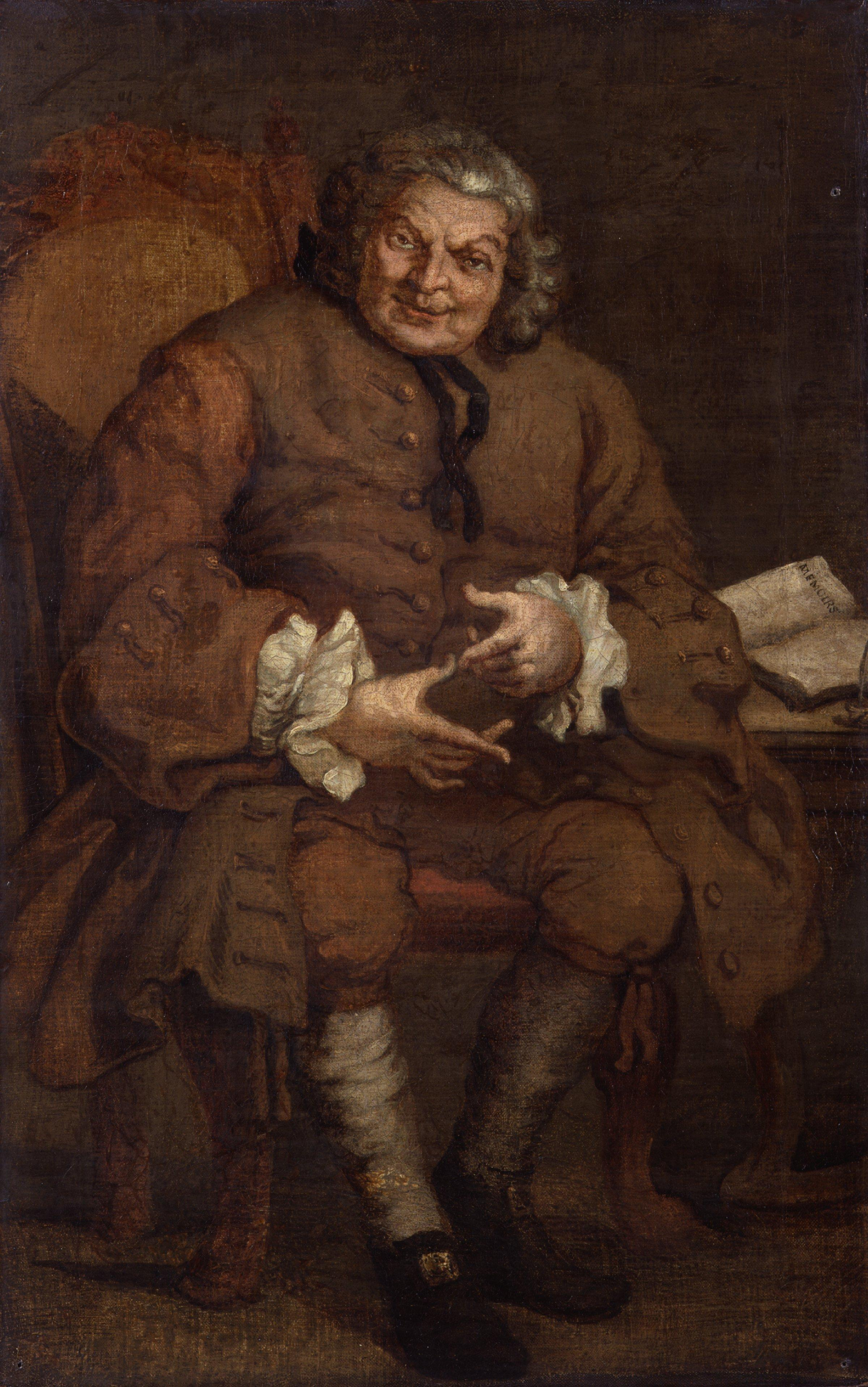
Chief of Clan Fraser and senior Jacobite Army leader Simon Fraser, 11th Lord Lovat, sketched by William Hogarth after his capture at Loch Morar and shortly before being tried for high treason before his peers in the House of Lords and afterwards executed by beheading on Tower Hill.

In his naval history of the Jacobite rising and its aftermath, historian John S. Gibson commented about the capture of Lord Lovat at Loch Morar, "London, which, with the events of the past year, had come to abhor highlanders, could scarcely have been more elated had Charles Edward himself been caught. A small mythology was quick to grow up about the circumstances of his capture, as in the contemporary print of Fergussone and the soldiers of Guise's bursting in on the aged peer disguised as an old woman."

Following his escape into the mountains, Bishop MacDonald remained in hiding locally until he managed to escape to France, during the sixth attempt by the French Royal Navy and French privateers to find and rescue the Prince and his entourage, and was evacuated from what is now the Prince's Cairn at Loch nan Uamh on 19 September 1746.

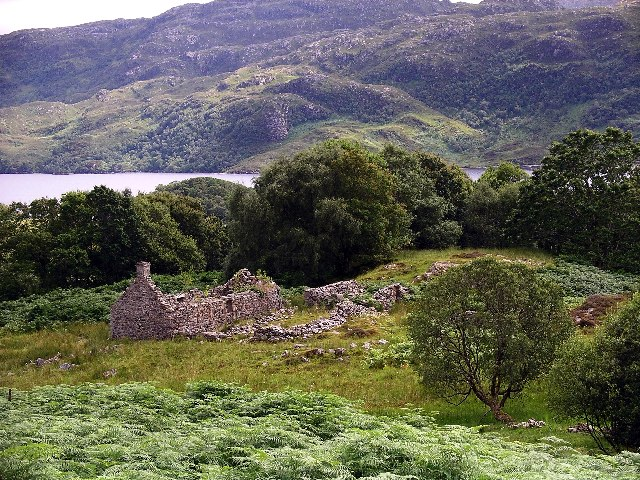
An abandoned house on Morar

During the period of the Highland Clearances, many residents emigrated to Canada. Boats left in 1790, 1802, and 1826, carrying people to Quebec, Glengarry in Ontario, and the Strait of Canso in Nova Scotia respectively.

Swordland Lodge, on the northern shore of the loch, was used as training school STS 23b by the Special Operations Executive during the Second World War.

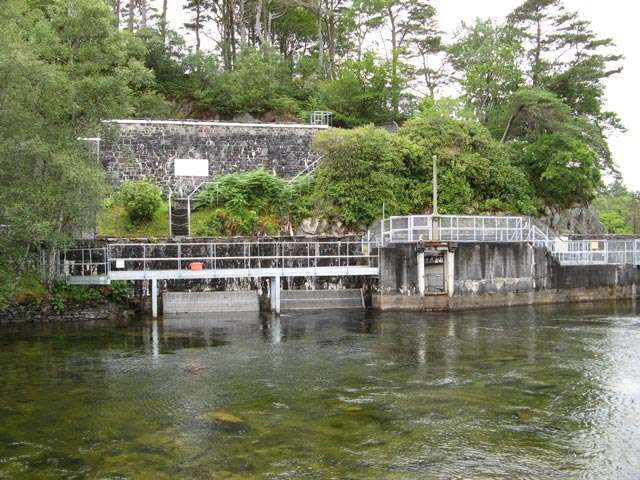
The hydroelectric power station on the River Morar

A 750 kW hydroelectric power station with a hydraulic head of 5.5 metres (18 ft) was built on the River Morar and commissioned in 1948.

== Geology ==
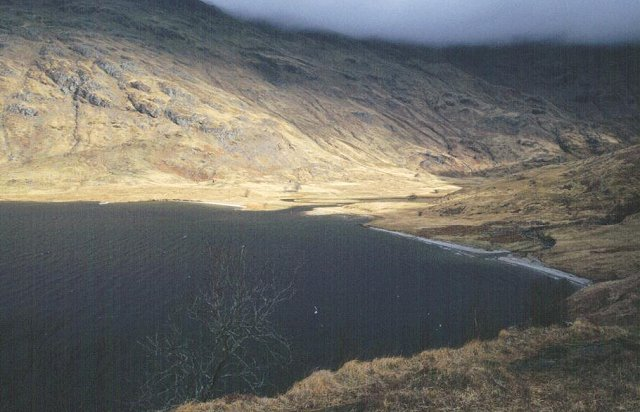
The eastern end of the loch

Loch Morar is located entirely within the Morar Group of sediments, which were deposited in the latter part of the Cambrian, and subsequently subjected to many phases of deformation.

The loch occupies a basin produced by the overdeepening of the valley by glacial erosion, along an east–west fault line. It is not a sea loch due to isostatic rebound that raised the rock sill at the end of the loch.

Based on estimates of erosion of between 2–4 mm (3/32–5/32 in) per year, the deep basin was created over a period of 67,000 – 150,000 years of glacial action, which occurred intermittently during the last million years of the Quaternary glaciation. An outwash fan made up of sand and gravels at the western end of the loch marks the limit of the re-advance in the Morar valley. Subsequently, colonised by vegetation and known as Mointeach Mhòr (the mossy plain), these deposits blocked the outflow of the loch to the south, so that it drained from the north-west corner instead.

The catchment area of the loch is 168 square kilometres (65 sq mi), and the geology is base-poor. A site to the north of the loch was selected in 2011 as a SSSI for its characteristic rock exposures of the Moine group by the Geological Conservation Review, replacing the area around Mallaig harbour, which had been previously regarded as the most representative site.

== Wildlife ==
The loch is surrounded by a mix of natural woodland, open hillside, sheep and cattle pasture and planted mixed coniferous and broadleaf woodlands. Only around 0.7% of the surface of the loch can be colonised by plants.

=== Fish ===
Loch Morar's fish population is believed to be limited to Atlantic Salmon, brown trout and sea trout, Arctic char, eel, stickleback, and minnow. Trout average around 340 g (3/4 lb) in size, but ferox trout of up to 7 kg (15 lb) have been caught. The loch is also known to contain eels, although none were caught in a recent survey of eel populations in Lochaber, suggesting that they prefer the loch to the tributaries surveyed. Catches of salmon and sea trout declined dramatically between the 1970s and 1980s, in common with other catchments on the west coast. Artificial stocking of the River Morar with salmon and sea trout was suspended in 2007 after the hatchery was closed.

The main salmonid spawning grounds are the River Meoble and the smaller burns that feed into the loch. The hydroelectric power station, which contain one of only two fish counters in Lochaber, is shut down during the smolt run, following a study on smolt mortality in 1992.

The catchment is managed by the Morar District Salmon Fishery Sub-board, which employs a full-time fisheries manager. Poaching in the form of netting has been known to occur at the mouth of the River Morar.
