= A830 road =

Road in the Scottish Highlands

Coordinates: 56.87842°N 5.48682°W

A830
- The road to the Isles
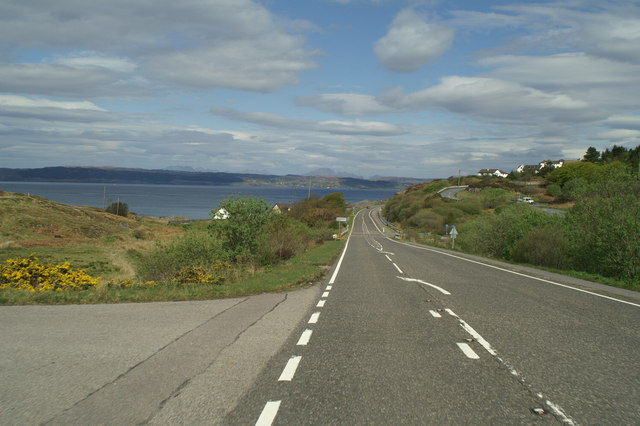
- The A830 between Arisaig and Mallaig

Route information
- Length: 46 mi (74 km)

Major junctions
- West end: Mallaig
- A82 A861
- East end: Fort William

Location
- Country: United Kingdom

Road network
- Roads in the United Kingdom; Motorways; A and B road zones
| ← A828 | → A831 |

The A830, also known as the Road to the Isles (though it forms only a part of the historic route) is a major road in Lochaber, Scottish Highlands. It connects the town of Fort William to the port of Mallaig.

== Route ==
The A830 is 46 miles long. Throughout its length, the road follows the route of the West Highland Line from Fort William to Mallaig. It starts at a junction on the A82 north of Fort William and immediately crosses the River Lochy over the Victoria Bridge. The road passes through several small settlements, including Corpach, Glenfinnan and Arisaig and bypasses the village of Morar. It also follows the shorelines of Loch Eil and Loch Eilt, and passes between a series of several glens between these.

The road ends at the quayside in the port of Mallaig adjacent to the railway station with onward ferry services to the isles of Muck, Eigg, Rùm, Canna, Skye and South Uist, and a ferry across to the neighbouring peninsula at Inverie which although on the mainland has no other road access.

== History ==
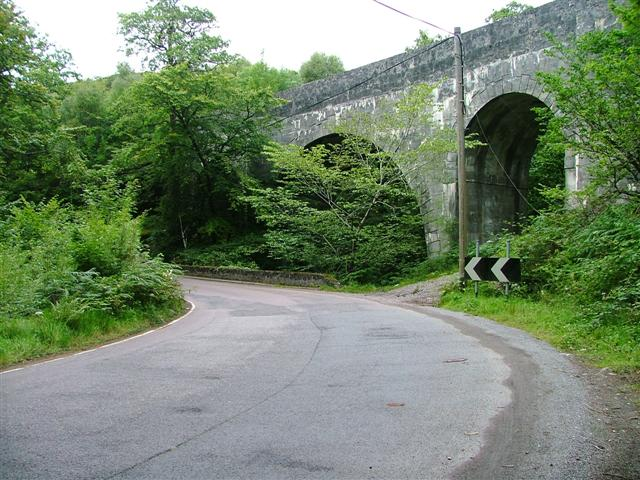
The A830 next to Larichmore Viaduct in 2005, when it was still a single-track road

The historic Road to the Isles is an ancient drove road which leaves General Wade's military road from Stirling to Inverness at Tummel Bridge, along the northern banks of the River Tummel and Loch Rannoch roughly along the present day B846. Where today's road runs out the old road continued over Rannoch Moor past Corrour Old Lodge towards Kings House on the A82, over the Devil's Staircase and past Kinlochleven, to meet the present A830 at Fort William.

Before the 19th century, there was no established road beyond Glenfinnan. The area beyond this to Mallaig was known as the Na Garbh-Chriochain (The Rough Bounds) and was part of the Lordship of the Isles of Clan Donald, then part of the estates of Clan Macdonald of Clanranald. In 1803, Thomas Telford campaigned for government funding to build a "Parliamentary Road" across the estate from Banavie and Corpach towards Arisaig. The road was described as the "Loch-na-Gaul" road.

The road was constructed by Thomas Telford in the early 19th century. It remained a single-track road throughout most of the 20th century, with the final section being upgraded in 2009. As the Road to the Isles, it has been celebrated as a historic part of Scottish culture.

In the late 1930s, a proposal was put forward in parliament to extend the A830 along the coast of the mainland as far as Kyle of Lochalsh. This was dismissed as being prohibitively expensive and of little practical use.

The road was predominantly single-track until the late 20th century. By 1954, a 6-long-ton (6.1 t) weight limit had been imposed on the road. while a report in 1965 showed there were still 30 miles (48 km) of single-track along the route. In 1969, the section between Craigag and Glenfinnan was upgraded to a two-way road and realigned in some places. A new bridge over the Caledonian Canal at Banavie was built the following year. The poor quality of the A830 enabled the West Highland Line to remain open; it was marked for closure in the Beeching Report but this was not done because it was impractical to run a replacement bus service along the parallel road. In August 1991, a group of protestors, organised by a local councillor, blockaded the road as a protest over lack of improvements.

In 2007, the road was assessed by the Institute of Advanced Motorists as being 1 of 11 roads in the UK having a "1 star" dangerous section along it. In April 2009, the final single-track section of A830 between Arisaig and Lochailort (the only such example left on a British trunk road) was bypassed by a modern replacement as part of a £23.4m upgrade. The 7.4-mile (11.9 km) bypassed section has been handed to the local authority for maintenance and designated the B8008.

== Culture ==
=== BBC programme Countryfile 2008 ===
On 25 May 2008 the road was featured in the BBC TV programme Countryfile.

=== Songs ===
There is a traditional Scottish song about the historic route of which the A830 forms part, called The Road to the Isles. The lyrics mention locations the route passes, including (in order of mention in the song): the Cuillin Hills, Tummel, Loch Rannoch, Lochaber, Shiel, Ailort, Morar, the Skerries and the Lews.

A satirical song about the road, "The 8-3-0," was written by Ian McCalman (of the Scottish folk group The McCalmans) and published in 1993, before the road's widening. The song lampoons the "single track" nature of the A-status road and depicts unsuspecting tourists dodging tourist buses and fish vans, and returning from Mallaig by train instead.
