= Aston House =

Building in Hertfordshire, England

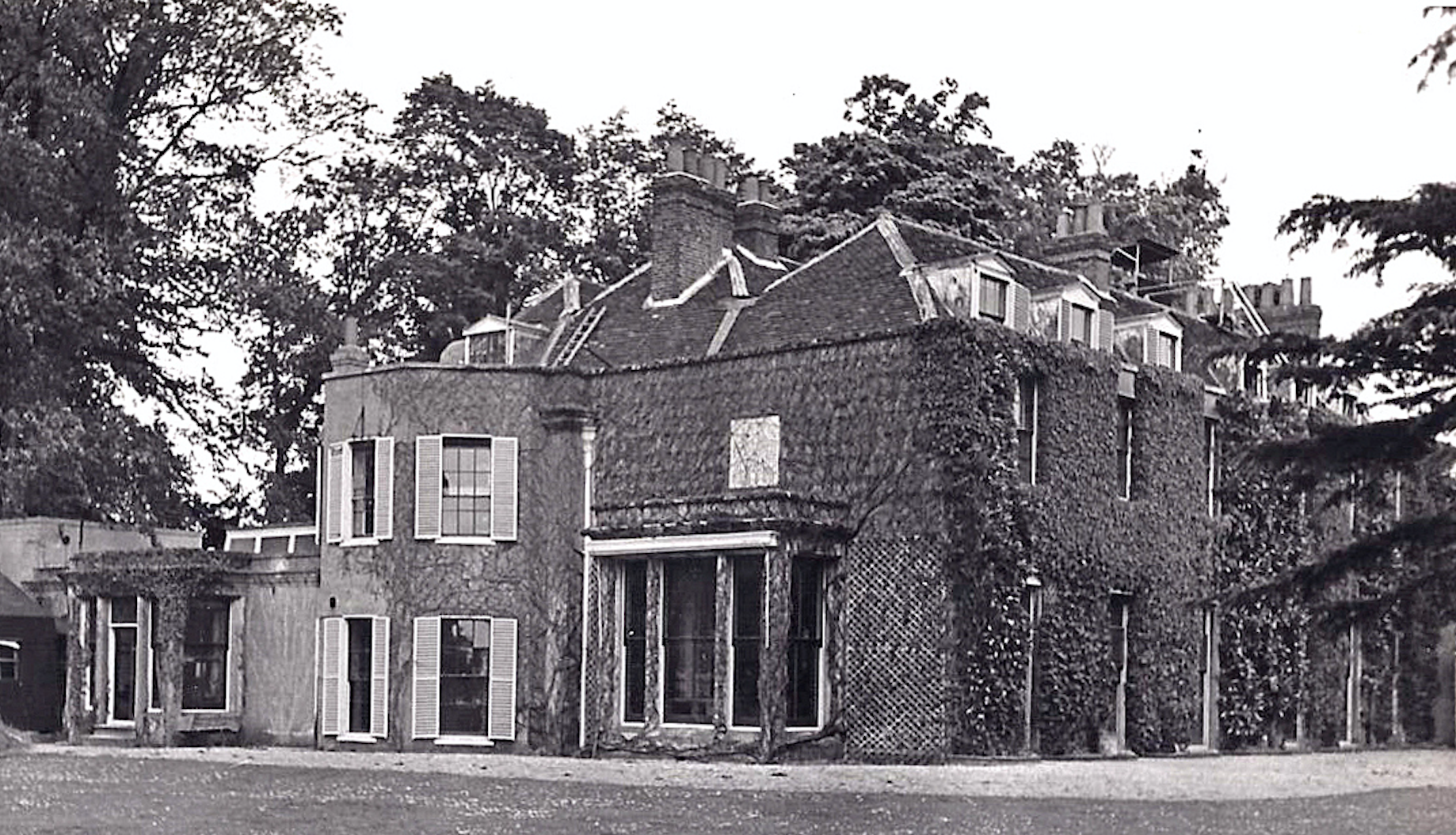
Aston House in the 1940s

Aston House was a prominent 17th-century residence with large parkland situated opposite the parish church in Aston, Hertfordshire in southern England. The house was demolished in 1961 by the Stevenage New Town Development Corporation after occupying it as its initial HQ. The site was developed and named Yeomans Drive in memory of Arthur Yeomans, the last owner in 1939 when it was requisitioned by the War Office. The adjoining parkland became Stevenage Golf and Conference Centre in April 1980.

== 1940s: SOE – Station XII E.S.6.(WD) ==
Aston House became the Research and Development Centre of sabotage explosives and weapons for the Special Operations Executive (SOE). Aston House was the first to experiment with plastic explosive for sabotage. The Commanding Officer at the House was Col. Leslie J. Cardew Wood a strong contender for the title of the original'Q' - 'Q' character in the James Bond films. for he developed bespoke weapons, tools and gadgets which were used in raids including Lofoten Islands, Dieppe, Norsk Heavy Water Plant, St-Nazaire and Prague. Aston House supplied special weapons to the Special Air Service (SAS), Special Boat Service (SBS), Long Range Patrol Unit (LRP), the Resistance Groups and the Commandos. The station was important in aiding the design and production of the Fairbairn–Sykes fighting knife. Production also included over 12 million No. 10 Time Delay pencil detonator and 38,500 Type 6 Limpet Mines, both made to original Aston House designs. Quality Control, Packaging and Dispatch was continuous and included supplying all the Home Guard Auxiliary Units and the Resistance Groups in Europe, reaching a peak around D-Day. Aston House took on responsibility for the total design, development and testing programme for the 'Sleeping Beauty' Motorised Submersible Canoe (MSC). One of the more exotic devices was the "explosive rat". The skinned rats were filled with plastic explosive and sewn up. The idea being to place the rats in coal near a boiler so that they would be thrown in with the coal and cause an explosion. Aston House weapons were also used in the assassination of Reinhard Heydrich. Among the many scientific personnel at the station were the inventor of the Number Ten Delay Switch ("timing pencil"), Lieutenant-Commander A.J.G. Langley S.I.S Secret Intelligence Service, ›Francis Arthur Freeth, Colin Meek and Cecil Vandepeer Clarke.

== Decline ==
The only remaining building is the coach house with clock tower on Yeoman's Drive, Aston.
