= MacAlpine =

MacAlpine, McAlpine, MacAlpin or McAlpin may refer to:

== People ==
- The Scottish House of Alpin
- Its claimed descendants, the Siol Alpin and/or Clan McAlpin(e)
- Kenneth MacAlpin, founder of said dynasty
- His brother and successor Domnall mac Ailpín
- The McAlpine baronets in the baronetage of the United Kingdom

=== In arts and entertainment ===
- Colin McAlpin, English composer
- Donald McAlpine (born 1934), Australian cinematographer
- Fiona McAlpine, British radio drama producer and director
- Jennie McAlpine (born 1984), British actress
- Katherine McAlpine (born 1985), American science writer and science rap performer
- Lizzy McAlpine (born 1999), American singer-songwriter
- Rachel McAlpine (born 1940), writer from New Zealand
- Tony MacAlpine (born 1960), American musician and composer
- Vic McAlpin (1918–1980), American songwriter
- William McAlpine (tenor) (1922–2004), Scottish tenor

=== In business ===
- Alfred David McAlpine (1881–1944), founder of the construction company Sir Alfred McAlpine & Son, son of Sir Robert McAlpine, 1st Baronet
- Alfred James McAlpine (1908–1991), British businessman, son of the above
- David Hunter McAlpin (1816–1901), American industrialist and real estate owner
- Edwin McAlpine, Baron McAlpine of Moffat (1907–1990), British construction magnate, son of Sir Robert McAlpine, 1st Baronet
- James McAlpin (1761–1847), American businessman and merchant
- Tom McAlpin (born 1954), American businessman, president and CEO of Virgin Voyages
- Sir William McAlpine, 6th Baronet (1936–2018), British businessman, older brother of Alistair

=== In government and politics ===
- Alistair McAlpine, Baron McAlpine (1942–2014), British politician
- Dave McAlpin, American judge and politician
- Donald McAlpine (politician) (1869–1925), Canadian politician
- Edwin A. McAlpin (1848–1917), General of the New York State Militia
- Frederick McAlpine, Bahamian politician
- Gerry McAlpine (born 1939), Canadian politician
- Joan McAlpine (born 1962), Scottish journalist and politician
- John McAlpine (1906–1984), New Zealand politician, Minister of Railways and Minister of Transport
- Joseph W. McAlpin (1900–1970), American politician
- Robin McAlpine (born 1972), Scottish campaigner, former director of the Common Weal think tank
- Steve McAlpine (born 1949), American lawyer and politician
- Tom McAlpine (1929–2006), Scottish politician

=== In sport ===
- C. McAlpine, 19th century footballer for Burslem Port Vale
- Chris McAlpine (born 1971), American National Hockey League player
- Ernie McAlpine (1902–1984), Australian rules footballer
- Hamish McAlpine (born 1948), Scottish football goalkeeper
- Ivan McAlpine (1907–1992), Australian rules footballer
- James McAlpine (1901–1975), Scottish footballer
- Jim McAlpine (1887–1948), Scottish footballer
- Keidane McAlpine (born 1975), American college soccer coach
- Kenneth McAlpine (chess player) (born 1945), Scottish chess master
- Kenneth McAlpine (cricketer) (1858–1923), English cricketer
- Kenneth McAlpine (1920–2023), British Formula 1 driver and team owner
- Rob McAlpine (born 1991), Scottish rugby player

=== In other fields ===
- Daniel McAlpine (1849–1932), Scottish mycologist
- David W. McAlpin (1945–2023), American linguist specializing in Elamite and Dravidian languages
- Douglas McAlpine (1890–1981), British neurologist, sixth son of Sir Robert McAlpine, 1st Baronet
- Harry McAlpin (1906–1985), American journalist
- Henry McAlpin (1777–1851), Scottish master builder and architect
- James Francis McAlpine (1922–2019), Canadian entomologist specialising in Diptera
- Joan McAlpine (born 1962), Scottish journalist and politician
- John Macalpine (died 1557), Scottish Protestant theologian
- Michael McAlpine, associate professor of mechanical engineering at the University of Minnesota
- Sir Robert McAlpine, 1st Baronet (1847–1934), British civil engineer, known as "Concrete Bob"
- Edwin McAlpine, Baron McAlpine of Moffat (1907–1990), British civil engineer, grandson of 1st Baronet
- William H. McAlpine (1847–1905), American Baptist minister and educator
- William J. McAlpine (1812–1890), American civil engineer
- Michael Todd McAlpin (born 1952), Commander of the Clan McAlpin(e)

== Fictional characters ==
- Jim McAlpine, socially intrepid protagonist of Morley Callaghan's novel the Loved and the Lost (1951)

== Places ==
- MacAlpine (house), a historic home in Maryland
- MacAlpine Hills, a range of hills in Antarctica
- McAlpin, Florida, in Suwannee County
- McAlpin, Harrison County, West Virginia
- McAlpin, Raleigh County, West Virginia
- Hotel McAlpin, a hotel in New York City
- McAlpin's, a former department store in Cincinnati, Ohio
- McAlpine Corners, a community in the township of Hastings Highlands, Ontario
- McAlpine Locks and Dam in Louisville, Kentucky
- McAlpine Mountain, a summit in North Carolina
- McAlpine Stadium, the former name of Kirklees Stadium in Huddersfield, England

== Geographical features ==
- MacAlpine Lake, in Nunavut, Canada

== Other ==
- MV Empire MacAlpine, a merchant aircraft carrier ship
- Tony MacAlpine (album), a music album by Tony MacAlpine
- McAlpin's Corps
- McAlpine's Fusiliers, an Irish ballad
- Sir Robert McAlpine, a British construction firm
- Alfred McAlpine, a defunct British construction firm
