= Robert McAlpine =

Rob or Robert McAlpine may refer to:

- Sir Robert McAlpine, 1st Baronet (1847–1934), Scottish businessman, founder of the construction company Sir Robert McAlpine Ltd.
- Robert Edwin McAlpine, Baron McAlpine of Moffat (1907–1990), British businessman, leader of the construction company Sir Robert McAlpine Ltd., grandson of Sir Robert
- Alistair McAlpine, Baron McAlpine of West Green (born Robert Alistair McAlpine, 1942–2014), British Conservative peer
- Sir Robert McAlpine, a construction company
- Rob McAlpine (born 1991), Scottish rugby player
