= Alfred McAlpine (disambiguation) =

Alfred McAlpine is a company.

Alfred McAlpine may also refer to:

- Alfred McAlpine Stadium
- Alfred McAlpine of the McAlpine baronets
- Alfred McAlpine (businessman) (1881–1944), founder of the construction company Sir Alfred McAlpine & Son
- Alfred James McAlpine (1908–1991), his son
