= Baron McAlpine =

Baron McAlpine may refer to:

- Edwin McAlpine, Baron McAlpine of Moffat (1907-1990), British construction magnate
- Alistair McAlpine, Baron McAlpine of West Green (1942-2014), British businessman, politician and author
