= Sir William McAlpine, 6th Baronet =

British businessman (1936–2018)

The Honourable Sir William Hepburn McAlpine Bt FRSE
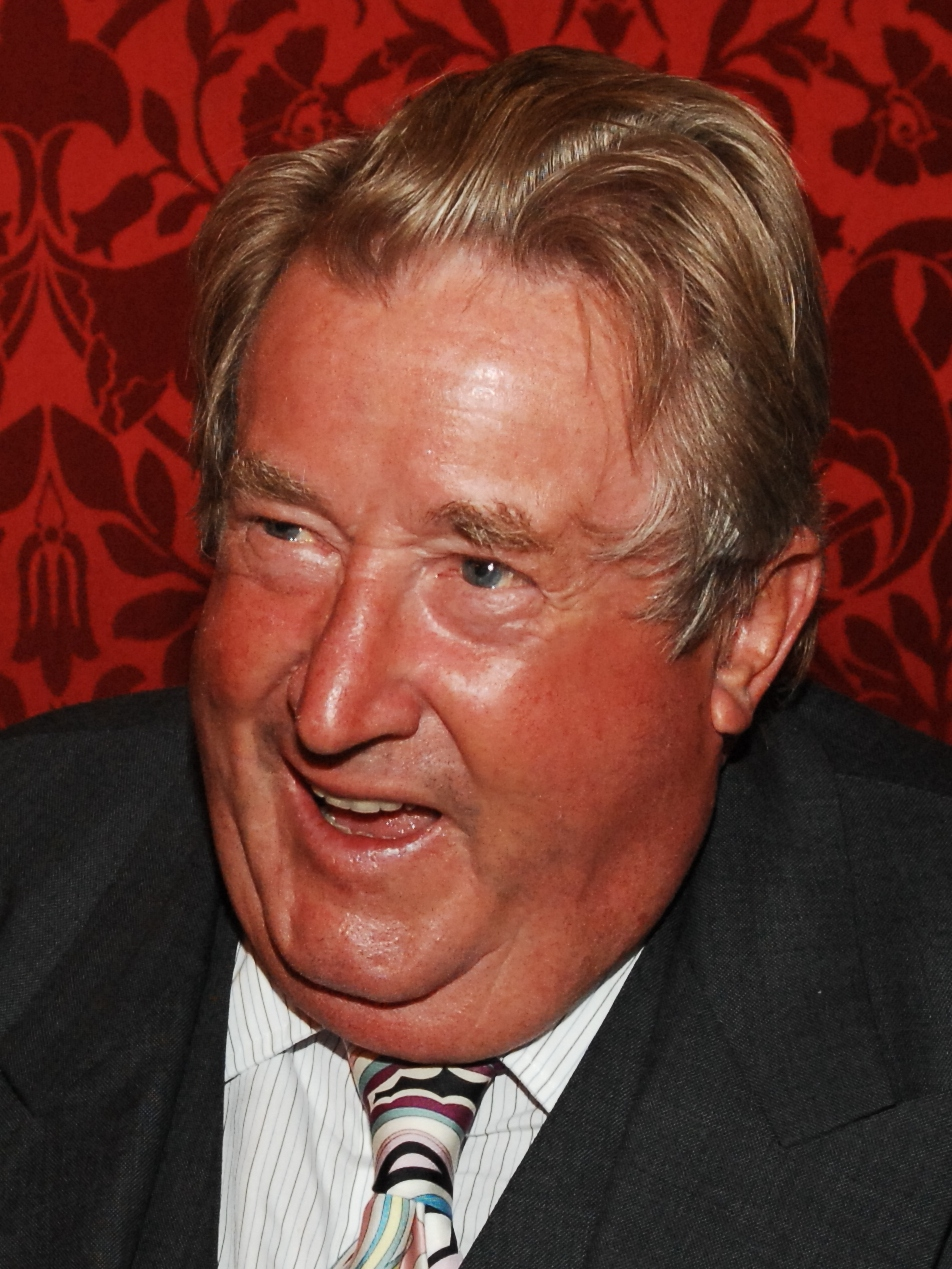
- Born: 12 January 1936; Dorchester Hotel, London, England
- Died: 4 March 2018 (aged 82)
- Occupation: Businessman
- Spouses: Jill Benton Jones (m. 1959; died 2004) Judith, Lady McAlpine (m. 2004)
- Children: 2

Sir William Hepburn McAlpine, 6th Baronet (12 January 1936 – 4 March 2018), was a British businessman who was director of the construction company Sir Robert McAlpine.

== Early life and career ==
Born in London in 1936 at the family-owned Dorchester Hotel, McAlpine was the oldest son of Sir Edwin McAlpine, 5th Bt (who was given a life peerage as Lord McAlpine of Moffat in 1980) by his marriage to Ella Mary Gardner Garnett. His great-grandfather was "Concrete Bob", Sir Robert McAlpine, the first of the McAlpine baronets and the founder of the construction company. He had two younger brothers Alistair McAlpine, Baron McAlpine of West Green and David McAlpine.

Brought up at the family home in Surrey and educated at Charterhouse, McAlpine joined the family firm from school, starting his career at the Hayes Depot in Middlesex, a 30-acre (120,000 m^{2}) site which housed the McAlpine railway locomotive and wagon fleet. The years after the Second World War were a busy time for the construction industry.

He did his National Service in the Life Guards for two years from 1954.

In 1973, McAlpine purchased the historic British 4472 Flying Scotsman steam locomotive, saving it from possible demise and repatriating it from the United States two years after a U.S. tour which had bankrupted its previous owner, Alan Pegler. Sir William maintained and ran the locomotive as a service to the British public and international steam community until the mid-1990s, when it was purchased by steam enthusiast Tony Marchington.

In 1990, on the death of his father, McAlpine inherited his baronetcy and became Sir William. He was patron of the Clan MacAlpine Society. He served as High Sheriff of Buckinghamshire for 1999. He was a director and trustee of the educational charity Shiplake Court Limited.

In 2007 McAlpine was president of the Smeatonian Society of Civil Engineers to which he had been elected a member in 1985.

He was also the president of the Railway Benevolent Institution, known as the Railway Benefit Fund, a charity helping current and retired railway industry workers.

== Railway preservation ==
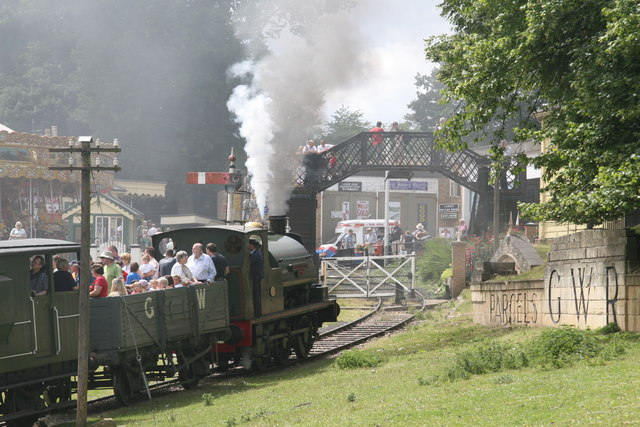
A 1913 Hudswell Clarke 0-6-0 ST steam locomotive on the Fawley Hill Railway. It was delivered to Sir Robert McAlpine and used on a series of major projects including Wembley Stadium.

An acknowledged railway enthusiast, McAlpine returned to Hayes depot during the Beeching Axe to find that the company's Hudswell Clarke 0-6-0ST No.31 was for sale for £100. He purchased the locomotive, and moved it to his country estate home. This marked the start in 1961 of the 4 ft 8 1/2 in (1,435 mm) standard gauge Fawley Hill Railway, a private railway which now runs to over a mile long and has the steepest gradient at 1:13 on a British railway.

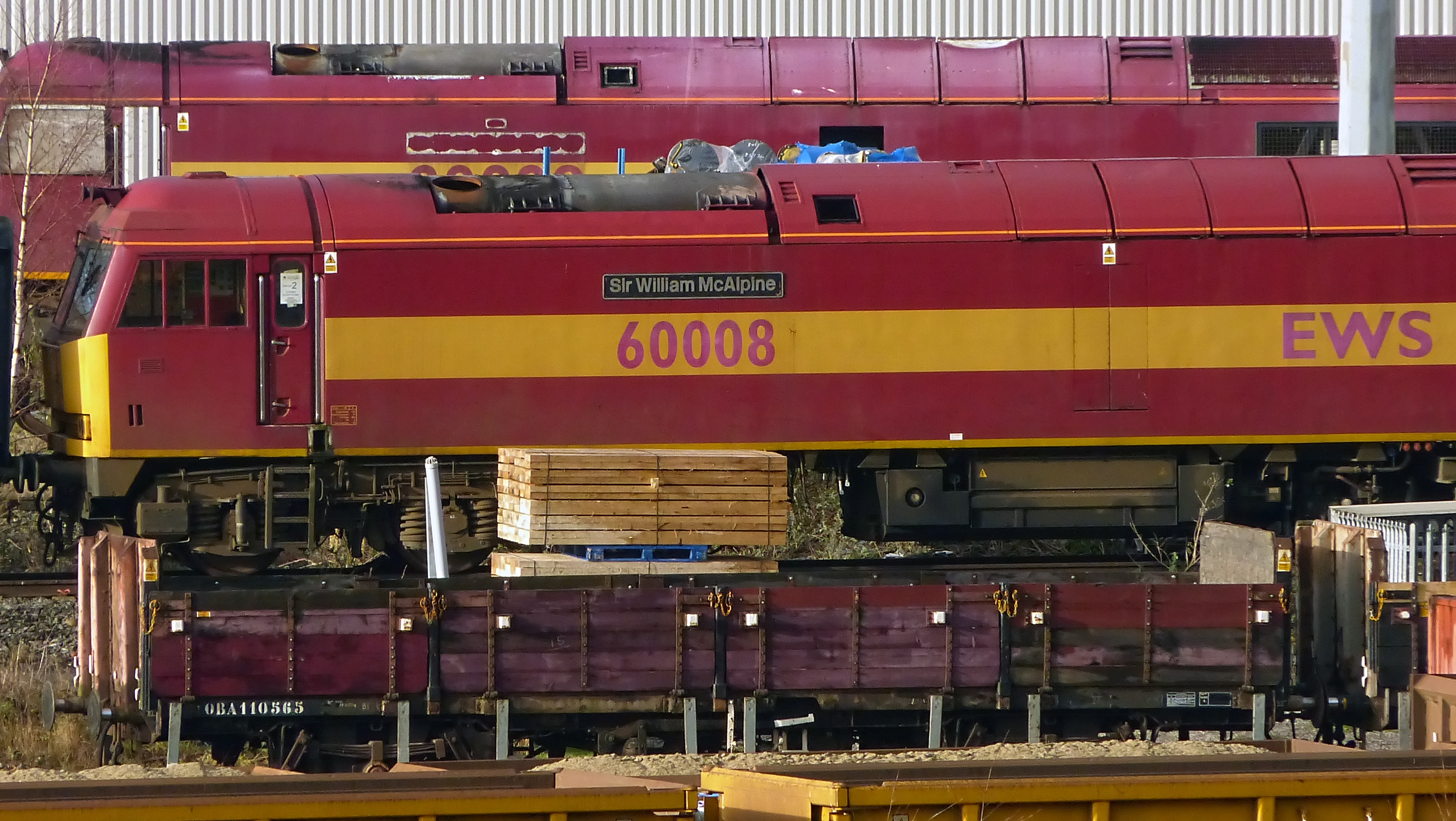
Sir William McAlpine nameplate on 60008 at Toton TMD

After starting Fawley Hill Railway, McAlpine purchased 4079 Pendennis Castle in partnership with John Gretton, which was subsequently housed at Market Overton in Rutland. After being moved to Steamtown, it was sold to Rio Tinto and moved to Australia. In January 1973 McAlpine purchased 4472 Flying Scotsman after a financially disastrous tour of North America, to save it from sale to an American consortium.

McAlpine became involved in a plan to save the Romney, Hythe & Dymchurch Railway (RH&DR) and became its chairman. After the efforts of Peter Beet to preserve Carnforth LMS 10(A) shed, McAlpine bought shares in 1970, and then took the controlling interest from 1974 until 1987 in the visitor attraction that became Steamtown. McAlpine chaired the RH&DR, the Dart Valley Railway, and established and chaired the Railway Heritage Trust.

McAlpine was also a Patron of the Swanage Railway Trust, as well as President of the Transport Trust, the charity dedicated to the preservation of all modes of transport and its infrastructure.

Three locomotives have been named Sir William McAlpine; Ruston 48 No.294266, once owned by Sir William himself and now owned by YouTuber Lawrie's Mechanical Marvels, EWS's 60008 and DB Cargo UK's 90028.

== Personal life ==
McAlpine's first wife Jill Benton Jones, whom he married on 31 October 1959, died on 9 February 2004. They had two children:

- Sir Andrew William McAlpine, 7th Baronet (born 22 November 1960)
- Lucinda Mary Jane McAlpine (born 19 June 1964)

He married his second wife, Judith, whom he had known for many years, on 25 March 2004 at the restored station on his private railway.

He died after months of illness on 4 March 2018 and was succeeded in the baronetcy by his son.

Baronetage of the United Kingdom
Preceded by (Robert) Edwin McAlpine	Baronet (of Knott Park); 1990–2018	Succeeded by Andrew William McAlpine
