= Alfred James McAlpine =

Alfred James McAlpine (15 June 1908 – 6 November 1991), not to be confused with Baron McAlpine, was a member of the noted Anglo-Scottish construction-based McAlpine family, the son of Sir Alfred David McAlpine and the grandson of Sir Robert McAlpine, 1st Baronet. He usually went by his middle name of James or Jimmie.

== Career ==
After leaving Repton School, he joined the family business Sir Robert McAlpine, under his father who ran operations in Northwest England. In 1935, following the death of Sir Robert and his eldest son, Alfred ran the northwest independently, although the legal separation was not completed until 1940, when Sir Alfred McAlpine & Son was formed. Under a non-compete agreement with its former parent company, Sir Alfred McAlpine confined itself to civil engineering and to the northwest of England. James became chairman of the company after the death of his father in 1944.

Under James's chairmanship, Alfred McAlpine floated on the London Stock Exchange in 1958 under the name Marchwiel Holdings, only changing its public name to Alfred McAlpine PLC in 1985. This followed the decision in 1983 to end the non-compete agreement with Robert McAlpine allowing the firm to expand geographically. In 1985, James retired, and handed over chairmanship of the company to his son Robert James "Bobby" McAlpine.

== Family ==
McAlpine was married five times and had four children. He lived at Gerwyn Hall in the village of Marchwiel near Wrexham, Denbighshire, and played cricket for Denbighshire in the Minor Counties Championship between 1930 and 1935, mostly on the cricket ground at his father's nearby home.

== Car collection ==
A noted car collector, he kept and maintained his large private collection in the various outbuildings of the hall. The collection included example models from: Alvis, Aston Martin, Bentley, Bristol, Bugatti, Jaguar, Jensen and Rolls-Royce. He and his chauffeur's preferred mode of transport was a 1934 V12 engined Hispano-Suiza J12, which was often seen at Wrexham Golf Club where he was president.

== Death ==
McAlpine died in hospital at Wrexham in 1991.

== Sources ==
- Gray, Tony (1987). The Road to Success: Alfred McAlpine 1935 - 1985. Rainbird Publishing.
