= Alvito =

Alvito may refer to:

== People ==
- Alvito Nunes (died 1015), count of Portugal
- Alvito (bishop of León) (died 1063)
- Alvito D'Cunha (born 1978), retired Indian footballer
- Alvito Rodrigues (born 1982), Indian footballer

== Places ==
=== Italy ===
- Alvito, Lazio, a comune in the Province of Frosinone
- Duchy of Alvito, a fiefdom in the Kingdom of Naples, now part of Lazio

=== Portugal ===
- Alvito, Portugal, a municipio in Beja District, Alentejo
- Alvito (São Pedro e São Martinho) e Couto, civil parish in the municipality of Barcelos in the district of Braga, Portugal
- Alvite (Cabeceiras de Basto), former civil parish in the municipality of Cabeceiras de Basto, Portugal
- Alvito Dam, Portugal
