= McAlpine baronets =

Baronetcy in the Baronetage of the United Kingdom

The McAlpine Baronetcy, of Knott Park in the County of Surrey, is a title in the Baronetage of the United Kingdom. It was created in 1918 for Robert McAlpine, a Scottish civil engineer and the founder of Sir Robert McAlpine Ltd.

== McAlpine baronets, of Knott Park (1918) ==
- Sir Robert McAlpine, 1st Baronet (1847–1934)
- Sir Robert McAlpine, 2nd Baronet (1868–1934)
- Sir Alfred Robert McAlpine, 3rd Baronet (1907–1968)
- Sir Thomas George Bishop McAlpine, 4th Baronet (1901–1983)
- Sir (Robert) Edwin McAlpine, 5th Baronet (1907–1990) (created Baron McAlpine of Moffat in 1980)
- Sir William Hepburn McAlpine, 6th Baronet (1936–2018)
- Sir Andrew William McAlpine, 7th Baronet (born 1960)

The heir apparent is the present holder's son, Frederick William Edwin McAlpine (born 1993)

== Other family members ==
Several other members of the McAlpine family have also gained distinction:

- Sir Malcolm McAlpine (1877–1967), third son of the 1st Baronet, was chairman of the family firm and a noted racehorse owner. His son, Sir Robin McAlpine (1906–1993), was also chairman of the firm and a prominent racehorse owner.
- Sir Alfred McAlpine (1881–1944), fourth son of the 1st Baronet, established his own construction firm (Alfred McAlpine plc) in 1935.
- Douglas McAlpine (1890–1981), sixth son of the 1st Baronet, was a distinguished neurologist. His son Christopher McAlpine (1919–2008) was a diplomat and banker.
- Edwin McAlpine, the second son of the second son of the 1st Baronet, ran the family firm during its highly successful period creating nuclear power stations and was created a life peer as Baron McAlpine of Moffat in 1980 before succeeding as 5th Baronet in 1983.
- Alistair McAlpine, second son of the 5th Baronet, was created a life peer as Baron McAlpine of West Green in 1984.
