= Caucasian Common Market =

The Caucasian Common Market (founded in 1997) was a private holding company created to bring prosperity and well-being to the North Caucasus, and in addition, its recognition by the world community as an important subject of international commodity exchange and, consequently, international law.

Among the company's co-founders were former Chechen mafia boss and Chechen First Deputy Premier Khozh-Ahmed Noukhaev and Lord Alistair McAlpine, Baron McAlpine, of the Goldsmith family interests in London. The company's aim was to collect US$3 billion as the initial capital for investment projects in the region.

Excerpt from Forbes Russian Editor Paul Klebnikov Conversation with a Barbarian: Interviews with a Chechen Field Commander on Banditry and Islam:

"In his official biography Khozh-Ahmed Noukhayev a.k.a. "Hozha" reports that appeared in Moscow in 1974. According to him, he joined the Faculty of Moscow State University, although the degree never received. In 1980 e Nuhaev became one of the leaders of the Chechen community Chechen mafia in Moscow. Several times sitting.

Freed at last from prison in 1991, Noukhayev engaged in politics, approached the Chechen president Dzhokhar Dudayev, conducted clandestine financial transactions for obschaka independent Ichkeria. In 1994, when federal troops entered Chechnya, Hozha took part in the defense of Grozny. In January 1995 the first was wounded in the battles for the presidential palace - he still walks with a limp and a cane. After treatment in Turkey assumed the post of the Deputy Prime Minister Zelimkhan Yandarbiyev. In early 1997, the political situation in Chechnya has changed is not in favor of Khozh-Ahmed Noukhayev. Was elected president of Chechnya Aslan Maskhadov, who appointed his prime minister known field commander Shamil Basayev. Khozh-Ahmed Noukhayev decided to leave - he lived in Istanbul, in Baku, where he had bank accounts and their homes. Engaged in what is ridiculous economic projects (under the name Caucasian Common Market), opened a representative office in Kiev, Warsaw, Brussels, London, Washington, Houston and Tokyo. The idea was tempting: to create the Common Market of independent peoples of the North Caucasus and connect it to the world economy. Preaching to the idea, as well as the economic independence of Chechnya, Nuhaev in 1997, met with Margaret Thatcher, the former secretary of Homeland Security Zbigniew Brzezinski, a former U.S. Secretary of State James Baker, chairman of the World Bank James Wolfensohn. Advisory council organization «Caucasian Common Market» led the first president of the European Bank for Reconstruction and Development, Jacques Attali.

The outbreak of the Second Chechen War in 1999 meant the definitive end of this initiative.
