= Nikolay Suleimanov =

Chechen mafia boss (1955–1994)

- Николай Сулейманов
- A mugshot of Suleimanov
- Born: 6 October 1955; Kazakh Soviet Socialist Republic, Soviet Union (now Kazakhstan)
- Died: December 1994 (aged 39)
- Known for: Chechen mafia boss

Nikolay Suleimanov (Russian: Николай Сулейманов; 6 October 1955 – 22 December 1994) nicknamed "Khoza" and "Ruslan", was a Chechen mafia leader active in the 1980s and 1990s.

== Life ==
Suleimanov was born in Kazakhstan during the years of internal deportation, from the Guchingi teip. Living in the Chechen capital Grozny, he was one of the leaders of the Chechen mafia in the late Soviet period and the early years of Chechnya’s self-declared independence following the collapse of the Soviet Union in December 1991. He was also the boss of the Suleimanov clan.

Suleimanov came to Moscow in the early 1980s and helped Khozh-Ahmed Noukhaev and Movladi Atlangeriyev to set up Chechen gangs. By 1986, his group controlled Moscow's Southern River Port, the largest car market in the capital, and specialized in racketeering the "New Russian" class. Following a turf war in 1988–89, the Chechen alliance, nominally controlled by ‘Musa the Older’, managed to force some of the top rival criminal organizations completely out of the city and assume a dominant position in Moscow. In 1990, he was sentenced to four years in prison, but was released two years later.

In 1993, he went with his men to Chechnya, where he was joined by the charismatic gangster-turned-rebel Ruslan Labazanov and took part in a coup attempt against Chechen President Dzhokhar Dudayev. After having been seriously wounded during a demonstration-turned-shootout in the center of Grozny, he was taken into government custody. Suleimanov subsequently left the separatist republic and returned to Moscow.

"Khoza" was reportedly shot dead in December 1994, shortly before the outbreak of First Chechen War, at one of his businesses, the 7th Car Service Station in Moscow, by a contract killer sent by the Russian mafia. His position was taken over by "Aslan" and "Lechi the Beard". It was one of a series of high-profile gangland murders that marked the beginning of another turn of major mafia bloodletting in 1995–1996.
