= Khozh-Ahmed Noukhayev =

Chechen gangster and politician (born 1954)

Noukhayev in Moscow

Khozh-Ahmed Tashtamirovich Noukhayev (Russian: Хож-Ахмет Таштамирович Нухаев; born November 11, 1954 – presumed dead in 2004), also known as Khozha, was a Chechen gangster and politician.

== Early life ==
He was born on November 11, 1954, in exile (due to the Deportation of the Chechens and Ingush), in Chuy Region, Kirghizia, into the Yalkhoi teip (clan) from the Geldagan village in Shalinsky District of Chechnya. He arrived in Moscow in 1974 and matriculated into Moscow State University, Faculty of Law. Along with Said-Khasan Abumuslimov (later Vice-President of Chechnya under Zelimkhan Yandarbiyev) he organized an underground committee for the liberation of Chechnya called Obshina. The committee studied books by Abdurakhman Avtorkhanov, Aleksandr Solzhenitsyn, and Andrei Sakharov. According to Noukhaev, Abumuslimov was responsible for politics and information while he took care of financial matters and weapons. In 1980, Nukhaev was sentenced to eight years for banditry, which he claimed were actually for political reasons. During this time, he acquired the nickname “Khozha” and was considered a boss of the Chechen mafia along with Nikolay Suleimanov. By 1987, Chechen criminals had developed into a well-organized community under Nukhayev and Suleimanov, the group tried to force the most influential Russian Mafia gangs (the Lyubertsy, Solntsevo, and Balashikha) out of Moscow which allowed the Chechens to occupy the dominant position for some time.

== Activities during the Second Chechen War ==
Soon after the start of the Second Chechen War, Nukhaev left for Baku, Azerbaijan, and financed the underground Chechen newspapers Ichkeria and Mekh-kell. In 1999, he made a public statement calling for an international commission to bring peace to Chechnya, saying Russia will never gain its objectives by military means because the Chechen people's will for self-determination is such that guerrilla warfare will continue for years. Noukhaev said the first step in the peace process should be establishment of an International Commission headed by such respected world figures as former President Jimmy Carter or former UN Secretary General Boutros Boutros-Ghali to oversee the freeing of illegally detained persons on both sides. It is believed by some that he also helped finance the militant groups of Ruslan Gelayev and Aslambek Abdulkhadzhiev. In 2001, Nukhaev first proposed the controversial idea (among both his allies and enemies) of splitting Chechnya into a northern Russian half and a southern de facto, but not de jure Ichkerian half. That same year Nukhaev founded the inter-teip movement Nokhchi-Latta-Islam, and politician Aleksandr Dugin was also working with him during this time.

== Book by Paul Klebnikov ==
Noukhaev was the subject of a book entitled Conversation with a Barbarian: Interviews with a Chechen Field Commander on Banditry and Islam by the late American/Russian journalist Paul Klebnikov. The book is based on interviews with Noukhaev conducted by Klebnikov in Baku, Azerbaijan. In it, Noukhaev discusses his past, including his involvement in criminal activities in Moscow and creating Caucasian Common Market. He also argues for the superiority of the Chechen and Islamic clan/tribal-based social system, while Klebnikov argues for an opposite position. After Klebnikov's murder in Moscow in 2004, it was alleged that Noukhaev had ordered the killing in retaliation for his negative portrayal in this book. Several Chechens were charged with carrying out the killing on Noukhayev's orders but all were subsequently acquitted at trial.

== Political activities in Russia ==
After April 2001, he became actively involved in work of Eurasia Party led by Russian nationalist Aleksandr Dugin, despite being officially wanted by police. On June 28, 2001, he appeared on the Dugin party's press conference in Moscow to propose that Chechnya be divided into North Chechnya (the plains region within the frame of the Russian Federation) and South Chechnya (the mountain region largely independent from Russia, but still closely bonded to Russia and fiercely hostile to "Wahhabism", that is Islamic fundamentalism).

== Possible death in the mountains of Dagestan ==
Khozh-Akhmed Noukhaev stayed in Azerbaijan for an extended period of time following the outbreak of the Second Chechen War. It is from there that he posted updates to the internet site named after him, noukhaev.com. According to some sources, Noukhaev secretly returned to Chechnya in late 2003. He supposedly convinced Ruslan Gelayev to cross Dagestan into Georgia and was with a group of Gelayev's fighters when they were surrounded in the mountains during the winter of 2003–2004. Gelayev's men were taken captive or killed, and on February 28, 2004, Gelayev himself was killed in a firefight with border guards. Several sources speculate that Noukhaev was killed alongside the fighters. In support of this is the circumstantial evidence that both Ichkeria and Mekh-Kell are no longer being published. Furthermore, there have been no new book-brochures by Noukhaev about Russian-Chechen and international relations, or promoting of his opinions on the future of Chechnya. These book-brochures were brought from Azerbaijan and could sometimes still be found in the markets of Grozny and Nazran in 2005.

== See also ==
- List of fugitives from justice who disappeared
