= Mapeley =

Mapeley Limited
- Company type: Privately held company
- Industry: Property
- Founded: 1999
- Defunct: 2023
- Fate: Voluntary liquidation
- Headquarters: Guernsey, United Kingdom Overseas Territories
- Key people: Wes Edens (Chairman); Mark J. Smith (CEO)
- Website: www.mapeley.com

Mapeley Limited was a Guernsey-based outsourcing and property investment business. It was previously listed on the London Stock Exchange and constituent of the FTSE 250 Index.

== History ==
The company was founded in 1999. In 2001, it entered into an outsourcing contract with HM Revenue & Customs taking over 600 buildings and leasing them back to Inland Revenue under a private finance initiative (PFI) deal.

In 2000 it purchased a portfolio of properties from Abbey and then leased them back again to Abbey. Then in 2006 it secured a major outsourcing contract from the Identity and Passport Service.

The company was listed on the London Stock Exchange in 2005, before being delisted in 2009 after facing significant headwinds and poor share price performance.

In 2023, the company was put into voluntary liquidation and FTI took charge as liquidators.

== Operations ==
The company had operations organised as follows:

- Outsourcing - contracts with HM Revenue & Customs, Abbey and the Identity and Passport Service
- Direct property investments - individual property portfolios
