= Alfred McAlpine =

British construction company

- Company type: Public
- Industry: Construction; Business services
- Founded: 1935
- Defunct: 2008
- Fate: Acquired
- Successor: Carillion
- Headquarters: Hooton, Cheshire
- Key people: Roger Urwin, (Chairman); Ian Grice, (CEO)
- Number of employees: 8,600 (2008)

Alfred McAlpine plc was a British construction firm headquartered in Hooton, Cheshire. It was listed on the London Stock Exchange until it was acquired by Carillion in 2008.

The origins of Alfred McAlpine are strongly associated with the businessman Alfred McAlpine, a son of 'Concrete' Bob McAlpine, and the north western operations of Sir Robert McAlpine. These operations became legally distinct in 1940; 18 year later, the company was floated on the London Stock Exchange under the name Marchwiel Holdings. By this point, Jimmie McAlpine was the chairman of the company, a position he would hold until 1985. Prior to 1983, the company's operations were constrained by a non-compete agreement with Sir Robert McAlpine; while the geographical restriction was removed, some terms of agreement remained in effect between the two companies.

Throughout the second half of the twentieth century, Alfred McAlpine was a major road builder, being responsible for the construction of over 10% of Britain's motorways, including the M6 Toll (as part of the CAMBBA consortium). During the 1980s, it expanded its presence in the home building sector; by the late 1990s, McAlpine was building over 4,000 houses per year. However, the company opted to sell its homebuilding operations to rival company George Wimpey in August 2001. It also owned and operated Penrhyn Quarry, the country's largest slate works; a major accounting scandal at the company's slate subsidiary occurred during the mid-2000s. During February 2008, Alfred McAlpine was acquired by rival company Carillion in exchange for £572m, which made Carillion the biggest support services company in Britain at that time.

== History ==
Alfred McAlpine was one of the sons of 'Concrete' Bob McAlpine and he ran the operations of Sir Robert McAlpine in the north west of England. In 1935, following the death of Sir Robert and his eldest son, Alfred ran the north west independently, although the legal separation was not completed until 1940, when Sir Alfred McAlpine & Son was formed. Under a non-compete agreement with its former parent company, Sir Alfred McAlpine confined itself to civil engineering and to the north west of England.

After the death of its founder, his son Jimmie McAlpine became chairman of the business. During 1958, the company was floated on the London Stock Exchange under the name Marchwiel Holdings, changing its public name to Alfred McAlpine PLC only in 1985. This move came two years after the decision to end the non-compete agreement with Robert McAlpine, allowing the firm to expand geographically. However, some terms agreed by between the two companies were allegedly still in effect, a matter that would lead to legal action being taken into the 21st century.

McAlpine's status as a civil engineer was enhanced during the 1960s by its participation in the motorway building programme and the company became one of the country's leading civil engineers. There had been some limited diversification, including the purchase of Penrhyn Quarry, the country's largest slate works. This slate was occasionally used in the business' other activities. As the civil engineering market declined in the 1970s, McAlpine sought to diversify further into private housebuilding. Acquisitions included Price Brothers in 1978, Frank Sanderson's Finlas in 1982 and Canberra in 1988. Investments had also been made in the US housing industry. By the end of the 1980s, private housebuilding was contributing the major part of the group's profits.

During 1985, Jimmie retired, and handed over chairmanship of the company to his son Robert James "Bobby" McAlpine. In 1991, Bobby brought in an outside chief executive and resigned as chairman one year later, by which time the family no longer owned a controlling shareholding in the business. Under new management, there was further concentration on private housebuilding, including the acquisition of Raine Industries. By the late 1990s, McAlpine was building over 4,000 houses per year and was one of the industry's top ten.

During the mid-1990s, rival British construction firm Amec Foster Wheeler made an all-share offer to merge with Alfred McAlpine; however, the latter's board voted against the move.

By the turn of the century, there was increasing speculation over the future of the company and, in August 2001, Alfred McAlpine sold its housebuilding operations to rival company George Wimpey in exchange for £461m, after which McAlpine announced plans to return in excess of £100m to its shareholders during the following years. Later that same year, it acquired Kennedy Utility Management for £52m. In 2002, the business acquired Stiell, a facilities management and information technology network systems business, for £85m. In May 2006, Alfred McAlpine commenced its largest ever facilities and building management services contract for Mapeley's entire UK property portfolio; by this point, 75 percent of the company's activities was in the private sector.

During February 2007, the company took a £13m hit after serious accounting irregularities were discovered that were later attributed to the deliberate collusion of several managers at its slate business across multiple years. Several former managers later admitted to charges of fraud related to this incident. It was speculated that Alfred McAlpine may have to part with its slate activities entirely.

During October 2007, reports emerged that two takeover bids made by rival company Carillion had been rejected by Alfred McAlpine. In February 2008, Carillion acquired the company in exchange for £572m, even though this amount was less than Carillion had originally offered for the firm. The move, which made Carillion the biggest support services company in Britain, quickly led to the selling off various parts of the former company being initiated that same year.

== Structure ==
It had three business streams:

- Business Services: facilities management, information systems, asset management and health and safety management.
- Project Services: the Special Projects unit was involved a broad range of commercial, industrial, leisure, educational and medical facilities and the civil engineering unit was focused primarily on road building.
- Infrastructure Services: maintenance, renewal and development services to utility operators in the gas, electricity, water and telecoms sectors and roads maintenance services to local government.

It also owned Alfred McAlpine Slate, which was the world's largest producer of natural slate.

== Major projects ==
Projects undertaken by the company included:

- an engine factory for the Bristol Aeroplane Company at Hawthorn completed in 1943
- the Royal Liverpool University Hospital completed in 1969
- the Scammonden Dam completed in 1970
- New Cross Hospital in Wolverhampton completed in 1970
- the Alvito Dam in Portugal completed in 1976
- Dinorwig Power Station completed in 1984
- Manchester Central completed in 1986
- Devonshire Dock Hall in Barrow-in-Furness completed in 1986
- the Jackfield Bridge completed in 1994
- the Royal Armouries Museum in Leeds completed in 1996
- the Kirklees Stadium in Huddersfield completed in 1997 (known commercially as the McAlpine Stadium until 2004)
- the Brick Community Stadium in Wigan completed in 1999
- the Eden Project in St Austell completed in 2001
- Wythenshawe Hospital completed in 2001
- Hereford County Hospital completed in 2002
- the M6 Toll completed in 2003
- the redevelopment of Stoke Mandeville Hospital completed in 2006
- the new elective care facility for Addenbrooke's Hospital completed in 2007
- Bluestone Holiday Complex completed in 2008
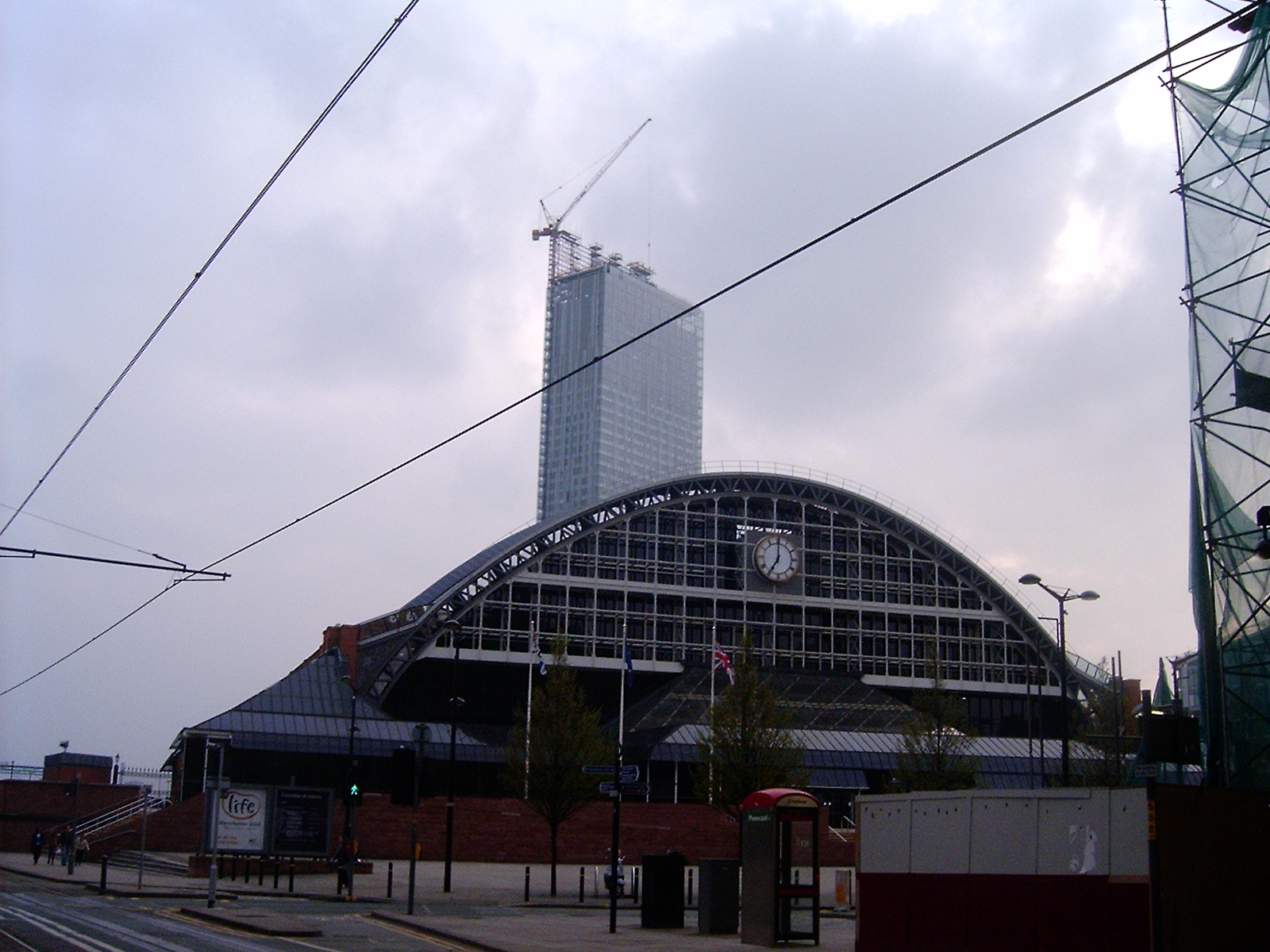
Manchester Central

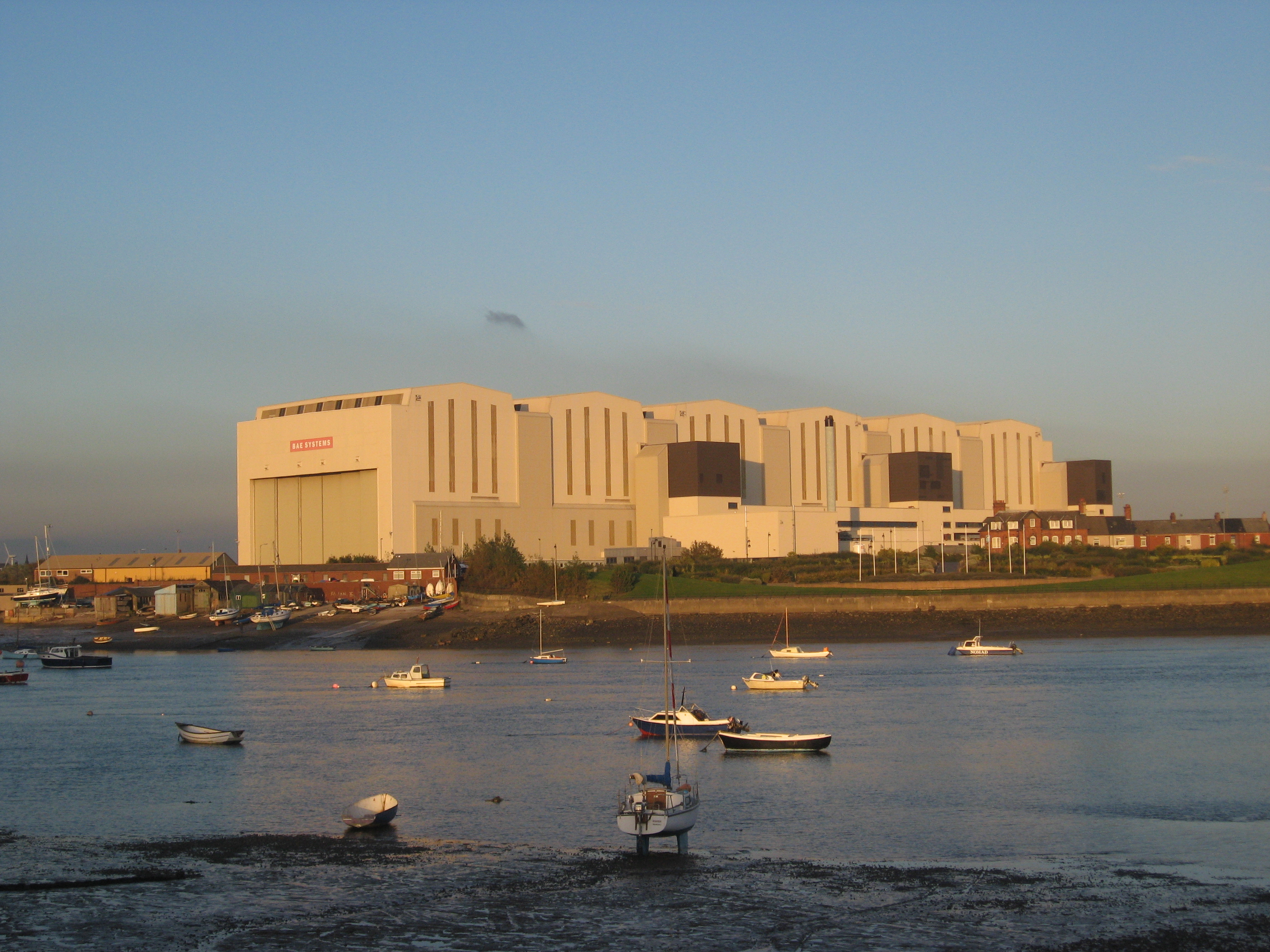
Devonshire Dock Hall

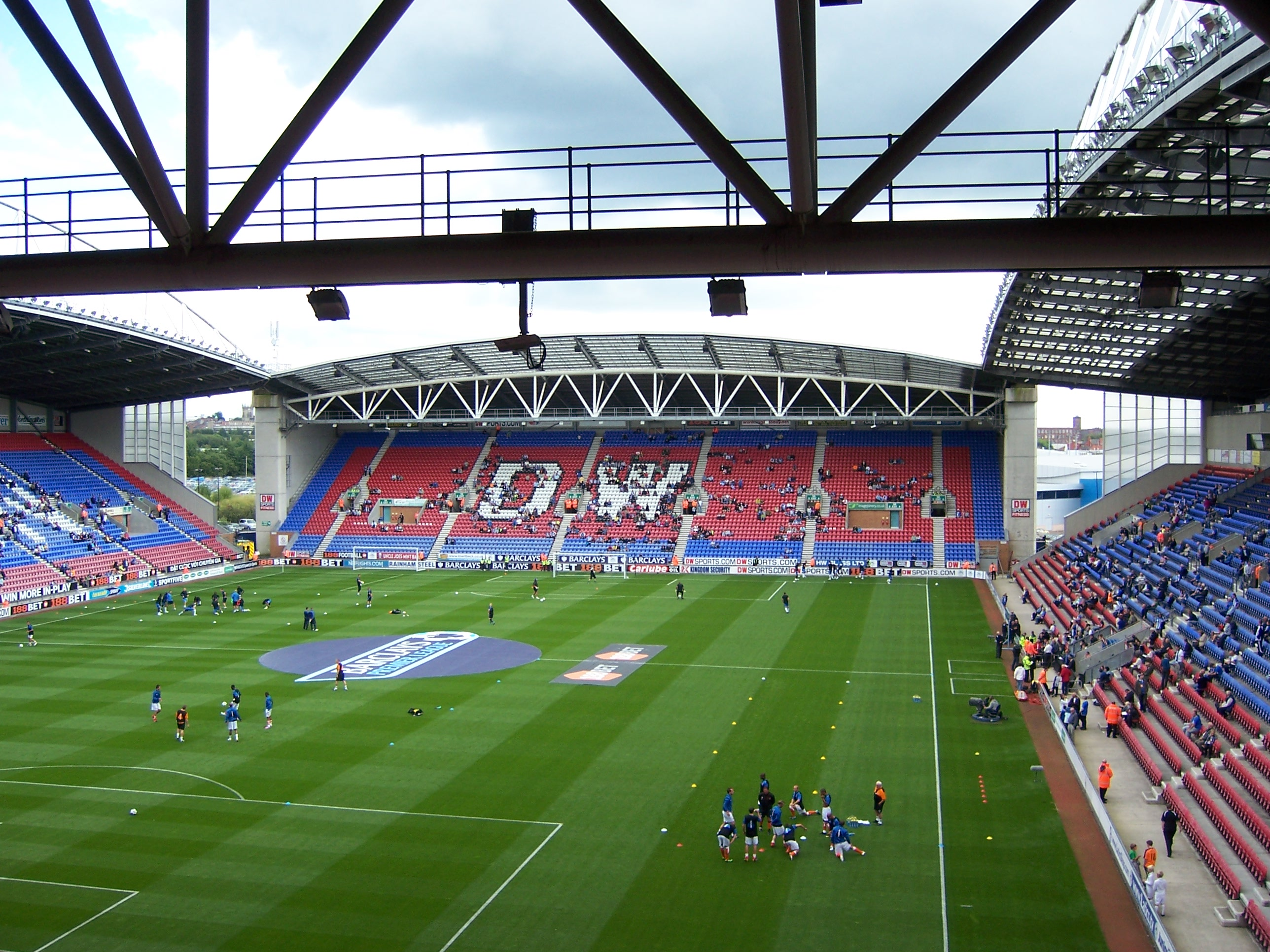
DW Stadium

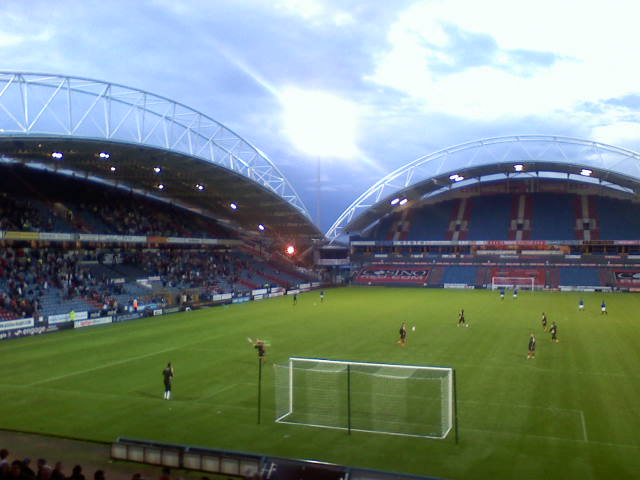
Kirklees Stadium

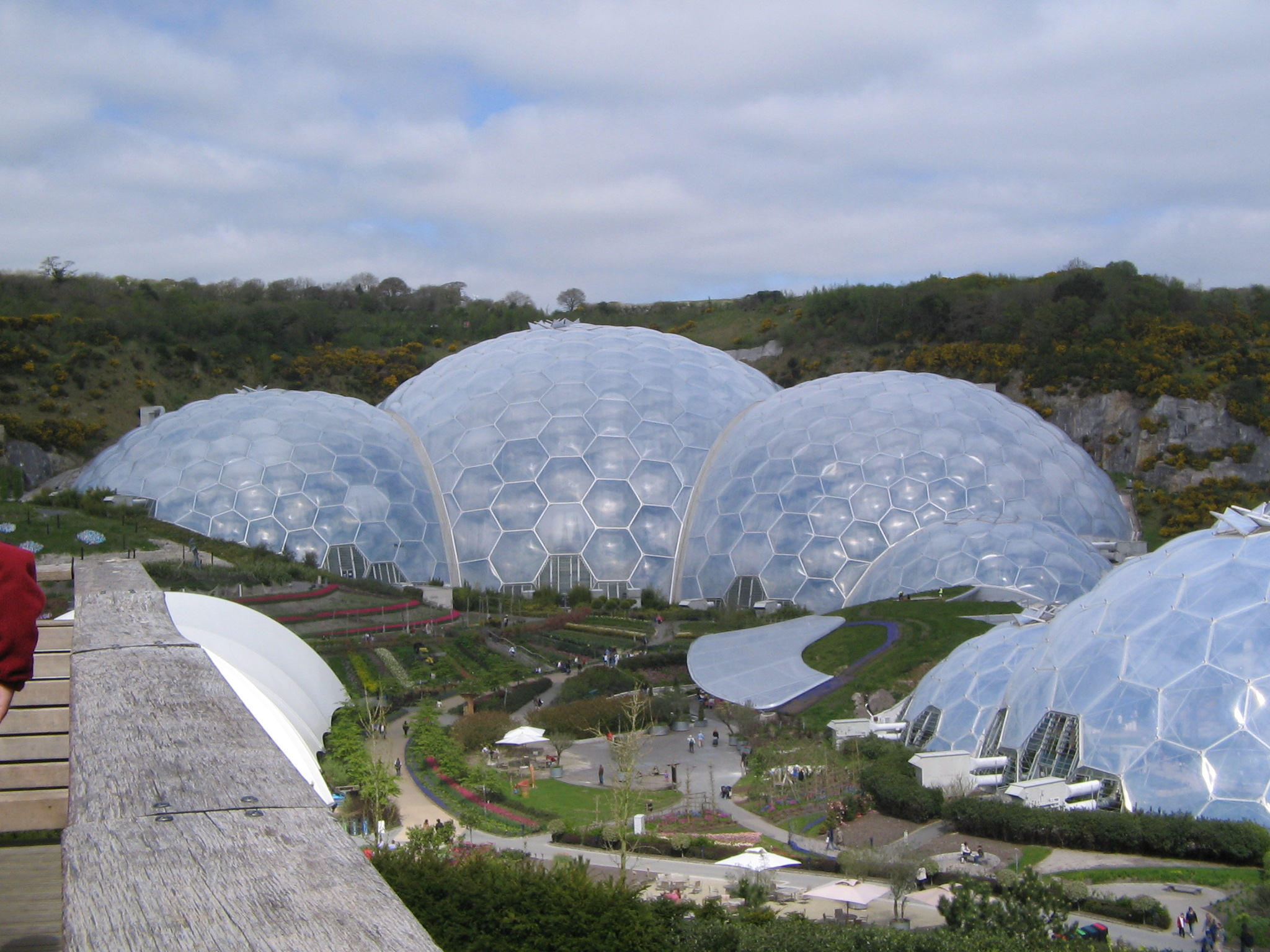
Eden Project
