= Alvito Dam =

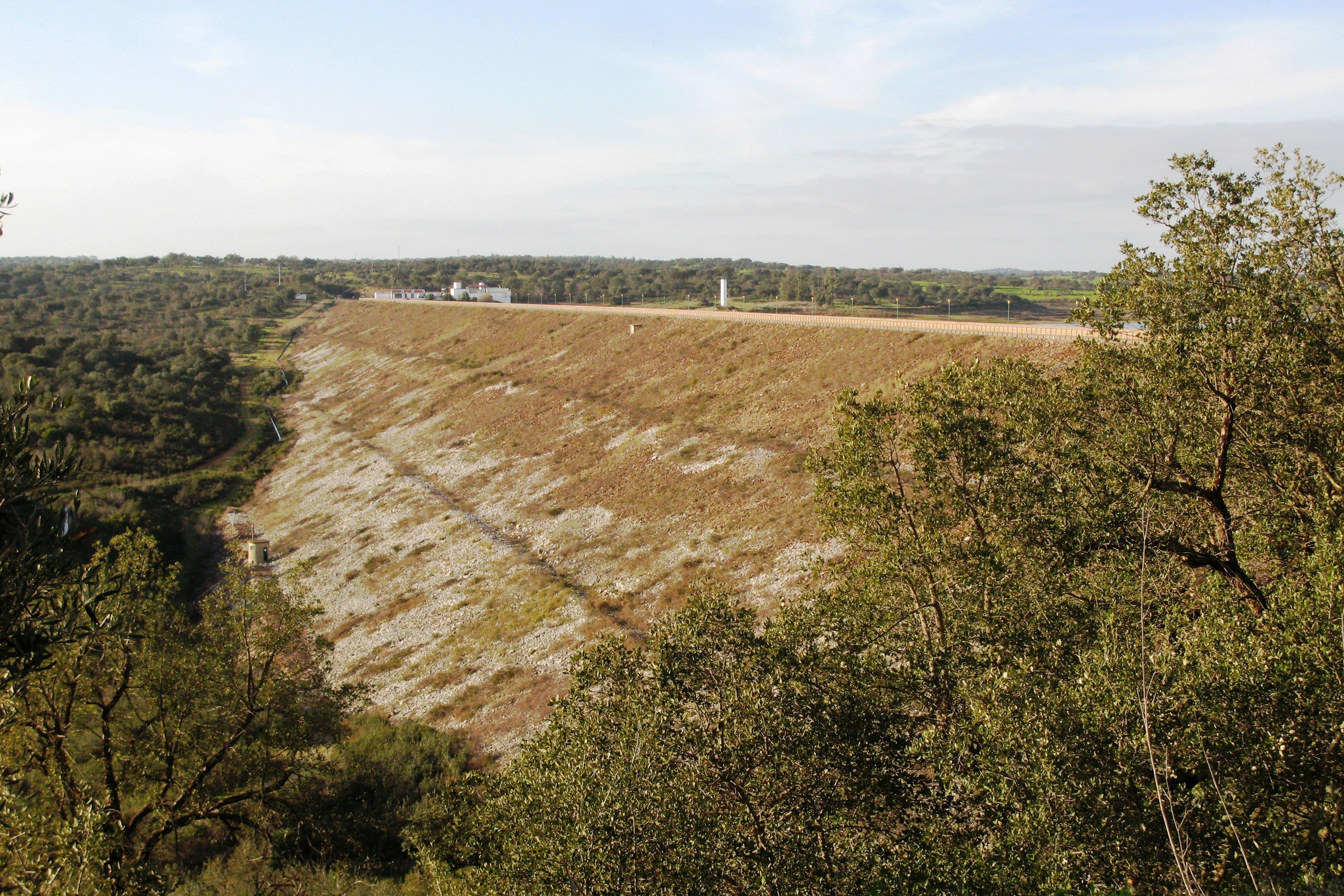
- Alvito Dam
- Location: near Alvito Municipality, Beja District, Portugal
- Coordinates: 38.282°N 7.916°W
- Construction began: 1973
- Opening date: 1976
- Owner(s): Associação de Municípios de Cuba, Vidigueira e Alvito

Dam and spillways
- Impounds: Odivelas River
- Height: 49 metres (161 ft)
- Length: 1,105 metres (3,625 ft)

Reservoir
- Active capacity: 2,285,000 m^{3} (1,852 acre⋅ft)

The Alvito Dam is a large earthfill dam in Portugal. The dam was built by Construções A. Supico between 1973 and 1976. It is in the Alvito Municipality within Beja District and impounds the Odivelas River.

== Sources ==
- Gray, Tony (1987). The Road to Success: Alfred McAlpine 1935 - 1985. Rainbird Publishing.
