= Edwin McAlpine, Baron McAlpine of Moffat =

British construction magnate (1907–1990)

Robert Edwin McAlpine, Baron McAlpine of Moffat (23 April 1907 – 7 January 1990), grandson of Sir Robert McAlpine, 1st Baronet, was a British construction magnate who headed Sir Robert McAlpine Ltd.

== Career ==
Edwin was the second son of William Hepburn McAlpine. He joined the family firm when he left Oundle School at the age of 18, becoming a partner in the 1950s. In 1955, he became deputy chairman of the Nuclear Power Plant Co., becoming the chairman four years later, overseeing the construction of seven nuclear power stations for Sir Robert McAlpine.

He was knighted in 1963 and was made a life peer as Baron McAlpine of Moffat, of Medmenham in the County of Buckinghamshire on 21 February 1980. He inherited the family baronetcy in 1983 on the death of his brother Tom.

He was an enthusiastic racehorse breeder and owned his own stud at Henley-on-Thames, was chairman of Sandown Park Racecourse and was a frequent gambler.

== Family ==
On 8 December 1930 McAlpine married Ella Mary Gardner Garnett (died 1987). They had four children: Patricia (born 1932), William (1936–2018), (Robert) Alistair (1942–2014), and David (born 1946). The sons also joined the family firm.

== Arms ==
Coat of arms of Edwin McAlpine, Baron McAlpine of Moffat

Crest
A cubit arm grasping a chaplet of pine fructed all Proper.
Escutcheon
Per chevron Vert and Or two chevronels one in chief Argent, the other in base Azure.
Supporters
Two horses reguardant Argent crined and unguled Or, each holding in its mouth a sprig of pine fructed Proper and on a compartment of moorland and heather Proper.
Motto
Buigo Sure

Baronetage of the United Kingdom
Preceded by Thomas McAlpine	Baronet (of Knott Park); 1983–1990	Succeeded by William McAlpine
