= Michael McAlpine =

Michael McAlpine is an associate professor of mechanical engineering at the University of Minnesota, where he researches 3D printing functional materials. He was formerly an assistant professor of aerospace engineering at Princeton University, where he conducted research on materials capable of generating power from human motion. He has a BS from Brown University, an MA and a Ph.D. from Harvard University, all in chemistry. In 2010 he was included in the MIT Technology Review's TR35 list.
