= Joseph W. McAlpin =

American politician

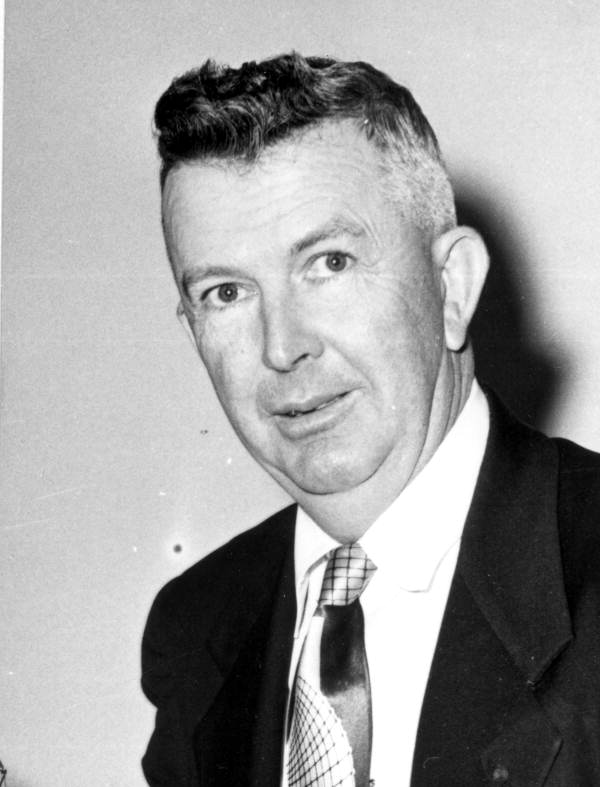
- McAlpin in 1961

Member of the Florida House of Representatives from Hamilton County
- In office 1945–1963

Personal details
- Born: October 17, 1900 White Springs, Florida, U.S.
- Died: October 9, 1970 (aged 69)
- Party: Democratic
- Children: 1
- Education: University of Florida

Joseph W. McAlpin (October 17, 1900 – October 9, 1970) was an American politician. He served as a Democratic member of the Florida House of Representatives.

== Life and career ==
McAlpin was born in White Springs, Florida. He attended the University of Florida.

McAlpin served in the Florida House of Representatives from 1945 to 1963.

McAlpin died on October 9, 1970, at the age of 69.
