= Chechen mafia =

Russian and Soviet organized crime group

- Founded by: Nikolay Suleimanov
- Founding location: North Caucasus; Chechen Republic of Ichkeria
- Years active: 1974–present
- Territory: Active mostly in Europe and many parts of Eastern Europe and the former Soviet Union (mostly Moscow).
- Ethnicity: Predominantly Chechens, and other caucasians.
- Leaders: Khozh-Ahmed Noukhayev (Khozha); Movladi Atlangeriyev (Ruslan); Mustafa Shidayev; Ali Aslan Ungharov
- Criminal activities: Money laundering, racketeering, extortion, arms trafficking, drug trafficking, cybercrime, human trafficking, arson, fraud, larceny, murder, stealing, terrorism.
- Rivals: Lebanese mafia Russian mafia Ukrainian mafia Serbian mafia

The Chechen mafia (Chechen: Нохчийн мафи, romanized: Noxçiyn mafi; Russian: Чеченская мафия, romanized: Chechenskaya mafiya) is one of the largest ethnic organized crime groups operating in the former Soviet Union next to established Russian mafia groups.

== Structure ==
While most Slavic and Caucasian gangsters in the Soviet era followed the thieves in law subculture, Chechens largely resisted this, instead preferring to use the tribal structure of the teip as well as the concept of an abrek, the outlaw-hero.

== In Moscow ==
The Moscow branch of the Chechen mafia, also known as the Obshina or "community", was founded by gangster Nikolay Suleimanov during the 1980s. Suleimanov operated a second-hand car business and made the bulk of his profits through tax evasion. The group later moved into extortion as capitalism penetrated the Soviet economy, and at this point Khozh-Ahmed Noukhayev, at the time a university student and part of an underground student movement dedicated to Chechen independence, was brought in as an enforcer. The more ideological Noukhayev imposed an additional condition on businesses under his "protection", which was that they must invite a Chechen into their workforce. Facilitating Chechen migration into Moscow would mean his organisation became a formidable force in the underworld. Boris Berezovsky was one of the businessmen associated with the Chechens during this period.

The Chechen reputation for violence was formidable, and before long they became the dominant crime group in Moscow. This brought them into conflict with the Slavic gangs, including the Solntsevskaya bratva and the Orekhovskaya gang, who were concerned at the growing links between organised crime and the Chechen separatist movement.

== Connections to Chechen separatism ==
Khozh-Ahmed Noukhayev claimed that he started racketeering as a student to help raise funds for the Chechen nationalist cause. Indeed, over the course of his activities, Noukhayev became acquainted with Dzhokhar Dudayev, who recognised his important role in Moscow's Chechen community and took him on as an unofficial aide, before helping him escape from prison in 1991. Noukhayev played a prominent role in the lead-up to the First Chechen War, participating in last-minute negotiations with the Russian government. He later fought in and was wounded in the Battle of Grozny. After the war, Noukhayev continued to play a key role in Chechen politics and set up a holding company, the Caucasian Common Market, which aimed to bring prosperity to Chechnya by building an oil pipeline between Europe and Azerbaijan. But the Second Chechen War ended this initiative.

In the chaos of war-torn Chechnya, many of the insurgent forces turned to criminality in order to raise funds. Kidnapping became a key business for both rebels and local bandits, including Arbi Barayev's Special Purpose Islamic Regiment. In one particularly notorious case, four British engineers were abducted and beheaded. Oil theft and smuggling also became a major source of income. During its brief period of independence, Chechnya quickly fell into anarchy, becoming a major hub for arms trafficking (with a gun market in central Grozny), mobsters using local banks to launder profits from criminal activities, and rival warlords, armed gangs, and Islamist terrorists all fighting each other for control. It was this atmosphere of lawlessness that exacerbated tensions with Russia and helped provide justification for the Second Chechen War.

== Connections to the Chechen government ==
Under the rule of Ramzan Kadyrov, the criminalisation of Chechnya has taken a somewhat different turn to the wartime chaos that preceded it. Government officials have been accused of embezzling billions in state funds from Moscow, turning Chechnya into something of a financial "black hole", as well as demanding kickbacks for construction projects. The Kadyrovtsy are also believed to be responsible for a number of murders and attempted murders, some of them political as in the case of the Yamadayev brothers, and some business-related, such as the attempted hit on banker German Gorbuntsov in London in 2012.

== In popular culture ==
- In Eastern Promises (2007), Chechen gangsters seek revenge for the killing of their associate in London.
- In the 2008 film The Dark Knight, one of the Gotham City organized crime factions is represented by a figure known as "The Chechen", portrayed by Ritchie Coster. The Chechen has at his command a pair of vicious dogs. The Chechen is later apparently killed on the orders of the Joker (Heath Ledger), who orders him to be cut up and fed to his own dogs. The dogs are later used by the Joker to attack Batman (Christian Bale).
- A side-plot of the Russian crime film Brother revolves around a struggle between Chechen and Russian mafia over the control of a market.
- Several episodes of Brigada deal with the titular gang's dealings with Chechen militants and organised crime figures.
- The Chechen mafia make an appearance in the Frederick Forsyth novel Icon.
- Chechen criminal figures make an appearance at the end of The Other Guys.
- In the Turkish TV series Valley of the Wolves, Chechen mafia members are seen in the Valley.
- In the 2014 film The Drop, the Chechen mafia uses a series of Brooklyn bars to collect illegal money. In this case, the Chechen mafia are represented as the main antagonists of the film and are represented by Chovka Umarov (Michael Aronov).
- In the HBO series Barry, the Chechen mafia in Los Angeles is led by Goran Pazar (Glenn Fleshler) and Goran's right-hand man, NoHo Hank (Anthony Carrigan) is one of the main protagonists.

== See also ==
- North Caucasus
