= McAlpine Mountain =

Mountain in North Carolina, United States

Coordinates: 35°14′34″N 82°26′9″W

McAlpine Mountain is a summit in Henderson County, North Carolina, in the United States. With an elevation of 2,923 feet (891 m), McAlpine Mountain is the 1673th highest summit in the state of North Carolina.

The peak was named for Henry McAlpin, an early settler.
