= Clan MacAlpine =

Scottish Family

House of McAlpine
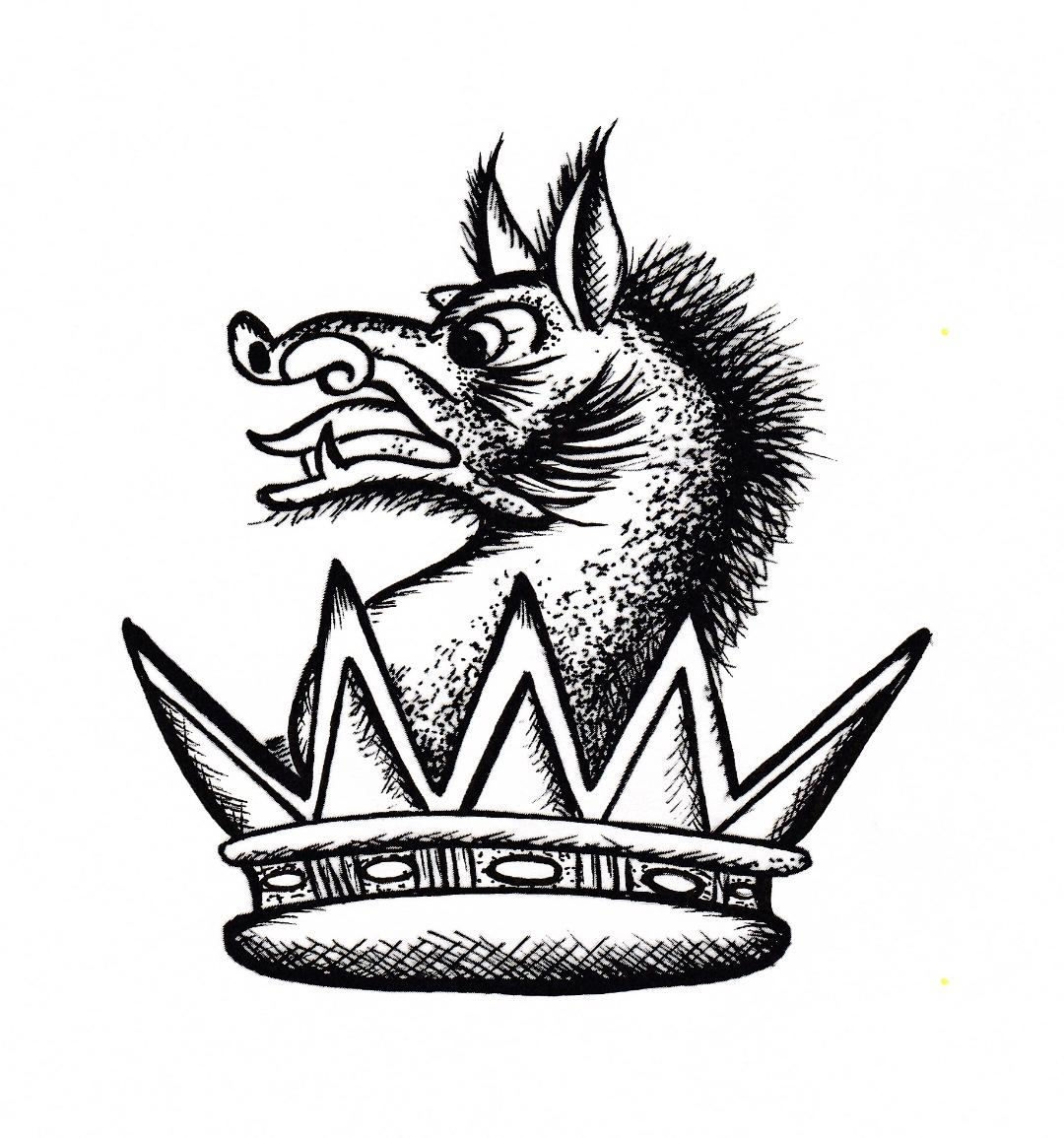
- War cry: "Cuimhnich Bàs Ailpein!" [Remember the death of Alpin!]
- House of McAlpine no longer has a chief, and is an armigerous clan
- Commander: Michael T. McAlpin

Family MacAlpine is Scottish Family without a Hereditary Chief recognized by the Lord Lyon King of Arms. However, following a Petition to the Lord Lyon King of Arms, a Family Convention was held at Abbotsford House the home of Sir Walter Scott on 10 September 2016. The Family Conclave selected and recommended Michael Todd McAlpin Senior for the role of Commander. On 19 April 2017 Michael received his Commission as Commander of MacAlpine from Dr. Joseph Morrow the Lord Lyon. This Commission has empowered him to do and perform all acts and functions proper for a period of ten years or until a Chief is named.

== History ==
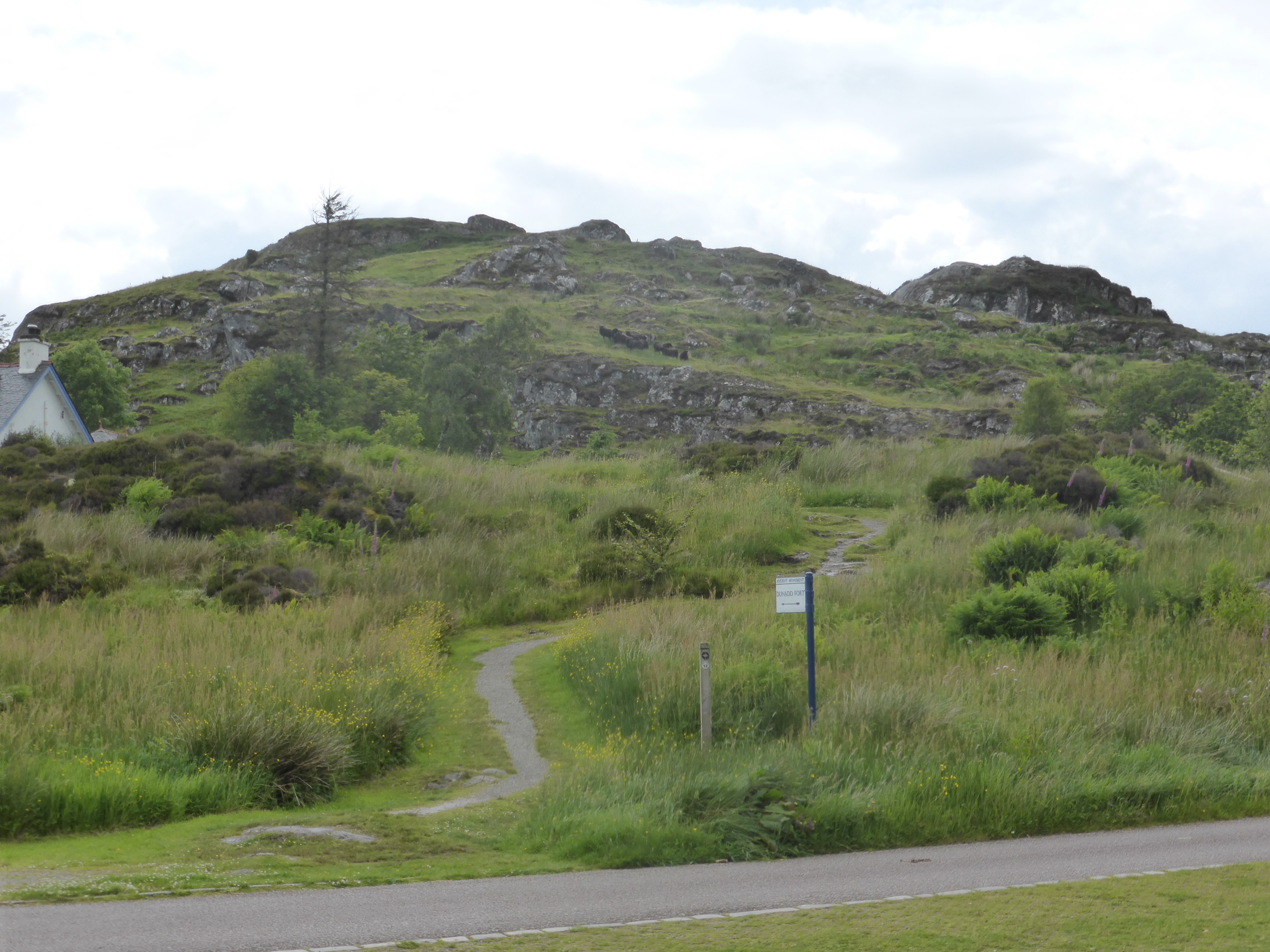
Dunadd, site of the hill-fort said to have been held by Kenneth MacAlpine

According to tradition the MacAlpine, or MacAlpin, is most purely Celtic of all the Highland Scottish clans. The MacAlpine surname is still common in Scotland today.

The former chiefs apparently had their seat on lands that are now Dunstaffnage Castle in Argyll, which was an early capital of Kenneth MacAlpin, who was King of the Picts and according to myth, the first King of Scots.

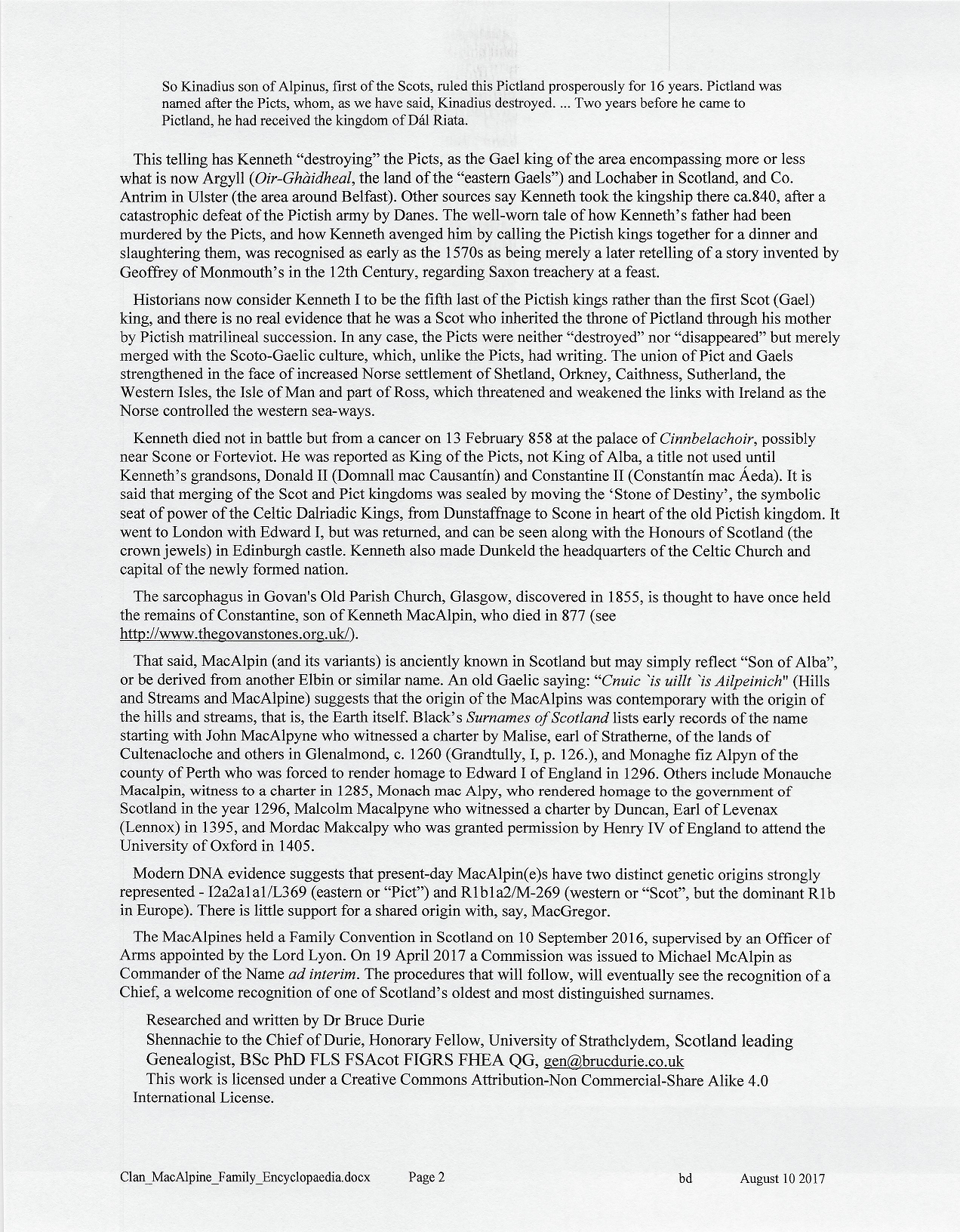
MacAlpine Encyclopaedia p1
