= Alfred McAlpine (businessman) =

British construction company founder

Sir Alfred David McAlpine OStJ (6 November 1881 – 25 May 1944) was the founder of the construction company Sir Alfred McAlpine & Son.

== Career ==
Born a younger son of Robert McAlpine, after completing his education at Kelvinside Academy he served an apprenticeship across his father's construction and civil engineering business.

McAlpine was appointed in 1935 to run McAlpine (Midlands) Ltd, which covered the Midlands and Northwest of England. Following the deaths of Sir Robert and his eldest son in 1937, Alfred ran the company independently. In 1940, it was agreed to formally separate the entities, and so the company name and the Midlands operations were handed back to the former company, while Alfred formed the new Sir Alfred McAlpine & Son. Under a non-competing agreement with its former parent company, Sir Alfred McAlpine confined itself to civil engineering and to the north west of England.

McAlpine was appointed High Sheriff of Denbighshire for 1923–24. He also served as Chairman of the Wrexham Conservative Association and as Honorary Treasurer of the North Wales Division of the National Union of Conservative and Unionist Associations.

== Awards ==
McAlpine became a Knight bachelor in the 1932 New Year Honours list. He was appointed an Officer of the Venerable Order of Saint John on 20 December 1937.

== Personal life ==
In 1907 he married Ethel May Williams, a daughter of James Williams, of Dessmuir House, Aboyne, Aberdeenshire, a distiller and landowner, and they had one son (James) and two daughters. In 1924, McAlpine was one of the executors of his father-in-law's will, which left an estate valued at £64,524, (equivalent to £3,391,615 in 2025).

In 1913, he bought Marchwiel Hall in the village of Marchwiel, Denbighshire, in North Wales. Home to the Marchwiel and Wrexham Cricket Club, McAlpine developed it as "one of the most picturesque settings for playing the game in the country". Already chairman of the county cricket association, he played cricket for Denbighshire in the 1926–27 season.

== Sources ==
- Gray, Tony (1987). The Road to Success: Alfred McAlpine 1935 – 1985. Rainbird Publishing.
- Russell, Doris McAlpin (1990). McAlpin(e) genealogies, 1730–1990: Alexander McAlpin of South Carolina and Georgia and his descendants, plus other McAlpin(e) families of North America. Gateway Press. p. 688.
