= Sir Robert McAlpine, 1st Baronet =

Scottish businessman (1847–1934)

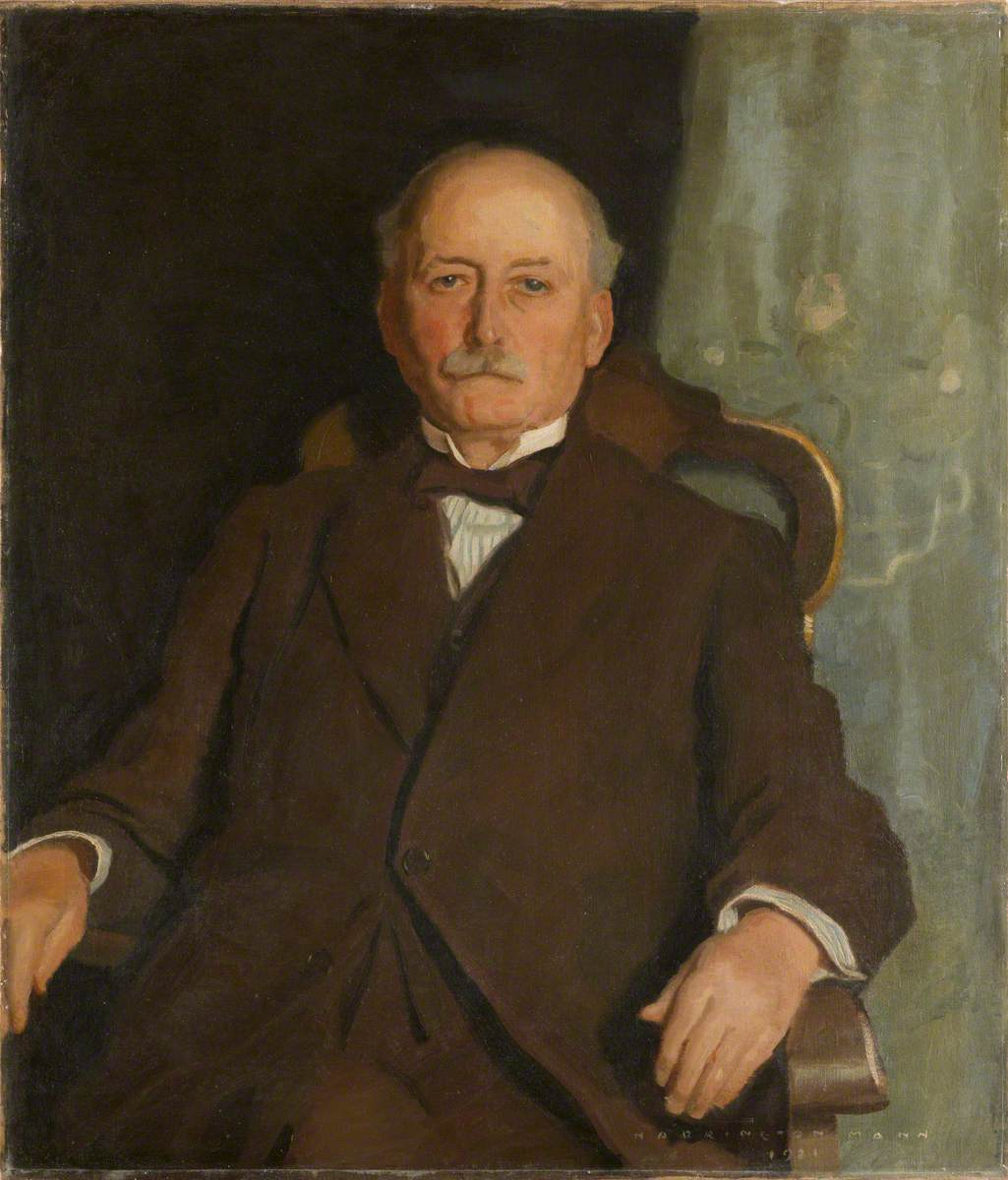
- Born: Robert McAlpine; 13 February 1847; Newarthill, Lanarkshire, Scotland
- Died: 3 November 1934 (aged 87)
- Occupation: Businessman
- Spouses: Agnes Hepburn (m. 1868; died 1888); Florence Palmer (m. 1889)
- Children: 10, including Alfred and Douglas
- Relatives: Kenneth McAlpine (grandson)

Sir Robert McAlpine, 1st Baronet (13 February 1847 – 3 November 1934) was a Scottish businessman who founded the British construction firm which is now known as Sir Robert McAlpine. He was made a baronet in June 1918, the first of the McAlpine baronets.

== Career ==
He left school at the age of 10 to work in a coal mine, but became an apprentice bricklayer. He was involved in the building of roads, public buildings and other works, some of the tunnelling for the Glasgow Subway and the Singer Sewing Machine factory in Clydebank, Dunbartonshire. Overseas, in 1918 McAlpine was contracted to expand the harbour in Heraklion, Crete. The power station built for the purpose was later used to provide the town's electricity.

== Construction company ==
McAlpine built up the large building and civil engineering firm that bears his name. He was also a pioneer in the use of concrete and labour-saving machinery. McAlpine oversaw the construction of Glenfinnan Viaduct.

== Family ==
Robert McAlpine was married twice. On 12 June 1868, he married Agnes Hepburn (d. 1888). They had five sons: Robert (1868–1934), William Hepburn (1871–1950), Thomas Malcolm (1877–1967), Alfred David (1881–1944) and Granville (1882–1928) and two daughters, Agnes and Ethel. His daughter Agnes became the second wife of Louis Marie Charles Fradin de Belabre in 1905. De Belabre had a son and two daughters from his first marriage to Janetta Alexandra West, a grand daughter of Admiral Sir John West, but she had died in 1903. Agnes de Belabre and Louis had one daughter, Yolande born in 1908, but divorced in 1915.

On 21 August 1889, McAlpine married Florence Margaret Palmer and had one son: Archibald Douglas McAlpine (1890–1981) and two daughters, Emma and Roberta. Roberta married Richard Lloyd George and was the mother of Owen Lloyd George, 3rd Earl Lloyd-George of Dwyfor.

McAlpine died while at sea onboard MV Warwick Castle of a cerebral haemorrhage. He was 87 years old.

Baronetage of the United Kingdom
New creation	Baronet (of Knott Park); 1918–1934	Succeeded by Robert McAlpine
