= Sir Robert McAlpine =

British construction and engineering company

Sir Robert McAlpine Ltd
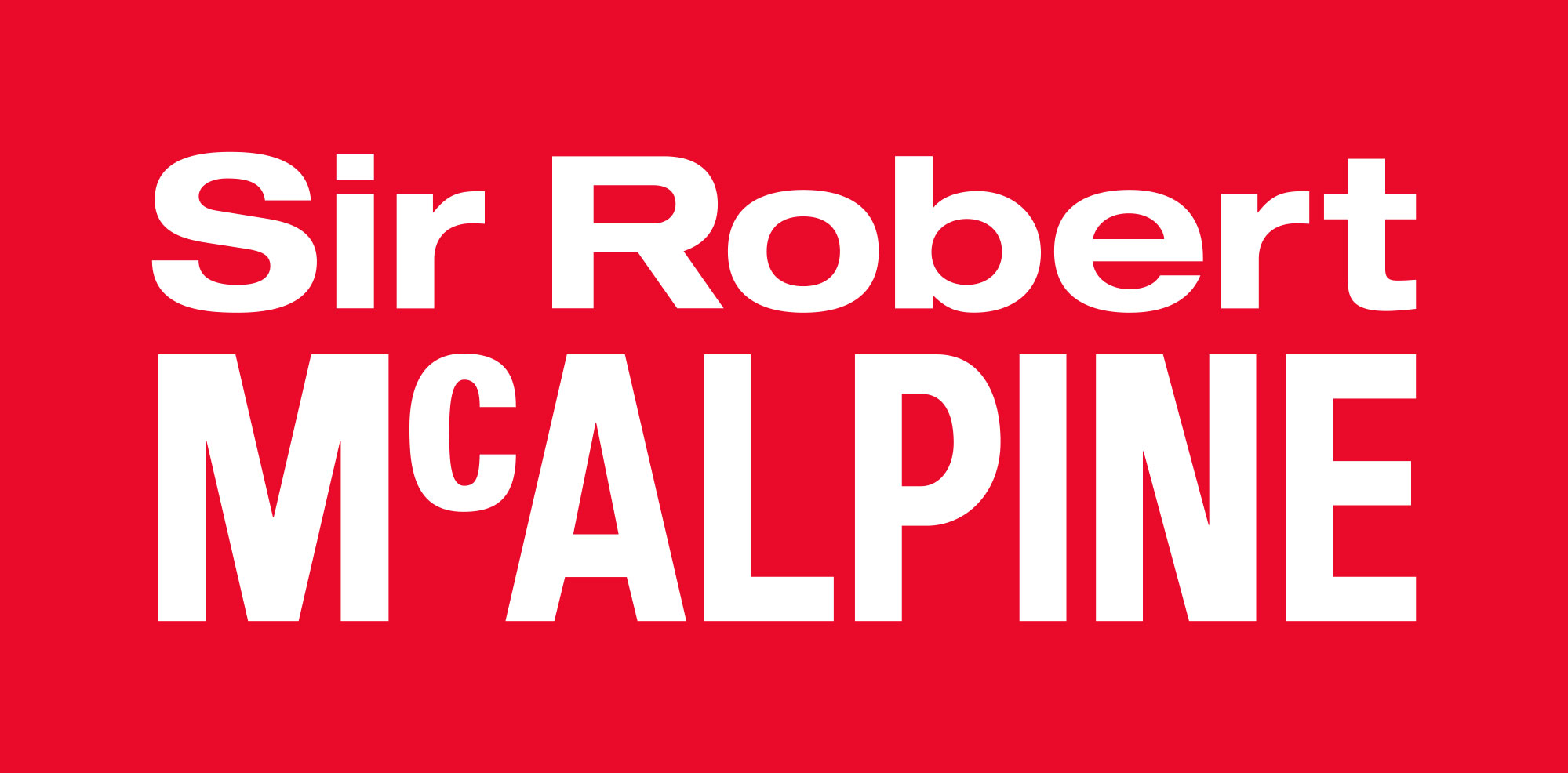
- Type: Private
- Industry: Engineering / Construction
- Founded: 1869
- Headquarters: Kings Langley, Hertfordshire, England
- Key people: Edward McAlpine (chairman); Neil Martin (chief executive)
- Revenue: ▲£940 million (2024)
- Operating income: ▲£10.4 million (2024)
- Website: www.srm.com

Sir Robert McAlpine Limited is a British building and civil engineering company based in Kings Langley, England. It carries out engineering and construction in the infrastructure, heritage, commercial, arena and stadium, healthcare, education and nuclear sectors.

== History ==
Robert McAlpine was born in 1847 in the Scottish village of Newarthill near Motherwell. From the age of seven he worked in the nearby coal mines, leaving at 16 to become an apprentice bricklayer. Later, working for an engineer, he progressed to being foreman before starting to work on his own account at the age of 22. He had no capital other than what he could earn himself, and his first contract involving the employment of other men had to be financed by borrowing £11 (equivalent to £1,132 in 2025) from the butcher. From there, McAlpine enjoyed rapid success; his early contracts centred on his own trade of bricklaying, and by 1874 he was the owner of two brickyards and the employer of 1,000 men. It was on one of the housing estates he built that he first experimented with using concrete blocks as well as bricks (from which he earned the nickname 'Concrete Bob').

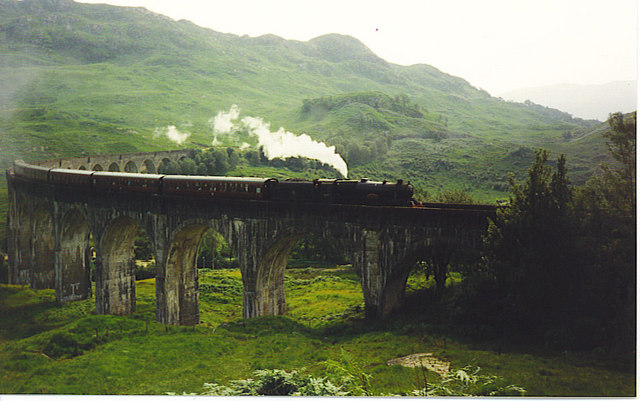
The Glenfinnan Viaduct

With the capital he had acquired, McAlpine determined to build a garden city at Hamilton, South Lanarkshire. Relying now on the income from his estate, McAlpine’s attention moved away from his contracting business towards self-education. However, the financial panic following the collapse of the City of Glasgow Bank in 1878 virtually wiped out McAlpine financially: his mortgages were called in but his debtors did not pay him.

The liabilities from the Hamilton estate were threatening the construction business and to protect it, Robert took his clerk into partnership, trading under the name McAlpine & Co; the clerk was bought out not long after. McAlpine’s first large contract was a building for the Singer Manufacturing Company in 1883 and the profit from that enabled him to pay off his remaining debts. Almost immediately he faced further financial difficulties. Winning a contract for the Lanarkshire and Ayrshire Railway without the necessary technical knowledge, the subsequent rebuilding work and litigation meant another fresh start.

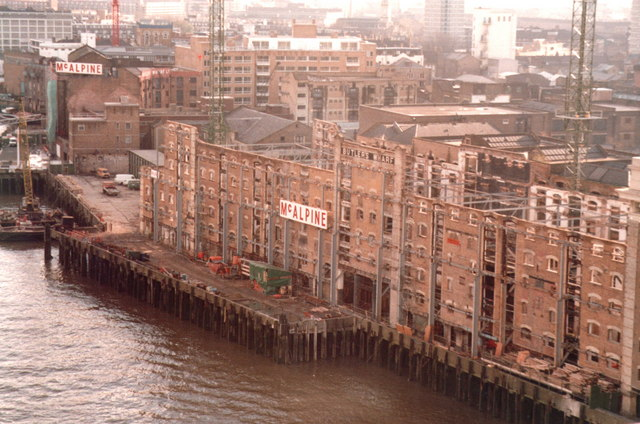
Butler's Wharf redevelopment, Bermondsey (1987)

In 1887, McAlpine took his two eldest sons, Robert and William, out of school to help him, with Malcolm and Alfred following soon after, and they did much to rationalise the firm’s administration and finances. Undaunted by his earlier experience, McAlpine took on further railway contracts, this time successfully, including the Mallaig Extension Railway and the Glasgow Subway. There was an increasingly wide range of building and civil engineering contracts, but the firm was almost brought to its knees again with the construction of the Methil Docks between 1909 and 1913. It was argued that this led to a much more cautious approach to risk on the part of the sons, if not the father.

The inter-war period saw the firm focusing solely on construction. Gray wrote that Sir Robert McAlpine (who had been made a baronet in 1918) “seemed to have been involved in every major building and civil engineering project that ever hit the headlines of the day.” They included docks, harbours, power stations, factories; the Wembley Stadium and the Dorchester Hotel were notable examples. In the case of the Dorchester, when the client was unable to pay for the construction works, the company took possession of the completed building and operated it on its own account.

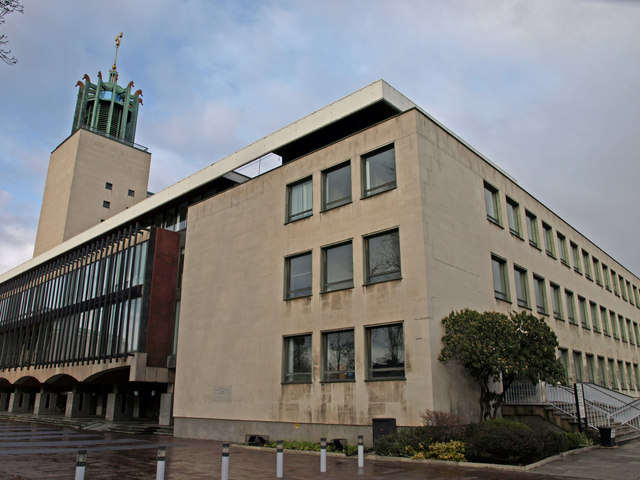
Newcastle Civic Centre

In November 1934, McAlpine died, aged 87. Two weeks later, his eldest son, the new Sir Robert, also died. William was appointed Chairman, while Alfred remained in charge of the operations in the north-west subsidiary, where he had been since 1918. The two London partners argued that the recession was impacting more on the north than the south and proposed closing Alfred’s company. Alfred, however, did not wish to return to London and, on an informal basis at first, the two businesses were run separately. The separation was formalised in 1940, and the northern business was renamed Sir Alfred McAlpine. During the Second World War, the Sir Robert McAlpine company was one of the contractors engaged in building the Mulberry harbour units.

The two McAlpine firms had non-competing arrangements, and sites had a common “McAlpine” board, irrespective of which firm was doing the work. When both companies first went public, they did so under the names Newarthill for Robert and Marchwiel for Alfred. These arrangements continued until 1983. In 2003, Sir Robert McAlpine Ltd sued Alfred McAlpine plc over the use of the family name and won. The dispute centred on Alfred McAlpine's intention to trade under the name "McAlpine". There was previously a long-standing agreement within the McAlpine family not to make such a change but, following the death of Alfred McAlpine and his son, the board of Alfred McAlpine sought to make the change in any event. The effect of the judgment was to prevent Alfred McAlpine trading under the name "McAlpine". In 2008, Alfred McAlpine plc was acquired by Carillion and dismantled, thus making the "name war" irrelevant.

In November 2017, the company announced 90 job losses in a cost-cutting drive following a loss-making energy from waste project. Six regional centres were to be cut to four. The company then announced a new board and leadership structure, with no McAlpine family members included in the leadership team under CEO Paul Hamer. Edward McAlpine took over from Gavin McAlpine as chairman in January 2019.

In the year to October 2022, the company had a turnover of £1.1bn with pre-tax profit of £9.3m. In 2023, Hamer reviewed the firm's structure and switched its focus to sectors rather than regions; the restructure was estimated to cost £8.4m and would result in annual savings of over £20m. However, Hamer did not see these savings realised – by February 2024, he was on gardening leave with former Lendlease boss Neil Martin taking over as CEO on 19 February 2024.

In July 2024, Sir Robert McAlpine reported a £110m operating loss in the year to October 2023, with revenue down 19% to £881m. It recovered the following year, reporting a £10.4m pre-tax profit on turnover up 7% to £940m.

=== The Irish connection ===
From the 1930s onwards, the company employed large numbers of Irish immigrants who had come to England looking for work. The harsh working conditions with which McAlpine's management treated their labourers has gone down in Irish emigrant folklore. The song "McAlpine's Fusiliers" (written by Dominic Behan and made famous by The Dubliners) described the realities of life on the building site for many Irish expatriates. The company is also mentioned in other songs, such as "Building Up and Tearing England Down," also written by Behan, though historian Ultan Cowley has suggested that the relationship between Irish labour and senior management at Sir Robert McAlpine was more collaborative than what is related in these songs.

== Structure ==
Until 2023, the company was organised on a regional basis; following restructuring in late 2017, four regional centres were created: Scotland-Northern, Central-Wales-West, Southern and London. In 2020, the Wales business was merged into an expanded South region. In 2023, the company was restructured to focus on sectors rather than regions. Target markets included healthcare, commercial offices, industrial, heritage and complex schemes delivered by its Major & Special Projects team, and rail, transport and nuclear sectors delivered by its infrastructure business.

== Major projects ==
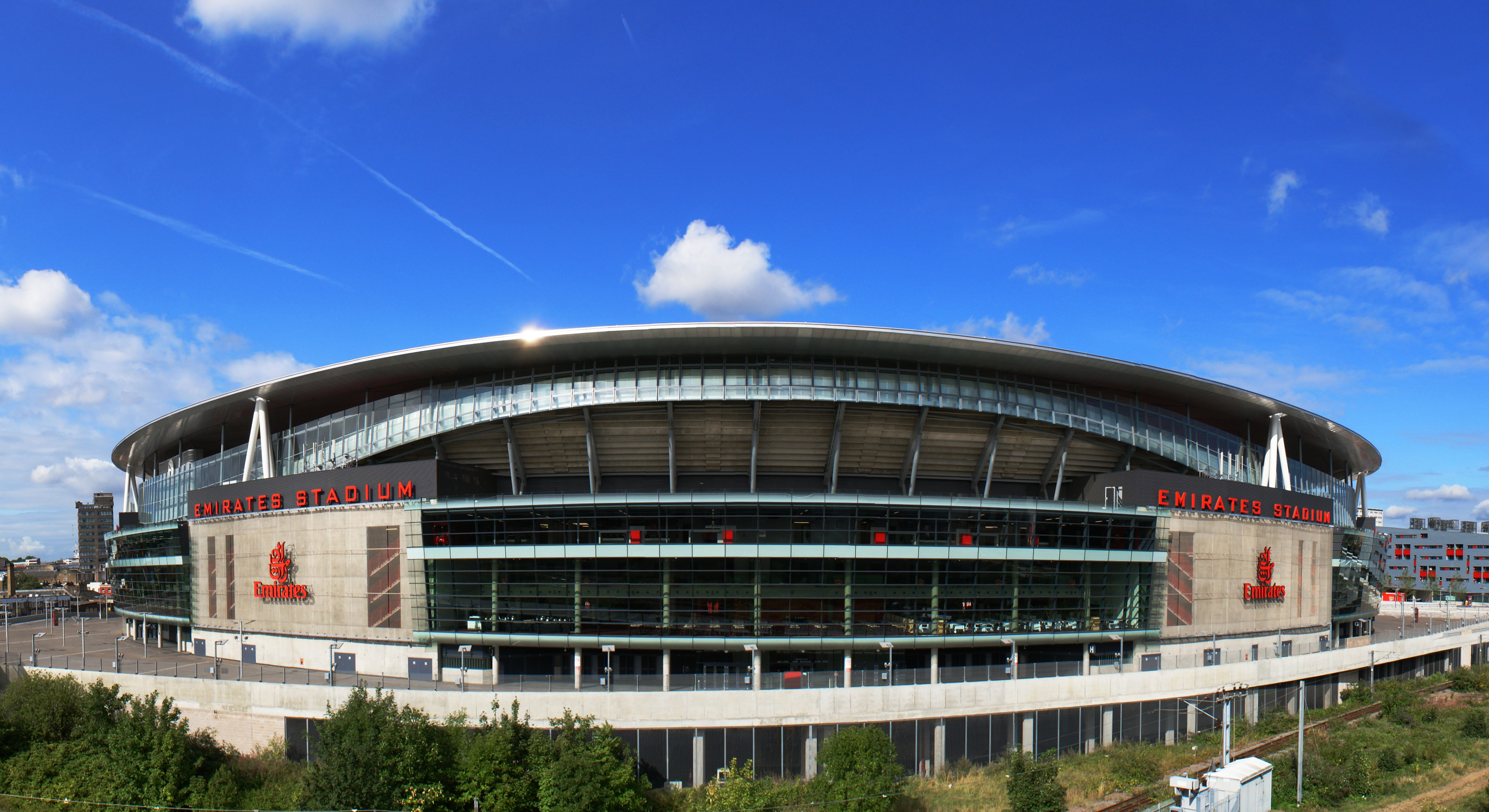
Emirates Stadium

Projects undertaken by the company have included:

- Glenfinnan Viaduct completed in 1901
- Lanarkshire and Ayrshire Railway completed in 1904
- Maine Road Stadium completed in 1923
- Wembley Stadium completed in 1924
- The port of Heraklion in Greece completed in 1930
- Dorchester Hotel in London completed in 1931
- Odeon Leicester Square completed in 1937
- The Shell Centre completed in 1962
- Newcastle Civic Centre completed in 1968
- Hyde Park Barracks, London completed in 1970
- Royal National Theatre completed in 1977
- Nissan Motor Manufacturing Plant completed in 1985
- St. Enoch Centre completed in 1989
- Refurbishment of the Clove Building at Butler's Wharf completed in 1990
- One Canada Square completed in 1991, which stood as the tallest building in London until surpassed in 2012 by The Shard.
- Millennium Dome completed in 1999, which the company also redeveloped as The O2
- Millennium Bridge completed in 2000
- ExCeL Exhibition Centre completed in 2000
- Eden Project completed in 2001
- Wishaw General Hospital completed in 2001
- Imperial War Museum North completed in 2002
- Bull Ring, Birmingham completed in 2003
- Exeter Law Courts completed in 2004
- Expansion of the Russells Hall Hospital in Dudley completed in 2006
- Emirates Stadium completed in 2006
- Redevelopment of Colchester Garrison completed in 2008
- White River Place development in St Austell town centre completed in 2009
- Olympic Stadium for London 2012 completed in 2011
- Hereford's Old Market shopping centre was completed in 2014
- One Kensington Gardens completed in 2015
- City of Glasgow College completed in 2016

Sir Robert McAlpine is also involved in HS2 lot C1, working as part of joint venture, due to complete in 2031.

== Blacklisting controversy ==
Sir Robert McAlpine funded the initial establishment of the Consulting Association in 1993, providing £20,000, around half of which was used to buy a blacklist database from the Economic League and hire one of its former employees, Ian Kerr, as manager. Company director Cullum McAlpine served as chairman of the Consulting Association for some years before it became publicly implicated in a construction industry blacklisting scandal in 2009 and was wound up. Subsequently, Sir Robert McAlpine was one of eight businesses involved in the 2014 launch of the Construction Workers Compensation Scheme, though this was condemned as a "PR stunt" by the GMB union, and described by the Scottish Affairs Select Committee as "an act of bad faith".

On 11 May 2016, major companies, including Sir Robert McAlpine, issued an "unreserved and sincere" apology in the high court to hundreds of workers for putting them on the illegal blacklist and denying them work over two decades. The companies agreed to pay sums ranging from £25,000 to £200,000 to 771 people under out-of-court settlements to avoid a trial, while accepting that "their secret vetting operation should never have happened". However, evidence disclosed before the settlement led many of the victims to claim that there was an illegal attempt by McAlpine executives to destroy evidence and cover up the involvement of key individuals when the blacklisting was discovered in 2009. The targets of the victims' intended criminal complaint included director Cullum McAlpine, and head of human resources, David Cochrane, who was a later chairman of the Association. Both denied involvement in destroying any relevant files and attempting to pervert the course of justice.

In September 2017, McAlpine chief executive Paul Hamer tried to disassociate the company from continuing allegations of blacklisting in the construction industry, saying "Sir Robert McAlpine complies fully with all legislation to prevent blacklisting and is committed to fair and transparent recruitment. ... We have a zero tolerance policy towards blacklisting, illegal or unfair recruitment practices." The company defended itself again in December 2017 when Unite announced it had issued High Court proceedings against four former chairmen of the Consulting Association, including Cullum McAlpine and David Cochrane, and against 12 major contractors including Sir Robert McAlpine. In May 2019, the Unite union secured a further £1.9m in compensation for 53 blacklisted workers. Seven construction businesses, including Sir Robert McAlpine, also agreed to pay £230,000 for a Unite training fund to help those affected by the vetting system, and paid Unite's legal fees. However, Unite assistant general secretary Howard Beckett said "the refusal of Cullum McAlpine to give evidence is bitterly disappointing."

== Sources ==
- Hartcup, Guy (2011). Code Name Mulberry: The Planning Building and Operation of the Normandy Harbours. Pen & Sword Military. ISBN 978-1848845589.
