= List of acts of the Parliament of the United Kingdom from 1812 =

This is a complete list of acts of the Parliament of the United Kingdom for the year 1812.

Note that the first parliament of the United Kingdom was held in 1801; parliaments between 1707 and 1800 were either parliaments of Great Britain or of Ireland). For acts passed up until 1707, see the list of acts of the Parliament of England and the list of acts of the Parliament of Scotland. For acts passed from 1707 to 1800, see the list of acts of the Parliament of Great Britain. See also the list of acts of the Parliament of Ireland.

For acts of the devolved parliaments and assemblies in the United Kingdom, see the list of acts of the Scottish Parliament, the list of acts of the Northern Ireland Assembly, and the list of acts and measures of Senedd Cymru; see also the list of acts of the Parliament of Northern Ireland.

The number shown after each act's title is its chapter number. Acts passed before 1963 are cited using this number, preceded by the year(s) of the reign during which the relevant parliamentary session was held; thus the Union with Ireland Act 1800 is cited as "39 & 40 Geo. 3 c. 67", meaning the 67th act passed during the session that started in the 39th year of the reign of George III and which finished in the 40th year of that reign. Note that the modern convention is to use Arabic numerals in citations (thus "41 Geo. 3" rather than "41 Geo. III"). Acts of the last session of the Parliament of Great Britain and the first session of the Parliament of the United Kingdom are both cited as "41 Geo. 3". Acts passed from 1963 onwards are simply cited by calendar year and chapter number.

All modern acts have a short title, e.g. "the Local Government Act 2003". Some earlier acts also have a short title given to them by later acts, such as by the Short Titles Act 1896.

== 52 Geo. 3 ==
The sixth session of the 4th Parliament of the United Kingdom, which met from 7 January 1812 until 30 July 1812.

This session was also traditionally cited as 52 G. 3.

=== Public general acts ===
Short title	Citation	Royal assent
Long title
Duties on Malt, etc. Act 1812 (repealed)	52 Geo. 3. c. 1	4 February 1812
An Act for continuing to His Majesty certain Duties on Malt, Sugar, Tobacco and Snuff in Great Britain; and on Pensions Offices and Personal Estates in England, for the Service of the Year One thousand eight hundred and twelve. (Repealed by Statute Law Revision Act 1873 (36 & 37 Vict. c. 91))
Customs Act 1812 (repealed)	52 Geo. 3. c. 2	4 February 1812
An Act to permit Sugar, the Produce of Martinique and other conquered lands in the West Indies, to be taken out of Warehouse on the Payment of the like Rate of Duty for Waste as British Plantation Sugar. (Repealed by Customs Law Repeal Act 1825 (6 Geo. 4. c. 105))
Distillation of Spirits Act 1812 (repealed)	52 Geo. 3. c. 3	7 February 1812
An Act to revive and continue until the Thirty first Day of December One thousand eight hundred and twelve, so much of an Act made in the Forty ninth Year of His present Majesty, (Note: Distillation of Spirits Act 1809 (49 Geo. 3. c. 7)) to prohibit the Distillation of Spirits from Corn or Grain, in the United Kingdom, as relates to Great Britain; and to revive and continue another Act made in the Forty ninth Year aforesaid, to suspend the Importation of British or Irish-made Spirits into Great Britain or Ireland respectively; and for granting certain Duties on Worts or Wash made from Sugar during the Prohibition of Distillation from Corn or Grain in Great Britain. (Repealed by Statute Law Revision Act 1873 (36 & 37 Vict. c. 91))
Exchequer Bills Act 1812 (repealed)	52 Geo. 3. c. 4	7 February 1812
An Act for raising the Sum of Ten millions five hundred thousand Pounds, by Exchequer Bills, for the Service of Great Britain for the Year One thousand eight hundred and twelve. (Repealed by Statute Law Revision Act 1873 (36 & 37 Vict. c. 91))
Exchequer Bills (No. 2) Act 1812 (repealed)	52 Geo. 3. c. 5	7 February 1812
An Act for raising the Sum of One million five hundred thousand Pounds, by Exchequer Bills, for the Service of Great Britain for the Year One thousand eight hundred and twelve. (Repealed by Statute Law Revision Act 1873 (36 & 37 Vict. c. 91))
Civil List during King's Illness Act 1812 (repealed)	52 Geo. 3. c. 6	11 February 1812
An Act for making Provision for the better Support of Majesty's Household during the Continuance of His Majesty's Indisposition. (Repealed by Statute Law Revision Act 1873 (36 & 37 Vict. c. 91))
Expenses of Prince Regent Act 1812 (repealed)	52 Geo. 3. c. 7	11 February 1812
An Act for granting to His Majesty a certain Sum for defraying the Expences incident to the Assumption of the Personal Exercise of the Royal Authority by His Royal Highness the Prince Regent in the Name and on the Behalf of His Majesty. (Repealed by Statute Law Revision Act 1873 (36 & 37 Vict. c. 91))
Royal Household, etc. Act 1812 (repealed)	52 Geo. 3. c. 8	11 February 1812
An Act for the Regulation of His Majesty's Household and enabling Her Majesty the Queen to meet the increased Expence to which Her Majesty may be exposed during His Majesty's Indisposition; and for the Care of His Majesty's Real and Personal Property; and to amend an Act of the last Session of Parliament, (Note: Care of King During his Illness, etc. Act 1811 (51 Geo. 3. c. 1)) to provide for the Administration of the Royal Authority during His Majesty's Illness (Repealed by Statute Law Revision Act 1873 (36 & 37 Vict. c. 91))
Duties on Coals, etc. Act 1812 (repealed)	52 Geo. 3. c. 9	28 February 1812
An Act to repeal an Act of the Twenty fifth Year of His present Majesty, (Note: Duties on Coals, etc. Act 1785 (25 Geo. 3. c. 54)) for better securing the Duties on Coals, Culm and Cinders; and making other Provisions in lieu thereof; and for requiring Ships in the Coal Trade to be measured. (Repealed by Customs Law Repeal Act 1825 (6 Geo. 4. c. 105))
East India Company Act 1812 (repealed)	52 Geo. 3. c. 10	28 February 1812
An Act to amend an Act of the Fiftieth Year of His present Majesty, (Note: Exchequer Bills (East India Company) Act 1810 (50 Geo. 3. c. 114)) for granting a Sum of Money to be raised by Exchequer Bills, to be advanced and applied in the Manner and upon the Terms therein mentioned for the Relief of the United Company of Merchants of England trading to the East Indies. (Repealed by Statute Law Revision Act 1873 (36 & 37 Vict. c. 91))
House of Commons (Offices) Act 1812 (repealed)	52 Geo. 3. c. 11	28 February 1812
An Act to repeal an Act passed in the Thirty ninth and Fortieth Year of His present Majesty, (Note: House of Commons Act 1800 (39 & 40 Geo. 3. c. 92)) for establishing certain Regulations in the Offices of the House of Commons, and to establish other and further Regulations in the said Offices. (Repealed by House of Commons (Administration) Act 1978 (c. 36))
Embezzlement of Naval, etc., Stores Act 1812 (repealed)	52 Geo. 3. c. 12	28 February 1812
An Act for extending the Laws for preventing the Embezzlement of His Majesty's Naval, Ordnance and Victualling Stores to Ireland. (Repealed by Statute Law Revision Act 1873 (36 & 37 Vict. c. 91))
Insolvent Debtors Relief (England) Act 1812 (repealed)	52 Geo. 3. c. 13	28 February 1812
An Act to alter and amend an Act, passed in the Fifty first Year of the Reign of His present Majesty, (Note: Insolvent Debtors Relief (England) Act 1811 (51 Geo. 3. c. 125)) for the Relief of certain Insolvent Debtors in England. (Repealed by Statute Law Revision Act 1873 (36 & 37 Vict. c. 91))
National Debt Act 1812 (repealed)	52 Geo. 3. c. 14	5 March 1812
An Act for granting Annuities to discharge certain Exchequer Bills. (Repealed by Statute Law Revision Act 1870 (33 & 34 Vict. c. 69))
Bounties, etc., on Sugar Act 1812 (repealed)	52 Geo. 3. c. 15	5 March 1812
An Act for further continuing, until the Twenty fifth Day of March One thousand eight hundred and thirteen, certain Bounties and Drawbacks on the Exportation of Sugar from Great Britain; and for suspending the Countervailing Duties and Bounties on Sugar, when the Duties imposed by an Act of the Forty ninth Year of His present Majesty (Note: Customs (No. 3) Act 1809 (49 Geo. 3. c. 98)) shall be suspended; and for continuing so much of an Act of the Forty seventh Year of His present Majesty (Note: Bounties on Sugar Act 1807 (47 Geo. 3 Sess. 1. c. 22)) as allows a Bounty on Raw Sugar exported, until the Twenty fifth Day of March One thousand eight hundred and thirteen. (Repealed by Statute Law Revision Act 1873 (36 & 37 Vict. c. 91))
Destruction of Stocking Frames, etc. Act 1812 or the Frame-Breaking Act 1812 (repealed)	52 Geo. 3. c. 16	20 March 1812
An Act for the more exemplary Punishment of destroying or injuring any Stocking or Lace Frames Machines or Engines used in the Framework or any Articles or Goods in such Frames to continue in force until the First Day One thousand eight hundred and fourteen. (Repealed by Destruction of Stocking Frames, etc. Act 1813 (54 Geo. 3. c. 42))
Preservation of the Peace Act 1812 (repealed)	52 Geo. 3. c. 17	20 March 1812
An Act for the more effectual Preservation of the Peace, by enforcing the Duties of Watching and Warding, until the First Day of March One thousand eight hundred and fourteen, in Places where Disturbances prevail or are apprehended. (Repealed by Statute Law Revision Act 1873 (36 & 37 Vict. c. 91))
Importation Act 1812 (repealed)	52 Geo. 3. c. 18	20 March 1812
An Act for making perpetual an Act made in the Twelfth Year of His present Majesty, (Note: Customs (No. 1) Act 1772 (12 Geo. 3. c. 50)) for encouraging the Manufacture of Leather, by lowering the Duty payable upon the Importation of Oak Bark, when the Price of such Bark shall exceed a certain Rate. (Repealed by Customs (No. 2) Act 1823 (4 Geo. 4. c. 69))
Lotteries Act 1812 (repealed)	52 Geo. 3. c. 19	20 March 1812
An Act to amend an Act of the last Session of Parliament, (Note: Lotteries Act 1811 (51 Geo. 3. c. 113)) granting to His Majesty a Sum of Money to be raised by Lotteries. (Repealed by Statute Law Revision Act 1873 (36 & 37 Vict. c. 91))
Importation, etc. Act 1812 (repealed)	52 Geo. 3. c. 20	20 March 1812
An Act to continue several Laws relating to permitting the Importation of Tobacco into Great Britain from any Place whatever, and to permitting Goods and Commodities to be imported into and exported from Nova Scotia and New Brunswick in any Ship or Vessel, until the Twenty fifth Day of March One thousand eight hundred and fifteen; and to the amending an Act for consolidating and extending the several Laws in force for allowing the Importation of certain Goods and Merchandize into and from certain Ports in the West Indies, until the Twenty fifth Day of March One thousand eight hundred and fourteen. (Repealed by Statute Law Revision Act 1873 (36 & 37 Vict. c. 91))
Validity of Certain Oaths Act 1812 (repealed)	52 Geo. 3. c. 21	20 March 1812
An Act to render valid and effectual certain Oaths administered to and taken by certain Members of the House of Commons before Deputies of the late Lord Steward of His Majesty's Household, during the Vacancy of the said Office. (Repealed by Statute Law Revision Act 1873 (36 & 37 Vict. c. 91))
Mutiny Act 1812 (repealed)	52 Geo. 3. c. 22	20 March 1812
An Act for punishing Mutiny and Desertion; and for the better Payment of the Army and their Quarters. (Repealed by Statute Law Revision Act 1873 (36 & 37 Vict. c. 91))
Marine Mutiny Act 1812 (repealed)	52 Geo. 3. c. 23	20 March 1812
An Act for the Regulating of His Majesty's Royal Marine Forces while on Shore (Repealed by Statute Law Revision Act 1873 (36 & 37 Vict. c. 91))
National Debt (No. 2) Act 1812 (repealed)	52 Geo. 3. c. 24	25 March 1812
An Act for raising the Sum of Six millions seven hundred and eighty nine thousand six hundred and twenty five Pounds by way of Annuities. (Repealed by Statute Law Revision Act 1870 (33 & 34 Vict. c. 69))
Exportation Act 1812 (repealed)	52 Geo. 3. c. 25	25 March 1812
An Act to continue until the Twenty fifth Day of March One thousand eight hundred and thirteen, an Act (Note: Drawbacks (Ireland) Act 1807 (47 Geo. 3 Sess. 1. c. 19)) for regulating the Drawbacks and Bounties on the Exportation of Sugar from Ireland. (Repealed by Statute Law Revision Act 1873 (36 & 37 Vict. c. 91))
Indemnity Act 1812 (repealed)	52 Geo. 3. c. 26	25 March 1812
An Act to indemnify such Persons in the United Kingdom as have omitted to qualify themselves for Offices and Employments, and for extending the Times limited for those Purposes respectively, until the Twenty fifth Day of March One thousand eight hundred and thirteen; and to permit such Persons in Great Britain as have omitted to make and file Affidavits of the Execution of Indentures of Clerks to Attornies and Solicitors, to make and file the same on or before the First Day of Hilary Term One thousand eight hundred and thirteen. (Repealed by Promissory Oaths Act 1871 (34 & 35 Vict. c. 48))
Army Act 1812 (repealed)	52 Geo. 3. c. 27	20 April 1812
An Act for enabling the Wives and Families of Soldiers embarked in Ireland for Foreign Service to return to their Homes. (Repealed by Army Act 1832 (2 & 3 Will. 4. c. 97))
Relief of Families of Militiamen (Ireland) Act 1812 (repealed)	52 Geo. 3. c. 28	20 April 1812
An Act to amend an Act of the last Session of Parliament, (Note: Relief of Families of Militiamen (Ireland) Act 1811 (51 Geo. 3. c. 78)) making Provision for the Families of Militia Men in Ireland. (Repealed by Militia (Voluntary Enlistment) Act 1875 (38 & 39 Vict. c. 69))
Militia (Ireland) Act 1812 (repealed)	52 Geo. 3. c. 29	20 April 1812
An Act to amend the Laws relating to the Militia of Ireland. (Repealed by Statute Law Revision Act 1873 (36 & 37 Vict. c. 91), Militia (Voluntary Enlistment) Act 1875 (38 & 39 Vict. c. 69) and Militia Act 1882 (45 & 46 Vict. c. 49))
Warehousing of Spirits (Ireland) Act 1812 (repealed)	52 Geo. 3. c. 30	20 April 1812
An Act to provide for regulating the Warehousing of Spirits distilled from Corn in Ireland, for Exportation, without Payment of the Duty of Excise chargeable thereon; and to transfer the Custody of Spirits so warehoused, from the Commissioners of Customs and Port Duties in Ireland, and their Officers, to the Commissioners of Inland Excise and Taxes in Ireland, and their Officers. (Repealed by Statute Law Revision Act 1861 (24 & 25 Vict. c. 101))
Repeal of 39 Eliz. 1. c. 17 Act 1812 (repealed)	52 Geo. 3. c. 31	20 April 1812
An act to repeal an Act made in the Thirty ninth Year of the Reign of Queen Elizabeth, intituled "An act against lewd and wandering Persons pretending themselves to be Soldiers or Mariners." (Note: Vagabonds (No. 2) Act 1597 (39 Eliz. 1. c. 17)) (Repealed by Statute Law Revision Act 1873 (36 & 37 Vict. c. 91))
Infant Suitors in Equity Entitled to Stock Act 1812 (repealed)	52 Geo. 3. c. 32	20 April 1812
An Act for the Relief of Infant Suitors in Courts of Equity, entitled to Stock or Annuities in any of the Public or other Funds transferrable, at the Bank of England. (Repealed by Infants, Lunatics, etc. Act 1825 (6 Geo. 4. c. 74))
Importation (No. 2) Act 1812 (repealed)	52 Geo. 3. c. 33	20 April 1812
An Act to continue, until the Expiration of Six Months after the Conclusion of the present War, an Act made in the Forty sixth Year of His present Majesty, (Note: Importation (No. 4) Act 1806 (46 Geo. 3. c. 117)) for permitting the Importation of Masts, Yards, Bowsprits and Timber for Naval Purposes, from the British Colonies in North America, Duty free. (Repealed by Statute Law Revision Act 1873 (36 & 37 Vict. c. 91))
Debtors Relief Act 1812 (repealed)	52 Geo. 3. c. 34	20 April 1812
An Act for altering and amending an Act made in the Thirty second Year of the Reign of His late Majesty King George the Second, (Note: Debtors Imprisonment Act 1758 (32 Geo. 2. c. 28)) for the Relief of Debtors, with respect to the Imprisonment of their Persons, and of an Act made in the Thirty ninth Year of His present Majesty, (Note: Relief of Debtors Act 1799 (39 Geo. 3. c. 50)) for making perpetual an Act made in the Thirty third Year of His present Majesty, (Note: Debtors Relief Act 1793 (33 Geo. 3. c. 5)) for the further Relief of Debtors; and for other Purposes in the said Act expressed. (Repealed by Statute Law Revision Act 1861 (24 & 25 Vict. c. 101))
Jamaica and Saint Domingo Act 1812 (repealed)	52 Geo. 3. c. 35	20 April 1812
An Act to prohibit all Intercourse between the Island of Jamaica and certain Parts of the Island of Saint Domingo. (Repealed by Customs Law Repeal Act 1825 (6 Geo. 4. c. 105))
Duties on Mahogany, etc. Act 1812 (repealed)	52 Geo. 3. c. 36	20 April 1812
An Act for granting additional Duties on Mahogany not imported from the Bay of Honduras, and for reducing the Duties on certain Species of Wood imported from the said Bay. (Repealed by Statute Law Revision Act 1861 (24 & 25 Vict. c. 101))
Annuity to Duke of Wellington Act 1812 (repealed)	52 Geo. 3. c. 37	20 April 1812
An Act for settling and securing a certain Annuity on Earl Wellington and the Two next Persons to whom the Title of Earl Wellington shall descend, in Consideration of his eminent Services. (Repealed by Statute Law Revision Act 1953 (2 & 3 Eliz. 2. c. 5))
Local Militia (England) Act 1812 (repealed)	52 Geo. 3. c. 38	20 April 1812
An Act for amending the Laws relating to the Local Militia in England. (Repealed by Territorial Army and Militia Act 1921 (11 & 12 Geo. 5. c. 37))
Pilotage Act 1812 (repealed)	52 Geo. 3. c. 39	20 April 1812
An Act for the more effectual Regulation of Pilots, and of the Pilotage of Ships and Vessels on the Coast of England. (Repealed by Pilotage Act 1825 (6 Geo. 4. c. 125))
Grants of Officers Act 1812 (repealed)	52 Geo. 3. c. 40	20 April 1812
An Act to make Provision for a limited Time respecting certain Grants of Offices. (Repealed by Statute Law Revision Act 1873 (36 & 37 Vict. c. 91))
Expenditure, etc., of Office of Works, etc. Act 1812 (repealed)	52 Geo. 3. c. 41	20 April 1812
An Act to amend and continue until the Twenty fifth Day of March One thousand eight hundred and thirteen, an Act of the Forty fifth Year of His present Majesty, (Note: Inquiry into Military Departments Act 1805 (45 Geo. 3. c. 47)) for appointing Commissioners to enquire into the Public Expenditure and the Conduct of the Public Business, in the Military Departments therein mentioned; and another Act of the Fifty first Year of His present Majesty, (Note: Inquiry into Military Expenditure, etc. Act 1811 (51 Geo. 3. c. 19)) for continuing and extending the same to Public Works executed by the Office of Works and others. (Repealed by Statute Law Revision Act 1873 (36 & 37 Vict. c. 91))
Bounties on Pilchards Act 1812 (repealed)	52 Geo. 3. c. 42	20 April 1812
An Act for amending the Laws relating to the Allowance of the Bounties on Pilchards exported until the Twenty-fourth Day of June One thousand eight hundred and nineteen. (Repealed by Sea Fisheries Act 1868 (31 & 32 Vict. c. 45))
Quartering of Soldiers Act 1812 (repealed)	52 Geo. 3. c. 43	20 April 1812
An Act for increasing the Rates of Subsistence to be paid to Innkeepers and others on quartering Soldiers. (Repealed by Statute Law Revision Act 1873 (36 & 37 Vict. c. 91))
Penitentiary House, etc. Act 1812 (repealed)	52 Geo. 3. c. 44	20 April 1812
An Act for the Erection of a Penitentiary House for the Confinement of Offenders convicted within the City of London and County of Middlesex; and for making Compensation to Jeremy Bentham Esquire, for the Non-performance of an Agreement between the said Jeremy Bentham and the Lords Commissioners of His Majesty's Treasury, respecting the Custody and Maintenance of Convicts. (Repealed by Statute Law Revision Act 1873 (36 & 37 Vict. c. 91))
Exportation (No. 2) Act 1812 (repealed)	52 Geo. 3. c. 45	5 May 1812
An Act to suspend the Exportation from Ireland to Parts beyond the Seas of Spirits made or distilled in Ireland from Corn or Grain, until the Thirty first Day of December One thousand eight hundred and twelve. (Repealed by Statute Law Revision Act 1873 (36 & 37 Vict. c. 91))
Duties on Spirits (Ireland) Act 1812 (repealed)	52 Geo. 3. c. 46	5 May 1812
An Act to grant to His Majesty Duties upon Spirits made or distilled in Ireland and to allow certain Drawbacks on the Exportation thereof and to repeal certain Bounties given to Persons licensed to sell Spirituous Liquors, Wine, Beer, and Ale by Retail in Ireland. (Repealed by Statute Law Revision Act 1861 (24 & 25 Vict. c. 101))
Distillation (Ireland) Act 1812 (repealed)	52 Geo. 3. c. 47	5 May 1812
An Act to revive and continue until the Thirty first Day of December One thousand eight hundred and twelve, so much of an Act made in the Forty ninth Year of His present Majesty, to prohibit the Distillation of Spirits from Corn or Grain in the United Kingdom, as relates to Ireland. (Repealed by Statute Law Revision Act 1873 (36 & 37 Vict. c. 91))
Duties on Spirits (Ireland) (No. 2) Act 1812 (repealed)	52 Geo. 3. c. 48	5 May 1812
An Act to provide for the regulating and securing the Collection of the Duties on Spirits distilled in Ireland from Corn, malted or unmalted, in Stills of and under One hundred Gallons Content. (Repealed by Statute Law Revision Act 1861 (24 & 25 Vict. c. 101))
Purchase of London Quays Act 1812 (repealed)	52 Geo. 3. c. 49	5 May 1812
An Act to continue the Period for purchasing the Legal Quays in the Port of London; and to enable the Lords of the Treasury to purchase Buildings in Thames Street, for the Purpose of erecting a new Custom House. (Note: Custom House, City of London.) (Repealed by Statute Law (Repeals) Act 1993 (c. 50))
Gold Currency, etc. Act 1812 (repealed)	52 Geo. 3. c. 50	5 May 1812
An Act to continue until Three Months after the Commencement of the next Session of Parliament, and amend an Act of the last Session of Parliament, (Note: Gold Currency and Bank Notes Act 1811 (51 Geo. 3. c. 127)) for making more effectual Provision for preventing the current Gold Coin of the Realm from being paid or accepted for a greater Value than the current Value of such Coin; for preventing any Note or Bill of the Governor and Company of the Bank of England from being received for any smaller Sum than the Sum therein specified; and for staying Proceedings upon any Distress by tender of such Notes; and to extend the same to Ireland. (Repealed by Statute Law Revision Act 1873 (36 & 37 Vict. c. 91))
Audit of Military Accounts (Ireland) Act 1812 (repealed)	52 Geo. 3. c. 51	5 May 1812
An Act to provide for the more speedy Examination, controuling and finally auditing the Military Accounts of Ireland. (Repealed by Military Accounts (Ireland) Act 1831 (1 & 2 Will. 4. c. 52))
Audit of Public Accounts (Ireland) Act 1812 (repealed)	52 Geo. 3. c. 52	5 May 1812
An Act to provide for the speedy and regular Examination and Audit of the Public Accounts of Ireland; and to repeal certain former Acts relating thereto. (Repealed by Exchequer and Audit Departments Act 1866 (29 & 30 Vict. c. 39))
Auction Duty Act 1812 (repealed)	52 Geo. 3. c. 53	5 May 1812
An Act for extending the Time in which Coffee of the British Plantations may be sold by Auction without Payment of the Duty on Auctions; and for making an Allowance of such Duty on Coffee sold for which the said Duty has not been paid. (Repealed by Statute Law Revision Act 1861 (24 & 25 Vict. c. 101))
Duties on Glass Act 1812 (repealed)	52 Geo. 3. c. 54	5 May 1812
An Act for continuing, until the First Day of August One thou fand eight hundred and thirteen, several Laws relating to the Duties on Glass made in Great Britain. (Repealed by Statute Law Revision Act 1873 (36 & 37 Vict. c. 91))
Trade of Canada Act 1812 (repealed)	52 Geo. 3. c. 55	5 May 1812
An Act to prevent Foreign Goods of certain Descriptions being brought from the United States of America into Canada; and to allow a greater Quantity of Worsted Yarn to be exported from Great Britain to Canada. (Repealed by Customs Law Repeal Act 1825 (6 Geo. 4. c. 105))
Pension Duties Act 1812 (repealed)	52 Geo. 3. c. 56	5 May 1812
An Act to explain and amend an Act passed in the Fiftieth Year of His present Majesty, (Note: Pension Duties Act 1810 (50 Geo. 3. c. 56)) for explaining and amending an Act (Note: Pension Duties Act 1809 (49 Geo. 3. c. 32)) for Continuing and making perpetual several Duties of One Shilling and Six pence in the Pound on Offices and Employments of Profit, and on Annuities, Pensions and Stipends. (Repealed by Statute Law Revision Act 1958 (6 & 7 Eliz. 2. c. 46))
Annuities to Princesses Act 1812 (repealed)	52 Geo. 3. c. 57	5 May 1812
An Act to enable His Majesty to settle on their Royal Highnesses the Princesses Augusta Sophia, Elizabeth, Mary and Sophia, an Annuity of Thirty six thousand Pounds, instead of the Annuity settled on them by an Act passed in the Eighteenth Year of His present Majesty. (Note: Settlement on Royal Princes, etc. Act 1778 (18 Geo. 3. c. 31)) (Repealed by Statute Law Revision Act 1873 (36 & 37 Vict. c. 91))
Excise Act 1812 (repealed)	52 Geo. 3. c. 58	20 May 1812
An Act to grant to His Majesty certain Duties of Excise on Tobacco to be manufactured in Ireland; and to allow certain Drawbacks in respect thereof, in lieu of former Duties of Excise and Drawbacks; and to provide for the regulating and securing the Collection of the said Duties. (Repealed by Tobacco Act 1840 (3 & 4 Vict. c. 18))
Plate (Drawback on Exportation) Act 1812 (repealed)	52 Geo. 3. c. 59	20 May 1812
An Act for allowing on the Exportation of manufactured Plate for the private Use of Persons residing or going to reside abroad, the same Drawback as is now allowed on the Exportation of such Plate by way of Merchandize. (Repealed by Customs and Inland Revenue Act 1890 (53 & 54 Vict. c. 8))
Customs Act (No. 2) 1812 (repealed)	52 Geo. 3. c. 60	20 May 1812
An Act for altering the Mode of Payment of the Superannuation Allowances in the Department of the Customs in Scotland. (Repealed by Statute Law Revision Act 1861 (24 & 25 Vict. c. 101))
Excise (No. 2) Act 1812 (repealed)	52 Geo. 3. c. 61	9 June 1812
An Act to grant an Excise Duty on Spirits made or distilled from Sugar in Ireland, during the Prohibition of Distillation from Corn or Grain there, in lieu of the Excise Duty now chargeable thereon, and to allow a Drawback on the Export thereof. (Repealed by Statute Law Revision Act 1873 (36 & 37 Vict. c. 91))
Coadjutors to Bishops in Ireland Act 1812	52 Geo. 3. c. 62	9 June 1812
An Act to enable Coadjutors to Archbishops and Bishops in Ireland to execute the Powers of Archbishops and Bishops respectively.
Embezzlement by Bankers, etc. Act 1812 (repealed)	52 Geo. 3. c. 63	9 June 1812
An Act for more effectually preventing the Embezzlement of Securities for Money and other Effects, left or deposited for safe Custody, or other special Purpose, in the Hands of Bankers, Merchants, Brokers, Attornies or other Agents. (Repealed for England and Wales by Criminal Statutes Repeal Act 1827 (7 & 8 Geo. 4. c. 27), for Ireland by Criminal Statutes (Ireland) Repeal Act 1828 (9 Geo. 4. c. 53) and for India by Criminal Law (India) Act 1828 (9 Geo. 4. c. 74))
Obtaining Bonds, etc., Under False Pretences Act 1812 (repealed)	52 Geo. 3. c. 64	9 June 1812
An Act for extending the Provisions of an Act of the Thirtieth Year of King George the Second, (Note: Obtaining Money by False Pretences, etc. Act 1757 (30 Geo. 2. c. 24)) against Persons obtaining Money by false Pretences, to Persons so obtaining Bonds and other Securities. (Repealed by Statute Law Revision Act 1861 (24 & 25 Vict. c. 101))
Use of Sugar in Brewing (Great Britain) Act 1812 (repealed)	52 Geo. 3. c. 65	9 June 1812
An Act to allow the Use of Sugar in Brewing Beer in Great Britain. (Repealed by Statute Law Revision Act 1873 (36 & 37 Vict. c. 91))
Security of Public Officers Act 1812 (repealed)	52 Geo. 3. c. 66	9 June 1812
An Act to explain and amend an Act of the Fiftieth Year of His present Majesty, to regulate the taking of Securities in all Offices in respect of which Security ought to be given, and for avoiding the Grant of all such Offices in the Event of such Security not being given within a time to be limited after the Grant of such Offices. (Repealed by Statute Law (Repeals) Act 1974 (c. 22))
Family of Right Honourable Spencer Perceval Act 1812 (repealed)	52 Geo. 3. c. 67	9 June 1812
An Act for settling and securing certain Annuities on the Widow and eldest Son of the late Right Honourable Spencer Perceval, and for granting a Sum of Money for the Use of his other Children. (Repealed by Statute Law Revision Act 1873 (36 & 37 Vict. c. 91))
Local Militia (Scotland) Act 1812 (repealed)	52 Geo. 3. c. 68	20 June 1812
An Act for amending the Laws relating to the Local Militia in Scotland. (Repealed by Territorial Army and Militia Act 1921 (11 & 12 Geo. 5. c. 37))
Importation and Exportation Act 1812 (repealed)	52 Geo. 3. c. 69	20 June 1812
An Act to continue until the Fifth Day of July One thousand eight hundred and thirteen, several Acts for granting certain Rates and Duties, and for allowing certain Drawbacks and Bounties on Goods, Wares and Merchandize, imported into and exported from Ireland. (Repealed by Statute Law Revision Act 1873 (36 & 37 Vict. c. 91))
National Debt (No. 3) Act 1812 (repealed)	52 Geo. 3. c. 70	20 June 1812
An Act for raising the Sum of One million five hundred thou fand Pounds by way of Annuities and Treasury Bills for the Service of Ireland. (Repealed by Statute Law Revision Act 1870 (33 & 34 Vict. c. 69))
Woolmer Forest Act 1812 (repealed)	52 Geo. 3. c. 71	20 June 1812
An Act for the better Cultivation of Navy Timber in the Forest of Woolmer, in the County of Southampton. (Repealed by Crown Estate Act 1961 (9 & 10 Eliz. 2. c. 55) and Wild Creatures and Forest Laws Act 1971 (c. 47))
Alice Holt Forest Act 1812 (repealed)	52 Geo. 3. c. 72	20 June 1812
An Act for the better Cultivation of Navy Timber in the Forest of Alice Holt, in the County of Southampton. (Repealed by Crown Estate Act 1961 (9 & 10 Eliz. 2. c. 55) and Wild Creatures and Forest Laws Act 1971 (c. 47))
Relief of the Poor (England) Act 1812 (repealed)	52 Geo. 3. c. 73	27 June 1812
An Act for repealing so much of an Act of the Thirty sixth Year of His present Majesty, (Note: Poor Relief Act 1795 (36 Geo. 3. c. 10)) for the better Relief of the Poor within England; and enlarging the Powers of the Guardians of the Poor, as limits the annual Amount of the Assessments. (Repealed by Statute Law Revision Act 1873 (36 & 37 Vict. c. 91))
Bogs (Ireland) Act 1812 (repealed)	52 Geo. 3. c. 74	27 June 1812
An Act to continue until the First Day of January One thousand eight hundred and fourteen, an Act (Note: Drainage of Bogs, etc. (Ireland) Act 1809 (49 Geo. 3. c. 102)) for appointing Commissioners to enquire and examine into the Nature and Extent of the several Bogs in Ireland, and the Practicability of draining and cultivating them, and the best Means of effecting the same. (Repealed by Statute Law Revision Act 1873 (36 & 37 Vict. c. 91))
Crown Debt of Abraham Goldsmid, etc. Act 1812 (repealed)	52 Geo. 3. c. 75	27 June 1812
An Act to provide for the more complete and effectual Liquidation of a Debt due to His Majesty from the late Abraham Goldsmid, Merchant, and his surviving Partners; and to confirm and establish certain Agreements entered into for that and other Purposes relating thereto. (Repealed by Statute Law Revision Act 1950 (14 Geo. 6. c. 6))
Customs, etc. (Ireland) Act 1812 (repealed)	52 Geo. 3. c. 76	1 July 1812
An Act to amend several Acts relating to the Revenue of Customs and Port Duties in Ireland. (Repealed by Customs Law Repeal Act 1825 (6 Geo. 4. c. 105))
Drawback, etc., on Glass Act 1812 (repealed)	52 Geo. 3. c. 77	1 July 1812
An Act for granting an additional Drawback on Flint, Phial and Crown Glass; for charging an additional Countervailing Duty on Flint and Crown Glass imported from Ireland; and for the better Prevention of Frauds in the Exportation of Glass on Drawback. (Repealed by Glass Duties Act 1838 (1 & 2 Vict. c. 44))
Appeal in Revenue Cases (Ireland) Act 1812 (repealed)	52 Geo. 3. c. 78	1 July 1812
An Act to make better Provision for the Commissioners of Appeal in Revenue Causes in Ireland. (Repealed by Statute Law Revision Act 1873 (36 & 37 Vict. c. 91))
Importation and Exportation (No. 2) Act 1812 (repealed)	52 Geo. 3. c. 79	1 July 1812
An Act to allow British Plantation Sugar and Coffee, imported into Bermuda in British Ships, to be exported to the Territories of the United States of America in Foreign Ships or Vessels; and to permit Articles, the Production of the said United States, to be imported into the said Island in Foreign Ships or Vessels. (Repealed by Statute Law Revision Act 1873 (36 & 37 Vict. c. 91))
Land Tax Redemption Act 1812 (repealed)	52 Geo. 3. c. 80	1 July 1812
An Act for extending the Period in which Deeds were directed to be enrolled by an Act of the Fiftieth Year of His present Majesty, (Note: Land Tax Redemption Act 1810 (50 Geo. 3. c. 58)) for amending several Acts for the Redemption and Sale of the Land Tax. (Repealed by Statute Law Revision Act 1873 (36 & 37 Vict. c. 91))
Excise Officers Allowance Act 1812 (repealed)	52 Geo. 3. c. 81	1 July 1812
An Act to amend an Act made in the Forty ninth Year of His present Majesty, (Note: Officers of Excise (No. 2) Act 1809 (49 Geo. 3. c. 96)) for providing a durable Allowance of Superannuation to the Officers of Excise, under certain Restrictions. (Repealed by Statute Law Revision Act 1861 (24 & 25 Vict. c. 101))
Transfer of Scotch Excise Charity, etc. Act 1812 (repealed)	52 Geo. 3. c. 82	1 July 1812
An Act for transferring the Scotch Excise Charity and Superannuation Funds to the Consolidated Fund, and paying all future Allowances from the latter Fund, and for making Provision for certain superannuated Officers of Excise in England and Scotland. (Repealed by Statute Law Revision Act 1861 (24 & 25 Vict. c. 101))
Militia Allowances Act 1812 (repealed)	52 Geo. 3. c. 83	1 July 1812
An Act to revive and continue, until the Twenty fifth Day of March One thousand eight hundred and thirteen, and amend so much of an Act, made in the Thirty ninth and Fortieth Year of His present Majesty, (Note: Militia Allowances Act 1800 (39 & 40 Geo. 3. c. 44)) as grants certain Allowances to Adjutants and Serjeant Majors of the Militia of England, disembodied under an Act (Note: Militia Act 1799 (39 & 40 Geo. 3. c. 1)) of the same Session of Parliament. (Repealed by Statute Law Revision Act 1873 (36 & 37 Vict. c. 91))
Militia Allowances (No. 2) Act 1812 (repealed)	52 Geo. 3. c. 84	1 July 1812
An Act for making Allowances in certain cases to Subaltern Officers of the Militia in Great Britain, while disembodied. (Repealed by Statute Law Revision Act 1873 (36 & 37 Vict. c. 91))
National Debt (No. 4) Act 1812 (repealed)	52 Geo. 3. c. 85	1 July 1812
An Act for raising the Sum of Twenty two millions five hundred thousand Pounds by way of Annuities. (Repealed by Statute Law Revision Act 1870 (33 & 34 Vict. c. 69))
Exchequer Bills (No. 3) Act 1812 (repealed)	52 Geo. 3. c. 86	9 July 1812
An Act for raising the Sum of Five Millions, by Exchequer Bills, for the Service of Great Britain, for the Year One thousand eight hundred and twelve. (Repealed by Statute Law Revision Act 1873 (36 & 37 Vict. c. 91))
Stamp Duties, etc. (Ireland) Act 1812 (repealed)	52 Geo. 3. c. 87	9 July 1812
An Act to repeal the several Duties under the Care of the Commissioners for managing the Stamp Duties in Ireland, and to grant new Duties in lieu thereof; and for transferring the Management of the Duties on Playing Cards and Dice from the Commissioners of Inland Excise to the Commissioners of Stamp Duties. (Repealed by Statute Law Revision Act 1861 (24 & 25 Vict. c. 101))
Postage Act 1812 (repealed)	52 Geo. 3. c. 88	9 July 1812
An Act for granting to His Majesty certain additional Rates of Postage in Great Britain. (Repealed by Post Office (Repeal of Laws) Act 1837 (7 Will. 4 & 1 Vict. c. 32))
Customs Act (No. 3) 1812 (repealed)	52 Geo. 3. c. 89	9 July 1812
An Act for charging an additional Duty on Copper imported into Great Britain, until the Expiration of Six Calendar Months after the Ratification of a Definite Treaty of Peace. (Repealed by Statute Law Revision Act 1873 (36 & 37 Vict. c. 91))
Treasury Bills (Ireland) Act 1812 (repealed)	52 Geo. 3. c. 90	9 July 1812
An Act for raising the Sum of Five hundred thousand Pounds by Treasury Bills for the Service of Ireland, for the Year One thousand eight hundred and twelve. (Repealed by Statute Law Revision Act 1873 (36 & 37 Vict. c. 91))
Peace Preservation (Ireland) Act 1812 (repealed)	52 Geo. 3. c. 91	9 July 1812
An Act to continue, until the Twenty fifth Day of One thousand eight hundred and fourteen, an Act made in the Parliament of Ireland, in the Twenty seventh Year of His present Majesty, for the better Execution of the Law and Preservation of the Peace within Counties at large. (Repealed by Statute Law Revision Act 1873 (36 & 37 Vict. c. 91))
Fees in Public Offices, etc. (Ireland) Act 1812 (repealed)	52 Geo. 3. c. 92	9 July 1812
An Act to continue until the First Day of August One thousand eight hundred and thirteen, certain Acts for appointing Commissioners to enquire into the Fees, Gratuities, Perquisites and Emoluments received in several Public Offices in Ireland; to examine into any Abuses which may exist in the same and into the mode of receiving, collecting, issuing and accounting for Public Money in Ireland. (Repealed by Statute Law Revision Act 1873 (36 & 37 Vict. c. 91))
Assessed Taxes Act 1812 (repealed)	52 Geo. 3. c. 93	9 July 1812
An Act for granting to His Majesty certain new and additional Duties of Assessed Taxes; and for consolidating the same with the former Duties of Assessed Taxes. (Repealed by Revenue Act 1869 (32 & 33 Vict. c. 14))
Excise (No. 3) Act 1812 (repealed)	52 Geo. 3. c. 94	9 July 1812
An Act for granting to His Majesty additional Duties of Excise in Great Britain on Glass, Hides, and Tobacco and Snuff. (Repealed by Statute Law Revision Act 1861 (24 & 25 Vict. c. 101))
Taxes (Scotland) Act 1812 (repealed)	52 Geo. 3. c. 95	9 July 1812
An Act to amend and regulate the Assessment and Collection of the Assessed Taxes, and of the Rates and Duties on Profits arising from Property, Professions, Trades and Offices, in that Part of Great Britain called Scotland. (Repealed by Taxes Management Act 1880 (43 & 44 Vict. c. 19))
Application of Bounties on Linen, etc. Act 1812 (repealed)	52 Geo. 3. c. 96	9 July 1812
An Act for applying the Amount of the Bounties on certain Linens exported from Great Britain towards defraying the Charge of the Loan made and Stock created in the present Session of Parliament. (Repealed by Statute Law Revision Act 1861 (24 & 25 Vict. c. 101))
Inland Excise and Taxes (Ireland) Act 1812 (repealed)	52 Geo. 3. c. 97	9 July 1812
An Act to amend several Acts relating to the Revenue of Inland Excise and Taxes in Ireland. (Repealed by Illicit Distillation (Ireland) Act 1831 (1 & 2 Will. 4. c. 55))
Colonial Trade Act 1812 (repealed)	52 Geo. 3. c. 98	9 July 1812
An Act to permit Sugar, Coffee and Cocoa to be exported from His Majesty's Colonies or Plantations to any Port in Europe to the Southward of Cape Finisterre, and Corn to be imported from any such Port, and from the Coast of Africa, into the said Colonies and Plantations, under Licences granted by the Collectors and Controllers of the Customs. (Repealed by Trade Act (No. 2) 1822 (3 Geo. 4. c. 45))
Bahama Islands Trade Act 1812 (repealed)	52 Geo. 3. c. 99	9 July 1812
An Act for allowing certain Articles to be imported into the Bahama Islands and exported therefrom in Foreign Vessels; and for encouraging the Exportation of Salt from the said Islands. (Repealed by Trade Act 1822 (3 Geo. 4. c. 44))
Trade of West Indies Act 1812 (repealed)	52 Geo. 3. c. 100	9 July 1812
An Act for allowing certain Articles to be imported into the Bahama Islands, and exported therefrom in Foreign Vessels; and for encouraging the Exportation of Salt from the said Islands. (Repealed by Customs Law Repeal Act 1825 (6 Geo. 4. c. 105))
Charities Procedure Act 1812 (repealed)	52 Geo. 3. c. 101	9 July 1812
An Act to provide a summary Remedy in Cases of Abuses of Trusts created for Charitable Purposes. (Repealed by Charities Act 1960 (c. 58) and for Northern Ireland by Charities Act (Northern Ireland) 1964 (1964 c. 33 (N.I.)))
Charitable Donations Registration Act 1812 (repealed)	52 Geo. 3. c. 102	9 July 1812
An Act for the registering and securing of Charitable Donations. (Repealed by Charities Act 1960 (8 & 9 Eliz. 2. c. 58))
Southern Whale Fishery Act 1812 (repealed)	52 Geo. 3. c. 103	9 July 1812
An Act for the more easy Manning of Vessels employed in the Southern Whale Fishery. (Repealed by Southern Whale Fishery Act 1813 (53 Geo. 3. c. 111))
Unlawful Oaths Act 1812 (repealed)	52 Geo. 3. c. 104	9 July 1812
An Act to render more effectual an Act, passed in the Thirty seventh Year of His present Majesty, (Note: Unlawful Oaths Act 1797 (37 Geo. 3. c. 123)) for preventing the administering or taking Unlawful Oaths. (Repealed by Statute Law (Repeals) Act 1981 (c. 19))
Militia Returns Act 1812 (repealed)	52 Geo. 3. c. 105	9 July 1812
An act to continue, amend and extend the Provisions of an Act passed in the Forty eighth Year of His present Majesty, (Note: Defence of the Realm Act 1808 (48 Geo. 3. c. 107)) for enabling the Secretary at War to enforce Returns from Clerks of Subdivisions and others, in relation to Fines, Bounties and Sums due under any Acts relating to the Defence of the Realm or Militia, for the Purpose of directing the Distribution and securing the due Application thereof. (Repealed by Territorial Army and Militia Act 1921 (11 & 12 Geo. 5. c. 37))
Duty of Spirits, Newfoundland Act 1812 (repealed)	52 Geo. 3. c. 106	9 July 1812
An Act for increasing the Duty on Rum and other Spirits imported into Newfoundland from the British Colonies and Plantations on the Continent of America, and charging a Duty on Spirits imported into Newfoundland from His Majesty's Colonies in the West Indies. (Repealed by Customs Law Repeal Act 1825 (6 Geo. 4. c. 105))
Duty on Salt Act 1812 (repealed)	52 Geo. 3. c. 107	9 July 1812
An Act for extending the Allowance of the Duty on Salt used in making Oxiginated Muriatic Acid for bleaching Linen, to Salt used in making such Acid for bleaching Thread and Cotton Twist. (Repealed by Statute Law Revision Act 1861 (24 & 25 Vict. c. 101))
Hawkers Act 1812 (repealed)	52 Geo. 3. c. 108	9 July 1812
An Act to amend an Act passed in the Fiftieth Year of His present Majesty, (Note: Hawkers Act 1810 (50 Geo. 3. c. 41)) for placing the Duties of Hawkers and Pedlars under the Management of the Commissioners of Hackney Coaches. (Repealed by Hawkers Act 1888 (51 & 52 Vict. c. 33))
Chelsea Hospital Act 1812 (repealed)	52 Geo. 3. c. 109	9 July 1812
An Act to empower the Commissioners of Chelsea Hospital to commute Pensions for a Sum of Money in certain Cases. (Repealed by Chelsea and Kilmainham Hospitals Act 1826 (7 Geo. 4. c. 16))
Bridges Act 1812 (repealed)	52 Geo. 3. c. 110	9 July 1812
An act for amending an Act passed in the Twelfth Year of His late Majesty King George the Second, intituled "An act for the more easy assessing, collecting and levying of County Rates;" (Note: County Rates Act 1738 (12 Geo. 2. c. 29)) and for the remedying certain Defects in the Laws relating to the repairing of County Bridges and other Works maintained at the Expence of the Inhabitants of Counties in England. (Repealed by Highways Act 1959 (7 & 8 Eliz. 2. c. 25))
Militia Pay (Great Britain) Act 1812 (repealed)	52 Geo. 3. c. 111	9 July 1812
An Act for defraying the Charge of the Pay and Clothing of the Militia and Local Militia in Great Britain for the Year One thousand eight hundred and twelve. (Repealed by Statute Law Revision Act 1873 (36 & 37 Vict. c. 91))
Militia Pay (Ireland) Act 1812 (repealed)	52 Geo. 3. c. 112	9 July 1812
An Act for defraying until the Twenty fifth Day of March One thousand eight hundred and thirteen, the Charge of the Pay and Clothing of the Militia of Ireland; and for making Allowances in certain Cases to Subaltern Officers of the said Militia during Peace. (Repealed by Statute Law Revision Act 1873 (36 & 37 Vict. c. 91))
Treasury Bills (Ireland) (No. 2) Act 1812 (repealed)	52 Geo. 3. c. 113	9 July 1812
An Act for railing the Sum of One million two hundred and sixteen thousand six hundred and sixty six Pounds Thirteen Shillings and Four pence Irish Currency, by Treasury Bills, for the Service of Ireland for the Year One thousand eight hundred and twelve. (Repealed by Statute Law Revision Act 1873 (36 & 37 Vict. c. 91))
Exchequer Bills (No. 4) Act 1812 (repealed)	52 Geo. 3. c. 114	9 July 1812
An Act to enable the Commissioners of His Majesty's Treasury to issue Exchequer Bills on the Credit of such Aids or Supplies as have been or shall be granted by Parliament for the Service of Great Britain for the Year One thousand eight hundred and twelve. (Repealed by Statute Law Revision Act 1873 (36 & 37 Vict. c. 91))
Port of Dublin Lighthouses Act 1812 (repealed)	52 Geo. 3. c. 115	9 July 1812
An Act to make more effectual Provision for enabling the Corporation for preserving and improving the Port of Dublin, to erect, repair and maintain Light Houses and Lights round the Coasts of Ireland, and to raise a Fund for defraying the Charge thereof. (Repealed by Merchant Shipping Repeal Act 1854 (17 & 18 Vict. c. 120))
Local Militia (Exemption) Act 1812 (repealed)	52 Geo. 3. c. 116	13 July 1812
An act to amend an Act of this Session of Parliament (Note: Local Militia (England) Act 1812 (52 Geo. 3. c. 38)) for amending the Laws relating to the Local Militia of England. (Repealed by Territorial Army and Militia Act 1921 (11 & 12 Geo. 5. c. 37))
Customs Act (No. 4) 1812 (repealed)	52 Geo. 3. c. 117	13 July 1812
An Act for imposing additional Duties of Customs on certain Species of Wood, and on Pot and Pearl Ashes imported into Great Britain. (Repealed by Statute Law Revision Act 1861 (24 & 25 Vict. c. 101))
Distillation from Corn, etc. Act 1812 (repealed)	52 Geo. 3. c. 118	13 July 1812
An Act to amend an Act made in the present Session of Parliament, intituled "An Act to revive and continue until the Thirty first Day of December One thousand eight hundred and twelve, so much of an Act made in the Forty ninth Year of His present Majesty, to prohibit the Distillation of Spirits from Corn or Grain, in the United Kingdom, as relates to Great Britain; and to revive and continue another Act made in the Forty ninth Year aforesaid, to suspend the Importation of British or Irish-made Spirits into Great Britain or Ireland respectively; and for granting certain Duties on Worts or Wash made from Sugar during the Prohibition of Distillation from Corn or Grain in Great Britain." (Note: Distillation of Spirits Act 1812 (52 Geo. 3. c. 3)) (Repealed by Statute Law Revision Act 1861 (24 & 25 Vict. c. 101))
Importation (No. 3) Act 1812 (repealed)	52 Geo. 3. c. 119	13 July 1812
An Act to repeal so much of an Act of the Forty third Year of His present Majesty, (Note: Importation in Neutral Vessel, etc. Act 1803 (43 Geo. 3. c. 153)) as permits the Importation of Goods and Commodities from Turkey, Egypt or the Levant Seas in Foreign Ships. (Repealed by Statute Law Revision Act 1861 (24 & 25 Vict. c. 101))
Army Act (No. 2) 1812 (repealed)	52 Geo. 3. c. 120	13 July 1812
An Act to explain amend and extend the Provisions of an Act, passed in the last Session of Parliament, (Note: Army Act 1811 (51 Geo. 3. c. 106)) for enabling the Wives and Families of Soldiers to return to their Homes, to the Widows, Wives and Families of Soldiers dying or employed on Foreign Service. (Repealed by Army Act 1832 (2 & 3 Will. 4. c. 97))
Debts of East India Company Act 1812 (repealed)	52 Geo. 3. c. 121	13 July 1812
An Act to authorize the Transfer, to the East Indies, of Debts originally contracted there, on the Part of the East India Company payable in England. (Repealed by Statute Law Revision Act 1873 (36 & 37 Vict. c. 91))
Forces of East India Company Act 1812 (repealed)	52 Geo. 3. c. 122	13 July 1812
An Act to remove Doubts as to an Act passed in the Fiftieth Year of the Reign of His present Majesty, (Note: Courts-Martial on Troops of East India Company Act 1810 (50 Geo. 3. c. 87)) relating to raising Men for the Service of the East India Company. (Repealed by Statute Law Revision Act 1873 (36 & 37 Vict. c. 91))
Duchy of Cornwall Act 1812	52 Geo. 3. c. 123	13 July 1812
An Act for amending and enlarging the Powers of an Act passed in the Fiftieth Year of His Present Majesty, (Note: Cornwall Duchy Act 1810 (50 Geo. 3. c. 6)) to enable his Royal Highness the Prince of Wales to grant Leases of certain Lands and Premises called Prince's Meadows, in the Parish of Lambeth, in the County of Surrey, Parcel of His said Royal Highness's Duchy of Cornwall, for the purpose of building thereon.
Vesting in Crown of Lands at Sandhurst Act 1812 (repealed)	52 Geo. 3. c. 124	13 July 1812
An Act for vesting in His Majesty, his Heirs and Successors, certain Lands or Grounds, formerly Part of the Wastes of the Manor of Sandhurst, in the County of Berks, freed and discharged of Commonable and other Rights. (Repealed by Statute Law (Repeals) Act 1978 (c. 45))
Lotteries (No. 2) Act 1812 (repealed)	52 Geo. 3. c. 125	13 July 1812
An Act for granting to His Majesty a Sum of Money to be raised by Lotteries. (Repealed by Statute Law Revision Act 1873 (36 & 37 Vict. c. 91))
Stamps (Ireland) Act 1812 (repealed)	52 Geo. 3. c. 126	18 July 1812
An Act to repeal the several Acts for the Collection and Management of the Stamp Duties in Ireland, and to make more effectual Regulations for collecting and managing the said Duties. (Repealed by Stamps (Ireland) (No. 4) Act 1815 (55 Geo. 3. c. 81))
Manufacture of Starch from Wheat, etc. Act 1812 (repealed)	52 Geo. 3. c. 127	18 July 1812
An Act to prohibit until the First Day of November One thousand eight hundred and twelve, the making of Starch, Hair Powder and Blue, from Wheat and other Articles of Food; and for suspending Part of the Duties now payable on the Importation into Great Britain of Starch. (Repealed by Statute Law Revision Act 1873 (36 & 37 Vict. c. 91))
Excise (No. 4) Act 1812 (repealed)	52 Geo. 3. c. 128	18 July 1812
An Act for better securing the Duties on Malt. (Repealed by Statute Law Revision Act 1861 (24 & 25 Vict. c. 101))
National Debt Commissioners Act 1812 (repealed)	52 Geo. 3. c. 129	18 July 1812
An Act for amending Two Acts passed in the Forty eighth (Note: Life Annuities Act 1808 (48 Geo. 3. c. 142)) and Forty ninth (Note: Reduction of National Debt Act 1809 (49 Geo. 3. c. 64)) Years of His present Majesty, for enabling the Commissioners for the Reduction of the National Debt to grant Life Annuities. (Repealed by Statute Law Revision Act 1873 (36 & 37 Vict. c. 91))
Malicious Damage Act 1812 (repealed)	52 Geo. 3. c. 130	18 July 1812
An act for the more effectual Punishment of Persons destroying the Properties of His Majesty's Subjects; and enabling the Owners of such Properties to recover Damages for the Injury sustained. (Repealed by Statute Law (Repeals) Act 1973 (c. 39))
Parochial Stipends (Scotland) Act 1812 (repealed)	52 Geo. 3. c. 131	18 July 1812
An Act to exempt from the Duties of One Shilling and of Six pence in the Pound, certain Augmentations made to the Stipends of Parishes in Scotland. (Repealed by Statute Law Revision Act 1950 (14 Geo. 6. c. 6))
Unclaimed Prize Money, etc. Act 1812 (repealed)	52 Geo. 3. c. 132	18 July 1812
An Act for explaining amending and extending the several Laws relative to the Payment of forfeited and unclaimed Shares of Army Prize Money, to the Royal Hospital at Chelsea; and for directing the mode of making up the Accounts of Pensions paid to the Widows of Officers of the Army. (Repealed by Statute Law Revision Act 1873 (36 & 37 Vict. c. 91))
Census (Ireland) Act 1812 (repealed)	52 Geo. 3. c. 133	18 July 1812
An Act for taking an Account of the Population of Ireland, and of the Increase or Diminution thereof. (Repealed by Statute Law Revision Act 1873 (36 & 37 Vict. c. 91))
Butter Trade (Ireland) Act 1812 (repealed)	52 Geo. 3. c. 134	18 July 1812
An Act for the better Regulation of the Butter Trade in Ireland. (Repealed by Marketing of Dairy Produce Act (Northern Ireland) 1929 (20 Geo. 5. c. 14 (N.I.)))
East India Company (No. 2) Act 1812 (repealed)	52 Geo. 3. c. 135	18 July 1812
An Act for advancing Two Millions five hundred thousand Pounds to the East India Company, to enable them to discharge Part of the Indian Debt. (Repealed by Statute Law Revision Act 1861 (24 & 25 Vict. c. 101))
Price of Coals for Poor of Dublin Act 1812 (repealed)	52 Geo. 3. c. 136	18 July 1812
An Act to enable the Lord Lieutenant of Ireland to regulate the Price of Coals to be bought for the Benefit of the Poor of the City of Dublin. (Repealed by Public Coal Yards, Dublin, etc. Act 1821 (1 & 2 Geo. 4. c. 68))
Loans or Exchequer Bills Act 1812 (repealed)	52 Geo. 3. c. 137	20 July 1812
An Act for extending the time for the Payment of certain Sums of Money, advanced by way of Loan under an Act, passed in the last Session of Parliament, (Note: Exchequer Bills (No. 3) Act 1811 (51 Geo. 3. c. 15)) for enabling His Majesty to direct the Issue of Exchequer Bills, to a limited Amount, for the Purposes and in the manner therein mentioned. (Repealed by Statute Law Revision Act 1873 (36 & 37 Vict. c. 91))
Counterfeiting Tokens, etc. Act 1812 (repealed)	52 Geo. 3. c. 138	20 July 1812
An Act for the further Prevention of the counterfeiting of Silver Tokens issued by the Governor and Company of the Bank of England, called Dollars, and of Silver Pieces issued and circulated by the said Governor and Company, called Tokens; and for the further Prevention of Frauds practised by the Imitation of the Notes or Bills of the said Governor and Company. (Repealed by Coinage Act 1870 (33 & 34 Vict. c. 10))
Duties on Stone Bottles Act 1812 (repealed)	52 Geo. 3. c. 139	22 July 1812
An Act for granting to His Majesty certain Duties on Stone Bottles made in or imported into Great Britain. (Repealed by Statute Law Revision Act 1861 (24 & 25 Vict. c. 101))
Exportation (No. 3) Act 1812 (repealed)	52 Geo. 3. c. 140	22 July 1812
An Act to permit the Exportation of certain Articles to the Isle of Man from Great Britain. (Repealed by Customs Law Repeal Act 1825 (6 Geo. 4. c. 105))
Customs Act (No. 5) 1812 (repealed)	52 Geo. 3. c. 141	22 July 1812
An Act to regulate the manner of licensing Boats by the Commissioners of the Customs, and the delivering up of Licenses in Cases of Loss or Capture of Vessels licensed; and for enabling the Commissioners of the Customs to purchase certain Boats at a Valuation. (Repealed by Customs Law Repeal Act 1825 (6 Geo. 4. c. 105))
Removal of Goods Act 1812 (repealed)	52 Geo. 3. c. 142	22 July 1812
An Act to permit the Removal of Goods from one Bonding Warehouse to another, in the same Port. (Repealed by Statute Law Revision Act 1861 (24 & 25 Vict. c. 101))
Land Tax Certificates Forgery Act 1812 (repealed)	52 Geo. 3. c. 143	23 July 1812
An Act for amending and reducing into one Act, the Provisions contained in any Laws now in force imposing the Penalty of Death for any Act done in Breach of or in Resistance to any Part of the Laws for collecting His Majesty's Revenue in Great Britain. (Repealed for England and Wales and Ireland by Forgery Act 1913 (3 & 4 Geo. 5. c. 27) and for Scotland by Statute Law Revision Act 1966 (c. 5))
Members of Parliament (Bankruptcy) Act 1812 (repealed)	52 Geo. 3. c. 144	23 July 1812
An Act to suspend and finally vacate the Seats of Members of the House of Commons, who shall become Bankrupts, and who shall not pay their Debts in full within a limited Time. (Repealed by Statute Law Revision Act 1958 (6 & 7 Eliz. 2. c. 46))
Exemption from Toll Act 1812 (repealed)	52 Geo. 3. c. 145	23 July 1812
An Act to explain the Exemption from Toll in several Acts of Parliament, for Carriages employed in Husbandry; and for regulating the Tolls to be paid on other Carriages, and on Horses, in certain other Cases therein specified. (Repealed by Turnpike Roads Act 1822 (3 Geo. 4. c. 126))
Parochial Registers Act 1812 or Rose’s Act (repealed)	52 Geo. 3. c. 146	28 July 1812
An Act for the better regulating and preserving Parish and other Registers of Births, Baptisms, Marriages and Burials in England. (Repealed by Births and Deaths Registration Act 1836 (6 & 7 Will. 4. c. 86))
Assessed Taxes (No. 2) Act 1812 (repealed)	52 Geo. 3. c. 147	28 July 1812
An Act for regulating the Allowances granted out of the Duties of Assessed Taxes, to Persons in respect of the Number of their Children, by an Act passed in the Forty sixth Year of His present Majesty; (Note: Taxation Act 1806 (46 Geo. 3. c. 84)) and for extending the Limitation mentioned in the said Act in Proportion to the Increase of the said Duties. (Repealed by Assessed Taxes Act 1816 (56 Geo. 3. c. 66))
Sale of Certain Stock Act 1812 (repealed)	52 Geo. 3. c. 148	28 July 1812
An Act to enable the Keeper of His Majesty's Privy Purse for the time being, to dispose of and transfer all such Public Stocks or Funds, as now do or shall hereafter stand in his Name, in the Books of the Governor and Company of the Bank of England, in Trust for His Majesty. (Repealed by Statute Law Revision Act 1873 (36 & 37 Vict. c. 91))
Coffee, etc. Act 1812 (repealed)	52 Geo. 3. c. 149	28 July 1812
An Act to regulate the Separation of damaged from sound Coffee, and to permit Dealers to send out any Quantity of Coffee not exceeding eight Pounds Weight without Permit, until the End of Two Years from the passing of this Act. (Repealed by Statute Law Revision Act 1873 (36 & 37 Vict. c. 91))
Medicines Stamp Act 1812 (repealed)	52 Geo. 3. c. 150	28 July 1812
An Act to amend an Act passed in the Forty fourth Year of His Majesty's Reign, (Note: Stamp Act 1804 (44 Geo. 3. c. 98)) for granting Stamp Duties in Great Britain, so far as regards the Duties granted on Medicines and on Licences for vending the same. (Repealed by Pharmacy and Medicines Act 1941 (4 & 5 Geo. 6. c. 42))
Retirement of Officers on Half Pay Act 1812 (repealed)	52 Geo. 3. c. 151	28 July 1812
An Act to extend the Provisions of an Act of the last Session of Parliament, (Note: Retirement of Officers on Half Pay Act 1811 (51 Geo. 3. c. 103)) relating to the Half Pay and Allowance of Officers retiring from Service; and to authorize the allowing to Foreign Officers wounded, the like Pensions and Allowances as are given to British Officers under the like circumstances. (Repealed by Regulation of the Forces Act 1881 (44 & 45 Vict. c. 57))
Agent General for Volunteers, etc. Act 1812 (repealed)	52 Geo. 3. c. 152	28 July 1812
An Act to repeal an Act, passed in the Forty ninth Year of His present Majesty, intituled "An Act for better regulating the Office of Agent General for Volunteers and Local Militia," (Note: Volunteers and Local Militia Act 1809 (49 Geo. 3. c. 113)) and for the more effectually regulating the said Office. (Repealed by Statute Law Revision Act 1873 (36 & 37 Vict. c. 91))
British White Herring Fishery Act 1812 (repealed)	52 Geo. 3. c. 153	28 July 1812
An Act to rectify a Mistake and to carry into more effectual Execution the Purposes of an Act made in the last Session of Parliament, (Note: British White Herring Fishery Act 1811 (51 Geo. 3. c. 101)) relating to the British White Herring Fishery. (Repealed by Statute Law Revision Act 1861 (24 & 25 Vict. c. 101))
Appropriation Act 1812 (repealed)	52 Geo. 3. c. 154	28 July 1812
An Act for granting to His Majesty certain Sums of Money out of the Consolidated Fund of Great Britain, and for applying certain Monies therein mentioned for the Service of the Year One thousand eight hundred and twelve; and for further appropriating the Supplies granted in this Session of Parliament. (Repealed by Statute Law Revision Act 1873 (36 & 37 Vict. c. 91))
Places of Religious Worship Act 1812 (repealed)	52 Geo. 3. c. 155	29 July 1812
An Act to repeal certain Acts, and amend other Acts relating to Religious Worship and Assemblies and Persons teaching or preaching therein. (Repealed by Statute Law (Repeals) Act 1977 (c. 18))
Prisoners of War (Escape) Act 1812 (repealed)	52 Geo. 3. c. 156	29 July 1812
An act for the more effectual Punishment of Persons aiding Prisoners of War to escape from His Majesty's Dominions. (Repealed by Statute Law (Repeals) Act 1973 (c. 39))
Tokens Act 1812 (repealed)	52 Geo. 3. c. 157	29 July 1812
An Act to prevent the issuing and circulating of Pieces of Gold and Silver, or other Metal, usually called Tokens, except such as are issued by the Banks of England and Ireland respectively. (Repealed by Coinage Act 1870 (33 & 34 Vict. c. 10))
Relief as to Transferable Stocks, etc. Act 1812 (repealed)	52 Geo. 3. c. 158	29 July 1812
An Act to extend the Provisions of an Act passed in the Thirty sixth Year of the Reign of His present Majesty, (Note: Bank of England Stock Act 1796 (36 Geo. 3. c. 90)) for the Relief of Persons equitably entitled to Stocks and Annuities transferrable at the Bank of England, and of an Act passed in this present Session (Note: Infant Suitors in Equity Entitled to Stock Act 1812 (52 Geo. 3. c. 32)) for the Relief of Infant Suitors entitled to the like Stocks and Annuities, to all other transferrable Stocks and Funds. (Repealed by Infants, Lunatics, etc. Act 1825 (6 Geo. 4. c. 74))
Duties, etc., on Foreign Liquors, etc. Act 1812 (repealed)	52 Geo. 3. c. 159	29 July 1812
An Act for charging Foreign Liquors and Tobacco Derelict, Jetsam, Flotsam, Lagan or Wreck, brought or coming into Great Britain, with the Duties payable on Importation of such Liquors and Tobacco. (Repealed by Customs Law Repeal Act 1825 (6 Geo. 4. c. 105))
Relief of Debtors in Prison Act 1812 (repealed)	52 Geo. 3. c. 160	29 July 1812
An Act to enable Justices of the Peace to order parochial Relief to Prisoners confined under Mesne Process for Debt in such Gaols as are not County Gaols. (Repealed by Statute Law Revision Act 1873 (36 & 37 Vict. c. 91))
Duchy of Lancaster Act 1812	52 Geo. 3. c. 161	29 July 1812
An Act for enabling His Majesty to grant Leases under certain Circumstances, and for the better carrying into Effect the Provisions of an Act passed in the Thirty-ninth and Fortieth Year of the Reign of His present Majesty, (Note: New Forest Act 1800 (39 & 40 Geo. 3. c. 86)) touching the Formation of a Map of the New Forest in the County of Southampton, and continuing and extending other Provisions of the said Act; for further appropriating the Monies arisen or to arise from the Sale of certain Crown Lands under the Authority of divers Acts of Parliament; for annexing certain Lands within the Forest of Rockingham to His Majesty's Manor of King's Cliffe; and for enabling the Commissioners of the Treasury to appropriate small Portions of Land for Ecclesiastical Purposes.
Peace Preservation (England) Act 1812 (repealed)	52 Geo. 3. c. 162	29 July 1812
An Act for the Preservation of the public Peace in certain disturbed Counties in England; and to give, until the Twenty fifth Day of March One thousand eight hundred and thirteen, additional Powers to Justices for that Purpose. (Repealed by Statute Law Revision Act 1873 (36 & 37 Vict. c. 91))
Insolvent Debtors Relief (Ireland) (No. 3) Act 1812 (repealed)	52 Geo. 3. c. 163	29 July 1812
An Act for the Relief of certain Insolvent Debtors in Ireland. (Repealed by Statute Law Revision Act 1873 (36 & 37 Vict. c. 91))
Exchequer Bills (No. 5) Act 1812 (repealed)	52 Geo. 3. c. 164	29 July 1812
An Act for enabling His Majesty to raise the Sum of Three Millions for the Service of Great Britain, and for applying the Sum of Two hundred thousand Pounds British Currency for the Service of Ireland. (Repealed by Statute Law Revision Act 1873 (36 & 37 Vict. c. 91))
Insolvent Debtors Relief (England) (No. 2) Act 1812 (repealed)	52 Geo. 3. c. 165	30 July 1812
An Act for the Relief of certain Insolvent Debtors in England. (Repealed by Statute Law Revision Act 1873 (36 & 37 Vict. c. 91))

=== Local acts ===
Short title	Citation	Royal assent
Long title
Steeple cum Stansgate and St. Lawrence Drainage Act 1812	52 Geo. 3. c. i	28 February 1812
An Act for embanking and draining certain Lands adjoining the River Wade in the Parishes of Steeple cum Stansgate and Saint Lawrence in the County of Essex.
Staffordshire Judges' Lodgings Act 1812 (repealed)	52 Geo. 3. c. ii	28 February 1812
An Act for vesting in the Clerk of the Peace of the County of Stafford, a House for the Accommodation of His Majesty's Judges at the Assizes, and for maintaining and supporting the same; and for amending an Act of His present Majesty (Note: Stafford Shire Hall Act 1794 (34 Geo. 3. c. 97)) for building a new Shire Hall for the said County. (Repealed by Staffordshire Act 1983 (c. xviii))
Norwich and Watton Road Act 1812 (repealed)	52 Geo. 3. c. iii	28 February 1812
An Act to continue and amend Two Acts of the Tenth (Note: Norwich and Watton Road Act 1770 (10 Geo. 3. c. 77)) and Thirtieth (Note: Norwich and Watton Road Act 1790 (30 Geo. 3. c. 104)) Years of His present Majesty for amending and widening the Road from Saint Stephen's Gate, in the County of the City of Norwich, to the Windmill in the Town of Watton, in the County of Norfolk. (Repealed by Norwich and Watton Road Act 1833 (3 & 4 Will. 4. c. xv))
Roborough Down and Dartmoor Road Act 1812	52 Geo. 3. c. iv	28 February 1812
An Act for repairing the Road from Roborough Down to the Tavistock Road near Dart Moor Prison of War, (Note: HM Prison Dartmoor.) and to Two Bridges, in the County of Devon.
Siddal Moor Inclosure Act 1812	52 Geo. 3. c. v	28 February 1812
An Act for inclosing Siddal Moor, situate within the Township of Hopwood, in the Parish of Middleton, in the County Palatine of Lancaster.
Great Crosby Marsh Inclosure Act 1812	52 Geo. 3. c. vi	28 February 1812
An Act for inclosing Great Crosby Marsh, in the Manor of Great Crosby, and Parish of Sephton, in the County of Lancaster.
Alfreton and Mansfield Road Act 1812	52 Geo. 3. c. vii	5 March 1812
An Act for continuing the Term and altering and enlarging the Powers of Two Acts of His present Majesty, (Note: Derby and Nottinghamshire Roads Act 1764 (4 Geo. 3. c. 67)) (Note: Derby Nottinghamshire Roads Act 1790 (30 Geo. 3. c. 113)) for repairing the Road from Alfreton to Mansfield, in the Counties of Derby and Nottingham, and other Roads therein mentioned.
Old Street and other Middlesex Roads Act 1812 (repealed)	52 Geo. 3. c. viii	5 March 1812
An Act for enlarging the Term and Powers of Two Acts of King George the Second, (Note: Old Street Road Act 1753 (26 Geo. 2. c. 87)) (Note: Old Street Road Act 1756 (29 Geo. 2. c. 44)) and Two Acts of His present Majesty, (Note: Old Street Road Act 1772 (12 Geo. 3. c. 99)) (Note: Old Street Road Act 1789 (29 Geo. 3. c. 82)) for repairing and widening Old Street Road, and other Roads therein mentioned, in the County of Middlesex. (Repealed by Metropolis Roads Act 1826 (7 Geo. 4. c. cxlii))
Erith Inclosure Act 1812	52 Geo. 3. c. ix	5 March 1812
An Act for inclosing Lands in the Parish of Erith, in the County of Kent.
Deopham Inclosure Act 1812	52 Geo. 3. c. x	5 March 1812
An Act for inclosing Lands in the Parish of Deepham, in the County of Norfolk.
Liversedge Chapel of Ease Act 1812	52 Geo. 3. c. xi	20 March 1812
An Act for building a Church or Chapel of Ease in Liversedge, in the Parish of Birstall, in the West Riding of the County of York.
Wangford (Suffolk) Poor Relief Act 1812 (repealed)	52 Geo. 3. c. xii	20 March 1812
An Act for altering and enlarging the Powers of an Act of His present Majesty, (Note: Wangford, Suffolk (Poor Relief) Act 1764 (4 Geo. 3. c. 91)) for the better Relief and Employment of the Poor in the Hundred of Wangford, in the County of Suffolk. (Repealed by Statute Law (Repeals) Act 2013 (c. 2))
Westsirle, Beddingham and Glynde Poor Relief Act 1812 (repealed)	52 Geo. 3. c. xiii	20 March 1812
An Act for the better Employment and Support of the Poor in the Parishes of Westsirle, Beddingham and Glynde, in the County of Suffex. (Repealed by Statute Law (Repeals) Act 2013 (c. 2))
Southwark Improvement Act 1812 (repealed)	52 Geo. 3. c. xiv	20 March 1812
An Act for better paving, cleansing, lighting and watching the Streets, Lanes and other public Passages and Places, within the Manor of Southwark, otherwise called The Clink, or Bishop of Winchester's Liberty, in the Parish of Saint Saviour, Southwark, in the County of Surrey. (Repealed by London Government (Borough of Southwark) Order in Council 1901 (SR&O 1901/275))
Maryport Harbour Act 1812 (repealed)	52 Geo. 3. c. xv	20 March 1812
An Act for enlarging the Term and Powers of Three Acts of His late and present Majesty, (Note: Maryport Harbour Act 1748 (22 Geo. 2. c. 6)) (Note: Maryport Harbour Act 1756 (29 Geo. 2. c. 57)) (Note: Maryport Harbour Act 1791 (31 Geo. 3. c. 23)) for repairing the Harbour of Maryport in the County of Cumberland. (Repealed by Maryport Harbour and Improvement Act 1833 (3 & 4 Will. 4. c. cxiii))
Grand Western Canal Act 1812	52 Geo. 3. c. xvi	20 March 1812
An Act to alter and increase the Rates of Tonnage, authorized to be taken by the Company of Proprietors of The Grand Western Canal; and to amend the several Acts (Note: Grand Western Canal Act 1796 (36 Geo. 3. c. 46)) (Note: Grand Western Canal Act 1811 (51 Geo. 3. c. clxviii)) passed for making the said Canal.
Hempstead, Happisburgh, Eccles, Palling-next-the-sea, Lessingham, and Ingham Drainage Act 1812	52 Geo. 3. c. xvii	20 March 1812
An Act for allotting the Lands in the Parish of Hempstead, in the County of Norfolk, and for the Drainage of the Marshes or Fen Grounds within the said Parish, and of certain other Marshes, Meadows and Low Grounds, within the several Parishes of Happisburgh, Eccles, Palling next the Sea, Lessingham and Ingham, in the County aforesaid.
Horsey Inclosure and Drainage Act 1812	52 Geo. 3. c. xviii	20 March 1812
An Act for inclosing and draining Lands in the Parish of Horsey, in the County of Norfolk.
Drury Lane Theatre Act 1812	52 Geo. 3. c. xix	20 March 1812
An Act for altering and enlarging the Powers of an Act of His present Majesty, (Note: Drury Lane Theatre Act 1810 (50 Geo. 3. c. ccxiv)) for rebuilding the late Theatre Royal Drury Lane.
Lucan Bridge, Dublin Act 1812	52 Geo. 3. c. xx	20 March 1812
An Act to enable the Grand Jury of the County of Dublin to raise a sufficient Sum of Money, by Presentment, for completing the rebuilding Lucan Bridge over the River Anna Liffey at Lucan in the Parish of Lucan, in the County of Dublin.
Hedon and Hull Road Act 1812 (repealed)	52 Geo. 3. c. xxi	20 March 1812
An Act for enlarging the Term and Powers of an Act of King George the Second, (Note: Hedon and Hull Road Act 1744 (18 Geo. 2. c. 6)) and Two Acts of His present Majesty, (Note: Hedon and Hull Road Act 1766 (7 Geo. 3. c. 71)) (Note: Hedon and Hull Road Act 1793 (33 Geo. 3. c. 157)) for repairing the Road from Hedon to Hull, and other Roads therein mentioned, in the County of York. (Repealed by Hendon and Hull and Wyton and Flinton Turnpike Roads Act 1855 (18 & 19 Vict. c. cxxxvi))
Kingston-upon-Hull and Beverley Road Act 1812 (repealed)	52 Geo. 3. c. xxii	20 March 1812
An Act for enlarging the Term and Powers of an Act of King George the Second, (Note: Kingston-upon-Hull and Beverley Road Act 1743 (17 Geo. 2. c. 25)) and Two Acts of His present Majesty, (Note: Kingston-upon-Hull and Beverley Road Act 1764 (4 Geo. 3. c. 66)) (Note: Kingston-upon-Hull and Beverley Road Act 1792 (32 Geo. 3. c. 136)) for repairing the Roads from Hull to Beverley, and from Newland Bridge to Cottingham, in the County of York. (Repealed by Kingston-upon-Hull and Beverley, and Newland Bridge and Cottingham Roads (Yorkshire, East Riding) Act 1833 (3 & 4 Will. 4. c. xciii))
Ipswich and Debenham, and Hemingston and Otley Bottom Roads Act 1812 (repealed)	52 Geo. 3. c. xxiii	20 March 1812
An Act for repairing the Roads from Ipswich to Helmingham, and to Debenham, and from Hemingston to Otley Bottom, in the County of Suffolk. (Repealed by Ipswich and Debenham, and Hemingston and Otley Bottom Roads Act 1833 (3 & 4 Will. 4. c. x))
Road from Ipswich to Stratford St. Mary Act 1812 (repealed)	52 Geo. 3. c. xxiv	20 March 1812
An Act for repairing the Road from Ipswich to Stratford Saint Mary, in the County of Suffolk. (Repealed by Road from Ipswich to Stratford St. Mary Act 1832 (2 & 3 Will. 4. c. v))
Tamworth Roads Act 1812 (repealed)	52 Geo. 3. c. xxv	20 March 1812
An Act for enlarging the Term and Powers of Two Acts of His present Majesty, (Note: Tamworth Roads Act 1770 (10 Geo. 3. c. 99)) (Note: Tamworth Roads Act 1782 (22 Geo. 3. c. 99)) for repairing several Roads leading to and through the Borough of Tamworth, and other Roads therein mentioned, in the Counties of Stafford, Warwick and Derby, and in the County of the City of Lichfield. (Repealed by Tamworth Roads Act 1832 (2 & 3 Will. 4. c. li))
Road from Ockley to Warnham Act 1812 (repealed)	52 Geo. 3. c. xxvi	20 March 1812
An Act for making and maintaining a Road from Stone Street Hatch at Ockley, in the County of Surrey, to join a Branch of the Horsham and Guildford Road at Warnham, in the County of Sussex. (Repealed by Ockley and Warnham Road Act 1833 (3 & 4 Will. 4. c. liii))
Cirencester Road Act 1812 (repealed)	52 Geo. 3. c. xxvii	20 March 1812
An Act to continue the Term and alter and enlarge the Powers of an Act passed in the Twenty third Year of His present Majesty, (Note: Gloucestershire Roads Act 1783 (23 Geo. 3. c. 106)) for completing the Road from Cirencester, in the County of Gloucester, through Tetbury to Woefield Corner, and a Road from thence to or near Lambridge, near the City of Bath, and for other Purposes relating thereto; and also to repair a certain Road from Duffton to Underbridge, in the Parish of Shipton Moigne, in the said County. (Repealed by Statute Law (Repeals) Act 2013 (c. 2))
St. Asaph and Conway Roads Act 1812 (repealed)	52 Geo. 3. c. xxviii	20 March 1812
An Act for enlarging the Term and Powers of Two Acts of His present Majesty, (Note: Flint Roads Act 1769 (9 Geo. 3. c. 45)) (Note: Flint Roads Act 1771 (11 Geo. 3. c. 69)) for repairing Roads in the Counties of Flint, Denbigh and Carnarvon, so far as the same relate to The Saint Asaph and Conway Districts of Road. (Repealed by Road from Pant Evan Brook to Abergele Act 1833 (3 & 4 Will. 4. c. xxvi))
Macclesfield and Chapel-en-le-Frith Road Act 1812 (repealed)	52 Geo. 3. c. xxix	20 March 1812
An Act to continue and amend Two Acts passed in the Tenth (Note: Chester and Derby Roads Act 1770 (10 Geo. 3. c. 98)) and Thirtieth (Note: Chester and Derby Roads Act 1790 (30 Geo. 3. c. 88)) Years of His present Majesty, for repairing the Road from Macclesfield, in the County of Chester, to the Turnpike Road at Randle Carr Lane Head, in Fernilee, in the County of Derby, leading to Chapel in the Frith in the same County. (Repealed by Hurdsfield and Chapel-en-le-Frith Road (Derbyshire) Act 1833 (3 & 4 Will. 4. c. lix))
Roads from Wendover and from the River Colne Act 1812 (repealed)	52 Geo. 3. c. xxx	20 March 1812
An Act for more effectually repairing the Roads from Wendover to the End of Oak Lane, and from the River Colne, for Half a Mile towards Beaconsfield, in the County of Bucks. (Repealed by Wendover and Oak Lane, and River Colne and Beaconsfield Roads Act 1833 (3 & 4 Will. 4. c. xii))
Chesterfield to Hernstone Lane Head Turnpike Roads Act 1812 (repealed)	52 Geo. 3. c. xxxi	20 March 1812
An Act for enlarging the Term and Powers of an Act of King George the Second, (Note: Derbyshire Roads Act 1758 (32 Geo. 2. c. 42)) and Two Acts of His present Majesty, (Note: Derbyshire Roads Act 1779 (19 Geo. 3. c. 87)) (Note: Chesterfield and Hernstone Lane Head Turnpike Roads Act 1801 (41 Geo. 3. (U.K.) c. ii)) for repairing the Roads from Chesterfield to Hernstone Lane Head, with its Branches; and for amending and making a certain other Road to communicate therewith, all in the County of Derby. (Repealed by Chesterfield and Hernstone Lane Head Turnpike Roads Act 1864 (27 & 28 Vict. c. lxxiv))
Congham Inclosure Act 1812	52 Geo. 3. c. xxxii	20 March 1812
An Act for inclosing Lands in Congham, in the County of Norfolk.
Barford Inclosure Act 1812	52 Geo. 3. c. xxxiii	20 March 1812
An Act for inclosing Lands in the Parish of Barford, in the County of Norfolk.
Caister next Great Yarmouth Inclosure Act 1812	52 Geo. 3. c. xxxiv	20 March 1812
An Act for inclosing Lands in the Parish of Caister, next Great Yarmouth, in the County of Norfolk.
East Dereham Inclosure Act 1812	52 Geo. 3. c. xxxv	20 March 1812
An Act for inclosing Lands in the Parish of East Dereham, in the County of Norfolk.
Kirby Bedon Inclosure Act 1812	52 Geo. 3. c. xxxvi	20 March 1812
An Act for inclosing Lands in the Parish of Kirby Bedon, in the County of Norfolk.
Strood Workhouse, Poor and Church Act 1812 (repealed)	52 Geo. 3. c. xxxvii	25 March 1812
An Act for enlarging the present or providing a new Workhouse for the Use of the Parish of Strood, in the County of Kent; for better governing, maintaining and employing the Poor of the said Parish; and also for repairing or rebuilding the Church and Tower of the same Parish, and for other Purposes relating thereto. (Repealed by County of Kent Act 1981 (c. xviii))
Boroughbridge and Durham Road Act 1812 (repealed)	52 Geo. 3. c. xxxviii	25 March 1812
An Act for more effectually repairing the Road from Boroughbridge, in the County of York, to the City of Durham. (Repealed by Boroughbridge and Durham Road Act 1832 (2 & 3 Will. 4. c. xxii))
Road from Brough Ferry and from Brough to Welton Act 1812 (repealed)	52 Geo. 3. c. xxxix	25 March 1812
An Act for enlarging the Term and Powers of Two Acts of His present Majesty, (Note: Yorkshire Roads (No. 3) Act 1771 (11 Geo. 3. c. 71)) (Note: Yorkshire Roads (No. 2) Act 1792 (32 Geo. 3. c. 133)) for repairing the Road from Brough Ferry to South Newbald Holmes, (Note: South Newbald, Yorkshire.) in the East Riding of the County of York, and for amending the Road from Brough (Note: Brough, Yorkshire.) to Welton, in the same Riding. (Repealed by Road from Brough Ferry and from Brough to Welton Act 1832 (2 & 3 Will. 4. c. xv))
Roads in Cardigan Act 1812 (repealed)	52 Geo. 3. c. xl	25 March 1812
An Act for enlarging the Term and Powers of Two several Acts of His present Majesty, (Note: Cardigan Roads Act 1770 (10 Geo. 3. c. 55)) (Note: Cardigan Roads Act 1791 (31 Geo. 3. c. 97)) for repairing and widening several Roads in the County of Cardigan; and also for making other Roads in the said County. (Repealed by Roads in Cardiganshire Act 1833 (3 & 4 Will. 4. c. xxxvii))
Road from Haverfordwest through Fishguard Act 1812 (repealed)	52 Geo. 3. c. xli	25 March 1812
An Act for continuing the Term and altering the Powers of an Act made in the Thirty first Year of His present Majesty, (Note: Fishguard Roads Act 1791 (31 Geo. 3. c. 106)) for repairing the Roads leading from Haverfordwest, through Fishguard, to Newport, in the County of Pembroke, and from Fishguard to the City of Saint David's, in the said County. (Repealed by Turnpike Trusts in South Wales Act 1844 (7 & 8 Vict. c. 91))
Llanvihangel Nantmellan Inclosure Act 1812	52 Geo. 3. c. xlii	25 March 1812
An Act for inclosing Lands in the Township of Llanvihangel Nantmellan, in the County of Radnor.
Caston Inclosure Act 1812	52 Geo. 3. c. xliii	25 March 1812
An Act for inclosing Lands in the Parish of Caston, in the County of Norfolk.
Pilleth Inclosure Act 1812	52 Geo. 3. c. xliv	25 March 1812
An Act for inclosing Lands in the Parish of Pilleth, in the County of Radnor.
Southweald Inclosure Act 1812	52 Geo. 3. c. xlv	25 March 1812
An Act for inclosing Lands within the Manor and Parish of Southweald, in the County of Essex.
Thames Navigation Act 1812 (repealed)	52 Geo. 3. c. xlvi	20 April 1812
An Act for altering amending and enlarging the Powers Three Acts of His present Majesty, (Note: Thames Navigation Act 1774 (14 Geo. 3. c. 91)) (Note: Thames Navigation Act 1776 (17 Geo. 3. c. 18)) (Note: Thames (West of London Bridge) Navigation Act 1810 (50 Geo. 3. c. cciv)) for improving the Navigation of the River Thames, Westward of London Bridge, within the Liberties of the City of London; and for further improving the said Navigation. (Repealed by Thames Conservancy Act 1894 (57 & 58 Vict. c. clxxxvii))
Thames Navigation (Milson's Point and Bell Weir Canal) Act 1812 (repealed)	52 Geo. 3. c. xlvii	20 April 1812
An Act to authorize the Commissioners for improving and completing the Navigation of the Rivers Thames and Isis, from the Jurisdiction of the City of London, near Staines, in the County of Middlesex, to the Town of Cricklade, in the County of Wilts, to make a navigable Canal out of the River Thames near Milson's Point, in the Parish of Egham, in the County of Surrey, to communicate with the said River at or near Bell Weir, in the said Parish of Egham; and to erect Pound Locks in such Cut, with necessary Weirs and other Works on the said Navigation. (Repealed by Thames Conservancy Act 1894 (57 & 58 Vict. c. clxxxvii))
Westminster and Middlesex Commissioners of Sewers Act 1812	52 Geo. 3. c. xlviii	20 April 1812
An Act for empowering the Commissioners of Sewers for the City and Liberty of Westminster, and Part of the County of Middlesex, to purchase a Messuage and Premises for holding their Meetings; and for enlarging the Powers of the said Commissioners.
Cupar Gaol Act 1812	52 Geo. 3. c. xlix	20 April 1812
An Act for erecting a new Gaol in or near the Burgh of Cupar, in the County of Fife, and for other Purposes relating thereto.
Cattewater Harbour Act 1812	52 Geo. 3. c. l	20 April 1812
An Act for the Improvement of certain Parts of the Harbour of Catwater within the Manor of Plympton in the County of Devon; and for the more effectually providing for the Security of the Communication from Pamphlet Point across the contiguous Water of Lary within the said Manor.
Guildford Improvement Act 1812 (repealed)	52 Geo. 3. c. li	20 April 1812
An Act for paving, cleansing and otherwise improving the Town of Guildford, in the County of Surrey. (Repealed by Local Government Supplemental Act 1865 (No. 5) (28 & 29 Vict. c. 108))
Cranston Hill Waterworks Act 1812	52 Geo. 3. c. lii	20 April 1812
An Act to enable the Company of Proprietors of the Cranston Hill Water Works to raise more Money for the further Supply of the City and Suburbs of Glasgow, and Places adjacent, with Water.
Dublin Port Improvement and Ormond Bridge Replacement Act 1812	52 Geo. 3. c. liii	20 April 1812
An Act for empowering the Grand Juries for the County of the City of Dublin and of the County of Dublin, and the Corporation, to preserve and improve the Port of Dublin, to vary the Scite heretofore fixed for the intended Bridge over the River Anna Liffey, in the said City (in place of Ormond Bridge) from a Spot opposite the Four Courts, to a Spot opposite Charles Street or Mass Lane, in the said City and for other Purposes relating thereto.
Court of Chancery Clerks Act 1812 (repealed)	52 Geo. 3. c. liv	20 April 1812
An Act for making further Provision for the Clerks in the Office of the Accountant General of the Court of Chancery, after a certain Length of Service. (Repealed by Court of Chancery (Funds) Act 1872 (35 & 36 Vict. c. 44))
Roads, Bridges and Statute Labour in Renfrewshire Act 1812	52 Geo. 3. c. lv	20 April 1812
An Act for enlarging the Terms and Powers of several Acts (Note: Ayr Roads Act 1757 (30 Geo. 2. c. 57)) (Note: Renfrew Roads and Bridges Act 1792 (32 Geo. 3. c. 68)) (Note: Ayr Roads Act 1792 (32 Geo. 3. c. 121)) (Note: Greenock to Kelly Bridge Road Act 1803 (43 Geo. 3. c. xcvi)) (Note: Renfrew, Lanark and Ayr Turnpike Roads Act 1804 (44 Geo. 3. c. lii)) (Note: Road from Renfrew to Greenock and from Kilbarchan to Inchinnan Bridge Act 1806 (46 Geo. 3. c. lxxi)) for making and repairing certain Roads in the County of Renfrew, building a Bridge or Bridges at Inchinnan, and regulating the Statute Labour of the said County, and for other Purposes relative thereto.
Roads from Warminster and from Frome and from Wolverton Act 1812 (repealed)	52 Geo. 3. c. lvi	20 April 1812
An Act for repairing the Roads from Warminster, and from Frome, to the Bath Road; and from Woolverton to the Trowbridge Road, in the Counties of Wilts and Somerset. (Repealed by Roads from Warminster and from Frome and from Woolverton Act 1833 (3 & 4 Will. 4. c. lxxviii))
Roads through Coventry Act 1812 (repealed)	52 Geo. 3. c. lvii	20 April 1812
An Act for improving the Public Roads in and through the City of Coventry. (Repealed by Statute Law (Repeals) Act 2013 (c. 2))
Norwich and New Buckenham Road Act 1812 (repealed)	52 Geo. 3. c. lviii	20 April 1812
An Act to continue and amend Two Acts of His present Majesty, (Note: Norwich to New Buckenham Road Act 1772 (12 Geo. 3. c. 95)) (Note: Norwich to New Buckenham Road Act 1790 (30 Geo. 3. c. 87)) for repairing the Road from Berstreet Gates, (Note: Berstrete Gate, Ber Street, Norwich. The gate was demolished in 1808. 52°37′16″N 1°18′04″E) in the City of Norwich, to New Buckenham, (Note: New Buckenham, Norfolk.) in the County of Norfolk. (Repealed by Norwich and New Buckenham Road Act 1833 (3 & 4 Will. 4. c. xxxix))
Oldham to Ripponden Road Act 1812 (repealed)	52 Geo. 3. c. lix	20 April 1812
An Act for amending the Roads from Oldham, in the County of Lancaster, to Ripponden, in the County of York; and from Denshaw to Brownhill, and from Grains to Delph, all within Saddleworth, in the said County of York. (Repealed by Road from Oldham to Ripponden (Yorkshire) Act 1829 (10 Geo. 4. c. lxxxix))
Wellesbourne Mountfort and Stratford-upon-Avon Road Act 1812 (repealed)	52 Geo. 3. c. lx	20 April 1812
An Act for enlarging the Term and Powers of Two Acts of His present Majesty, (Note: Wellesbourne Mountfort and Stratford-upon-Avon Road Act 1770 (10 Geo. 3. c. 94)) (Note: Wellesbourne Mountfort and Stratford-upon-Avon Road Act 1791 (31 Geo. 3. c. 98)) for amending the Road from Wellbourn Mountfort, to Stratford upon Avon, in the County of Warwick. (Repealed by Wellesbourne Mountford and Stratford-upon-Avon Road Act 1833 (3 & 4 Will. 4. c. xvi))
Upton, Great Kington and Wellesbourne Hastings Road Act 1812 (repealed)	52 Geo. 3. c. lxi	20 April 1812
An Act for enlarging the Term and Powers of Two Acts of His present Majesty, (Note: Upton, Great Kington and Wellesbourne Hastings Road Act 1770 (10 Geo. 3. c. 63)) (Note: Upton, Great Kington and Wellesbourne Hastings Road Act 1792 (32 Geo. 3. c. 116)) for repairing the Road from Upton in Ratley to Great Kington and Wellesbourne Hastings, in the County of Warwick. (Repealed by Upton, Great Kington and Wellesbourne Hastings Road (Warwickshire) Act 1833 (3 & 4 Will. 4. c. xli))
Maidenhead and Reading Road Act 1812	52 Geo. 3. c. lxii	20 April 1812
An Act for enlarging the Powers of an Act of His present Majesty, (Note: Roads from Maidenhead Bridge to Reading and to Henley Bridge Act 1806 (46 Geo. 3. c. cxlv)) for repairing the Roads from Maidenhead Bridge to Reading, and to Henley Bridge (Note: Henley Bridge in Henley-on-Thames. 51°32′15″N 0°54′01″W) in the County of Berks, so far as relates to the Second District of the said Roads.
Ovingham, Bywell St. Peter and Bywell St. Andrew Inclosures Act 1812	52 Geo. 3. c. lxiii	20 April 1812
An Act for inclosing Lands in the Parishes of Ovingham, Bywcil Saint Peter and Bywell Saint Andrew, in the County of Northumberland.
Disserth and Llanelweth Inclosures Act 1812	52 Geo. 3. c. lxiv	20 April 1812
An Act for inclosing Lands in the Parishes of Disserth and Llanelweth, in the County of Radnor.
Thornthwaite Inclosure Act 1812	52 Geo. 3. c. lxv	20 April 1812
An Act for inclosing Lands in Thornthwaite, in the Parish of Crosthwaite, and County of Cumberland.
Great or West Shefford Inclosure Act 1812	52 Geo. 3. c. lxvi	20 April 1812
An Act for inclosing Lands within the Manor and Parish of Great Shefford otherwise West Shefford, in the County of Berks.
Crayford Inclosure Act 1812	52 Geo. 3. c. lxvii	20 April 1812
An Act for inclosing Lands in the Parish of Crayford, in the County of Kent.
Rockland St. Andrew, Rockland All Saints and Rockland St. Peter Inclosures Act 1812	52 Geo. 3. c. lxviii	20 April 1812
An Act for inclosing Lands in the Parishes of Rockland Saint Andrew, Rockland All Saints and Rockland Saint Peter, in the County of Norfolk.
North Walsham and Dilham Canal Navigation Act 1812	52 Geo. 3. c. lxix	5 May 1812
An Act for making a Navigable Canal from the Rivers Ant and Bure, at or near Wayford Bridge, near Dilham, to the Towns of North Walham and Antingham, in the County of Norfolk.
Weald of Kent Canal Act 1812	52 Geo. 3. c. lxx	5 May 1812
An Act for making and maintaining a Navigable Canal from the River Medway, near Brandbridges in the Parish of East Peckham in the County of Kent, to extend to and unite with the Royal Military Canal in the Parish of Appledore in the said County; and also certain Navigable Branches and Railways from the said intended Canal.
Chapel of St. John the Evangelist, Chichester Act 1812	52 Geo. 3. c. lxxi	5 May 1812
An Act for building a Chapel in the City of Chichester, in the County of Sussex.
Oxford Improvement Act 1812 (repealed)	52 Geo. 3. c. lxxii	5 May 1812
An Act for enlarging the Term and Powers of Two Acts of His present Majesty, (Note: Oxford Improvement Act 1771 (11 Geo. 3. c. 19)) (Note: Oxford Improvement Act 1781 (21 Geo. 3. c. 47)) for amending certain Mileways leading to Oxford, and making Improvements in the University and City of Oxford, the Suburbs thereof, and adjoining Parish of Saint Clement, and for other Purposes. (Repealed by Local Government Board's Provisional Orders Confirmation Act 1889 (52 & 53 Vict. c. xv))
Deal Improvement Act 1812 (repealed)	52 Geo. 3. c. lxxiii	5 May 1812
An Act for more effectually paving, cleansing, lighting and watching the Highways, Streets and Lanes within the Town and Borough of Deal, in the County of Kent, and for removing and preventing Encroachments, Nuisances and Annoyances therein. (Repealed by County of Kent Act 1981 (c. xviii))
St. Pancras Improvement Act 1812 (repealed)	52 Geo. 3. c. lxxiv	5 May 1812
An Act for altering and enlarging the Powers of Two Acts of His present Majesty, (Note: Saint Pancras Improvement Act 1772 (12 Geo. 3. c. 69)) (Note: Saint Pancras Improvement Act 1791 (31 Geo. 3. c. 18)) for paving repairing, cleansing lighting, watering and watching such Part of the Parish of Saint Pancras, in the County of Middlesex, as lies on the West Side of Tottenham Court Road. (Repealed by London Government (Borough of St. Pancras) Order in Council 1901 (SR&O 1901/274))
Wapping Rates and Improvement Act 1812 (repealed)	52 Geo. 3. c. lxxv	5 May 1812
An Act for amending and rendering more effectual several Acts (Note: Parish of St. John of Wapping Act 1694 (5 & 6 Will. & Mar. c. 20 Pr.)) (Note: Tower of London Act 1756 (29 Geo. 2. c. 87)) (Note: Saint John, Wapping (Improvement) Act 1771 (11 Geo. 3. c. 21)) (Note: Wapping, Stepney (Poor Relief) Act 1782 (22 Geo. 3. c. 35)) (Note: Wapping, Stepney (Improvement) Act 1782 (22 Geo. 3. c. 86)) (Note: Wapping, Stepney Poor Relief, etc. Act 1783 (23 Geo. 3. c. 32)) for better assessing and collecting the Poor and other Rates of the Parish of Saint John of Wapping, in the County of Middlesex; and for more effectually paving, widening and improving the Streets and other Places within and adjoining to the said Parish. (Repealed by London Government (Borough of Stepney) Order in Council 1901 (SR&O 1901/276))
Newcastle-upon-Tyne Lighting and Watching Act 1812 (repealed)	52 Geo. 3. c. lxxvi	5 May 1812
An Act for lighting and watching the Streets and other Places without the Walls, but within the Liberties, of Newcastle upon Tyne. (Repealed by Newcastle-upon-Tyne Improvement Act 1837 (7 Will. 4 & 1 Vict. c. lxxii))
Newcastle-under-Lyme Coal Supply Act 1812	52 Geo. 3. c. lxxvii	5 May 1812
An Act for better supplying with Coal the Town of Newcastle under Lyme, in the County of Stafford.
Portsmouth and Isle of Wight Watermen Act 1812	52 Geo. 3. c. lxxviii	5 May 1812
An Act to amend an Act made in the Forty ninth Year of His present Majesty, (Note: Portsmouth and Isle of Wight Watermen Act 1809 (49 Geo. 3. c. cxc)) for the better Government of the Watermen working on the Passage between Gosport, Portsmouth and Portsea, and other Places within Portsmouth Harbour, and to and from Spithead, Saint Helens, and other Parts within the Isle of Wight, in the County of Southampton, and to and from certain Places in the said Island, and for regulating the Fares of such Watermen.
Roads, Bridges and Ferries in Perthshire Act 1812	52 Geo. 3. c. lxxix	5 May 1812
An Act for amending Two Acts passed in the Fifty first Year of His present Majesty, (Note: Statute Labour, Roads, Bridges and Ferries in Perthshire Act 1811 (51 Geo. 3. c. cxcvii)) (Note: Roads and Bridges in Perthshire Act 1811 (51 Geo. 3. c. cxcviii)) for more effectually repairing and maintaining certain Roads and Bridges in the County of Perth; and for regulating and converting the Statute Services in the said County, and more effectually making and regulating the Highways, Bridges and Ferries within the same.
Stratford-upon-Avon Bridge Act 1812 (repealed)	52 Geo. 3. c. lxxx	5 May 1812
An Act for taking down and rebuilding certain Parts of the Bridge over the River Avon, at or near Stratford upon Avon, in the County of Warwick, and for widening the same Bridge, and improving the Approaches thereto. (Repealed by Stratford-upon-Avon Bridge Act 1826 (7 Geo. 4. c. iv))
Chatham and Canterbury Road Act 1812	52 Geo. 3. c. lxxxi	5 May 1812
An Act for repairing the Road from Chatham to Canterbury, in the County of Kent.
Rugby Bridge and Hinckley Road Act 1812 (repealed)	52 Geo. 3. c. lxxxii	5 May 1812
An Act for repairing and widening the Road from Rugby Bridge, in the County of Warwick, to the Town of Hinckley, in the County of Leicester. (Repealed by Rugby Bridge and Hinckley Road Act 1833 (3 & 4 Will. 4. c. lxxxvii))
Swindon, Calne and Cricklade Roads Act 1812 (repealed)	52 Geo. 3. c. lxxxiii	5 May 1812
An Act for continuing the Term and amending the Powers of an Act made in the Thirty first Year of His present Majesty, (Note: Swindon, Calne and Cricklade Roads Act 1791 (31 Geo. 3. c. 121)) for repairing the Roads leading from Swindon to the Centre of Christian Malford Bridge, and from Calne to Lyneham Green, and from the Direction Post in Long Leaze Lane, near Lydiard Marsh, to Cricklade, in the County of Wilts. (Repealed by Swindon, Calne and Cricklade Roads Act 1833 (3 & 4 Will. 4. c. xcii))
Roads from Butterton Moor End, from Blaxton Moor and from Warslow Act 1812 (repealed)	52 Geo. 3. c. lxxxiv	5 May 1812
An Act for repairing the Roads from Butterton Moor End to the Turnpike Road from Buxton to Asbborne; from Blacton Moor to the same Turnpike Road near Newhaven; and from Warslow to Ecton Mine, in the Counties of Stafford and Derby. (Repealed by Butterton Moor End and Buxton and Ashbourne Turnpike Road Act 1833 (3 & 4 Will. 4. c. xcvii))
Denbigh and Holywell Roads Act 1812 (repealed)	52 Geo. 3. c. lxxxv	5 May 1812
An Act for enlarging the Term and Powers of an Act of His present Majesty, (Note: Denbigh and Flint Roads Act 1790 (30 Geo. 3. c. 110)) for repairing the Roads from Denbigh to the Northop and Holywell Road, and from Afon Wen to Mold, in the Counties of Denbigh and Flint; and for extending the Powers of the said Act to an adjoining Branch of Road. (Repealed by Denbigh and Mold Road and Branch Act 1833 (3 & 4 Will. 4. c. xxvii))
Darley Moor and Ellaston Road Act 1812 (repealed)	52 Geo. 3. c. lxxxvi	5 May 1812
An Act to continue and amend Two Acts of the Ninth (Note: Darley Moor and Ellaston Road Act 1769 (9 Geo. 3. c. 81)) and Thirty first (Note: Darley Moor and Ellaston Road Act 1791 (31 Geo. 3. c. 123)) Years of His present Majesty, for repairing the Road from Darly Moor, (Note: Darley Moor, on the A515 road, south of Ashbourne, Derbyshire. 52°58′10″N 1°45′11″W) in the County of Derby, to Ellaston, (Note: Ellastone, Staffordshire.) in the County of Stafford, and from thence to the Turnpike Road (Note: The A523 road between Leek, Staffordshire, and Ashbourne, Derbyshire. 53°03′55″N 1°55′15″W) between Leek and Ashborne, in the said Counties of Derby and Stafford. (Repealed by Darly Moor and Ellaston Road (Derbyshire) Act 1833 (3 & 4 Will. 4. c. vii))
Haverfordwest and St. David's Road Act 1812 (repealed)	52 Geo. 3. c. lxxxvii	5 May 1812
An Act for continuing the Term, and altering the Powers of an Act made in the Thirty first Year of His present Majesty, (Note: Haverfordwest and St. David's Road Act 1791 (31 Geo. 3. c. 126)) for repairing the Roads leading from Haverfordwest, to the City of Saint David's, and from the said City to Caerfai, in the County of Pembroke. (Repealed by Turnpike Trusts in South Wales Act 1844 (7 & 8 Vict. c. 91))
Tunstall and Bosley, and Great Chell and Shelton Roads Act 1812 (repealed)	52 Geo. 3. c. lxxxviii	5 May 1812
An Act for enlarging the Term and Powers of Two Acts of His present Majesty, (Note: Stafford and Cheshire Roads Act 1770 (10 Geo. 3. c. 66)) (Note: Stafford and Chester Roads Act 1790 (30 Geo. 3. c. 112)) for repairing several Roads to and from Tunstall, in the County of Stafford. (Repealed by Tunstall and Bosley, and Great Chell and Shelton Roads (Staffordshire, Cheshire) Act 1833 (3 & 4 Will. 4. c. liv))
Ternhill and Newport Road Act 1812	52 Geo. 3. c. lxxxix	5 May 1812
An Act for enlarging the Term and Powers of several Acts of His late and present Majesty, (Note: Chester to Birmingham Road Act 1759 (33 Geo. 2. c. 51)) (Note: Chester and Whitchurch Roads Act 1778 (18 Geo. 3. c. 86)) (Note: Whitchurch and Ternhill and Newport (Salop.) Road Act 1801 (41 Geo. 3. (U.K.) c. xc)) for repairing the Road from Ternhill to Newport, in the County of Salop.
Roads from Worksop, Debdale Hill and Kneesal Act 1812 (repealed)	52 Geo. 3. c. xc	5 May 1812
An Act for enlarging the Term and Powers of Two Acts of the Tenth (Note: Nottingham Roads Act 1770 (10 Geo. 3. c. 92)) and Thirty first (Note: Nottingham Roads (No. 2) Act 1791 (31 Geo. 3. c. 132)) Years of His present Majesty, for repairing the Road from Worksop to the Turnpike Road at Kelham, and from Debdale Hill to the Great Northern Road at South Muskham, in the County of Nottingham, and the Road branching out of the said Road at or near Kneesal and leading to the Great North Road at or near Carlton upon Trent, all in the same County. (Repealed by Worksop and Kelham, and Debdale Hill and South Muskham Roads Act 1839 (2 & 3 Vict. c. xv))
Roads in Perth and Forfar Act 1812 (repealed)	52 Geo. 3. c. xci	5 May 1812
An Act for more effectually repairing and maintaining certain Roads in the Counties of Perth and Forfar. (Repealed by Perth, Stirling and Forfar Roads and Bridges Act 1832 (2 & 3 Will. 4. c. lxxxii))
Storrington and Walberton Road Act 1812 (repealed)	52 Geo. 3. c. xcii	5 May 1812
An Act for repairing the Road from Storrington to Balls Hut, in Walberton, in the County of Sussex. (Repealed by Storrington and Walberton Road (Sussex) Act 1833 (3 & 4 Will. 4. c. lxxxi))
Road from Rowde Ford to Redhill Act 1812 (repealed)	52 Geo. 3. c. xciii	5 May 1812
An Act for continuing the Term, and altering and enlarging the Powers of an Act passed in the Thirtieth Year of His present Majesty, (Note: Wiltshire Roads (No. 2) Act 1790 (30 Geo. 3. c. 98)) for repairing and widening the Road from Rowde Forde to Red Hill, in the County of Wilts. (Repealed by Roads to and from Devizes Act 1820 (1 Geo. 4. c. lxix))
Yates' Estate Act 1812	52 Geo. 3. c. xciv	5 May 1812
An Act to enable Trustees, with the Consent therein mentioned, to grant Building Leases of a certain Field or Close, in the Parish of Saint Mary, Islington, in the County of Middlesex, Part of the settled Estates late of the Reverend Richard Sutton Yates, Doctor in Divinity, deceased, and for other Purposes therein mentioned.
Courtney's Estate Act 1812	52 Geo. 3. c. xcv	5 May 1812
An Act to enable the Guardian of Henry Courtney, a Minor, to make Leases of certain Parts of said Minor's Estates, in and near the City of Dublin.
Spateman and Outram Estates Act 1812	52 Geo. 3. c. xcvi	5 May 1812
An Act for establishing and confirming an Exchange of a Messuage and Lands in the Parish of Alfreton, in the County of Derby, purchased with the Sum of One hundred Pounds, bequeathed by the Will of George Spateman for charitable Purposes, for a Messuage and Lands of Joseph Outram Gentleman, in the Parish of Matlock, in the same County.
St. Mary Woolwich Glebe Lands and Rectory House Act 1812	52 Geo. 3. c. xcvii	5 May 1812
An Act to enlarge the Powers of an Act passed in the Forty ninth Year of the Reign of His present Majesty, intituled "An Act to enable the Rector of the Parish and Parish Church of Saint Mary, Woolwich, in the County of Kent, for the time being, to grant Building Leases of the Glebe Lands belonging to the said Rectory, and to sell the present Rectory House and Garden, and to build a new Rectory House." (Note: St. Mary Woolwich Rectory Act 1809 (49 Geo. 3. c. 88 Pr.))
Casterton Inclosure Act 1812	52 Geo. 3. c. xcviii	5 May 1812
An Act for inclosing Lands in the Manor of Casterton, in the Parish of Kirkby Lonsdale, in the County of Westmorland.
Burgh Castle and Herringfleet Inclosures Act 1812	52 Geo. 3. c. xcix	5 May 1812
An Act for inclosing Lands in the Parishes of Burgh Castle and Herringfleet in the County of Suffolk.
Grindleton, Bradford, Waddington and Bashall Inclosures Act 1812	52 Geo. 3. c. c	5 May 1812
An Act for inclosing Lands in Grindleton, Bradford, Waddington and Bashall, in the Parish of Mitton, in the County of York.
Scalthwaite-rigg, Hay and Hutton-'ith-Hay Inclosures Act 1812	52 Geo. 3. c. ci	5 May 1812
An Act for inclosing Lands within the Townships of Scalthwaiterigg, Hay and Hutton 'ith Hay, in the Parish of Kirkby, in Kendal, in the County of Westmorland.
Tonge Inclosure Act 1812	52 Geo. 3. c. cii	5 May 1812
An Act for inclosing Lands in Tonge, in the Parish of Bolton in the Moors, and County of Lancaster.
Alfreton Inclosure Act 1812	52 Geo. 3. c. ciii	5 May 1812
An Act for inclosing Lands in the Parish of Alfreton, in the County of Derby.
Blymhill Inclosure Act 1812	52 Geo. 3. c. civ	5 May 1812
An Act for inclosing Lands in the Parish of Blymhill, in the County of Stafford.
Boston Port and Harbour Act 1812	52 Geo. 3. c. cv	20 May 1812
An Act for improving the Port and Harbour of Boston, in the County of Lincoln; and for fixing the Wharfage of Goods landed within the said Port and Harbour; and for better maintaining the Buoys, Beacons, and Seamarks, belonging thereto.
Hay Railway Act 1812	52 Geo. 3. c. cvi	20 May 1812
An Act for enabling the Company of Proprietors of the Hay Railway to amend, vary, and extend the Line of the said Railway, and for altering and enlarging the Powers of an Act passed in the Fifty-first Year of the Reign of His present Majesty, (Note: Hay Railway Act 1811 (51 Geo. 3. c. cxxii)) for making and maintaining the said Railway.
Grosmont Railway Act 1812	52 Geo. 3. c. cvii	20 May 1812
An Act for making and maintaining a Railway from the End of the Llanvihangel Railway, in the Parish of Llanvihangel Crucorney, in the County of Monmouth, to or near to the Twelfth Mile Stone, in the Road leading from the Town of Abergavenny, in the County of Monmouth, to the City of Hereford.
Witham Navigation and Drainage Act 1812	52 Geo. 3. c. cviii	20 May 1812
An Act for rendering more effectual an Act of His present Majesty, (Note: Witham Drainage Act 1762 (2 Geo. 3. c. 32)) for draining Lands lying on both Sides the River Witham, in the County of Lincoln and restoring the Navigation of the said River; and for repealing another Act of His present Majesty, (Note: River Witham Drainage and Navigation Act 1808 (48 Geo. 3. c. cviii)) in relation to the said Drainage and Navigation.
St. Sidewell, Exeter, Parish Church Act 1812	52 Geo. 3. c. cix	20 May 1812
An Act for repairing the Parish Church of Saint Sidwell, in the City and County of the City of Exeter.
Bishop Stortford Parish Church Act 1812	52 Geo. 3. c. cx	20 May 1812
An Act for repairing the Parish Church of Bishop Stortford, in the County of Hertford.
Southwark, Bermondsey and Newington Improvement Act 1812 (repealed)	52 Geo. 3. c. cxi	20 May 1812
An Act for paving the Footpaths and for lighting and watching that Part of the Kent Street Road which leads from Kent Street End unto the Bridge next immediately below the Green Man Turnpike, situated within the Parish of Saint George the Martyr Southwark, in the County of Surrey, and certain Public Streets, Squares, Lanes, Passages and Places communicating therewith, respectively situated within the said Parish, or within the Parishes of Saint Mary Magdalen Bermondsey, and Saint Mary Newington, adjoining thereto; and for removing and preventing Encroachments and Annoyances therein. (Repealed by London Government (Borough of Bermondsey) Order in Council 1901 (SR&O 1901/264))
Lambeth, Clapham and Battersea Roads Act 1812 (repealed)	52 Geo. 3. c. cxii	20 May 1812
An Act for lighting and watching the Road leading from Newington Butts to the Nag's Head, on the Wandsworth Road, and several other Roads and Places communicating therewith, situate in the Parishes of Saint Mary Lambeth, Clapham and Battersea, in the County of Surrey. (Repealed by Surrey Roads Act 1846 (9 & 10 Vict. c. cccl))
Birmingham Improvement Act 1812 (repealed)	52 Geo. 3. c. cxiii	20 May 1812
An Act for better paving, lighting, watching, cleansing and otherwise improving the Town of Birmingham, in the County of Warwick; and for regulating the Police and Markets of the said Town. (Repealed by Birmingham Improvement Act 1828 (9 Geo. 4. c. liv))
London Docks Act 1812 (repealed)	52 Geo. 3. c. cxiv	20 May 1812
An Act for allowing further Time for the Completion of the Docks, Entrances and other Works and Buildings, belonging to the London Dock Company. (Repealed by London Docks Act 1828 (9 Geo. 4. c. cxvi))
Road from Offham to Ditchling Act 1812 (repealed)	52 Geo. 3. c. cxv	20 May 1812
An Act for repairing the Road from Offham to Ditchelling, in the County of Sussex. (Repealed by Road from Offham to Ditchling (Sussex) Act 1833 (3 & 4 Will. 4. c. lxxxii))
Banner Cross and Fox House Turnpike Road and Branch Act 1812 (repealed)	52 Geo. 3. c. cxvi	20 May 1812
An Act for making and maintaining a Turnpike Road from or near Banner Cross, in the West Riding of the County of York, through the Township of Dore, to or near to Fox House, in the County of Derby; and also a Branch from Dore aforesaid, to or near to Owler Bridge, in the said County of Derby. (Repealed by Sheffield and Chapel-en-le-Frith Roads Act 1825 (6 Geo. 4. c. cxliv))
Roads in Flintshire and Denbighshire Act 1812	52 Geo. 3. c. cxvii	20 May 1812
An Act for enlarging the Term and Powers of Two Acts of His present Majesty, for repairing Roads in the Counties of Flint and Denbigh, so far as the same relate to the Flint, Holywell and Mostyn Districts of Road.
Whitchurch to Aldermaston Road Act 1812 (repealed)	52 Geo. 3. c. cxviii	20 May 1812
An Act for enlarging the Term and Powers of Two Acts of His present Majesty, (Note: Whitchurch to Aldermaston Road Act 1770 (10 Geo. 3. c. 88)) (Note: Whitchurch to Aldermaston Road Act 1791 (31 Geo. 3. c. 119)) for repairing the Road from Whitchurch, (Note: Whitchurch, Hampshire.) in the County of Southampton, to Aldermaston Great Bridge, (Note: Aldermaston Bridge, carrying the A340 Basingstoke Road over the River Kennet, between Aldermaston and Aldermaston Wharf, Berkshire. 51°23′29″N 1°08′58″W) in the County of Berks. (Repealed by Whitchurch (Hampshire) and Aldermaston Road Act 1833 (3 & 4 Will. 4. c. lxxvii))
Roads from Bury St. Edmunds to Newmarket and to Brandon Act 1812 (repealed)	52 Geo. 3. c. cxix	20 May 1812
An Act for more effectually repairing the Roads from Bury Saint Edmunds to Newmarket, and from Brandon to Bury Saint Edmunds, in the Counties of Suffolk and Cambridge. (Repealed by Roads from Bury St. Edmunds to Newmarket and to Brandon Act 1833 (3 & 4 Will. 4. c. xcviii))
Road from Kentish Town to Upper Holloway Act 1812 (repealed)	52 Geo. 3. c. cxx	20 May 1812
An Act for altering and enlarging the Powers of an Act passed in the last Session of Parliament, (Note: Road from Kentish Town to Upper Holloway Act 1811 (51 Geo. 3. c. clvi)) for making a Public Carriage Road from Kentish Town to Upper Holloway, in the County of Middlesex. (Repealed by Kentish Town and Upper Holloway Road Act 1833 (3 & 4 Will. 4. c. c))
Tideswell and Slough Lane, and Edensor and Ashford Turnpike Roads Act 1812 (repealed)	52 Geo. 3. c. cxxi	20 May 1812
An Act for making and maintaining a Turnpike Road from Tideswell to Blackwell, and thence to Sough Lane; and also from Edensor to Ashford, all in the County of Derby. (Repealed by Ashford and Buxton, Tideswell and Blackwell, and Edensor and Ashford Turnpike Roads (Derbyshire) Act 1832 (2 & 3 Will. 4. c. iii))
Brougham and Penrith Road Act 1812 (repealed)	52 Geo. 3. c. cxxii	20 May 1812
An Act for making and maintaining a Road from the East End of a Close called Lord's Close, in the Parish of Brougham, in the County of Westmorland, into the Town of Penrith, in the County of Cumberland, and for building a Bridge in the Line of the said Road over the River Eamont, which divides the said Counties of Westmorland and Cumberland. (Repealed by Brougham and Penrith Road Act 1833 (3 & 4 Will. 4. c. lxxx))
Fowler's Estate and Walberton Glebe Lands Act 1812	52 Geo. 3. c. cxxiii	20 May 1812
An Act for confirming and rendering valid and effectual an Exchange made between Thomas Fowler Gentleman, and Mary his Wife, both deceased, and the Vicar of Walberton, in the County of Sussex, of Lands and Hereditaments of the said Thomas Fowler, in the Parish of Walberton, for a small Part of the Glebe belonging to the said Parish.
Sykes' Estate Act 1812	52 Geo. 3. c. cxxiv	20 May 1812
An Act for vesting Part of the settled Estates of Sir Mark Masterman Sykes Baronet, in Trustees, to be sold, subject to the Approbation of the High Court of Chancery; and for applying Part of the Purchase Monies for the Purposes therein mentioned, and for laying out the Residue of such Purchase Monies, under the like Direction, in the Purchase of other Estates to be settled to the former Uses.
Eglwysfach, Llansaintffraid-Glan-Conway and Llanelian in Rhôs Inclosures Act 1812	52 Geo. 3. c. cxxv	20 May 1812
An Act for inclosing Lands in such Part of the Parish of Eglwysfach as lies in the County of Denbigh, and in the several Parishes of Llanfaintffraid Glan Conway and Llanelian in Rhôs, in the same County.
Marrick Inclosure Act 1812	52 Geo. 3. c. cxxvi	20 May 1812
An Act for inclosing Lands in the Manor and Parish of Marrick, in the County of York.
St. Mary Extra and South Stoneham Inclosure Act 1812	52 Geo. 3. c. cxxvii	20 May 1812
An Act for inclosing Lands in Saint Mary Extra and South Stoneham, in the County of Southampton.
Aspatria, Brumfield and Allhallows Inclosures Act 1812	52 Geo. 3. c. cxxviii	20 May 1812
An Act for inclosing Lands in the Manor of Aspatria, and in the several Parishes of Aspatria, Brumfield and Allhallows, in the County of Cumberland.
Atteburgh Inclosure Act 1812	52 Geo. 3. c. cxxix	20 May 1812
An Act for inclosing Lands in the Parish of Attleburgh, in the County of Norfolk.
Thurlstone Inclosure Act 1812	52 Geo. 3. c. cxxx	20 May 1812
An Act for inclosing Lands in Thurlstone, in the Parish of Penistone, and County of York.
Asthal Inclosure Act 1812	52 Geo. 3. c. cxxxi	20 May 1812
An Act for inclosing Lands in the Parish of Asthal, in the County of Oxford.
Belton Inclosure Act 1812	52 Geo. 3. c. cxxxii	20 May 1812
An Act for inclosing Lands in the Parish of Belton, in the County of Leicester.
Itchen Abbas Inclosure Act 1812	52 Geo. 3. c. cxxxiii	20 May 1812
An Act for inclosing Lands in the Parish of Itchen Abbas, in the County of Southampton.
Warthill Inclosure Act 1812	52 Geo. 3. c. cxxxiv	20 May 1812
An Act for inclosing Lands in the Township of Warthill, in the County of York.
Great Bentley Inclosure Act 1812	52 Geo. 3. c. cxxxv	20 May 1812
An Act for inclosing Lands in the Manor of Great Bentley, in the County of Essex.
Delamere Forest Inclosure Act 1812 (repealed)	52 Geo. 3. c. cxxxvi	9 June 1812
An Act for inclosing the Forest of Delamere, in the County of Chester. (Repealed by Cheshire County Council Act 1980 (c. xiii))
Lord Dundas' Estate Act 1812	52 Geo. 3. c. cxxxvii	9 June 1812
An Act for enabling the Right Honourable Thomas Lord Dundas to sell certain Feu and Teind Duties and Casualties of the Earldom of Orkney, and Lordship of Zetland, upon entailing Lands equivalent in Value thereto.
Cork and Tralee Road Act 1812	52 Geo. 3. c. cxxxviii	9 June 1812
An Act for maintaining the Road leading from the City of Cork to the Town of Tralee, in the County of Kerry.
Merthyr Tydfil Road Act 1812 (repealed)	52 Geo. 3. c. cxxxix	9 June 1812
An Act for more effectually repairing the Road from the Old Furnace to Newbridge and Merthyr Tydvil, in the County of Glamorgan, and from Merthyr Tydvil to the Bridge over the River Taff, which divides the Counties of Glamorgan and Brecon. (Repealed by Turnpike Trusts in South Wales Act 1844 (7 & 8 Vict. c. 91))
Grand Junction Canal Act 1812	52 Geo. 3. c. cxl	9 June 1812
An Act to explain, amend, and enlarge the Powers of certain Acts (Note: Grand Junction Canal Act 1793 (33 Geo. 3. c. 80)) (Note: Grand Junction Canal Act 1794 (34 Geo. 3. c. 24)) (Note: Grand Junction Canal (No. 1) Act 1795 (35 Geo. 3. c. 8)) (Note: Grand Junction Canal (No. 2) Act 1795 (35 Geo. 3. c. 43)) (Note: Grand Junction Canal (No. 3) Act 1795 (35 Geo. 3. c. 85)) (Note: Grand Junction Canal (No. 4) Act 1795 (36 Geo. 3. c. 25)) (Note: Grand Junction Canal Act 1798 (38 Geo. 3. c. xxxiii)) (Note: Grand Junction Canal Act 1801 (41 Geo. 3. (U.K.) c. lxxi)) (Note: Grand Junction Canal Act 1803 (43 Geo. 3. c. viii)) (Note: Grand Junction Canal Act 1805 (45 Geo. 3. c. lxviii)) (Note: Grand Junction Canal Company and Paddington Water Supply Act 1811 (51 Geo. 3. c. clxix)) passed for making and maintaining the Grand Junction Canal.
London and Cambridge Junction Canal Act 1812	52 Geo. 3. c. cxli	9 June 1812
An Act for making and maintaining a navigable Canal with Aqueducts, Feeders, and Reservoirs, from the Stort Navigation at or near Bishop's Stortford, in the County of Hertford to join the River Cam near Clayhithe Sluice, in the County of Cambridge, with a navigable Branch or Cut from the said Canal at Sawston to Whaddon, in the County of Cambridge.
Anglesey Railway Act 1812	52 Geo. 3. c. cxlii	9 June 1812
An Act for making and maintaining a Railway from Penrhynmawr, in the Parish of Llanfihangel Esceisiog, to Redwharf, in the Parish of Llanbedrgoch, in the County of Anglesey; and also a Dock in the Parish of Llanbedrgoch aforesaid.
Newborough Parish Drainage, Inclosure and Church Act 1812	52 Geo. 3. c. cxliii	9 June 1812
An Act for draining, inclosing and improving the Lands called Borough Fen Common, and the Four Hundred Acre Common, in the County of Northampton; and for forming the same into a Parish, to be called Newborough; and for building and endowing a Church for such Parish.
Wildmore Fen and East and West Fens New Townships Act 1812 or the Fen Churches Act 1812	52 Geo. 3. c. cxliv	9 June 1812
An Act for forming into Townships certain Extraparochial Lands in Wildmore Fen, and in the West and East Fens, in the County of Lincoln.
Hundred Feet Washes Embankment Act 1812	52 Geo. 3. c. cxlv	9 June 1812
An Act for embanking The Hundred Feet Washes, in the Great Level of the Fens called Bedford Level.
Highgate Archway Company Act 1812 (repealed)	52 Geo. 3. c. cxlvi	9 June 1812
An Act for enabling The Highgate Archway Company raise a further Sum of Money, to complete their Works. (Repealed by Highgate Archway Act 1884 (47 & 48 Vict. c. xxi))
Vauxhall Bridge and Approaches Act 1812 (repealed)	52 Geo. 3. c. cxlvii	9 June 1812
An Act for altering and enlarging the Powers of an Act of His present Majesty, (Note: Vauxhall Bridge Act 1809 (49 Geo. 3. c. cxlii)) for erecting a Bridge across the River Thames, near Vauxhall and making Roads thereto in the Counties of Middlesex and Surrey. (Repealed by Local Law (Greater London Council and Inner London Boroughs) Order 1965 (SI 1965/540))
Greenwich Ferry and Approaches Act 1812	52 Geo. 3. c. cxlviii	9 June 1812
An Act for establishing a Ferry over the River Thames from Greenwich, in the County of Kent, to the Isle of Dogs, in the County of Middlesex, and for making and maintaining Roads to communicate therewith.
St. Botolph without Aldgate Improvement Act 1812 (repealed)	52 Geo. 3. c. cxlix	9 June 1812
An Act for widening and improving the Street or Road leading from Tower Hill to the Street called Upper East Smithfield, in the Parish of Saint Botolph without Aldgate, in the County of Middlesex. (Repealed by London Government (Borough of Stepney) Order in Council 1901 (SR&O 1901/276))
Gloucester and Hereford Roads Act 1812	52 Geo. 3. c. cl	9 June 1812
An Act for enlarging the Term and Powers of an Act of King George the First, (Note: Gloucester and Hereford Roads Act 1725 (12 Geo. 1. c. 13)) Two Acts of King George the Second, (Note: Gloucester and Hereford Roads Act 1746 (20 Geo. 2. c. 31)) (Note: Gloucester and Hereford Roads Act 1759 (33 Geo. 2. c. 34)) and an Act of His present Majesty, (Note: Gloucester and Hereford Roads Act 1769 (9 Geo. 3. c. 50)) for repairing the Roads from Gloucester towards Hereford, and other Roads therein mentioned, all in the County of Gloucester.
Carmarthen Roads Act 1812 (repealed)	52 Geo. 3. c. cli	9 June 1812
An Act for continuing the Term, and for altering and amending several Acts passed in the Third, (Note: Carmarthen and Pembroke Roads Act 1763 (3 Geo. 3. c. 34)) Twenty fourth (Note: Carmarthen Roads Act 1783 (24 Geo. 3. Sess. 1. c. 33)) and Forty third (Note: Carmarthen Roads Act 1803 (43 Geo. 3. c. xxx)) Years of His present Majesty, for repairing, amending and keeping in Repair, several Roads within the County of Carmarthen. (Repealed by Main Trust Roads (Carmarthen) Act 1828 (9 Geo. 4. c. lxxvi))
Carmarthen and Loughor, and Llanfihangel and Llandilofawr Roads Act 1812	52 Geo. 3. c. clii	9 June 1812
An Act for making a new Branch of Road from the Town of Carmarthen to Lougher, in the County of Glamorgan, and another Branch of Road from the Great Mountain to Llandilo, in the same County.
Carlow, Kilkenny and Tipperary Roads Act 1812 (repealed)	52 Geo. 3. c. cliii	9 June 1812
An Act for altering and enlarging the Powers of Two Acts passed in the Parliament of Ireland in the Thirtieth (Note: Road in Kilkenny and Tipperary Act 1790 (30 Geo. 3. c. 44 (I))) and Thirty second (Note: Kilkenny to Clogheen Road Act 1792 (32 Geo. 3. c. 39 (I))) Years of His present Majesty, and of an Act passed in the Forty fifth Year of His present Majesty, (Note: Carlow and Kilkenny Road Act 1805 (45 Geo. 3. c. lii)) for repairing several Roads in the Counties of Carlow, Kilkenny and Tipperary; and also for more effectually repairing and maintaining the Road leading from the Town of Clonmel, through the County of Waterford, to the Cross Roads of Knocklofty, in the County of Tipperary. (Repealed by Carlow, Kilkenny and Tipperary Roads Act 1833 (3 & 4 Will. 4. c. cxii))
Highbury and Shoreditch Road Act 1812 (repealed)	52 Geo. 3. c. cliv	9 June 1812
An Act for making a Public Carriage Road from the present Turnpike Road, near the South End of Highbury Place, Islington, to Haberdashers Walk, in the Parish of Saint Leonard, Shoreditch, in the County of Middlesex. (Repealed by New North Road Act 1833 (3 & 4 Will. 4. c. lxxxv))
Great Farringdon to Burford Road Act 1812 (repealed)	52 Geo. 3. c. clv	9 June 1812
An Act to continue the Term, and alter and enlarge the Powers of Two Acts of the Eleventh (Note: Farringdon to Burford Road Act 1771 (11 Geo. 3. c. 84)) and Thirty second (Note: Great Farringdon to Burford Road Act 1792 (32 Geo. 3. c. 150)) Years of His present Majesty, for repairing the Road from the Market House in the Town of Great Faringdon, in the County of Berks, to Burford, in the County of Oxford. (Repealed by Road from Great Faringdon to Burford (Berkshire, Oxfordshire) Act 1833 (3 & 4 Will. 4. c. lxxiii))
Austen's Coins and Medals Act 1812	52 Geo. 3. c. clvi	9 June 1812
An Act to vest the Coins and Medals given by the Will of Robert Austen Esquire, deceased, in the Governor and Company of the Bank of England. (Note: This act allowed Robert Austen's son to sell his coin collection to the Bank of England, notwithstanding that they were heirlooms according to Robert Austin's will. The Bank of England passed the collection, as part of their wider collection of coins, to the British Museum in 1877, who sold many of them as duplicates.)
Wigan Free Grammar School Act 1812 (repealed)	52 Geo. 3. c. clvii	9 June 1812
An Act for incorporating the Governors of the Free Grammar School of the Borough of Wigan, in the County Palatine of Lancaster; and for enlarging the Trusts and Powers of the said Governors, for the Benefit of the said School. (Repealed by Statute Law (Repeals) Act 2013 (c. 2))
Kidderminster Glebe Lands and Vicarage Act 1812	52 Geo. 3. c. clviii	9 June 1812
An Act to enable the Vicar, for the time being, of the Vicarage of Kidderminster, in the County of Worcester, to grant Building Leases of certain Glebe Lands, belonging to the said Vicarage, and to sell the present Vicarage House, Garden and Out Offices occupied therewith, and certain Part of the Glebe Land, and to purchase Land and build thereon a new Vicarage House.
West Compton Inclosure Act 1812	52 Geo. 3. c. clix	9 June 1812
An Act for dividing, allotting and inclosing Lands in the Tything or Hamlet of West Compton, in the Parish of Compton, in the County of Berks.
Wysingset, Stanfield and Horningtoft Inclosures Act 1812	52 Geo. 3. c. clx	9 June 1812
An Act for inclosing Lands in the Parishes of Wysingset otherwise Whissonsett, Stanfield and Horningtoft in the County of Norfolk.
Braughing Inclosure Act 1812	52 Geo. 3. c. clxi	9 June 1812
An Act for inclosing and exonerating from Tythes Lands in the Parish of Braughing, in the County of Hertford.
Upton (Huntingdonshire) Inclosure Act 1812	52 Geo. 3. c. clxii	9 June 1812
An Act for inclosing and exonerating from Tithes Lands in the Manor and Parish of Upton, in the County of Huntingdon.
Holbeach and Whaplode Inclosures Act 1812	52 Geo. 3. c. clxiii	9 June 1812
An Act for inclosing Lands in the Parishes of Holbeach and Whaplode, in the County of Lincoln.
Biddenham Inclosure Act 1812	52 Geo. 3. c. clxiv	9 June 1812
An Act for inclosing Lands in Biddenham, in the County of Bedford.
Llanarthney, Llanon, Llandebye and Llanvihangel Aberbythick Inclosures Act 1812	52 Geo. 3. c. clxv	9 June 1812
An Act to amend an Act of His present Majesty, (Note: Llanfihangel, &c. Inclosure Act 1811 (51 Geo. 3. c. 57 Pr.)) for inclosing Lands in the several Parishes of Llanarthney, Llanon, Llandebye and Llanvihangel Aberbythick, in the County of Carmarthen.
Windlesham Inclosure Act 1812	52 Geo. 3. c. clxvi	9 June 1812
An Act for inclosing Lands in the Parish of Windlesham, in the County of Surrey.
Stagsden Inclosure Act 1812	52 Geo. 3. c. clxvii	9 June 1812
An Act for inclosing Lands in Stagsden, in the County of Bedford.
Burton-upon-Trent Inclosure and Poor Rates Act 1812	52 Geo. 3. c. clxviii	9 June 1812
An Act for inclosing Lands in the Parish of Burton upon Trent, in the County of Stafford, and for selling Part of the said Lands, and applying the Produce thereof in Aid of the Poors' Rates of the said Parish.
Llangefni, Llanddyfnan, Pentraeth and Cerrigceinwen Inclosures Act 1812	52 Geo. 3. c. clxix	9 June 1812
An Act for inclosing Lands in Llangefni, Llanddyfnan, Pestraeth and Cerrigceinwen, in the County of Anglesey.
Darrington Inclosure Act 1812	52 Geo. 3. c. clxx	9 June 1812
An Act for inclosing Lands in Darrington, in the County of York.
Parkhurst Forest Disafforestation and Inclosure Act 1812 (repealed)	52 Geo. 3. c. clxxi	20 June 1812
An Act for disaforesting the Forest of Parkhurst, in the County of Southampton, and for inclosing the Open Commonable Lands within the said Forest. (Repealed by Crown Estate Act 1961 (9 & 10 Eliz. 2. c. 55) and Wild Creatures and Forest Laws Act 1971 (c. 47))
Edinburgh Police Act 1812	52 Geo. 3. c. clxxii	20 June 1812
An Act for altering and amending an Act of the Forty fifth Year of His present Majesty, (Note: Edinburgh Police Act 1805 (45 Geo. 3. c. xxi)) for regulating the Police of the City of Edinburgh, and the adjoining Districts; and for other Purposes relating thereto.
Kidwelly and Llanelly Canal and Tramroad Company Act 1812	52 Geo. 3. c. clxxiii	20 June 1812
An Act for the Improvement of the Harbour of Kidwelly, and for making and maintaining a Navigable Canal, or Tram Roads, in Kidwelly and Llanelly, and other Parishes therein mentioned, in the County of Carmarthen.
South Holland Embankment and Drainage Act 1812	52 Geo. 3. c. clxxiv	20 June 1812
An Act for amending and rendering more effectual an Act of the Thirty third Year of the Reign of His present Majesty, (Note: Moulton Inclosure Act 1793 (33 Geo. 3. c. 73 Pr.)) for embanking and draining certain Salt Marshes in the Parishes of Spaiding, Moulton, Whaplode, Holbech and Gedney, in the County of Lincoln; and also for repealing so much of an Act of the Thirty fourth Year of His present Majesty (Note: Lincoln Drainage, etc. Act 1794 (34 Geo. 3. c. 102)) as affects the Marshes and Sands on the Outside of the Sea Bank, lately made by virtue of the first mentioned Act.
Temple Bar Improvement (Raising of Capital by Lottery) Act 1812	52 Geo. 3. c. clxxv	20 June 1812
An Act to alter and amend Two Acts of His present Majesty, (Note: City of London Lottery Act 1806 (46 Geo. 3. c. xcvii)) (Note: London and Westminster Houses Lottery Act 1809 (49 Geo. 3. c. lxx)) for enabling the several Persons therein named to dispose of Houses in and near Skinner Street, in the City of London, and Pickett Street, Temple Bar, Westminster, by Lottery.
Brooke's Estate Act 1812	52 Geo. 3. c. clxxvi	20 June 1812
An Act for exchanging a Fee Simple Estate belonging to George Brooke Esquire, for Estates under Settlement, devised by the Will of the late Reverend John Brooke Clerk, in the Counties of Salop, Stafford, Warwick and Montgomery.
Coke's Estate Act 1812	52 Geo. 3. c. clxxvii	20 June 1812
An Act for effectuating an Exchange between Thomas William Coke Esquire, and the Trustees of his settled Estates.
Graham's Estate Act 1812	52 Geo. 3. c. clxxviii	20 June 1812
An Act for vesting certain Estates of John Graham Esquire, and John Smith Graham Gentleman, in Charles Court, in the Parish of Saint Martin in the Fields, in the County of Middlesex, in Trustees, to be sold; and for applying the Purchase Money in Discharge of a Mortgage affecting the same, and for laying out the Surplus in the Purchase of other Estates to be settled to the former Uses.
Jackson's Estate Act 1812	52 Geo. 3. c. clxxix	20 June 1812
An Act for vesting Part of the Estates devised by the Will of Elizabeth Jackson, in Trustees, for Sale, and for applying the Purchase Money in manner therein mentioned.
Browne's Estate Act 1812	52 Geo. 3. c. clxxx	20 June 1812
An Act for effecting the Sale of unsettled Freehold Estates, belonging to Thomas Whitmore Wylde Browne, an Infant, in Fee Simple, and for investing the Purchase Monies in other Real Estates, to be conveyed to the Infant in Fee Simple.
Wey and Appleshaw Inclosures Act 1812	52 Geo. 3. c. clxxxi	20 June 1812
An Act for inclosing Lands in the Parish of Wey otherwise Weyhill, within the Manor of Ramridge, in the County of Southampton, and in the Hamlet or Township of Appleshaw in the said County.
Londonderry Court House Act 1812	52 Geo. 3. c. clxxxii	27 June 1812
An Act for erecting a Court House, County House, or Sessions House, for the Use of the City and County of Londonderry.
Blackfriars Bridge Improvement Act 1812	52 Geo. 3. c. clxxxiii	27 June 1812
An Act for increasing the Fund for watching, lighting, cleansing, watering and repairing Blackfriars Bridge.
Jenkinson's Estate Act 1812	52 Geo. 3. c. clxxxiv	27 June 1812
An Act for effecting the Sale of Part of the settled Estates of the Honourable Charles Cecil Cope Jenkinson; and for laying out the Money to arise by such Sale in the Purchase of other Estates, and for settling the same to the former Uses.
Whitby Piers and Harbour Act 1812 (repealed)	52 Geo. 3. c. clxxxv	1 July 1812
An Act for enlarging the Term and Powers of an Act of King George the Second, (Note: Whitby Harbour Act 1749 (23 Geo. 2. c. 39)) and an Act of His present Majesty, (Note: Whitby Harbour Act 1781 (21 Geo. 3. c. 12)) for the more effectual repairing and maintaining of the Piers and Harbour of Whitby in the County of York. (Repealed by Whitby Piers and Harbour Act 1827 (7 & 8 Geo. 4. c. lxxviii))
Margate Pier and Harbour Company Act 1812 (repealed)	52 Geo. 3. c. clxxxvi	1 July 1812
An Act for separating the Management of the Harbour of Margate, in the County of Kent, from the Paving and Lighting of the Town of Margate, and for vesting the future Management of the said Harbour in a Joint Stock Company of Proprietors. (Repealed by Margate Pier and Harbour Revision Order 1992 (SI 1993/1313))
Lord Braybrooke's Estate Act 1812	52 Geo. 3. c. clxxxvii	1 July 1812
An Act for vesting the settled Estates in the County of Northampton of Richard Aldworth Griffin Lord Braybrooke, and Part of the devised Estates in the County of Essex of John Grifin Lord Howard de Walden and Lord Braybrooke, deceased, in Trustees, to be sold; and for laying out the Monies thence arising, under the Direction of the High Court of Chancery, in the Purchase of other Estates, to be settled to the same Uses.
East India Company and the Nabobs of the Carnatic Act 1812 (repealed)	52 Geo. 3. c. clxxxviii	9 July 1812
An Act for further continuing until the First Day of August One thousand eight hundred and sixteen, and from thence until the End of the then next Session of Parliament, the Powers of the Commissioners appointed in pursuance of an Act of the Forty sixth Year of His present Majesty, (Note: East India Company and the Nabobs of the Carnatic Act 1806 (46 Geo. 3. c. cxxxiii)) for enabling the Commissioners acting in pursuance of an Agreement between the East India Company and the private Creditors of the Nabobs of the Carnatic, to carry the same into Effect. (Repealed by Statute Law (Repeals) Act 2008 (c. 12))
Earl of Moira's Estate Act 1812	52 Geo. 3. c. clxxxix	9 July 1812
An Act for exchanging Part of the settled Estates of the Right Honourable Francis Earl of Moira, situate in the County of Leicester, for Part of the unsettled Estates of the said Earl, situate in the County of Derby.
Earl of Moira's Estate (No. 2) Act 1812	52 Geo. 3. c. cxc	9 July 1812
An Act to enable Francis Earl of Moira and the Persons entitled in Reversion expectant on his Estate for Life, to grant Leases of Mines and Mineral Property on their Estates, in Ashby de la Zouch in the County of Leicester, and Oakthorpe in the County of Derby.
Earl of Abingdon's Estate Act 1812	52 Geo. 3. c. cxci	9 July 1812
An Act for enabling the Right Honourable Montague Earl of Abingdon to grant Leases for Lives, or for Years determinable on Lives, of his settled Estates in the Parishes of Cumner alias Cumber, and Hinksey, in the County of Berks, upon the Terms and subject to the Restrictions therein mentioned.
Grand Junction Canal and Bishop of London and others Agreement Act 1812	52 Geo. 3. c. cxcii	9 July 1812
An Act for confirming and carrying into Execution certain Articles of Agreement made and entered into between the Right Reverend Father in God John Lord Bishop of London, Sir John Frederick Baronet, Arthur Stanhope Esquire, Frederick Treise Morshead Esquire, Sir John Morshead Baronet, and Dame Elizabeth his Wife, and Selina Thistlethwayte; and the Company of Proprietors of The Grand Junction Canal.
City of London and See of London Estates Act 1812	52 Geo. 3. c. cxciii	9 July 1812
An Act to enable the Mayor and Commonalty and Citizens of the City of London to sell, and the Right Reverend the Lord Bishop of London and his Lessees of the Estate at Paddington, belonging to the See of London, to purchase certain Waters and Springs, and the Conduits and other Appurtenances thereto, within the several Parishes of Mary le bone and Paddington, in the County of Middlesex.
Aquilar's Estate Act 1812	52 Geo. 3. c. cxciv	9 July 1812
An Act for vesting a Messuage, with the Appurtenances, situate in Devonshire Square in the City of London, and a Messuage and Lands situate at Wimbledon in the County of Surrey, Part of Estates settled by the Will of Abraham Aguilar deceased, in Trustees, to be sold, and for other the Purposes therein mentioned.
Regent's Canal Act 1812	52 Geo. 3. c. cxcv	13 July 1812
An Act for making and maintaining a navigable Canal from the Grand Junction Canal in the Parish of Paddington, to the River Thames in the Parish of Limehouse, with a Collateral Cut in the Parish of Saint Leonard, Shoreditch, in the County of Middlesex.
Ryde Pier Act 1812	52 Geo. 3. c. cxcvi	13 July 1812
An Act for making a Pier and Landing Place at Ryde, in the Isle of Wight.
Lambeth Improvement Act 1812 (repealed)	52 Geo. 3. c. cxcvii	18 July 1812
An Act for watching and lighting Part of the High Road leading from London to Croydon, commencing at the Turnpike Gate at Kennington, in the Parish of Saint Mary Lambeth, in the County of Surrey, and leading from thence on the Line of the said Road, to Brixton Hill, and as far as the said Parish extends in that Direction. (Repealed by London Government (Borough of Lambeth) Order in Council 1901 (SR&O 1901/219))
Road from the Kent Road to Deptford and Horsleydown Branch Act 1812	52 Geo. 3. c. cxcviii	18 July 1812
An Act for amending an Act of His present Majesty, (Note: Road from Kent Road to Deptford and Horsleydown Act 1811 (51 Geo. 3. c. ccxx)) for making a Road from the Kent Road in the County of Surrey, to Deptford in the County of Kent, and a Branch therefrom to Horsleydown, in the said County of Surrey.
Fyfield and St. John's Bridge Road Act 1812 (repealed)	52 Geo. 3. c. cxcix	18 July 1812
An Act for enlarging the Term and Powers of Two Acts of King George the Second, (Note: Fyfield and St. John's Bridge Road Act 1732 (6 Geo. 2. c. 16)) (Note: Berkshire Roads Act 1738 (12 Geo. 2. c. 11)) and Two Acts of His present Majesty, (Note: Fyfield, St. John's and Newbridge Road Act 1763 (3 Geo. 3. c. 29)) (Note: Fyfield and St. John's Bridge, and Kingston Bagpuize and Newbridge Roads Act 1791 (31 Geo. 3. c. 105)) for repairing the Road from Fyfield, in the County of Berks, to Saint John's Bridge, in the County of Gloucester. (Repealed by Fyfield and St. John's Bridge, and Kingston Bagpuize and Newbridge Roads Act 1833 (3 & 4 Will. 4. c. xci))
Shaw's Estate Act 1812	52 Geo. 3. c. cc	18 July 1812
An Act for enabling the Devisees in Trust named in the Will George Shaw deceased, to grant Building Leases of certain situate in the Parish of Saint Dunstan Stepney otherwise Stebunheath, in the County of Middlesex, thereby devised.
Prebend of Beachill and Knaresborough's Estate Act 1812	52 Geo. 3. c. cci	18 July 1812
An Act for vesting in Trustees Part of the Great Tithes of the Prebend of Beachill and Knaresbrough, in the County of York, in Trust, to be sold; and for laying out the Monies thence arising, in the Purchase of Estates to be settled and annexed to the said Prebend.
Waller's Estate Act 1812	52 Geo. 3. c. ccii	18 July 1812
An Act for enabling the Trustees of the settled Estates of Edmond Waller Esquire, deceased, to raise Money upon Mortgage of the same Estates, for the Purpose of satisfying the Fines payable to the Bishop of Winchester, for the Lease of the Manor of Moreton, in the County of Buckingham; and for vesting the said Leasehold Premises in the Trustees, upon Trusts, corresponding to the Uses of the settled Estates.
Price's Estate Act 1812	52 Geo. 3. c. cciii	18 July 1812
An Act for vesting the devised Estates of John Price Esquire, deceased, in Trustees, upon Trust to sell certain Parts thereof, and out of the Purchase Money to discharge a Mortgage Debt due to the Representatives of Charles Gore Esquire, deceased, and to lay out the Residue, under the Directions of the High Court of Chancery, in the Purchase of other Estates, and to stand seised of and convey the Estates to be so purchased, as well as those remaining unsold, to the Uses of the said John Price's Will.
O'Connor's Estate Act 1812	52 Geo. 3. c. cciv	18 July 1812
An Act for vesting Part of the settled Estates of Maurice Nugent O'Connor Esquire, in the County of Roscommon, in Ireland, in Trustees, to be sold for Payment of Incumbrances, and for settling other Estates in the King's County, in Ireland, in lieu of the Estates so to be sold.
Parish of St. Paul Shadwell Leasing Act 1812	52 Geo. 3. c. ccv	22 July 1812
An Act to enable the Dean of Saint Paul London to grant a Lease of Messuages, Tenements, Lands and Hereditaments in the Parish of Saint Paul Shadwell, in the County of Middlesex, and to enable the Lessees to grant Sub Leases for building on and repairing that Estate.
South Cove and Depding Rectories Advowson Exchange Act 1812	52 Geo. 3. c. ccvi	22 July 1812
An Act for effectuating an Exchange of the Advowson of the Rectory of the Church of South Cove in the County of Suffolk, belonging to His Majesty, for the Advowson of the Rectory of the Church of Depding otherwise Depden, in the same County, belonging to Sir Thomas Gooch Baronet.
Philipp's Estate Act 1812	52 Geo. 3. c. ccvii	22 July 1812
An Act for vesting Part of the devised Estates of George Philipps Esquire, deceased, situate in the County and County Borough of Carmarthen in Trustees, to be sold, and for laying out the Monies thence arising in the Purchase of other Estates, to be settled to the same Uses.
Beddington with Bandon Inclosure Act 1812	52 Geo. 3. c. ccviii	22 July 1812
An Act for inclosing Lands in the Manor of Beddington, with the Manor of Bandon, in the County of Surrey.
Debtors' Prison for London and Middlesex Act 1812 (repealed)	52 Geo. 3. c. ccix	29 July 1812
An Act for building a new Prison in the City of London, (Note: Whitecross Street Prison.) for removing thereto Prisoners confined under Civil Process in the Gaol of Newgate (Note: Newgate Prison.) and the Two Compters of the said City, (Note: Giltspur Street Compter and Poultry Compter.) and also the Prison of Ludgate, (Note: Ludgate.) and for converting the Building now containing the said Two Compters and Ludgate into a Gaol for Criminals in the said Two Compters and into a House of Correction for the said City of London. (Repealed by Statute Law (Repeals) Act 2008 (c. 12))
Orphan's Fund Act 1812	52 Geo. 3. c. ccx	29 July 1812
An Act for enabling the Mayor and Commonalty and Citizens of the City of London to improve and grant Building Leases of the Ground in Moorfields; also to sell all the Ground comprised in such Leases when improved, and to apply the Produce thereof towards increasing the Orphans Fund.
St. George's Fields (Surrey) Improvement Act 1812	52 Geo. 3. c. ccxi	29 July 1812
An Act for the further Improvement of Saint George's Fields, in the County of Surrey.
Longham, Kempston, Mileham and Beeston-next-Mileham Allotments Act 1812	52 Geo. 3. c. ccxii	5 May 1812
An Act for allotting Lands in the Parishes of Longham, Kempston Mileham, and Beeston next Mileham, in the County of Norfolk.

=== Private acts ===
Short title	Citation	Royal assent
Long title
Dietrichsen's Naturalization Act 1812	52 Geo. 3. c. 1 Pr.	28 February 1812
An Act for naturalizing Christian Dietrichaen.
Nettleton Inclosure Act 1812	52 Geo. 3. c. 2 Pr.	20 March 1812
An Act for inclosing Lands in the Parish of Nettleton, in the County of Wilts.
Brandon Parva Inclosure Act 1812	52 Geo. 3. c. 3 Pr.	20 March 1812
An Act for inclosing Lands in the Parish of Brandon Parva otherwise Little Brand, in the County of Norfolk.
Holdfast Inclosure Act 1812	52 Geo. 3. c. 4 Pr.	20 March 1812
An Act for inclosing Lands in the Hamlet or Chapelry of Holdfast, in the Parish of Ripple, in the County of Worcester.
Honingham Inclosure Act 1812	52 Geo. 3. c. 5 Pr.	20 March 1812
An Act for inclosing Lands in Honingham, in the County of Norfolk.
West Thorney Inclosure Act 1812	52 Geo. 3. c. 6 Pr.	20 March 1812
An Act for inclosing Lands in the Island and Parish of West Thorney, in the County of Sussex.
Lindley Inclosure Act 1812	52 Geo. 3. c. 7 Pr.	20 March 1812
An Act for inclosing Lands in Lindley, in the Parish of Huddersfield, in the West Riding of the County of York.
Toft Inclosure Act 1812	52 Geo. 3. c. 8 Pr.	20 March 1812
An Act for inclosing Lands in the Parish of Toft, in the County of Cambridge.
Wormington Inclosure Act 1812	52 Geo. 3. c. 9 Pr.	20 March 1812
An Act for inclosing Lands in the Parish of Wormington, in the County of Gloucester.
Charlton Inclosure Act 1812	52 Geo. 3. c. 10 Pr.	20 March 1812
An Act for inclosing Lands in the Parish of Charlton Horethorne, in the County of Somerset.
Gussage Inclosure Act 1812	52 Geo. 3. c. 11 Pr.	20 March 1812
An Act for inclosing Lands in the Parish of Gussage Saint Michael, in the County of Dorset.
Shipston-upon-Stour Inclosure Act 1812	52 Geo. 3. c. 12 Pr.	20 March 1812
An Act for inclosing Lands in the Parish of Shipston upon Stower, in the County of Worcester.
Bodymoor Heath Inclosure Act 1812	52 Geo. 3. c. 13 Pr.	20 March 1812
An Act for inclosing Lands in the Township of Bodymoor Heath, or Heath Houses, in the County of Warwick.
Osmondeston, &c. Inclosure Act 1812	52 Geo. 3. c. 14 Pr.	20 March 1812
An Act for inclosing Lands in the Parishes of Osmondeston otherwise Scole and Frenze, in the County of Norfolk.
Palgrave Inclosure Act 1812	52 Geo. 3. c. 15 Pr.	20 March 1812
An Act for inclosing Lands in the Parish of Palgrave, in the County of Suffolk.
Milborne Port Inclosure Act 1812	52 Geo. 3. c. 16 Pr.	20 March 1812
An Act for inclosing Lands in the Parish of Milborne Port, in the County of Somerset.
Earsham, &c. Inclosure Act 1812	52 Geo. 3. c. 17 Pr.	20 March 1812
An Act for inclosing Lands in the Parishes of Earsham, Ditchingham and Hedenham, in the County of Norfolk.
Horsham Inclosure Act 1812	52 Geo. 3. c. 18 Pr.	20 March 1812
An Act for inclosing Lands in the Parish of Horsham, in County of Sussex.
Bromer's Naturalization Act 1812	52 Geo. 3. c. 19 Pr.	20 March 1812
An Act for naturalizing David Bromer.
Boyeson's Naturalization Act 1812	52 Geo. 3. c. 20 Pr.	20 March 1812
An Act for naturalizing Andrew Boyeson.
Winchcomb Inclosure Act 1812	52 Geo. 3. c. 21 Pr.	25 March 1812
An Act for inclosing Lands in the Hamlets of Greet and Sudely Tenements, in the Parish of Winchcomb, in the County of Gloucester.
Haresfield Inclosure Act 1812	52 Geo. 3. c. 22 Pr.	25 March 1812
An Act for inclosing Lands in the Parish of Haresfield, in the County of Gloucester.
Longney Inclosure Act 1812	52 Geo. 3. c. 23 Pr.	25 March 1812
An Act for inclosing Lands in the Parish of Longney, in the County of Gloucester.
Little Paxton Inclosure Act 1812	52 Geo. 3. c. 24 Pr.	25 March 1812
An Act for inclosing Lands in Little Paxton, in the County of Huntingdon.
Brocklesby, &c. Inclosure Act 1812	52 Geo. 3. c. 25 Pr.	20 April 1812
An Act for allotting and exonerating from Tithes, Lands in the Parishes of Brocklesby and Great Limber, in the County of Lincoln.
Great Wratting Inclosure Act 1812	52 Geo. 3. c. 26 Pr.	20 April 1812
An Act for inclosing Lands in the Parish of Great Wratting otherwise Talworth Wratting, in the County of Suffolk.
Witton Bacton, &c. Inclosure Act 1812	52 Geo. 3. c. 27 Pr.	20 April 1812
An Act for inclosing Lands in the Parishes of Witton Bacton, Edingthorpe and Paston, in the County of Norfolk.
Hillingdon Inclosure Act 1812	52 Geo. 3. c. 28 Pr.	20 April 1812
An Act for inclosing and exonerating from Tithes, Lands in the Parish of Hillingdon, in the County of Middlesex.
Rucker's Naturalization Act 1812	52 Geo. 3. c. 29 Pr.	20 April 1812
An Act for naturalizing John Diderich Rucker.
Meyer's Naturalization Act 1812	52 Geo. 3. c. 30 Pr.	20 April 1812
An Act for naturalizing Frederick Charles Meyer.
Green's Naturalization Act 1812	52 Geo. 3. c. 31 Pr.	20 April 1812
An Act for naturalizing Charles Green.
Desvignes' Naturalization Act 1812	52 Geo. 3. c. 32 Pr.	20 April 1812
An Act for naturalizing Elisée Hubert Desvignes .
Mr O'Neill's Indemnity Act 1812	52 Geo. 3. c. 33 Pr.	5 May 1812
An Act to relieve the Honourable John Bruce Richard O'Neill, who was elected to serve in this present Parliament for the County of Antrim, from certain Penalties which he has incurred by sitting and voting in the House of Commons without having taken the Oaths, and in other Respects conformed to the Laws in such Case made and provided.
Earl of Bristol's Estate Act 1812	52 Geo. 3. c. 34 Pr.	5 May 1812
An Act for vetting certain Manors and Hereditaments situate in the Parish of Littlebury, in the County of Essex, Parts of the settled Estates of the Right Honourable Frederick William Earl of Bristol, in Trustees, upon Trust to sell; and for laying out the Monies arising from such Sale in the Purchase of more convenient Estates; and for other Purposes therein mentioned.
Ousden Inclosure Act 1812	52 Geo. 3. c. 35 Pr.	5 May 1812
An Act for dividing Lands in the Parish of Ousden otherwise Owsden, in the County of Suffolk.
Newton-upon-Ouze, &c. Inclosure Act 1812	52 Geo. 3. c. 36 Pr.	5 May 1812
An Act for inclosing Lands in the Parish of Newton upon Ouze, and in the Township of Shipton, in the Parish of Overton, in the County of York.
Grafton Inclosure Act 1812	52 Geo. 3. c. 37 Pr.	5 May 1812
An Act for inclosing Lands in the Parish of Grafton, in the County of Warwick.
Lopham Inclosure Act 1812	52 Geo. 3. c. 38 Pr.	5 May 1812
An Act for inclosing Lands in North Lopham and South Lopham, in the County of Norfolk.
Lidgate Inclosure Act 1812	52 Geo. 3. c. 39 Pr.	5 May 1812
An Act for inclosing Lands in the Parish of Lidgate, in the County of Suffolk.
Wymering, &c. Inclosure Act 1812	52 Geo. 3. c. 40 Pr.	5 May 1812
An Act for inclosing Lands in the Parishes of Wymering and Widley, and Hamlets of Cosham and Hilsea, on the South Side of Portsdown Hill, in the County of Hants.
Ovington Inclosure Act 1812	52 Geo. 3. c. 41 Pr.	5 May 1812
An Act for inclosing Lands in the Parish of Ovington, in the County of Southampton.
Pinxton Inclosure Act 1812	52 Geo. 3. c. 42 Pr.	5 May 1812
An Act for inclosing Lands in the Parish of Pinxton, in the Counties of Derby and Nottingham.
Stainburn Inclosure Act 1812	52 Geo. 3. c. 43 Pr.	5 May 1812
An Act for inclosing Lands in the Township and Manor of Stainburn, in the County of Cumberland.
Eaglesfield and Blindbothel Inclosure Act 1812	52 Geo. 3. c. 44 Pr.	5 May 1812
An Act for inclosing Lands in the Townships of Eaglesfield and Blindbothel, in the Manor of Five Towns with Eaglesfield, in the County of Cumberland.
Badsey Inclosure Act 1812	52 Geo. 3. c. 45 Pr.	5 May 1812
An Act for inclosing Lands in the Parish of Badsey, in the County of Worcester.
Bampton Inclosure Act 1812	52 Geo. 3. c. 46 Pr.	5 May 1812
An Act for inclosing Lands in the Parish of Bampton, in the County of Oxford.
Edgefield Inclosure Act 1812	52 Geo. 3. c. 47 Pr.	5 May 1812
An Act for inclosing Lands in the Parish of Edgefield, in the County of Norfolk.
Ackton Inclosure Act 1812	52 Geo. 3. c. 48 Pr.	5 May 1812
An Act for inclosing Lands in the Manor and Township of Ackton, in the Parish of Featherstone, in the West Riding of the County of York.
Cold Higham Inclosure Act 1812	52 Geo. 3. c. 49 Pr.	5 May 1812
An Act for inclosing Lands in the Parish of Cold Higham with Grimscote, in the County of Northampton, and for extinguishing the Tithes thereof, and of Potcote, in the said Parish.
Brinsworth Inclosure Act 1812	52 Geo. 3. c. 50 Pr.	5 May 1812
An Act for inclosing Lands within the Township of Brinsworth, in the County of York.
Barton, &c. Inclosure Act 1812	52 Geo. 3. c. 51 Pr.	5 May 1812
An Act for inclosing Lands in the Parishes of Barton Hartshorne and Chetwode, in the County of Buckingham.
Clayhidon Inclosure Act 1812	52 Geo. 3. c. 52 Pr.	5 May 1812
An Act for inclosing Lands in the Manor of Clayhidon, in the Parish of Clayhidon, in the County of Devon.
Pebworth Inclosure Act 1812	52 Geo. 3. c. 53 Pr.	5 May 1812
An Act for inclosing Lands in the Parish of Pebworth, in the County of Gloucester.
Rothwell Inclosure Act 1812	52 Geo. 3. c. 54 Pr.	5 May 1812
An Act for inclosing Lands within the Parish of Rothwell otherwise Rowell, in the County of Northampton.
Kirkby Thure Inclosure Act 1812	52 Geo. 3. c. 55 Pr.	20 May 1812
An Act for inclosing Lands in Kirkby Thure, in the County of Westmorland.
Ashchurch Inclosure Act 1812	52 Geo. 3. c. 56 Pr.	20 May 1812
An Act for inclosing Lands in the Township of Aston upon Carrant and Pamington Homedowns, in the Parish of Ashchurch, in the County of Gloucester.
Llanelly, &c. Inclosure Act 1812	52 Geo. 3. c. 57 Pr.	20 May 1812
An Act for inclosing Lands in the several Parishes of Llanelly, Llangenech and Llanedy, within the Commot (Note: A commote is a land division in Wales.) of Carnawllon, (Note: The commote of Carnwyllon is now known as Llanelli.) in the Lordship of Kidwelly, in the County of Carmarthen.
Stapleford Inclosure Act 1812	52 Geo. 3. c. 58 Pr.	20 May 1812
An Act for inclosing Lands in the Parish of Stapleford, in the County of Cambridge.
West Wickham Inclosure Act 1812	52 Geo. 3. c. 59 Pr.	20 May 1812
An Act for inclosing Lands in the Parish of West Wickham, in the County of Cambridge.
Brockham and East Betchwork Inclosure Act 1812	52 Geo. 3. c. 60 Pr.	20 May 1812
An Act for inclosing Lands in the Manor of Brockham and East Betchworth, within the Parish of Betchworth, in the County of Surrey.
Llanrhystid, &c. Inclosure Act 1812	52 Geo. 3. c. 61 Pr.	20 May 1812
An Act for inclosing Lands in the Parish of Llanrhystid, and the several other Parishes therein mentioned, in the County of Cardigan.
Llanfyndd, &c. Inclosure Act 1812	52 Geo. 3. c. 62 Pr.	20 May 1812
An Act for inclosing Lands in the several Parishes of Llanfynydd, Llanegwad, Llangathen and Llanfihangel Kilvargan, in the County of Carmarthen.
De Courtenay's Naturalization Act 1812	52 Geo. 3. c. 63 Pr.	20 May 1812
An Act for naturalizing Jean de Courtenay.
Creech St. Michael Inclosure Act 1812	52 Geo. 3. c. 64 Pr.	9 June 1812
An Act for inclosing Lands in the Parish of Creech Saint Michael, in the County of Somerset.
Tatenhill, &c. Inclosure Act 1812	52 Geo. 3. c. 65 Pr.	9 June 1812
An Act for inclosing Lands in the Townships of Barton under Needwood and Tatenhill, in the Parish of Tatenhill, and in the Townships of Yoxall and Hoarcross, in the Parish of Yoxall, and in the Townships of Nethertown and Hampstall Ridware, in the Parish of Hampstall Ridware, in the County of Stafford.
Martin Inclosure Act 1812	52 Geo. 3. c. 66 Pr.	9 June 1812
An Act for inclosing Lands in the Hamlet of Martin in the Parish of Great Bedwin, in the County of Wilts.
Saffron Walden Inclosure Act 1812	52 Geo. 3. c. 67 Pr.	9 June 1812
An Act for inclosing Lands in Saffron Walden, in the County of Essex.
Llanrwst Inclosure Act 1812	52 Geo. 3. c. 68 Pr.	9 June 1812
An Act for inclosing Lands in the Parish of Llanrwst, in the Counties of Denbigh and Carnarvon.
West Buckland Inclosure Act 1812	52 Geo. 3. c. 69 Pr.	9 June 1812
An Act for inclosing Lands in the Parish of West Buckland, in the County of Somerset.
Poling Inclosure Act 1812	52 Geo. 3. c. 70 Pr.	9 June 1812
An Act for inclosing Lands in the Parish of Poling, in the County of Sussex.
Chalton, &c. Inclosure Act 1812	52 Geo. 3. c. 71 Pr.	9 June 1812
An Act for inclosing Lands in Chalton, Catherington, Clanfield, Blendworth and Idsworth, in the County of Southampton.
Birch Inclosure Act 1812	52 Geo. 3. c. 72 Pr.	9 June 1812
An Act for inclosing Lands in the Parishes of Much Birch and Little Birch, in the County of Hereford.
Moore's Divorce Act 1812	52 Geo. 3. c. 73 Pr.	9 June 1812
An Act to dissolve the Marriage of Richard Moore Esquire with Sidney Arabella Moore his now Wife, and to enable him to marry again; and for other Purposes therein mentioned.
Blachford's Divorce Act 1812	52 Geo. 3. c. 74 Pr.	9 June 1812
An Act to dissolve the Marriage of John Blachford Esquire, with Maria Camilla Blachford his now Wife, and to enable him to marry again; and for other Purposes therein mentioned.
Nevin, &c. Inclosure Act 1812	52 Geo. 3. c. 75 Pr.	20 June 1812
An Act for inclosing Lands in the Parish of Nevin, and other Parishes and Places therein mentioned, in the County of Carnarvon.
Penmorfa, &c. Inclosure Act 1812	52 Geo. 3. c. 76 Pr.	9 July 1812
An Act for inclosing Lands in the Parishes of Penmorfa, Dolbenmaen, and Llanfihangel y Pennant, in the County of Carnarvon.
De Lisle's Estate Settlement Act 1812	52 Geo. 3. c. 77 Pr.	13 July 1812
An Act to enable Robert De Lisle to make a valid Settlement on the Marriage intended between him and Anne Salvin Spinster, notwithstanding his Minority.

=== Sources ===
- The Statutes of the United Kingdom of Great Britain and Ireland, 52 George III. London: Joseph Butterworth. 1812 – via Google Books.
- Journals of the House of Commons. Vol. 67. London: His Majesty's Stationery Office. pp. 3–566 – via Google Books.
- Chronological Table of and Index to the Statutes. Vol. 1: To the End of the Session 59 Vict. Sess. 2 (1895) (13th ed.). London: Her Majesty's Stationery Office. 1896. pp. 199–202 – via Google Books.

== 53 Geo. 3 ==
The first session of the 5th Parliament of the United Kingdom, which met from 24 November 1812 until 22 July 1813.

This session was also traditionally cited as 53 G. 3.

=== Public general acts ===
Short title	Citation	Royal assent
Long title
Use of Sugar in Brewing (Great Britain) (No. 2) Act 1812 (repealed)	53 Geo. 3. c. 1	16 December 1812
An Act to continue until the First Day of October One thousand eight hundred and thirteen, an Act of the last Session of Parliament, (Note: Use of Sugar in Brewing (Great Britain) Act 1812 (52 Geo. 3. c. 65)) for allowing the Use of Sugar in Brewing Beer in Great Britain. (Repealed by Statute Law Revision Act 1873 (36 & 37 Vict. c. 91))
Importation, etc. (No. 2) Act 1812 (repealed)	53 Geo. 3. c. 2	16 December 1812
An Act to continue until the First Day of October One thousand eight hundred and thirteen, and amend an Act of the last Session of Parliament (Note: Manufacture of Starch from Wheat, etc. Act 1812 (52 Geo. 3. c. 127)) for prohibiting the making of Starch, Hair Powder and Blue, from Wheat and other Articles of Food; and for suspending Part of the Duties now payable on the Importation into Great Britain of Starch. (Repealed by Making of Starch Act 1813 (53 Geo. 3. c. 23))
Intercourse Between Jamaica and Saint Domingo Act 1812 (repealed)	53 Geo. 3. c. 3	22 December 1812
An Act to amend an Act of the last Session of Parliament, (Note: Jamaica and Saint Domingo Act 1812 (52 Geo. 3. c. 35)) for prohibiting the Intercourse between the Islands of Jamaica and Saint Domingo. (Repealed by Customs Law Repeal Act 1825 (6 Geo. 4. c. 105))
Purchase of Estate for Duke of Wellington Act 1812 (repealed)	53 Geo. 3. c. 4	22 December 1812
An Act for granting a Sum of Money for purchasing an Estate for the Marquis of Wellington and his Heirs, in Consideration of the eminent and signal Services performed by the said Marquis of Wellington to His Majesty and the Public. (Repealed by Wellington Estate Act 1972 (c. 1))
Gold Currency Act 1812 (repealed)	53 Geo. 3. c. 5	22 December 1812
An Act to continue, until the Twenty fifth Day of March One thousand eight hundred and fourteen, an Act of the last Session of Parliament, (Note: Gold Currency, etc. Act 1812 (52 Geo. 3. c. 50)) for making more effectual Provision for preventing the Current Gold Coin of the Realm from being paid or accepted for a greater Value than the Current Value of such Coin; for preventing any Note or Bill of the Governor and Company of the Bank of England, or of the Governor and Company of the Bank of Ireland, from being received for any smaller Sum than the Sum therein specified; and for staying Proceedings upon any Distress by Tender of such Notes. (Repealed by Statute Law Revision Act 1873 (36 & 37 Vict. c. 91))
Insolvent Debtors Relief (England) (No. 3) Act 1812 (repealed)	53 Geo. 3. c. 6	22 December 1812
An Act to explain and amend an Act passed in the Fifty second Year of the Reign of His present Majesty, intituled "An Act for the Relief of certain Insolvent Debtors in England;" (Note: Insolvent Debtors Relief (England) (No. 2) Act 1812 (52 Geo. 3. c. 165)) and to enlarge the Powers of the same in certain cases. (Repealed by Statute Law Revision Act 1873 (36 & 37 Vict. c. 91))
Distillation from Corn Prohibition, etc. Act 1812 (repealed)	53 Geo. 3. c. 7	22 December 1812
An Act to continue, until the Thirty-first Day of December One thousand eight hundred and thirteen, an Act made in the Forty ninth Year of His present Majesty, (Note: Distillation of Spirits Act 1809 (49 Geo. 3. c. 7)) to prohibit the Distillation of Spirits from Corn or Grain in the United Kingdom, and another Act made in the Forty ninth Year of His present Majesty, (Note: Importation Act 1809 (49 Geo. 3. c. 8)) to suspend the Importation of British or Irish-made Spirits into Great Britain and Ireland respectively, and to continue the Duties on Worts or Wash made from Sugar in Great Britain, and the Duties on Spirits made from Sugar in Ireland. (Repealed by Statute Law Revision Act 1873 (36 & 37 Vict. c. 91))
Importation and Exportation (No. 3) Act 1812 (repealed)	53 Geo. 3. c. 8	22 December 1812
An Act for repealing the Duties and Drawbacks on the Importation into and Exportation from Great Britain of Spanish Red Wine, and for granting others in lieu thereof. (Repealed by Statute Law Revision Act 1861 (24 & 25 Vict. c. 101))
Duty on Malt Act 1812 (repealed)	53 Geo. 3. c. 9	22 December 1812
An Act to alter and amend an Act, of the Fifty-second Year of His present Majesty, (Note: Excise (No. 4) Act 1812 (52 Geo. 3. c. 128)) for better securing the Duties on Malt. (Repealed by Statute Law Revision Act 1861 (24 & 25 Vict. c. 101))
Duty on Rice Act 1812 (repealed)	53 Geo. 3. c. 10	22 December 1812
An Act for charging an additional Duty on Rice imported into Great Britain. (Repealed by Statute Law Revision Act 1861 (24 & 25 Vict. c. 101))
Drawback on Chocolate Act 1812 (repealed)	53 Geo. 3. c. 11	22 December 1812
An Act for allowing an additional Drawback on Chocolate exported. (Repealed by Statute Law Revision Act 1861 (24 & 25 Vict. c. 101))
Indemnity (Order in Council West Indies Importation) Act 1812 (repealed)	53 Geo. 3. c. 12	22 December 1812
An Act for indemnifying such Persons as have advised or acted under an Order in Council for allowing the Importation of certain Articles into the West Indies, and for permitting such Importation until the Thirtieth Day of June One thousand eight hundred and thirteen. (Repealed by Statute Law Revision Act 1873 (36 & 37 Vict. c. 91))
Postage (No. 2) Act 1812 (repealed)	53 Geo. 3. c. 13	22 December 1812
An Act for authorizing the Assistant Secretary to the Postmaster General to send and receive Letters and Packets free from the Duty on Postage. (Repealed by Post Office (Repeal of Laws) Act 1837 (7 Will. 4 & 1 Vict. c. 32))
Care of King's Estate During his Illness Act 1812 (repealed)	53 Geo. 3. c. 14	22 December 1812
An Act to explain so much of Two Acts, (Note: Care of King During his Illness, etc. Act 1811 (51 Geo. 3. c. 1)) (Note: Royal Household, etc. Act 1812 (52 Geo. 3. c. 8)) for regulating His Majesty's Household and other Purposes, as relates to the Powers of the Commissioners for the Care and Management of His Majesty's Real and Personal Estate. (Repealed by Statute Law Revision Act 1873 (36 & 37 Vict. c. 91))
Duties on Malt, etc. (No. 2) Act 1812 (repealed)	53 Geo. 3. c. 15	22 December 1812
An Act for continuing to His Majesty certain Duties on Malt, Sugar, Tobacco and Snuff, in Great Britain; and on Pensions, Offices and Personal Estates in England; for the Service of the Year One thousand eight hundred and thirteen. (Repealed by Statute Law Revision Act 1873 (36 & 37 Vict. c. 91))
Exchequer Bills (No. 6) Act 1812 (repealed)	53 Geo. 3. c. 16	22 December 1812
An Act for raising the Sum of Ten millions five hundred thousand Pounds, by Exchequer Bills, for the Service Great Britain for the Year One thousand eight hundred and thirteen. (Repealed by Statute Law Revision Act 1873 (36 & 37 Vict. c. 91))

=== Sources ===
- The Statutes of the United Kingdom of Great Britain and Ireland. 53 George III. 1813. Joseph Butterworth. 1813 – via Google Books.
- Journal of the House of Commons. Vol. 68. London: His Majesty's Stationery Office. pp. 3–675.
- Chronological Table of and Index to the Statutes. Vol. 1: To the End of the Session 59 Vict. Sess. 2 (1895) (13th ed.). London: Her Majesty's Stationery Office. 1896. pp. 202–206 – via Google Books.

== See also ==
- List of acts of the Parliament of the United Kingdom
