= Banavie Swing Bridge =

Bridge in Highland, Scotland

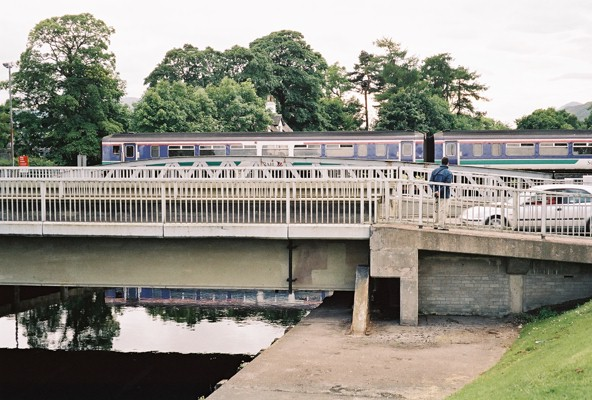
- The road bridge with the rail bridge in the background
- Coordinates: 56.844502°N 5.096698°W
- Carries: A830
- Crosses: Caledonian Canal
- Locale: Highland

Location
- Interactive map of Banavie Swing Bridge

The Banavie Swing Bridge carries the A830 road across the Caledonian Canal at Banavie.

== Design ==
The Banavie Swing Bridge crosses the canal at the bottom of Neptune's Staircase. It is adjacent to the Banavie Railway Swing Bridge which carries the West Highland Line.

== See also ==
- Banavie railway station
