= Corpach railway station =

Railway station in the Scottish Highlands

Corpach Scottish Gaelic: A' Chorpaich
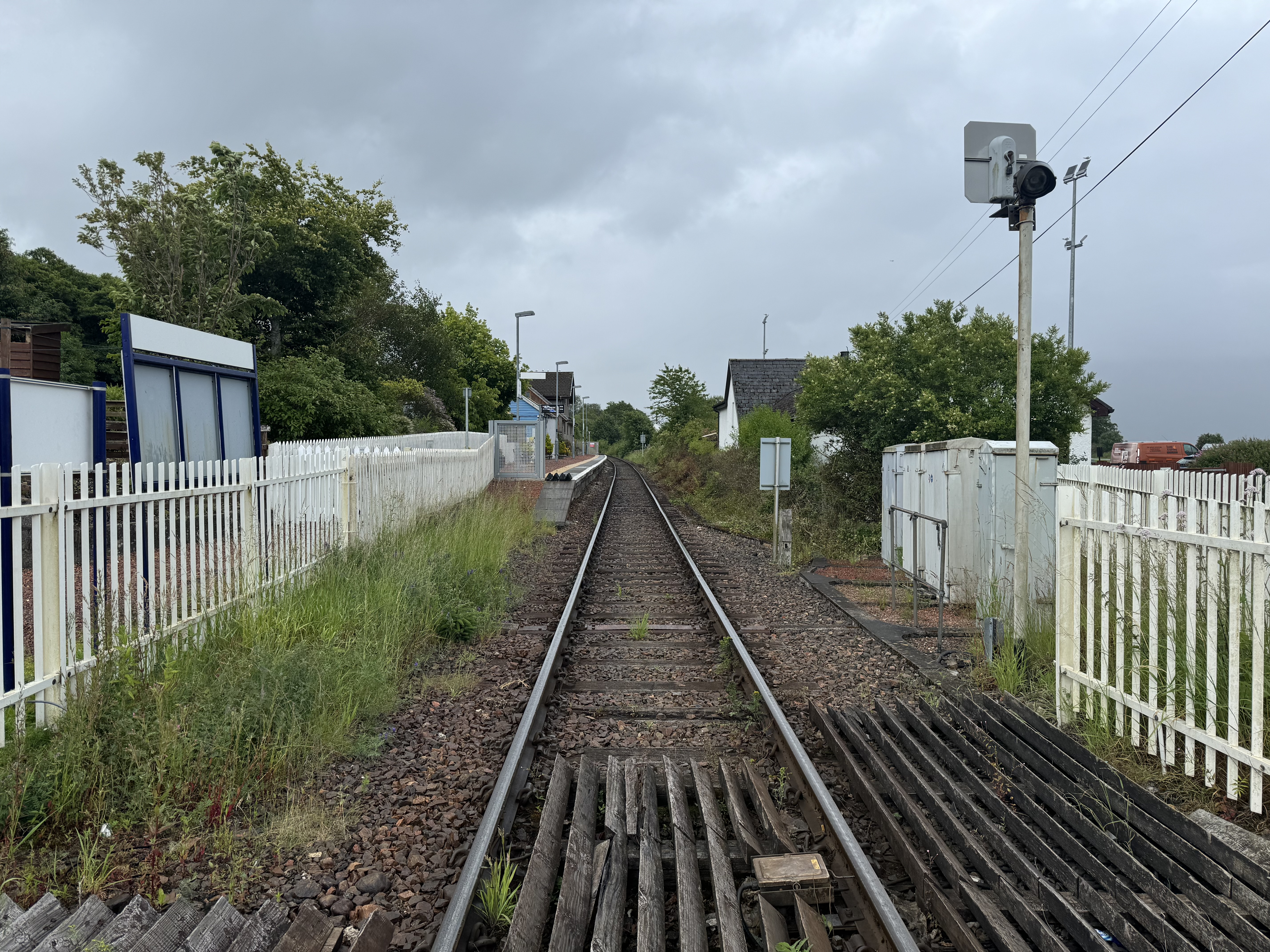
- Corpach station viewed from the level crossing, June 2024

General information
- Location: Corpach, Highland; Scotland
- Coordinates: 56.8428°N 5.1221°W
- Grid reference: NN096767
- Manager: ScotRail
- Platforms: 1

Other information
- Station code: CPA

History
- Original company: Mallaig Extension Railway of West Highland Railway
- Pre-grouping: North British Railway
- Post-grouping: LNER

Key dates
- 1 April 1901: Station opened

Passengers
- 2021/22: ▲2,210
- 2022/23: ▲2,858
- 2023/24: ▲4,042
- 2024/25: ▼3,776
- 2025/26: ▲3,998
Location
Notes
- Passenger statistics from the Office of Rail and Road

Corpach railway station is a railway station serving the village of Corpach in the Highland region of Scotland. This station is on the West Highland Line, between Banavie and Loch Eil Outward Bound, and is sited 1 mile 30 chains (2.2 km) from Banavie Junction, near Fort William. ScotRail, who manage the station, operate all services.

== History ==
Corpach station opened on 1 April 1901. Loch Eil lies immediately to the south of the station.

The station was host to a LNER camping coach from 1936 to 1939. A camping coach was also positioned here by the Scottish Region from 1961 to 1969, the coach was a Pullman camping coach until 1964 and a standard one thereafter, all camping coaches in the region were withdrawn at the end of the 1969 season.

== Facilities ==
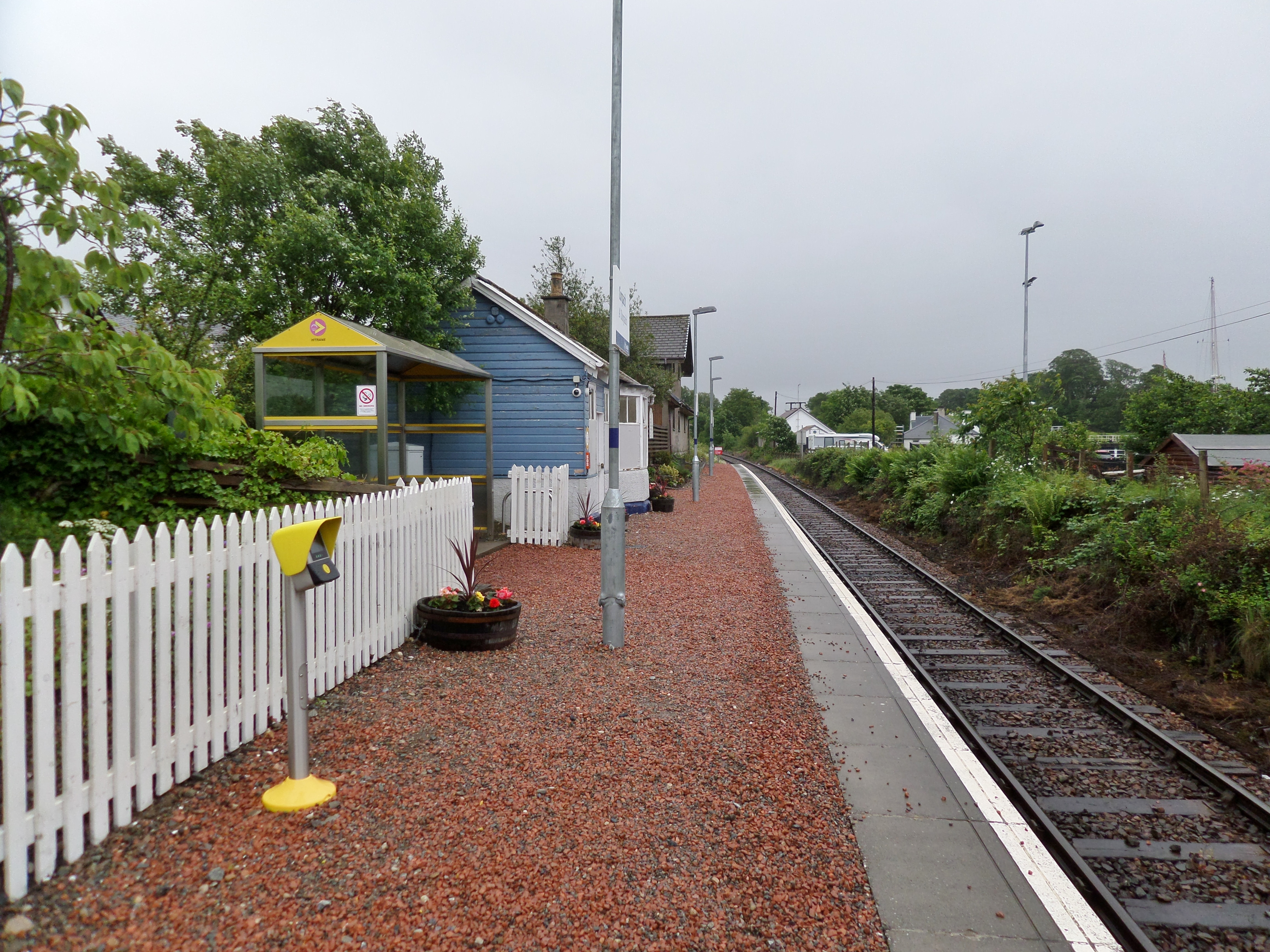
The station platform, June 2017

The single platform has a shelter, a bench and some bike racks. There is step-free access to a small car park. As there are no facilities to purchase tickets, passengers must buy one in advance, or from the guard on the train.

== Passenger volume ==
Passenger Volume at Corpach
	2004–05	2005–06	2006–07	2007–08	2008–09	2009–10	2010–11	2011–12	2012–13	2013–14	2014–15	2015–16	2016–17	2017–18	2018–19	2019–20	2020–21	2021–22	2022–23	2023–24	2024–25
Entries and exits	2,213	2,091	2,494	2,433	2,262	2,278	2,554	2,660	2,774	2,532	2,754	2,762	2,518	2,632	2,814	2,798	428	2,210	2,858	4,042	3,776

The statistics cover twelve month periods that start in April.

== Services ==
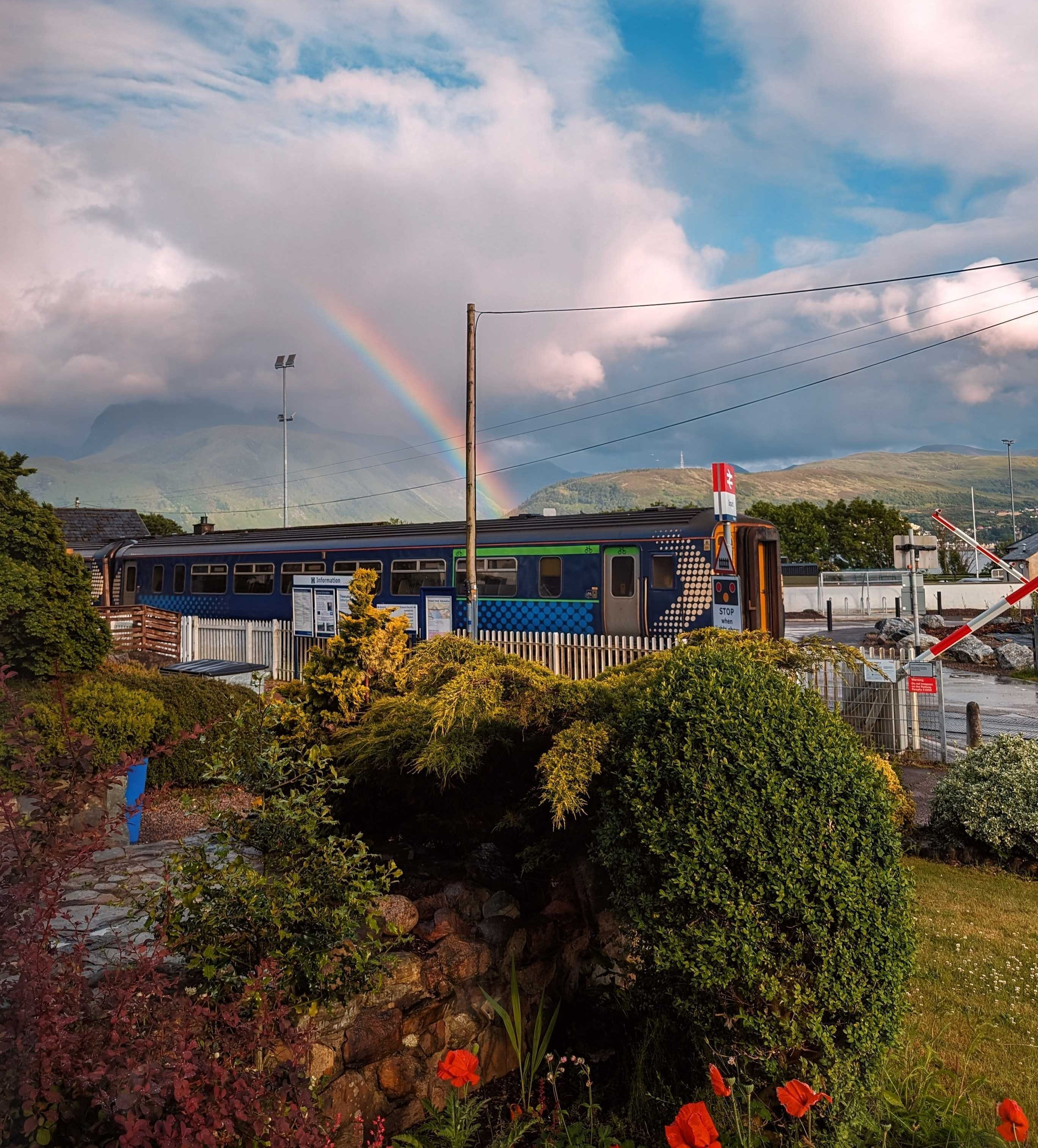
ScotRail train arriving at Corpach Station

Four services call here each way on weekdays & Saturdays, and three on Sundays. These are mostly through trains between Mallaig and Glasgow Queen Street, though one eastbound train only runs as far as Fort William.

Preceding station	National Rail	Following station
Banavie	ScotRail; West Highland Line	Loch Eil Outward Bound
	Historical railways	
Banavie; Line and Station open	North British Railway; Mallaig Extension Railway of West Highland Railway	Locheilside; Line and Station open

== Bibliography ==
- Brailsford, Martyn, ed. (December 2017) [1987]. Railway Track Diagrams 1: Scotland & Isle of Man (6th ed.). Frome: Trackmaps. ISBN 978-0-9549866-9-8.
- Butt, R. V. J. (October 1995). The Directory of Railway Stations: details every public and private passenger station, halt, platform and stopping place, past and present (1st ed.). Sparkford: Patrick Stephens Ltd. ISBN 978-1-85260-508-7. OCLC 60251199. OL 11956311M.
- McRae, Andrew (1997). British Railway Camping Coach Holidays: The 1930s & British Railways (London Midland Region). Vol. Scenes from the Past: 30 (Part One). Foxline. p. 11. ISBN 1-870119-48-7.
- McRae, Andrew (1998). British Railways Camping Coach Holidays: A Tour of Britain in the 1950s and 1960s. Vol. Scenes from the Past: 30 (Part Two). Foxline. ISBN 1-870119-53-3.
- Jowett, Alan (March 1989). Jowett's Railway Atlas of Great Britain and Ireland: From Pre-Grouping to the Present Day (1st ed.). Sparkford: Patrick Stephens Ltd. ISBN 978-1-85260-086-0. OCLC 22311137.
- Jowett, Alan (2000). Jowett's Nationalised Railway Atlas (1st ed.). Penryn, Cornwall: Atlantic Transport Publishers. ISBN 978-0-906899-99-1. OCLC 228266687.
