= Loch Eil Outward Bound railway station =

Railway station in the Highlands of Scotland

Loch Eil Outward Bound Scottish Gaelic: Spòrs A-Muigh Loch Iall
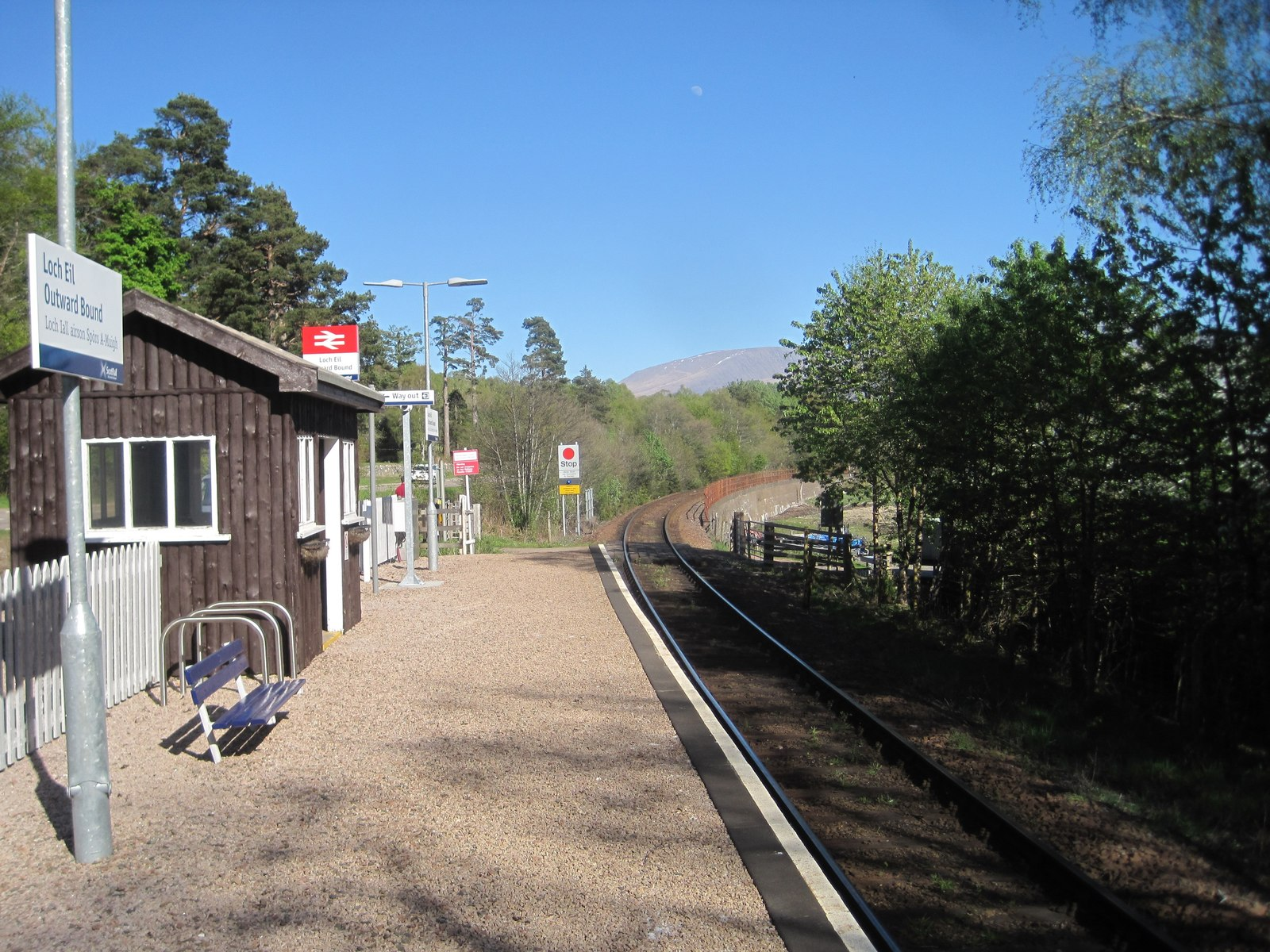

General information
- Location: Loch Eil, Highland; Scotland
- Coordinates: 56.8554°N 5.1929°W
- Grid reference: NN054783
- Manager: ScotRail
- Platforms: 1

Other information
- Station code: LHE

Key dates
- 6 May 1985: Station opened

Passengers
- 2021/22: ▲1,100
- 2022/23: ▲1,888
- 2023/24: ▲3,534
- 2024/25: ▲5,294
- 2025/26: ▲8,086
Location
Notes
- Passenger statistics from the Office of Rail and Road

Loch Eil Outward Bound railway station is a railway station on the northern bank of Loch Eil in the Highland region of Scotland. This station is on the West Highland Line, between Corpach and Locheilside, sited 4 miles 20 chains (6.8 km) from Banavie Junction, near Fort William. ScotRail, who manage the station, operate all services.

== History ==
This station opened by British Rail on 6 May 1985. Its name refers to the nearby Outward Bound centre that the station was built to serve.

== Facilities ==
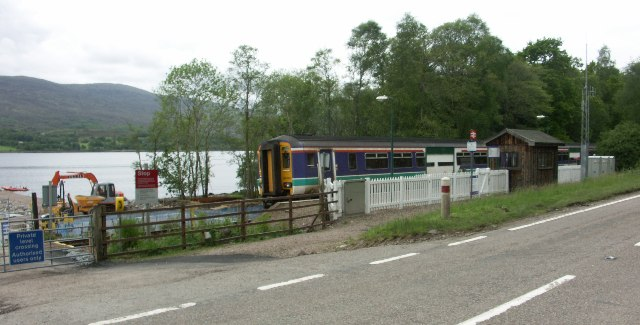
The station viewed from the road

The station has a single platform equipped with a shelter, a bench, a help point and some bike racks, as well as a small car park. The station has step-free access from the car park, as well as to the waterfront at Loch Eil. As there are no facilities to purchase tickets, passengers must buy one in advance, or from the guard on the train.

== Passenger volume ==
Passenger Volume at Loch Eil Outward Bound
	2004–05	2005–06	2006–07	2007–08	2008–09	2009–10	2010–11	2011–12	2012–13	2013–14	2014–15	2015–16	2016–17	2017–18	2018–19	2019–20	2020–21	2021–22	2022–23	2023–24	2024–25
Entries and exits	507	475	637	913	860	548	812	722	578	522	632	478	572	548	554	748	142	1,100	1,888	3,534	5,294

The statistics cover twelve month periods that start in April.

== Services ==
From Monday to Saturday, three trains stop heading to Glasgow Queen Street (the other terminates at Fort William), and four trains stop on the way to Mallaig. On Sundays, this is reduced to three trains each way (again, one of the eastbound services terminates at Fort William).

Preceding station	National Rail	Following station
Corpach	ScotRail; West Highland Line	Locheilside

== Bibliography ==
- Quick, Michael (2022). Railway Passenger Stations in Great Britain: A Chronology (PDF) (5th ed.). London: Railway and Canal Historical Society.
