= Banavie Railway Swing Bridge =

Bridge in Highland, Scotland

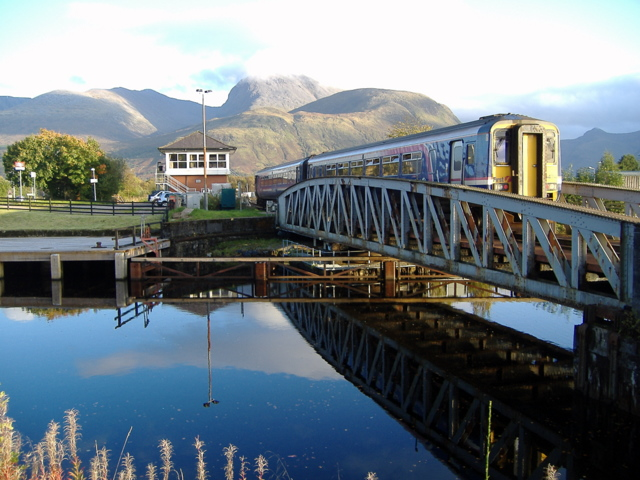
- Coordinates: 56.844273°N 5.097086°W
- Carries: West Highland Line
- Crosses: Caledonian Canal

History
- Designer: Alex Findlay & Co.
- Opened: 1901

Listed Building – Category B
- Official name: Caledonian Canal, Banavie, Swing Railway Bridge Over Caledonian Canal
- Designated: 28 May 1985
- Reference no.: LB7079

Location
- Interactive map of Banavie Railway Swing Bridge

The Banavie Railway Swing Bridge carries the West Highland Line across the Caledonian Canal at Banavie.

== History ==
Construction of the extension from Mallaig Extension Railway began in January 1887, and the line opened on 1 April 1901.

The bridge was manufactured by Alex Findlay & Co. of Motherwell.

== Design ==
The bridge is an asymmetric bow truss, with more reinforcement at the end where it is held.

Its operation is fully automated and is controlled by Network Rail staff in the signal box located only a few yards away. It is adjacent to the Banavie Swing Bridge, which carries the A830 road across the canal.

There is a speed limit of 5 mph for trains passing over the bridge.

== See also ==
- Banavie railway station
- List of bridges in Scotland
