= Locheilside railway station =

Railway station in the Scottish Highlands

Locheilside Scottish Gaelic: Taobh Loch Iall
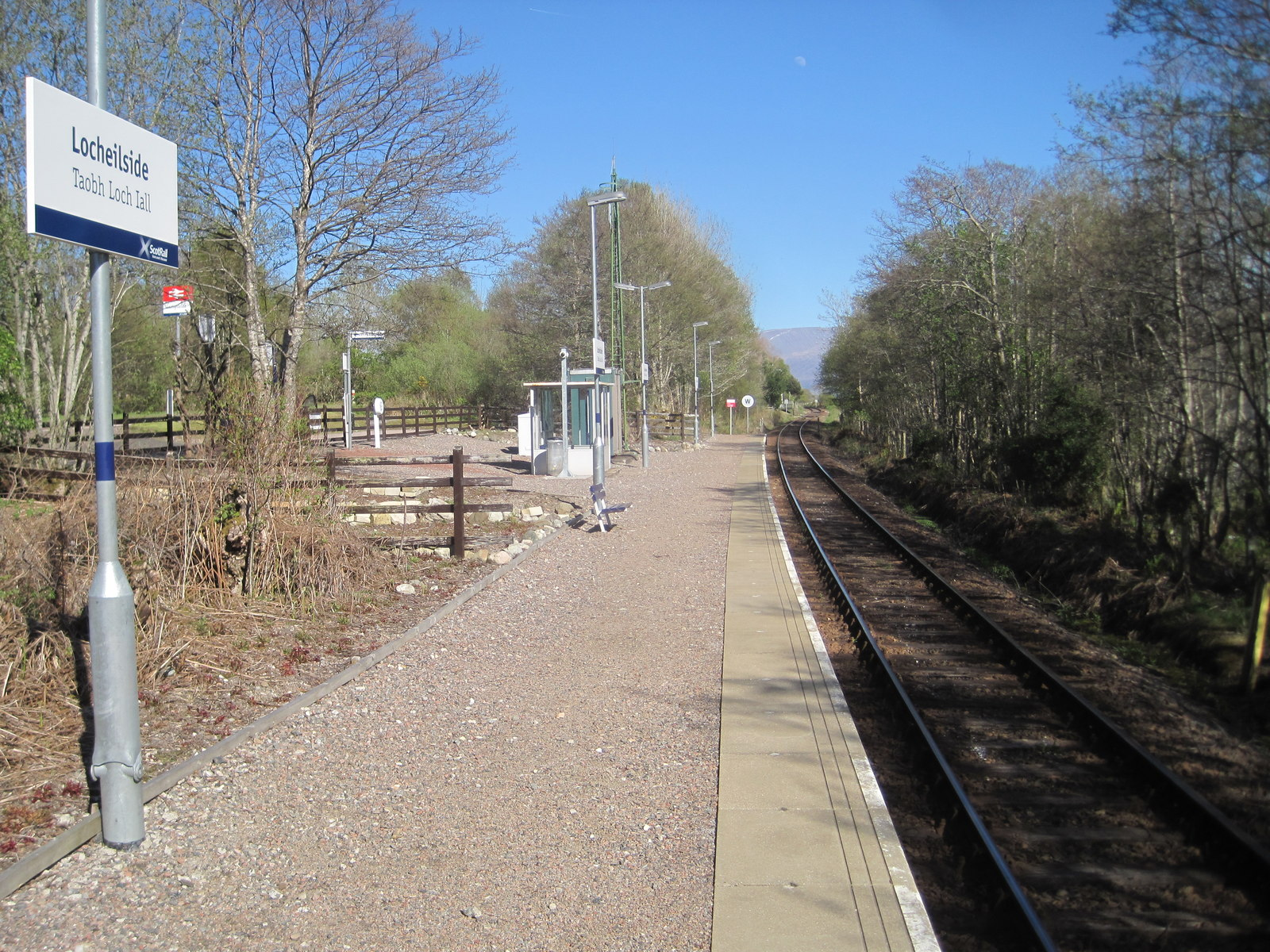
- The station seen in 2017

General information
- Location: Loch Eil, Highland; Scotland
- Coordinates: 56.8560°N 5.2903°W
- Grid reference: NM994786
- Manager: ScotRail
- Platforms: 1

Other information
- Station code: LCS

History
- Original company: Mallaig Extension Railway of West Highland Railway
- Pre-grouping: North British Railway
- Post-grouping: LNER

Key dates
- 1 April 1901: Station opened

Passengers
- 2021/22: ▲378
- 2022/23: ▲462
- 2023/24: ▼418
- 2024/25: ▲462
- 2025/26: ▼420
Location
Notes
- Passenger statistics from the Office of Rail and Road

Locheilside railway station is a railway station on the northern shore of Loch Eil in the Highland Council Area of Scotland. This station is on the West Highland Line, between Glenfinnan and Loch Eil Outward Bound, located 7 miles 79 chains (12.9 km) from the former Banavie Junction near Fort William. ScotRail, who manage the station, operate all services.

== History ==
Locheilside station opened on 1 April 1901.

The station was host to a LNER camping coach from 1936 to 1939.

== Facilities ==
The station has a shelter, a bench, a help point and cycle racks, adjacent to a small car park. The station has step-free access. As there are no facilities to purchase tickets, passengers must buy one in advance, or from the guard on the train.

== Passenger volume ==
Passenger Volume at Locheilside
| | 2004–05 | 2005–06 | 2006–07 | 2007–08 | 2008–09 | 2009–10 | 2010–11 | 2011–12 | 2012–13 | 2013–14 | 2014–15 | 2015–16 | 2016–17 | 2017–18 | 2018–19 | 2019–20 | 2020–21 | 2021–22 | 2022–23 | 2023–24 | 2024–25 |
|---|---|---|---|---|---|---|---|---|---|---|---|---|---|---|---|---|---|---|---|---|---|
| Entries and exits | 355 | 255 | 309 | 334 | 324 | 268 | 372 | 388 | 488 | 588 | 530 | 492 | 372 | 300 | 396 | 508 | 84 | 378 | 462 | 418 | 462 |

The statistics cover twelve month periods that start in April.

== Services ==
Four services call on request here each way on weekdays & Saturdays, and three each way on Sundays. These are mostly through trains between Mallaig and Glasgow Queen Street, though one each way only runs between Mallaig and Fort William.

| Preceding station | National Rail | Following station |
|---|---|---|
| Loch Eil Outward Bound | ScotRail; West Highland Line | Glenfinnan |
| | Historical railways | |
| Corpach; Line and Station open | North British Railway; Mallaig Extension Railway of West Highland Railway | Glenfinnan; Line and Station open |

== Bibliography ==
- Brailsford, Martyn, ed. (December 2017) [1987]. Railway Track Diagrams 1: Scotland & Isle of Man (6th ed.). Frome: Trackmaps. ISBN 978-0-9549866-9-8.
- Butt, R. V. J. (October 1995). The Directory of Railway Stations: details every public and private passenger station, halt, platform and stopping place, past and present (1st ed.). Sparkford: Patrick Stephens Ltd. ISBN 978-1-85260-508-7. OCLC 60251199. OL 11956311M.
- McRae, Andrew (1997). British Railway Camping Coach Holidays: The 1930s & British Railways (London Midland Region). Vol. Scenes from the Past: 30 (Part One). Foxline. ISBN 1-870119-48-7.
- Jowett, Alan (March 1989). Jowett's Railway Atlas of Great Britain and Ireland: From Pre-Grouping to the Present Day (1st ed.). Sparkford: Patrick Stephens Ltd. ISBN 978-1-85260-086-0. OCLC 22311137.
- Jowett, Alan (2000). Jowett's Nationalised Railway Atlas (1st ed.). Penryn, Cornwall: Atlantic Transport Publishers. ISBN 978-0-906899-99-1. OCLC 228266687.
