= Banavie Pier railway station =

Disused railway station in Banavie, Highland

Banavie Pier
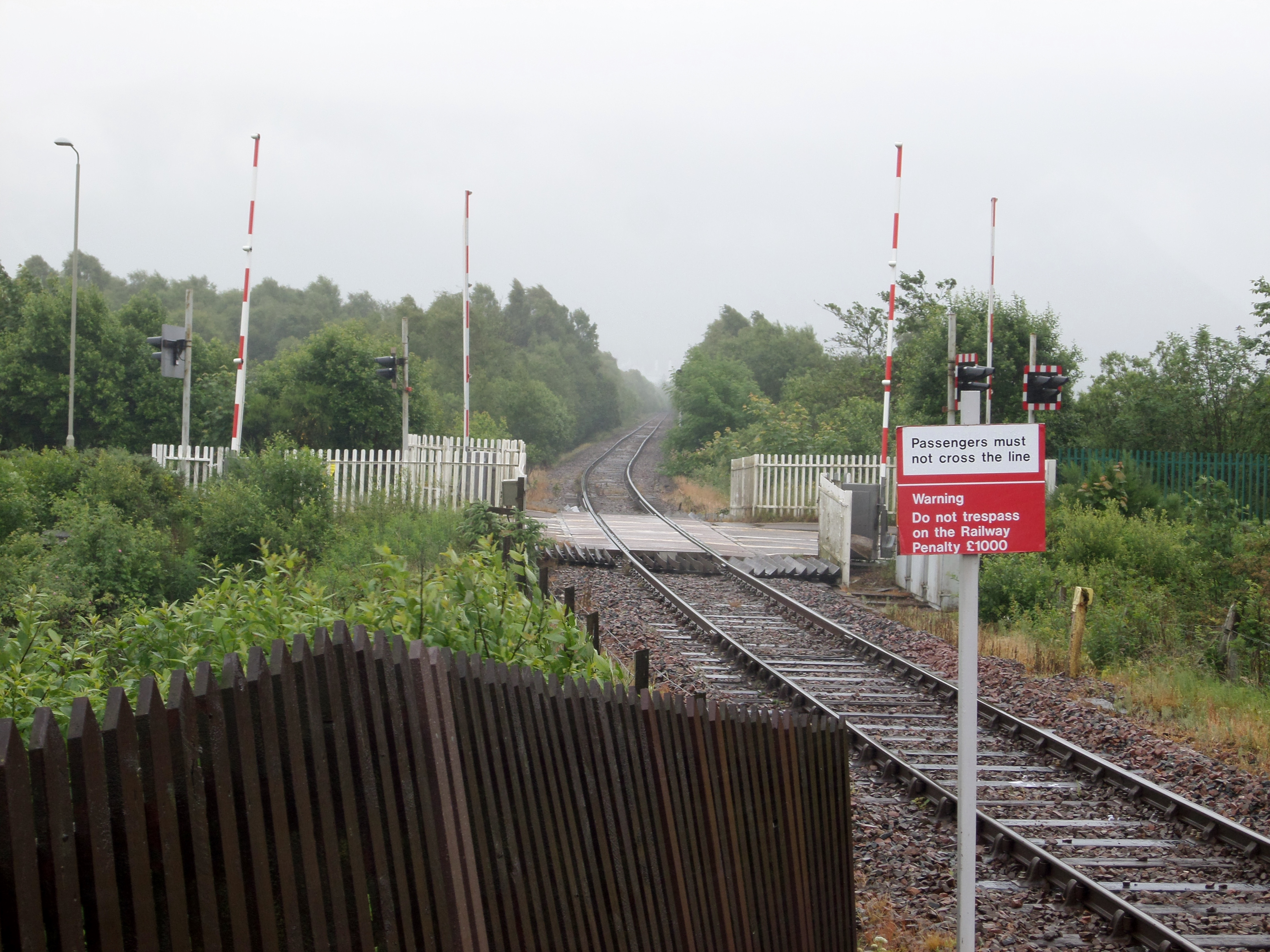
- The site of the 1901 Banavie Junction

General information
- Location: Banavie, Highland; Scotland
- Coordinates: 56.84490°N 5.09487°W
- Grid reference: NN 116 771
- Platforms: 1

Other information
- Status: Disused

History
- Original company: West Highland Railway
- Pre-grouping: North British Railway
- Post-grouping: London and North Eastern Railway

Key dates
- 1 June 1895: Opened
- 1 April 1901: Re-named Banavie Pier
- 4 September 1939: Closed to passengers
- 6 August 1951: Closed to freight
Location

Banavie Pier railway station was the terminus of a short branch and was at first known as Banvie, opened by the North British Railway in 1895. The station's location was just above the impressive flight of locks on the Caledonian Canal known as "Neptune's Staircase", Banavie, Highland council area, Scotland.

A new station named Banavie was opened on the Mallaig Extension Railway in 1901, still operational and now the location of the radio electronic token block (RETB) control centre for the West Highland Railway system throughout, except for the Fort William station area. The original pier station became "Banavie Pier" and served the paddle steamers on the canal that ran to Inverness and the location avoided the time-consuming passage through the eight locks of the 'staircase'.

== History ==
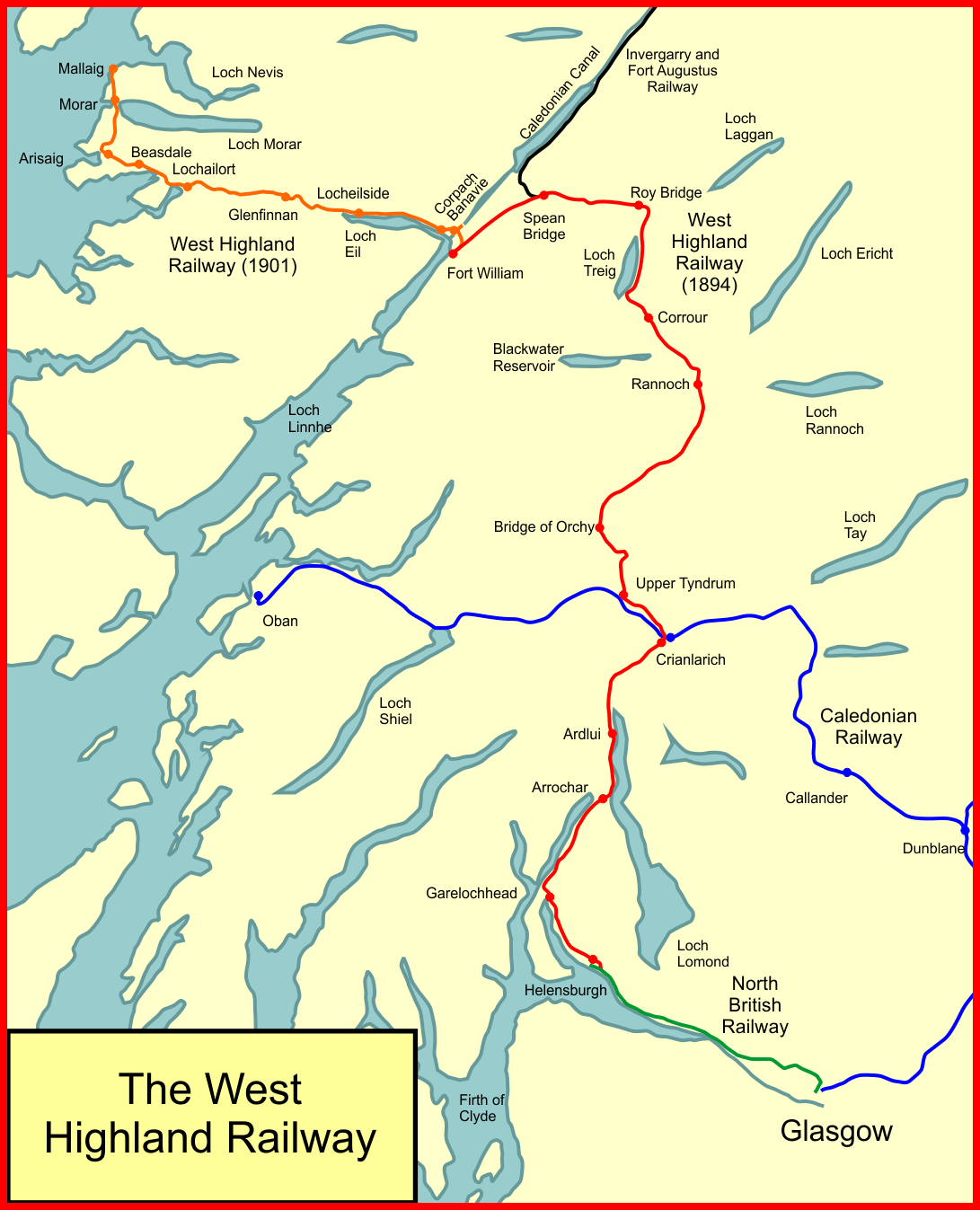
System map of the West Highland Railway

The West Highland Railway opened the Fort William line to passengers on 7 August 1894; operated by the North British Railway, until in 1923 it became part of the London and North Eastern Railway. In 1948 the line became part of the Scottish Region of British Railways following nationalisation. The "Banavie Extension" was opened by the North British Railway in 1895.

The opening of the pier station resulted in a considerable increase in the passenger traffic on the Caledonian Canal, the West Highland Railway having their own wharf above the locks. The branch was a useful link between steamers arriving at Fort William from Oban who wished to travel on the Caledonian Canal. Some freight traffic for the branch was generated from the canal in carrying grain for the distilleries that had been grown in the Black Isle and Moray and had been transported to Banavie from Inverness.

The official closure date for the passenger service was 4 September 1939 however the last train actually ran on 15 September. Freight services ceased on 6 August 1951.

=== The Banavie Junctions ===
The first "Banavie Junction" was located on the West Highland Railway around one mile east of Fort William railway station and was opened on 1 June 1895 when the branch line to Banavie Pier was opened. When the Mallaig Extension Railway opened on 30 March 1901 the junction was renamed "Mallaig Junction" however a second 'new' "Banavie Junction" then existed off the Mallaig line near the new Banavie railway station, going out of use in 1951. To eliminate confusion in radio communication "Mallaig Junction" was renamed "Fort William Junction" on 27 March 1988.

== Infrastructure ==
The station building was constructed in the standard "chalet" style. The 1899 OS map records the station and goods yard next to the canal and shows a signal box at the then "Banavie Junction". The station building and stationmaster's house stood on the northern side of the line and the goods yard with a single siding and a weighing machine on the eastern side. A passing loop was present at the station and a siding ran off northwards parallel to the canal and a spur ran back to lie close to the steamers landing stage.

The station building and stationmaster's house survive as private dwellings as does the platform. The stationmaster's house had been set back from the platform so as not to offend First Class passengers making their way to the steamers. A crane was positioned at the canal side to serve the railway goods traffic in WWII.

The Railway Inspectorate noted that the branch had been laid by the contractors Lucas and Aird using used rails.

== Services ==
Trains for Glasgow were advertised as terminating and originating at Banavie when the branch first opened. After the Mallaig Extension was opened the services to Banavie Pier were adapted to serve the steamer traffic on the Caledonian Canal with a summer service extending into early autumn and trains running every day at times, although a pattern was established of one train a day on Mondays, Wednesdays and Fridays to Banavie Pier from Fort William and one on Tuesdays, Thursdays and Saturdays from Banavie Pier to Fort William.

The line had no signalling and was worked on a one engine in steam basis by staff and key. A temporary wooden shelter had been obtained for the signalman at the junction.

== See also ==
- Fersit Halt
- Glen Douglas Siding
- Glen Falloch Halt
- Gorton Station
- Lech-a-Vuie Platform
