= BNV =

BNV may refer to:

- Bloc Nacionalista Valencià, (Valencian Nationalist Bloc)
- Banavie railway station (National Rail station code BNV)
- Bicycle Network (formerly Bicycle Network Victoria).
- Bund Neues Vaterland (New Fatherland League, which later became the German League for Human Rights)
- Buona Vista MRT station (MRT station abbreviation BNV)
