= Banavie =

Coordinates: 56.846°N 5.098°W

Banavie: Scottish Gaelic: Banbhaidh
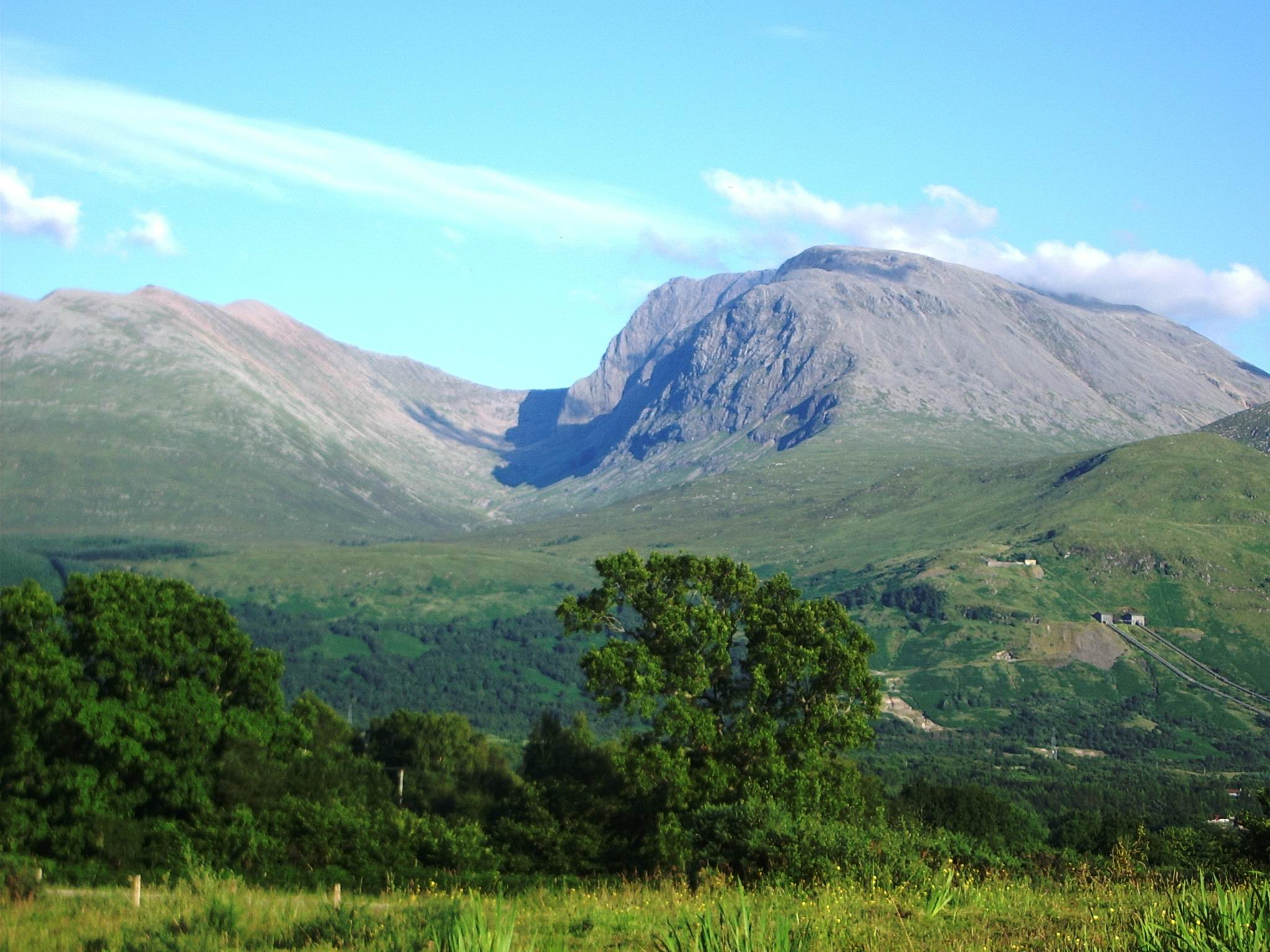
- Ben Nevis (Beinn Nibheis) viewed from Banavie

- Location within the Lochaber area
- Population: 1,350 (2020)
- OS grid reference: NN111770
- Council area: Highland
- Country: Scotland
- Sovereign state: United Kingdom
- Post town: Fort William
- Postcode district: PH33 7
- Police: Scotland
- Fire: Scottish
- Ambulance: Scottish

Banavie (/ˈbænəvi/; Scottish Gaelic: Banbhaidh) is a small settlement near Fort William in the Highland Council Area of Scotland. One of the closest villages to Ben Nevis, it is about 4 kilometres (2 1/2 miles) northeast of Fort William town centre, next to Caol and Corpach.

It has been suggested that Banavie is one of the possible birth places of Saint Patrick. One theory is that Patrick was the son of a Roman tax collector and born at Banavie around AD 389. His family had come with the Romans who had invaded the West Highlands and Islands. The 19th century work 'History of Celtic Placenames' by William J. Watson notes: "St Patrick was born at Banna-venta, an early town south of the Grampians." A similar placename, Bannavem Taburniae, is mentioned in one of the only two known authenticated letters by St Patrick. Professor Watson thought that the name Banavie meant Pig Place or possibly a pig related stream name; Banbh being an old Irish word for pig.

It was formerly where the Camanachd Association, the ruling body of shinty was based, but this has now been moved to Inverness.

Banavie railway station is on the highly scenic West Highland Line. The signalling centre at the station uses radio communications to control train movements on the West Highland Line. It covers a big area from Fort William to Mallaig and from Fort William to Helensburgh including the branch line to Oban.

The Caledonian Canal passes through Banavie, before ascending Neptune's Staircase, the longest staircase lock in the United Kingdom. The canal is crossed by two swing bridges, one carrying the railway and the other the A835 road. Banavie Pier railway station served the canal paddle steamers until 1939. The station building, platform and station master's house still survive as private dwellings.

The village has a number of bed and breakfast, guesthouses, self-catering and hotels.

The scenery around Banavie is exceptional with Ben Nevis dominant in the skyline. The Caledonian Canal passes through the village at Neptune's Staircase, which is a set of lock gates that raise vessels into Banavie upper canal area which has a long pontoon for visiting boats and yachts.

The Great Glen Way long distance path also passes through the village, mostly following the canal tow-path to Gairlochy.

== Notable people ==
Besides St Patrick, Mary Earle (then Mary Cameron) was born here in 1929. She rose to be Professor of Food Technology in New Zealand but she never forgot her links to Scotland.

== See also ==
- Banavie railway station
- Banavie Railway Swing Bridge
- Banavie Swing Bridge
