= Battle of Corpach =

Scottish clan battle in which the Clan Cameron routed the Clan Maclean

Coordinates: 56°50′29″N 5°7′0″W

- Part of the Scottish clan wars
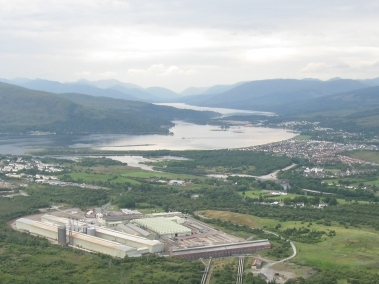
- Corpach is the settlement on the right
Date	c. 1470
Location	Corpach, Fort William, Scotland grid reference NN1076
Result	Cameron victory

Belligerents
Clan Cameron	Clan MacLean

Commanders and leaders
Allan Cameron	Hector MacLean

Strength
Unknown	Unknown

Casualties and losses
Unknown	Unknown

The Battle of Corpach was a Scottish clan battle in which the Clan Cameron routed the Clan Maclean. It took place around 1470 at Corpach, just north of Fort William on the west coast of Scotland.

== Background ==
After Alexander, Lord of the Isles was released from Tantallon Castle in 1431, he had awarded the Cameron lands around Fort William to the Macleans under John Garve Maclean of Coll, as punishment for the Camerons deserting him in 1429, before the battle of Lochaber.

== Battle ==
The Clan Maclean invaded and were confronted by the Camerons at Corpach. It is recorded that a young MacLean chieftain, Ewen or John Abrach, the son of John Garve Maclean of Coll was killed. The Camerons were led in the battle by their chief Ailean nan Creach, and completely routed the Maclean forces, retaining their lands. However the Macleans would attempt to dislodge them throughout the coming years.

== See also ==
- Battle of Inverlochy (1431) - nearby battle that had seen the Donalds heavily defeat the royalist forces of Mar and Caithness.
