= Corpach =

Coordinates: 56.843°N 5.123°W

Corpach: Scottish Gaelic: A' Chorpaich
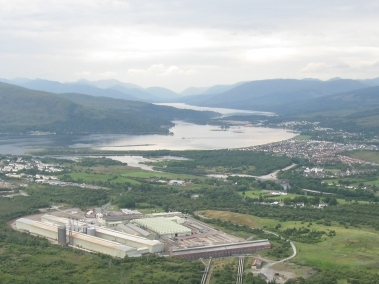
- Corpach is on the right of this photo looking west up Loch Eil

- Location within the Lochaber area
- OS grid reference: NN095767
  - Edinburgh: 140 mi (230 km) SE
  - London: 500 mi (800 km) SSE
- Council area: Highland
- Country: Scotland
- Sovereign state: United Kingdom
- Post town: FORT WILLIAM
- Postcode district: PH33
- Dialling code: 01397
- Police: Scotland
- Fire: Scottish
- Ambulance: Scottish
- UK Parliament: Ross, Skye and Lochaber
- Scottish Parliament: Skye, Lochaber and Badenoch

Corpach (Scottish Gaelic: A' Chorpaich) is a large village north of Fort William, in the Scottish Highlands. The canal lock at Corpach Basin on Loch Linnhe, east of the narrows leading to Loch Eil, is the western sea entrance of the Caledonian Canal. It is a natural harbour, unlike Fort William.

== History ==
The name Corpach is reputedly based on the Gaelic for "field of corpses", so called because it was perhaps used as a resting place when taking coffins of chieftains on the way to burial on Iona.

The Battle of Corpach in about 1470 saw Clan Cameron rout Clan MacLean.

In World War I, the United States Navy had a base at Corpach as part of the laying of the North Sea Mine Barrage. Naval mines were shipped into Corpach from the United States, and were then sent to the Inverness base along the Caledonian Canal, which joins Loch Linnhe at Corpach.

During World War II, Corpach was the engineering base for HMS St Christopher which was a training base for Royal Navy Coastal Forces. Some of the buildings are still in use. There was a large camp at Annat, which became Annat Village after the War consisting of some 200 houses similar to Prefab houses but of stronger cement construction and flat-roofed; some of the cement remains can still be seen about the area. It is now used as a caravan site.
