= Banavie railway station =

Railway station in the Highlands of Scotland

Banavie Scottish Gaelic: Banbhaidh
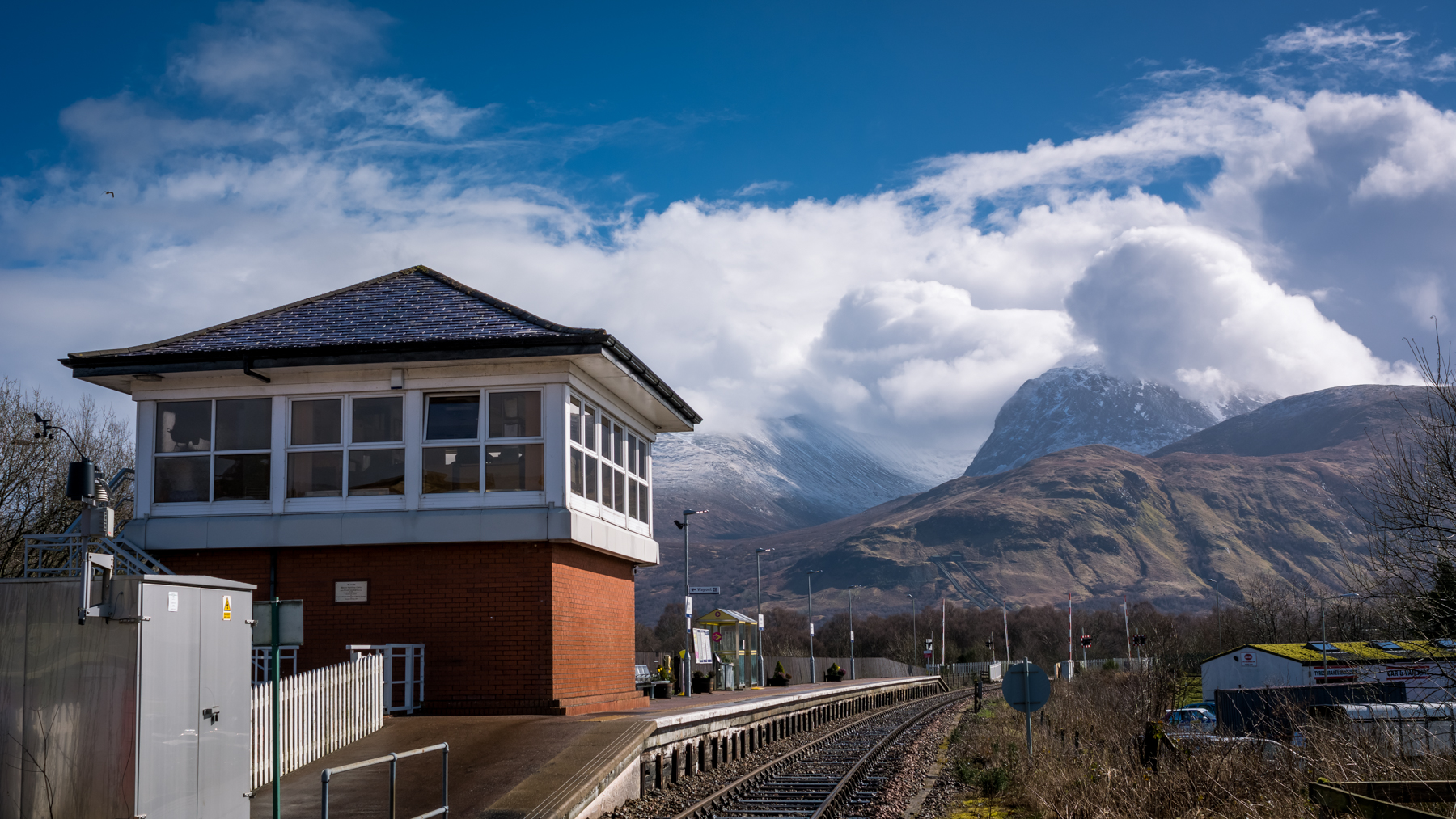
- The platform at Banavie with Ben Nevis's peak covered in cloud and snow.

General information
- Location: Banavie, Highland; Scotland
- Coordinates: 56.8439°N 5.0960°W
- Grid reference: NN112767
- Manager: ScotRail
- Platforms: 1

Other information
- Station code: BNV

History
- Original company: Mallaig Extension Railway of West Highland Railway
- Pre-grouping: North British Railway
- Post-grouping: LNER

Key dates
- 1 April 1901: Station opened

Passengers
- 2021/22: ▲4,228
- 2022/23: ▲4,284
- 2023/24: ▲6,798
- 2024/25: ▼6,796
- 2025/26: ▲7,094
Location
Notes
- Passenger statistics from the Office of Rail and Road

Banavie railway station is a railway station on the West Highland Line serving the village of Banavie, although it is much closer to Caol, Scotland. It is sited between Corpach and Fort William, 22 chains (440 m) from Banavie Junction, just north of Fort William. To continue on to the next station at Corpach, trains must pass over the Caledonian Canal at Neptune's Staircase, a popular tourist attraction. ScotRail provide all services at, and manage, the station.

== History ==
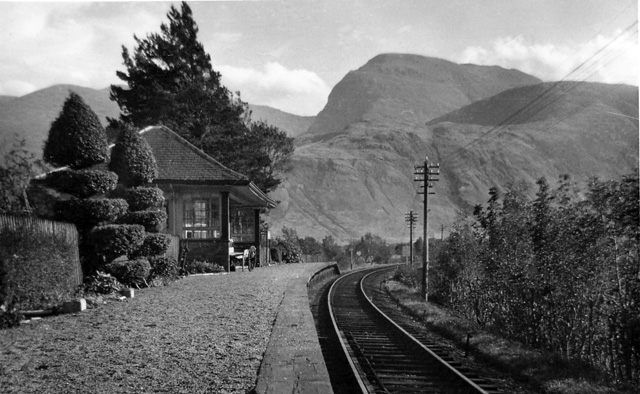
The station in 1961

Banavie station opened along with the Mallaig Extension Railway on 1 April 1901. It comprises a single platform on the north side of the line. The station was host to a LNER camping coach from 1936 to 1939.

Another station named "Banavie" existed above the Neptune's Staircase flight of locks, which was opened in 1895. It was later renamed Banavie Pier railway station and closed fully to passengers in September 1939.

== Facilities ==
The single platform is equipped with a shelter, a bench and some bike racks, the latter located in the car park. There is step-free access to the car park. As there are no facilities to purchase tickets, passengers must buy one in advance, or from the guard on the train.

== Passenger volume ==
Passenger Volume at Banavie
	2004–05	2005–06	2006–07	2007–08	2008–09	2009–10	2010–11	2011–12	2012–13	2013–14	2014–15	2015–16	2016–17	2017–18	2018–19	2019–20	2020–21	2021–22	2022–23	2023–24	2024–25
Entries and exits	2,514	2,688	3,066	4,037	4,208	4,478	5,056	5,328	6,542	5,672	5,918	6,344	5,852	6,468	6,462	6,260	1,056	4,228	4,284	6,798	6,796

The statistics cover twelve month periods that start in April.

== Services ==
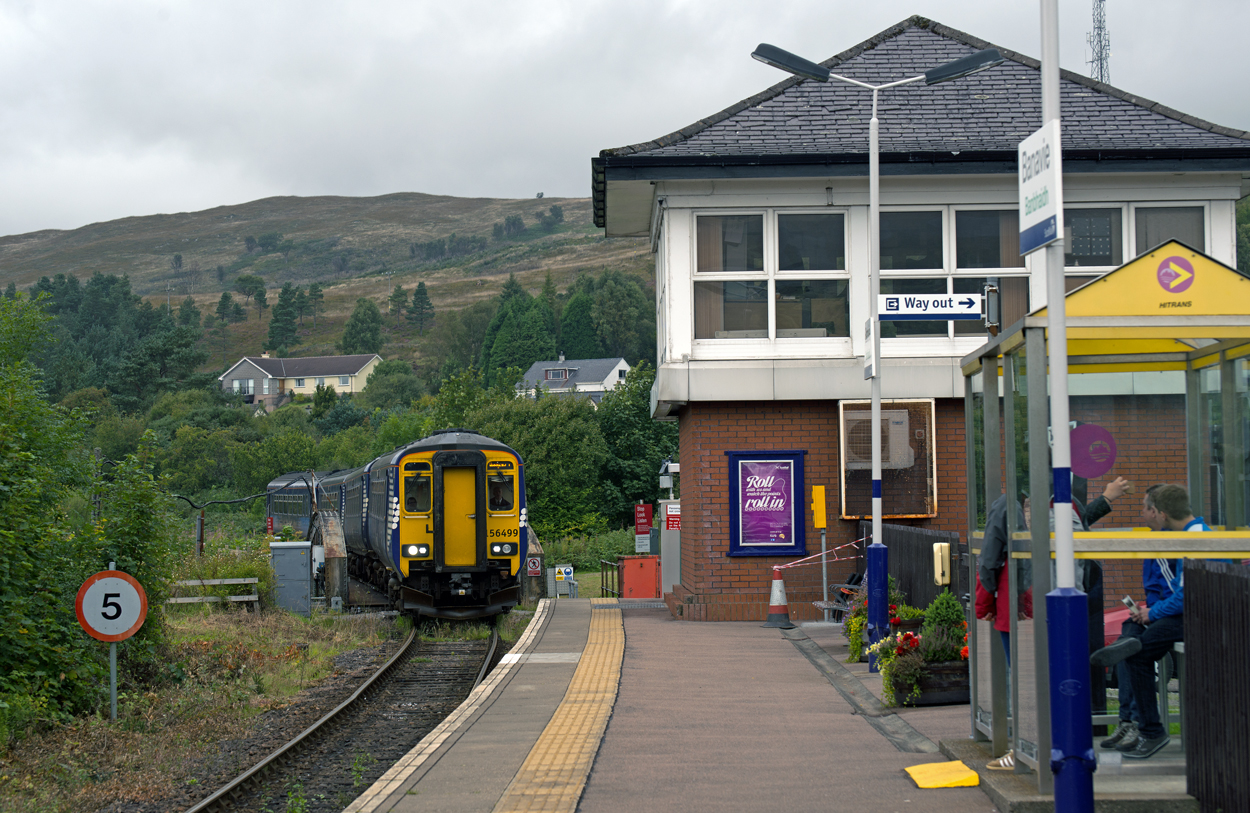
A train approaching the station, seen in 2014

On weekdays and Saturdays, four trains a day call here in either direction. Travelling eastbound, three of them are through trains to Glasgow Queen Street, whilst the other terminates at Fort William and connects with the Caledonian Sleeper service to London Euston.

Preceding station	National Rail	Following station
Fort William	ScotRail; West Highland Line	Corpach
	Historical railways	
Fort William; Line and Station open	North British Railway; Mallaig Extension Railway of West Highland Railway	Corpach; Line and Station open

== See also ==
- Banavie
- Banavie Railway Swing Bridge
- Banavie Swing Bridge

== Bibliography ==
- Brailsford, Martyn, ed. (December 2017) [1987]. Railway Track Diagrams 1: Scotland & Isle of Man (6th ed.). Frome: Trackmaps. ISBN 978-0-9549866-9-8.
- Butt, R. V. J. (October 1995). The Directory of Railway Stations: details every public and private passenger station, halt, platform and stopping place, past and present (1st ed.). Sparkford: Patrick Stephens Ltd. ISBN 978-1-85260-508-7. OCLC 60251199. OL 11956311M.
- McRae, Andrew (1997). British Railway Camping Coach Holidays: The 1930s & British Railways (London Midland Region). Vol. Scenes from the Past: 30 (Part One). Foxline. ISBN 1-870119-48-7.
- Jowett, Alan (March 1989). Jowett's Railway Atlas of Great Britain and Ireland: From Pre-Grouping to the Present Day (1st ed.). Sparkford: Patrick Stephens Ltd. ISBN 978-1-85260-086-0. OCLC 22311137.
- Jowett, Alan (2000). Jowett's Nationalised Railway Atlas (1st ed.). Penryn, Cornwall: Atlantic Transport Publishers. ISBN 978-0-906899-99-1. OCLC 228266687.
- Lindsay, Jean (1968). The Canals of Scotland. Newton Abbott: David & Charles. ISBN 0-7153-4240-1.
- Quick, Michael (2023) [2001]. Railway passenger stations in Great Britain: a chronology (PDF). version 5.05. Railway & Canal Historical Society.
