= Caledonian Canal =

Artificial waterway in Scotland

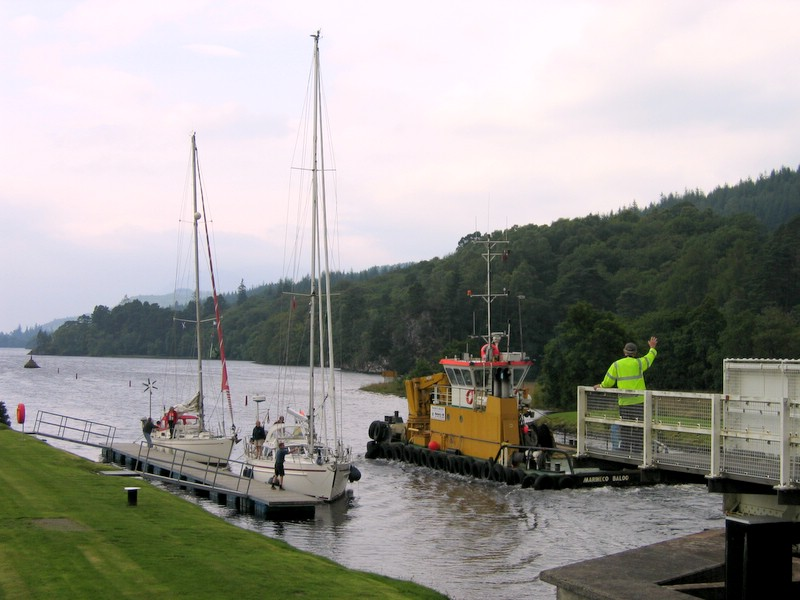
- Swing bridge over the Caledonian Canal
- Interactive map of Caledonian Canal

Specifications
- Maximum boat length: 45.72 metres (150 ft)
- Maximum boat beam: 10.67 metres (35 ft)
- Maximum boat draft: 4.1 metres (15.5 ft)
- Maximum boat air draft: 35 metres (115 ft)
- Locks: 29
- Status: Navigable
- Navigation authority: Scottish Canals

History
- Original owner: Caledonian Canal Commissioners
- Principal engineer: Thomas Telford
- Date of act: 1803
- Date completed: 1822

Geography
- Start point: Inverness
- End point: Fort William

The Caledonian Canal connects the Scottish east coast at Inverness with the west coast at Corpach near Fort William in Scotland. The canal was constructed in the early nineteenth century by Scottish engineer Thomas Telford.

== Route ==
The canal runs some 60 miles (100 kilometres) from northeast to southwest and reaches 106 feet (32 metres) above sea level. Only one third of the entire length is man-made, the rest being formed by Loch Dochfour, Loch Ness, Loch Oich, and Loch Lochy. These lochs are located in the Great Glen, on a geological fault in the Earth's crust. There are 29 locks (including eight at Neptune's Staircase, Banavie), four aqueducts and 11 bridges in the course of the canal.

=== Northern section ===
The canal starts at its north-eastern end at Clachnaharry Sea Lock, built at the end of a man-made peninsula to ensure that boats could always reach the deep water of the Beauly Firth. Because the peninsula is built with mud foundations, it has required regular maintenance ever since. Next to the lock is the former lock-keeper's house, a two-storey building with a single-storey bothy at its western end and an enclosed garden. At an unknown date, the house was divided into two, and in 2005 the eastern half became offices for Scottish Canals. The building is a category C listed structure. At the opposite end of the peninsula to the sea lock, a swing bridge carries the Far North railway line across the canal. The first bridge at the site was designed by Joseph Mitchell for the Inverness and Ross-shire Railway, and was constructed of wrought iron in 1862. This was replaced by a similar structure in 1909, made of steel, which is 123 feet (37.5 m) long. The bridge, together with the adjacent signal box, designed by Mackenzie and Holland for the Highland Railway in 1890, is a category B listed structure.

Clachnaharry lock is next to the swing bridge, and is bordered by a smiddy and workshops, dating from the canal's construction in 1810, and extended in 1840–50. The smiddy still contains two hearths for forging metal. Muirtown Basin provides moorings at the eastern end of the canal, which takes a right-angled turn at the far end to pass under a swing bridge carrying the A862 road to reach the flight of four Muirtown Locks. From the top of the flight, the canal continues southwards to Tomnahurich swing bridge, which carries the A82 road over the canal. The original timber bridge was replaced by a steel structure in 1938, designed by Crouch and Hogg, which included a control box, as levels of traffic on the road and canal were increasing. Nearby is the former bridge keeper's cottage, built in the 1820s. It was no longer needed to house a bridge keeper after 1965, and after being empty for some years, was converted into self-catering accommodation. A short distance to the south a second swing bridge was opened in June 2021, as part of the Inverness West Link project. A new control building was built between the two bridges, so that both could be controlled from a single location. The concept behind the second bridge was that traffic could be diverted to use one of the bridges while the other was open for canal traffic.

The canal from Muirtown Locks to Dochgarroch Lock is a scheduled monument, as is Dochgarroch Lock, which was designed to protect the canal from flooding caused by fluctuating levels in the River Ness, which flows over a weir to the south of the lock. A two-storey lock keeper's cottage and barn dating from the 1850s overlooks the lock. The final section of canal to Loch Dochfour is also scheduled, and the designated area includes the weir for the River Ness, and the west bank of Loch Dochfour as far as Loch Ness. At its southern end is Bona Lighthouse, built as a house by Thomas Telford in 1815, and altered around 1848 to act as a lighthouse. The building is octagonal, with two storeys, and is a rare example of an inland light. There was once a ferry across the Bona channel at this point. In 1844, the channel was made deeper and wider when barges pulled by horses were replaced by steam tugs, and there is evidence that the building once included four stables. The canal section from Clachnaharry Sea Lock to Bona is 9.7 miles (15.6 km) long, and from there it is over 20 miles (32 km) along Loch Ness to the next canal section at Fort Augustus.

=== Middle section ===
At the foot of Loch Ness, the Caledonian Canal leaves the west bank of the loch, with the River Oich to the north and the River Tarff to the south. The A82 road crosses the canal on a swing bridge, at the foot of the five locks that rise through the centre of the village of Fort Augustus. In 1975 only the locks were included in the scheduled monument designation, but that was subsequently extended to include all of the canal between them and Loch Ness, including the lighthouse at the entrance to this section of canal. At the top of the locks, a road beside the canal is spanned by a railway bridge, which was constructed to carry an intended line from Fort Augustus to Inverness. The bridge was in use from 1903 to 1906, when the railway project was abandoned. As well as the bridge, some piers built to carry the line over the River Oich can also be seen, although these are in a poor state of repair. The canal to Kyltra Lock and the lock itself are both scheduled monuments. The canal continues to Cullochy Lock, where to the north of the structure there is a single storey lock keeper's cottage on the west bank which dates from the building of the canal, and a pair of two-storey houses for the lock keepers, dating from around 1830, on the east bank. On the east side of the lock is a single-storey storehouse dating from 1815 to 1820, which has three bays and internally is divided into a store and an office for the lock keeper.

The final part of the canal on this section runs from the lock to Loch Oich, and includes the abutments of a small swing bridge which formerly provided an accommodation crossing over the canal. The more modern Aberchalder swing bridge carries the A82 over the canal. A single-storey three bay cottage designed by Telford once provided housing for the bridge keeper. Nearby is the old bridge that carried the road over the River Oich, which was probably designed by James Dredge in the 1850s. It is a chain suspension bridge, and a long dry stone causeway provides access from the east. The A82 crosses the river on a three-arched concrete bridge designed by Mears and Carus-Wilson and constructed in 1932. Loch Oich is the summit of the canal, at 106 feet (32.3 m) above sea level, and despite its relatively small size compared to Loch Ness and Loch Lochy, it provides most of the 41.2 million imperial gallons (187 Ml) of water that is required each day to keep the canal operating.

The short section of canal between Loch Oich and Loch Lochy is crossed by a plate girder swing bridge carrying the A82 road at its northern end, and ends at a pair of locks at its southern end. Two jetties project out into Loch Lochy, and much of the structure is built on reclaimed land. A single-storey store with basement stands to the east of the locks, which was probably used to store materials and to provide stabling for horses while the canal was being constructed. On the west bank is Glenjade Cottage, dating from 1840 to 1860, which was once a pair of cottages but was converted into a single dwelling in the late 20th century. Ivy Cottage was also built for lock keepers, but was completed for the opening of the canal, and so is older than Glenjade cottages.

=== Southern section ===
Loch Lochy is about 10 miles (16 km) long, and the next canal section starts at its southern end. Its entrance is marked by a small lighthouse, while to the east of the canal is the Mucomir Cut, which delivers water from the loch to Mucomir hydroelectric station and the River Lochy. There are two locks at Gairlochy, the upper one being the only lock which was not built for the opening of the canal. It was added in 1844, and was constructed by Jackson and Bean. Between the locks is Telford House, a large lock keeper's house built in 1811–13, and much larger than most of the other houses built along the canal. The B8084 road crosses the canal on a swing bridge at the upstream end of Gairlochy lower lock, but it is unclear whether it is part of the scheduled monument, since it is not specifically mentioned in the listing, whereas most bridges are either included or excluded. About 1 1/4 miles (2 km) further downstream is Moy Swing Bridge, an original accommodation bridge. It consists of two halves, and the lock keeper from Gairlochy opens the eastern half by operating a capstan, and then crosses the canal by punt to perform a similar action on the western half. A three-bay single-storey cottage, dating from around 1820, survives on the eastern bank of the canal next to the bridge.

The section below Moy Bridge includes four aqueducts which carry the canal over local rivers. These are the Loy aqueduct, the Muirshearlich aqueduct, the Sheangain aqueduct and the Mount Alexander aqueduct. The Loy aqueduct consists of three parallel arches, 260 feet (79 m) long, with the River Loy passing through the centre arch, and the side arches used for pedestrians and animals, although they sometimes carry flood flow from the river. Torcastle aqueduct is similar but slightly shorter at 240 feet (73 m), and carries the Allt Sheangain in two of the arches, with the third used as a roadway. Mount Alexander aqueduct only has two arches, one used by the Allt Mor, and the other a footpath.

Soon the canal arrives at the top of Neptune's Staircase, a flight of eight locks that drop the level of the canal by 64 feet (20 m) in the space of 500 yards (460 m). Halfway down the flight to the west is another house similar to that at Gairlochy, but split to provide accommodation for two lock keepers. On the eastern bank is a smithy and sawpits, dating from the 1820s, and a workshop dating from 1880 to 1890. Neptune's Staircase was originally fitted with 36 capstans each of which had to be rotated 20 times to operate the lock gates and sluices, but progress through the structure was sped up in the 20th century when the flight was mechanised. At the foot of the locks, a swing bridge carries the A830 road over the canal, and a steel bow truss swing bridge, built in 1901 by Simpson and Wilson, carries the West Highland Line from Fort William to Mallaig. The canal turns to the west to reach a pair of staircase locks at Corpach, which is followed by a small basin and the final sea lock to allow boats to access Loch Linnhe.

== Names ==
The canal has several names in Scottish Gaelic including Amar-Uisge/Seòlaid a' Ghlinne Mhòir ("Waterway of the Great Glen"), Sligh'-Uisge na h-Alba ("Waterway of Scotland") and a literal translation (An) Canàl Cailleannach.

== History ==
In 1620, a Highland prophet called the Brahan Seer predicted that full-rigged ships would one day be sailing round the back of Tomnahurich, near Inverness, at a time when the only navigable route near the location was the River Ness, on the other side of Tomnahurich.

Engineers started to look at the feasibility of a canal to connect Loch Linnhe near Fort William to the Moray Firth near Inverness in the 18th century, with Captain Edward Burt rejecting the idea in 1726, as he thought the mountains would channel the wind and make navigation too precarious.

The Commissioners of Forfeited Estates had originally been set up to handle the seizure and sale of land previously owned by those who had been convicted of treason following the Jacobite rising of 1715. By 1773, they had turned their attention to helping the fishing industry, and commissioned the inventor and mechanical engineer James Watt to make a survey of the route. He published a report in 1774, which suggested that a 10-foot (3.0 m) deep canal from Fort William to Inverness, passing through Loch Lochy, Loch Oich, Loch Ness and Loch Dochfour, would require 32 locks, and could be built for £164,032. He emphasised the benefits to the fishing industry, of a shorter and safer route from the east to the west coast of Scotland, and the potential for supplying the population with cheaper corn, but again, thought that winds on the lochs might be a problem.

Although no action was taken at the time, in 1785 the philanthropist John Knox expounded the benefits of it relieving distress in the Highlands, and preventing ships having to navigate the dangerous Pentland Firth between the Orkney Islands and Caithness. William Fraser, when proposing his own scheme for a canal in 1793, announced that "nature had finished more than half of it already". At the time, much of the Highlands were depressed as a result of the Highland Clearances, which had deprived many of their homes and jobs. Many emigrated to Canada or elsewhere, or moved to the Scottish Lowlands. Crop failures in 1799 and 1800 brought distress to many, and prompted a new wave of emigrants to leave. The engineer Thomas Telford was asked to investigate the problem of emigration in 1801, and in 1802 published his report, which suggested that the main cause was landowners who had previously kept cattle creating vast sheep-farms. Realising that direct government action to confront the issue would be seen as interference, he therefore suggested that a programme of public works, involving roads, bridges, and canals, would be a way to provide jobs for people who had been displaced by the sheep farming, and to stimulate industry, fishery, and agriculture.

Telford consulted widely with shipowners, who favoured a canal instead of the hazardous journey around the north of Scotland via Cape Wrath and the Pentland Firth. He obtained advice from Captain Gwynn of the Royal Navy, who stated that Loch Ness and Loch Lochy were sufficiently deep for any size of boat, and had safe anchorages if winds proved to be a problem, but that Loch Oich would need to be made deeper, as it was shallow in places. He established that Loch Garry, to the west of Invergarry, and Loch Quoich, beyond that, would provide an adequate water supply. He estimated that a canal suitable for ships with a draught of 20 feet (6.1 m) could be built in seven years, and would cost around £350,000. An additional benefit would be the protection that the canal offered to shipping from attacks by French privateers. Telford also looked at the possibility of a canal to link Loch Eil to Loch Shiel, both to the west of Fort William, but ruled out the scheme because of the depth of cuttings that would have been required. The canal, as well as a number of projects to build roads, harbours and bridges, was the first time that public works of this sort had been funded by the government. Telford had convinced them that it was feasible, and that employing local people on it would help to stop the tide of emigration, but no one considered whether it would pay its way when it was completed.

=== Planning ===
Caledonian Canal Act 1803
- Act of Parliament
- Parliament of the United Kingdom
- Long title: An Act for granting to His Majesty the Sum of Twenty thousand Pounds, towards defraying the Expence of making an Inland Navigation from the Eastern to the Western Sea, by Inverness and Fort William, and for taking the necessary Steps towards executing the same.
- Citation: 43 Geo. 3. c. 102
- Territorial extent: United Kingdom

Dates
- Royal assent: 27 July 1803
- Commencement: 27 July 1803 (Note: The Acts of Parliament (Commencement) Act 1793.)
Other legislation
Amended by	Caledonian Canal Act 1848; Statute Law Revision Act 1872
Relates to	Caledonian Canal Act 1804; Caledonian Canal Act 1840

Status: Amended

Text of statute as originally enacted

Caledonian Canal Act 1804
- Act of Parliament
- Parliament of the United Kingdom
- Long title: An Act for making further Provision for making and maintaining an Inland Navigation, commonly called The Caledonian Canal, from the Eastern to the Western Sea by Inverness and Fort William, in Scotland.
- Citation: 44 Geo. 3. c. 62
- Territorial extent: United Kingdom

Dates
- Royal assent: 29 June 1804
- Commencement: 29 June 1804
Other legislation
Amended by	Caledonian Canal Act 1848
Relates to	Caledonian Canal Act 1803; Caledonian Canal Act 1840

Status: Amended

Text of statute as originally enacted

On 27 July 1803, an act of the Parliament of the United Kingdom, the Caledonian Canal Act 1803 (43 Geo. 3. c. 102) was passed to authorise the project, and carried the title: An Act for granting to his Majesty the Sum of £20,000, towards defraying the Expense of making an Inland Navigation from the western to the eastern Sea, by Inverness and Fort William; and for taking the necessary steps towards executing the same. The act appointed commissioners, to oversee the project, and some funding to enable the work to start. Less than a year later, on 29 June 1804, the commissioners obtained a second act of Parliament, the Caledonian Canal Act 1804 (44 Geo. 3. c. 62) which granted them £50,000 per year of government money, payable in two instalments, to fund the ongoing work.

Provision was made for private investors to buy shares in the scheme, for any amount over £50, and as well as building the main line of the canal, the engineers could alter Loch Garry, Loch Quoich and Loch Arkaig, to improve their function as reservoirs. Telford was asked to survey, design and build the waterway. He worked with William Jessop on the survey, and the two men oversaw the construction until Jessop died in 1814. The canal was expected to take seven years to complete, and to cost £474,000, to be funded by the Government, but both estimates were inadequate. Telford understood the need for competent men to be involved in such a grand project, and convinced most of those who had been involved with him on building the Ellesmere Canal and the Pontcysyllte Aqueduct to move north to Scotland. He ensured that Jessop became the consulting engineer, while Matthew Davidson, who was a stonemason from Dumfriesshire and had been Superintendent of Works on the Ellesmere project, became the resident engineer at the Clachnaharry end, near Inverness. The Corpach end, near Fort William, was managed by John Telford, who is thought not to have been related to Thomas, but was known to him from Ellesmere. At the time, Telford's scheme for the development of the Highlands was the largest programme of works ever undertaken for a specific area in Britain.

Telford was responsible to the Caledonian Canal Commissioners in London for the canal work, and to the Commissioners for Roads and Bridges for the construction of roads. He visited the Highlands twice a year, to plan the work and inspect the progress, and was always on the move, to the extent that the Canal Commissioners allowed him to choose the dates when he would find it convenient to meet with them. In the Highlands, Telford faced a number of problems, in that the canal was to be built in an area where people lived a subsistence lifestyle, managing by keeping a few cows and paying low rents. They had virtually no knowledge of wheeled vehicles, and no construction skills, but were hardy and willing to learn. While surveying the route for the canal, Telford agreed to increase the size of the locks to accommodate 32-gun frigates for the Royal Navy, and Jessop insisted that the locks should be built of stone, rather than having turf sides, as Telford had suggested.

The highest point on the route was at Laggan, between Lock Oich and Loch Lochy. A deep cutting was required, so that the canal continued at the same level as Loch Oich. The loch would need dredging, because it was too shallow in places, but it was fed by water from Loch Garry and Loch Quoich to the west, which would provide a suitable supply for the canal. To reduce the depth of cutting between Loch Oich and Loch Lochy, a dam would be built at the south end of Loch Lochy, to raise its level by 12 feet (3.7 m). A new channel for the River Lochy would be cut, allowing it to flow into the River Spean, so that its previous course could be used for the canal. Similarly, heading north from Loch Oich, parts of the canal would be constructed in the bed of the River Oich, which would be diverted to the east. At the northern end of Loch Ness, the channel through Loch Dochfour would have to be made deeper, and a weir was to be constructed at its northern end, to maintain the loch at the same level as Loch Ness.

Telford and Jessop had a long list of things to do, because of the lack of construction skills in the region where the canal was built. As well as the normal surveying, inspection and payment duties, they had to train local people in how to become workers. They were required to source all of the building materials, to construct workshops and settlements for the workers, design tools and waggons to be used by the workers, and in some cases, ensure they had supplies of food and drink. All of the money provided by Parliament passed through Telford's personal bank account. Because of the remoteness of the location, construction was started at both ends, so that completed sections could be used to bring in the materials for the middle sections. In order to help the Highlanders to learn the habits of paid employment, Telford appointed organisers and pace-setters, who would impart skill and activity to the other workers, and wherever possible, the work was done by piecework, so that earthworks were paid at 6 pence (2.5p) per cubic yard, cutting rock in Corpach Basin was paid at two shillings (10p) per cubic yard, and rubble masonry work was paid at 11 shillings (55p) per cubic yard, for example. The number of men employed fluctuated widely, not least because many would take time off to attend to peat cutting, herring fishing or harvesting. John Telford was upset because many of his men did not return after the harvest, but they were not used to working during the winter months. Many saw working on the canal as a way to supplement their meagre income, not as a way to escape from their subsistence livelihood.

=== Construction ===
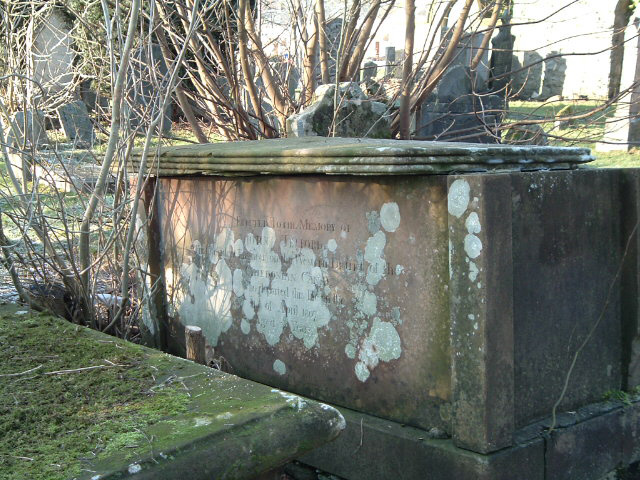
Grave of John Telford, Kilmallie churchyard

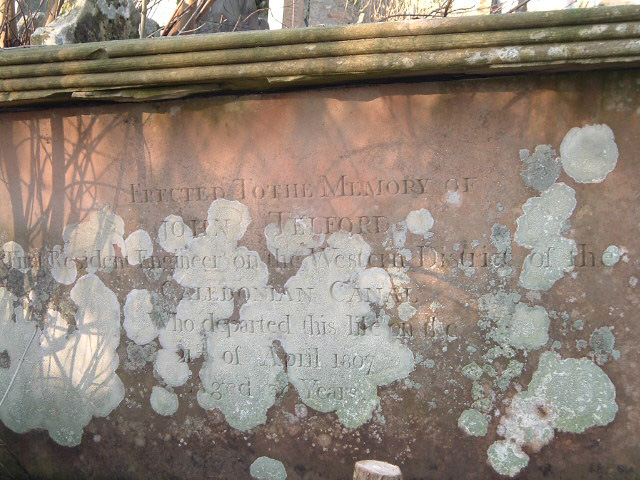
Inscription on John Telford's grave.

At Clachnaharry, to the west of Inverness, Davidson was overseeing the construction. Clachnaharry Lock was the first to be constructed at the eastern end of the canal, being completed in 1807 by Simpson and Cargill. Simpson was another of Telford's recruits from the Ellesmere project. Muirtown Basin was also completed in the same year. It was 800 by 140 yards (730 by 130 m), and construction was aided by the fact that its bottom was above the level of low tides, and so it was relatively easy to keep the works dry. The road from the basin into Inverness was renamed Telford Street, and Simpson and Cargill built a row of houses for overseers and contractors to live in, including themselves. To build the sea lock, two banks were built out into the Beauly Firth across mud which was 56 feet (17 m) deep. Two tramways with a gauge of 3 ft 3 in (991 mm) were constructed along the banks, to bring rubble and earth to extend the banks. By the time the banks were completed, the price of foreign timber to construct a coffer dam had risen so much that work was postponed. The four Muirtown locks were finished in 1809. During this time, Davidson noticed that the sea banks were settling into the mud, and the idea of turning the two banks into a peninsula and then excavating the lock into it was formulated. It is unclear whether the concept was Telford's, Jessop's or Davidson's, but it saved the expense of building a coffer dam. The peninsula was allowed to settle for six months before excavation began, and a 6 hp (4.5 kW) Boulton and Watt steam engine was used to keep the lock pit dry during the work. The structure was completed in 1812, three years later than Davidson's original estimate.

At Corpach, near Fort William, John Telford faced a number of problems. The entrance lock and the basin were built on rock, and this entailed excavating rock below the level of Loch Linnhe. A 20 hp (15 kW) steam engine was ordered from Boulton and Watt at Birmingham, to keep the work area dry, and an embankment was built beyond the sea lock, which served as a quay for incoming materials until the lock was constructed. Masons built several buildings at Corpach, but then moved on to building the aqueducts to carry the canal over rivers, since the lower canal needed to be completed to enable materials to be brought to the great flight of locks at Banavie. The work was to prove a serious challenge to John Telford's health and he died in 1807, to be replaced by Alexander Easton. He was buried in Kilmallie churchyard, where his ornate grave, now in dilapidated condition, can still be seen.

At Banavie, two houses for lock keepers were built by Simpson and Wilson before work on the locks started, which were occupied by masons during the estimated four years that it would take to finish the flight. The stonework was largely completed by 1811, three and a half years after work started. By early 1810, the steam engine at Corpach was ready, and the coffer dam to enable the sea lock to be built was completed by mid-1810, after considerable difficulty. Completing the lock was a priority, because the steam engine had to be kept running until the gates could hold back the sea, and it was the first lock to become operational, being completed just before the sea lock at Clachnaharry. By 1816, the canal was complete as far as Loch Lochy, but could not be used until the level of the loch was raised, and that depended on work further along the canal being completed.

The ground through which the canal was cut was variable, and further difficulties were experienced with the construction of the locks, the largest ever built at the time. There were also problems with the labour force, with high levels of absence, particularly during and after the potato harvest and the peat cutting season. This led to Telford bringing in Irish navvies to manage the shortfall, which led to further criticism, since one of the main aims of the project was to reduce unemployment in the Highlands. The canal finally opened in 1822, having taken an extra 12 years to complete, and cost £910,000. Over 3,000 local people had been employed in its construction, but the draught had been reduced from 20 to 15 ft (6.1 to 4.6 m) in an effort to save costs. In the meantime, shipbuilding had advanced, with the introduction of steam-powered iron-hulled ships, many of which were by that time too big to use the canal. The Royal Navy did not need to use the canal either, as Napoleon had been defeated at Waterloo in 1815, and the perceived threat to shipping when the canal was started was now gone.

== Operation ==
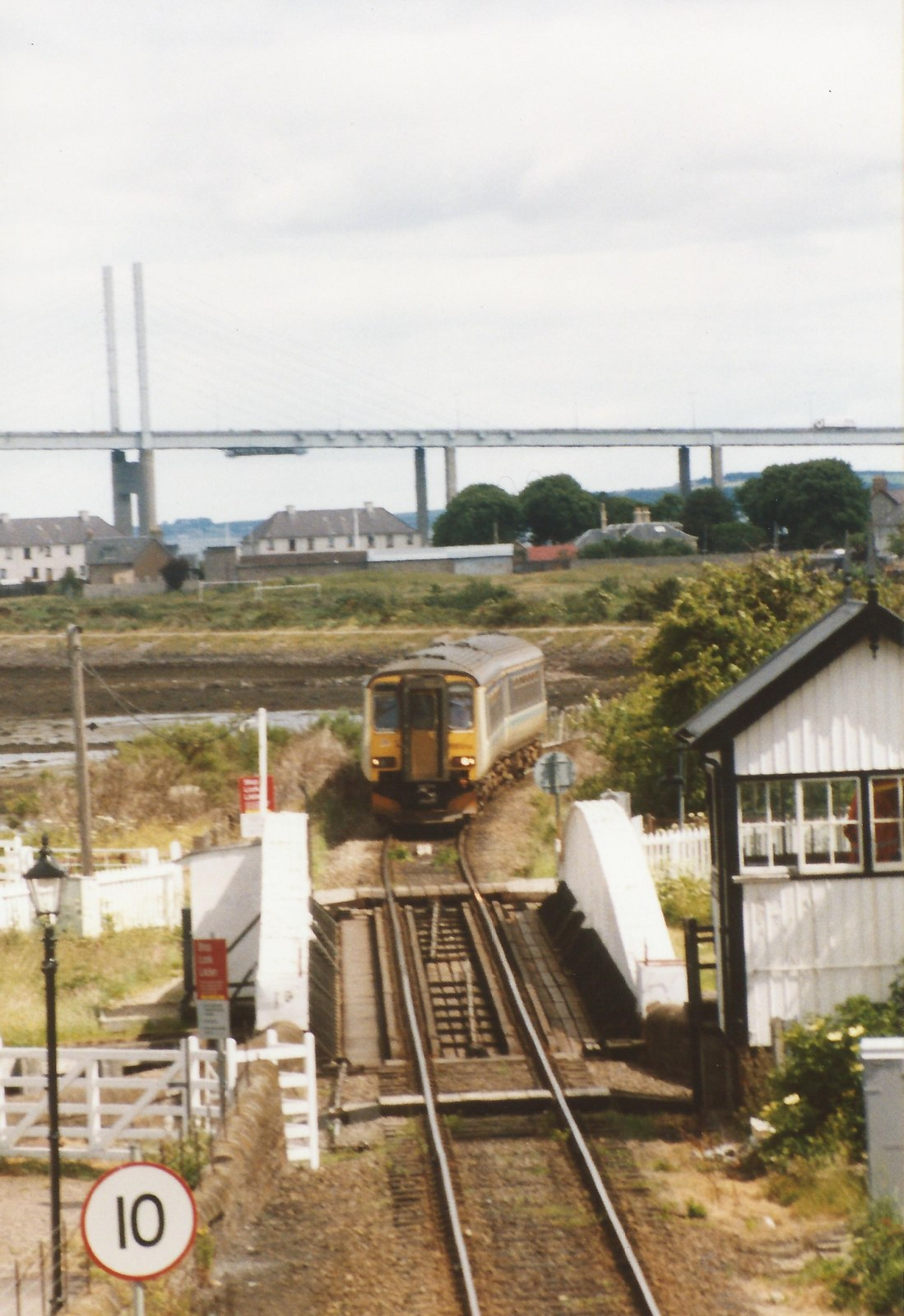
British Rail Class 156 on a Far North Line service crossing over the canal on the Clachnaharry Swing Bridge. The bridge in the background is the Kessock Bridge.

Before long, defects in some of the materials used became apparent, and part of Corpach double lock collapsed in 1843. This led to a decision to close the canal to allow repairs to be carried out, and the depth was increased to 18 feet (5.5 m) at the same time. The work was designed by Telford's associate James Walker, carried out by Jackson and Bean of Aston, Birmingham and completed between 1843 and 1847 at a cost of £136,089. However, not all of the traffic expected to return to using the canal did so. Commercially, the venture was not a success, but the dramatic scenery through which it passes led to it becoming a tourist attraction. Queen Victoria took a trip along it in 1873, and the publicity surrounding the trip resulted in a large increase in visitors to the region and the canal. The arrival of the railways at Fort William, Fort Augustus and Inverness did little to harm the canal, as trains were scheduled to connect with steamboat services.

There was an upsurge in commercial traffic during the First World War, when components for the construction of mines were shipped through the canal on their way from America to “U.S. Naval Base 18” (Muirtown Basin, Inverness), and fishing boats used it to avoid possible enemy action on the longer route around the north of Scotland. During this period there was 24-hour operation, facilitated by buoyage and lighting throughout its length. Ownership passed to the Ministry of Transport in 1920, and then to British Waterways in 1962. Improvements were made, with the locks being mechanised between 1964 and 1969. By 1990, the canal was in obvious need of restoration, with lock walls bulging, and it was estimated that repairs would cost £60 million. With no prospect of the Government funding this, British Waterways devised a repair plan, and between 1995 and 2005, sections of the canal were drained each winter. Stainless steel rods were used to tie the double-skinned lock walls together, and over 25,000 tonnes of grout were injected into the lock structures. All of the lock gates were replaced, and the result was a canal whose structures were probably in a better condition than they had ever been. In 1993, British Waterways and Parks Canada agreed to twin the canal with the Rideau Canal in Ontario, Canada.

The canal is now a scheduled monument, and attracts over 500,000 visitors each year. British Waterways, who work with the Highland Council and Forestry and Land Scotland through the Great Glen Ways Initiative, were hoping to increase this number to over 1 million by 2012. There are many ways for tourists to enjoy the canal, such as taking part in the Great Glen Rally, cycling along the tow-paths, cruising on hotel barges or paddling the canal in canoes, kayaks or paddleboards.

Locks along the Caledonian Canal
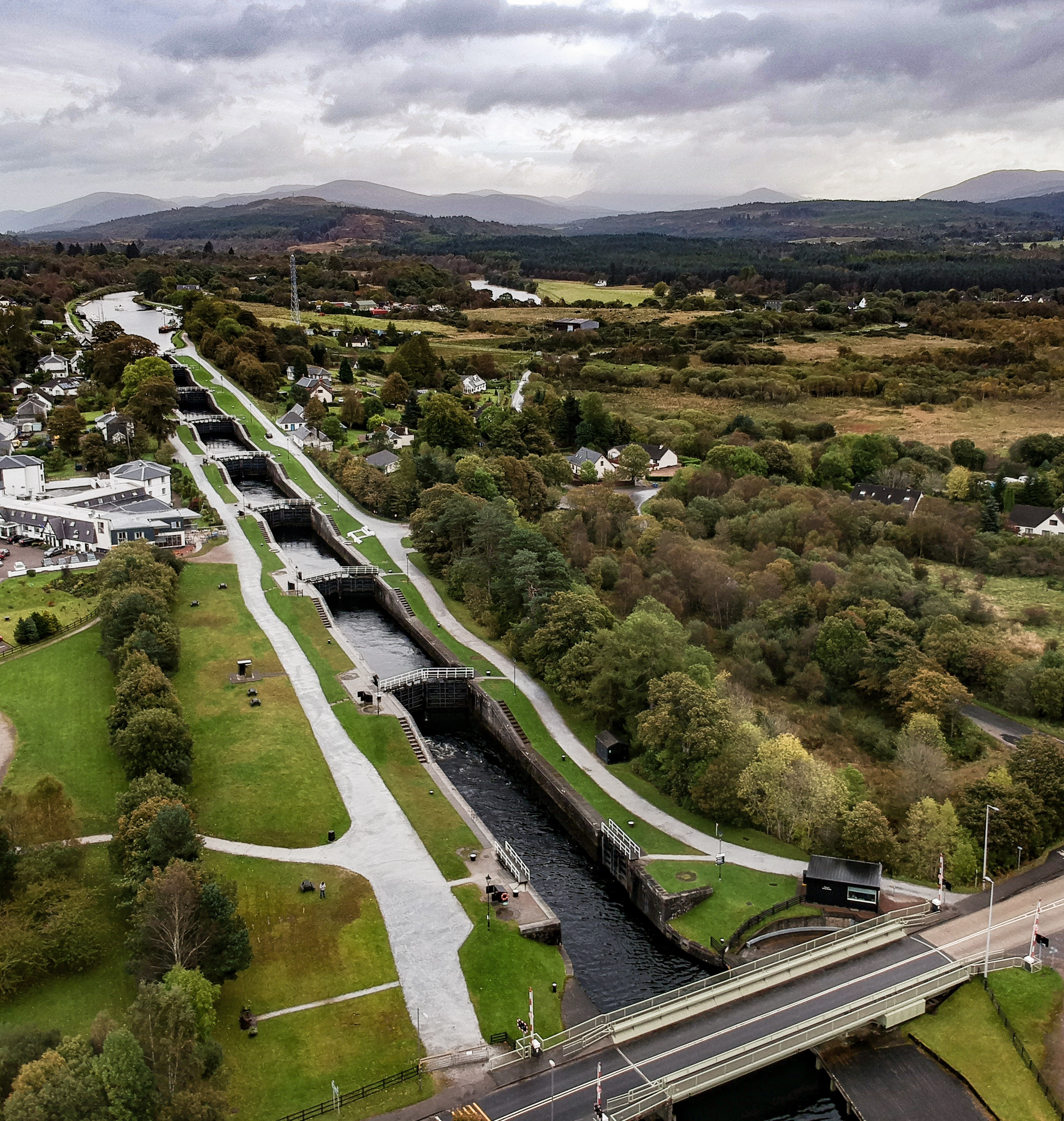
Neptune's Staircase, the longest staircase lock in Britain.

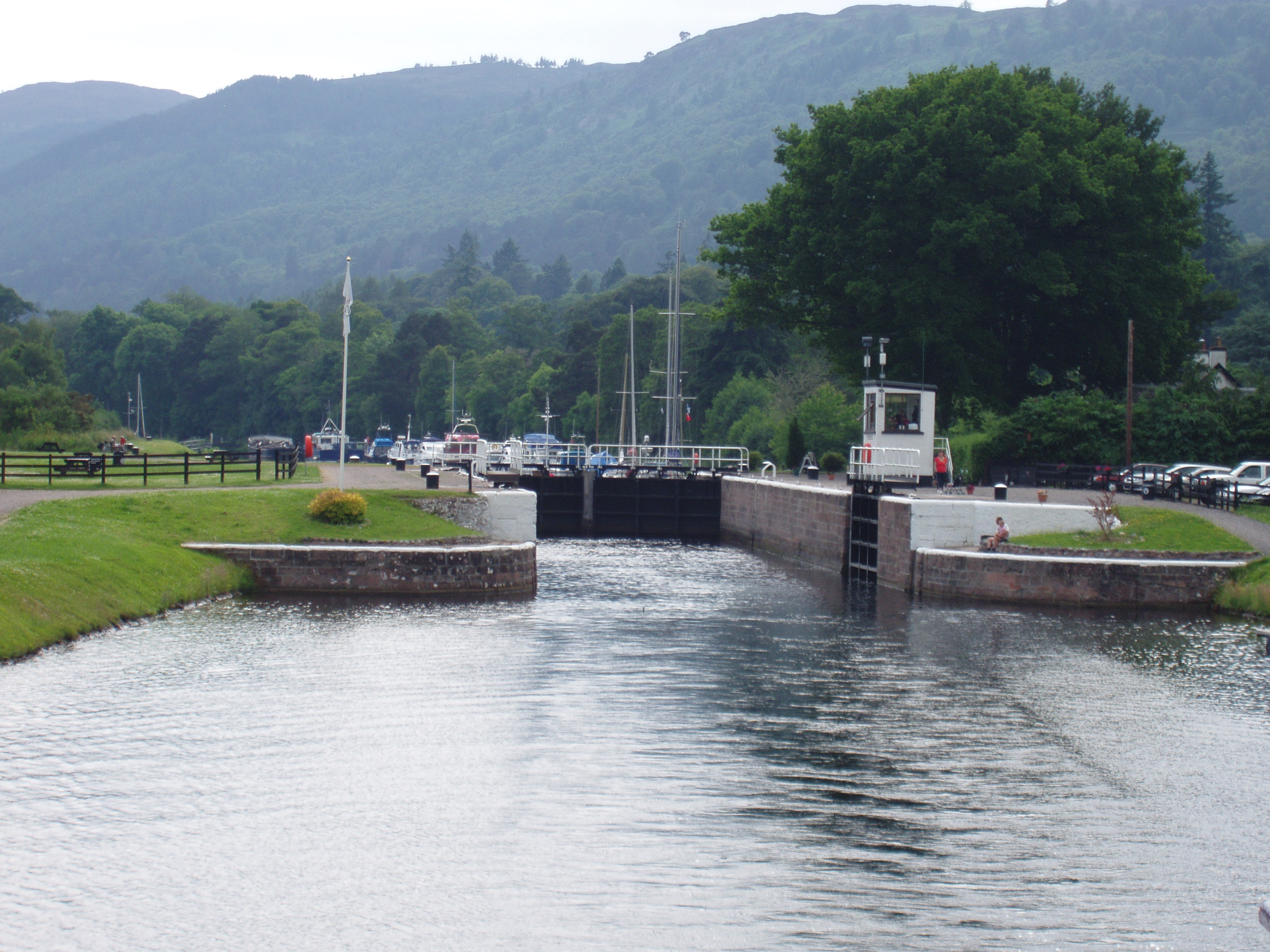
The Dochgarroch Lock along the Caledonian Canal with its lower gates open. The upper gates leading to Loch Dochfour are closed.

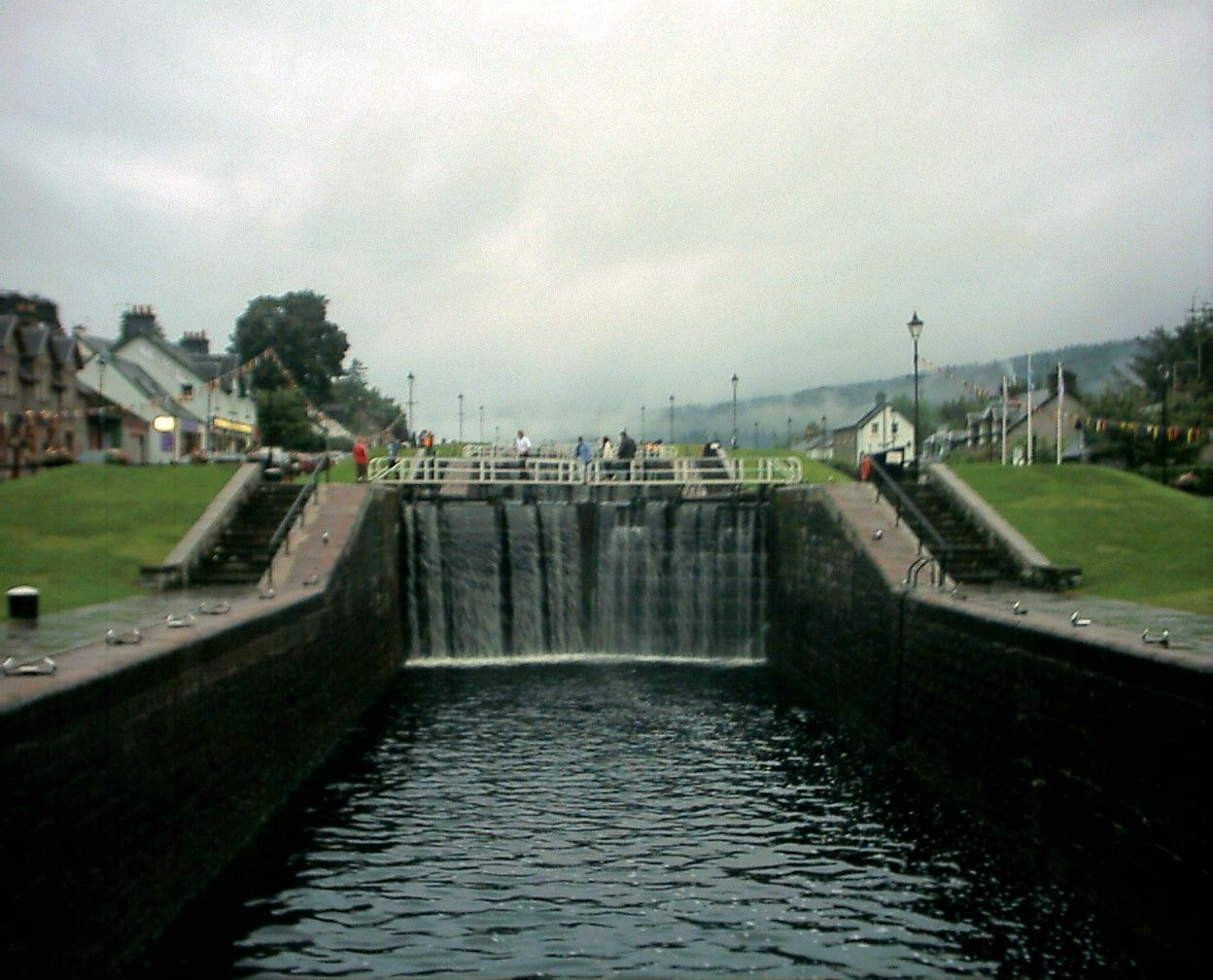
Locks on the Caledonian Canal at Fort Augustus

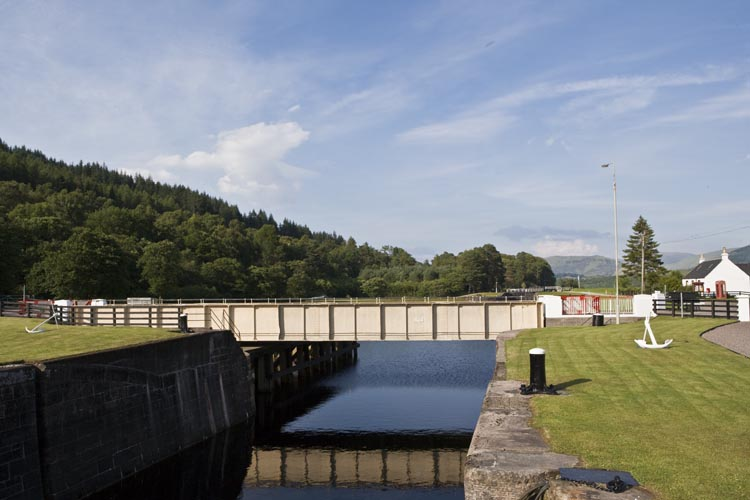
Gairlochy Bottom Lock

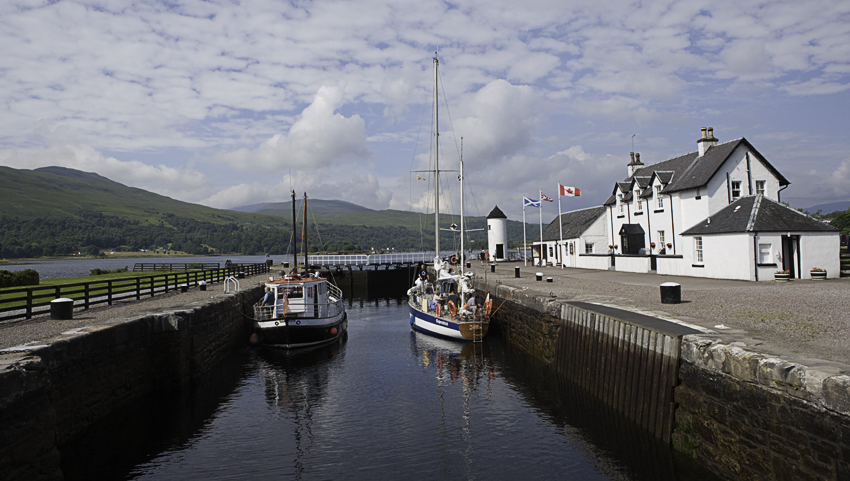
Corpach sea lock

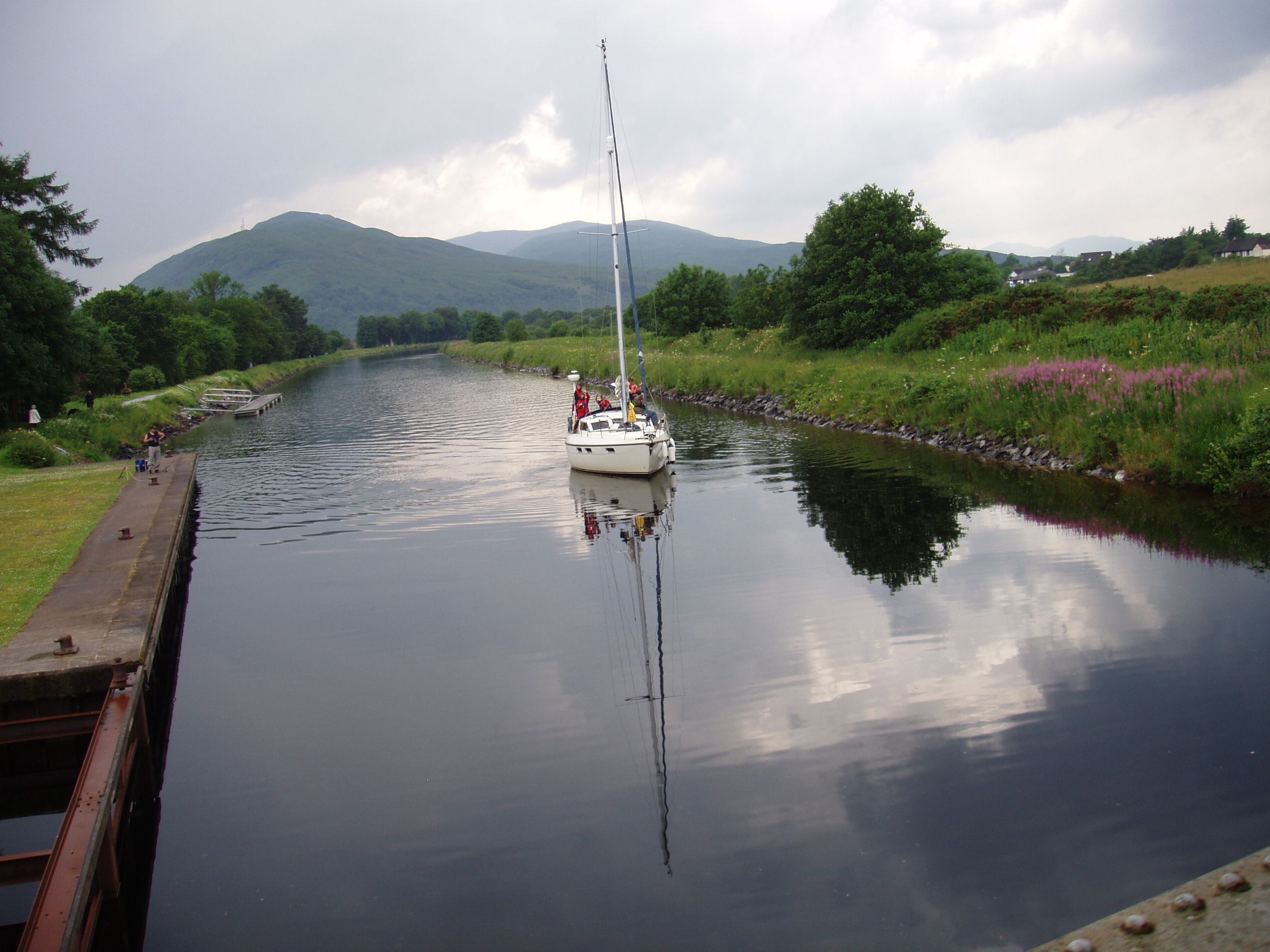
A sailing boat on the Caledonian Canal approaches from the Loch Linnhe side of the Mallaig Extension Railway swing bridge.

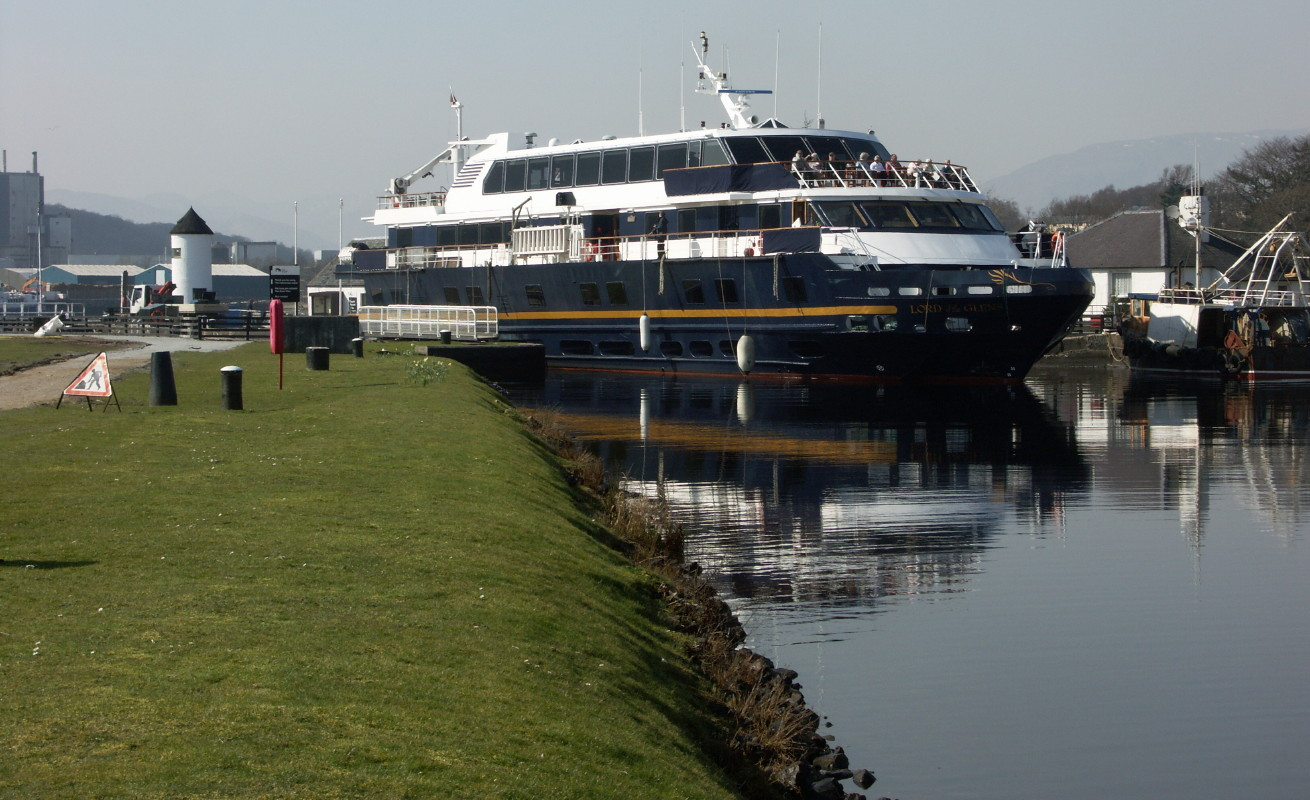
Lord of the Glens leaving Corpach Sea Lock

== Points of interest ==
Point	Coordinates (Links to map resources)	OS Grid Ref	Notes
Clachnaharry Sea Lock, Inverness	57.4906°N 4.2628°W	NH644467	
Muirtown Locks, Inverness	57.4807°N 4.2490°W	NH652456	
Dochgarroch Lock	57.4330°N 4.3023°W	NH618404	
Entrance to Loch Ness	57.4077°N 4.3285°W	NH602376	
Fort Augustus Locks	57.1447°N 4.6831°W	NH377091	
Kytra Lock	57.1224°N 4.7229°W	NH352067	
Cullochy Lock	57.0979°N 4.7397°W	NH341041	
Laggan Locks	57.0259°N 4.8254°W	NN286963	
Gairlochy Top Lock	56.9146°N 4.9940°W	NN178843	
Neptune's Staircase, Banavie	56.8465°N 5.0935°W	NN114770	
Corpach Locks	56.8420°N 5.1231°W	NN096766	

== See also ==
- Banavie Pier railway station
- Göta Canal—Sister canal in Sweden

== Bibliography ==
- Cameron, A. D. (2005). The Caledonian Canal. Edinburgh: Birlinn. ISBN 978-1-84158-403-4.
- Cumberlidge, Jane (2009). Inland Waterways of Great Britain (8th ed.). Imray Laurie Norie and Wilson. ISBN 978-1-84623-010-3.
- Glen, Louise (15 July 2021). "Is Torvean Swing Bridge helping to ease congestion?". Inverness Courier. Archived from the original on 12 August 2022.
- Hadfield, Charles; Skempton, A. W. (1979). William Jessop, Engineer. Newton Abbot, UK: David & Charles. ISBN 978-0-7153-7603-4.
- Hayward, David (2007). The Caledonian Canal. British Waterways. ISBN 978-0-9556339-2-8.
- Hutton, Guthrie (n.d.). Getting to Know ... the Caledonian Canal. privately published.
- Hutton, Guthrie (1998). The Caledonian Canal: Lochs, lochs and pleasure steamers. Ochiltree: Stenlake Publishing. ISBN 978-1-84033-033-5.
- Lindsay, Jean (1968). The Canals of Scotland. Newton Abbot: David and Charles. ISBN 978-0-7153-4240-4.
- McKnight, Hugh (1981). The Shell Book of Inland Waterways. David and Charles. ISBN 978-0-7153-8239-4.
- Paterson, Len (2005). From Sea to Sea: A history of the Scottish lowland and highland canals. Glasgow: Neil Wilson Publishing. ISBN 978-1-903238-94-3.
- Pratt, Edwin A. (1921). "Invergordon, Dalmore and U.S. mines". British Railways and the Great War. Vol. 2. London, UK: Selwyn & Blount. OCLC 835846426.
- Priestley, Joseph (1831). "Historical Account of the Navigable Rivers, Canals, and Railways of Great Britain". Archived from the original on 3 March 2016.
