= Neptune's Staircase =

System of canal locks in Scotland

Coordinates: 56.846°N 5.094°W

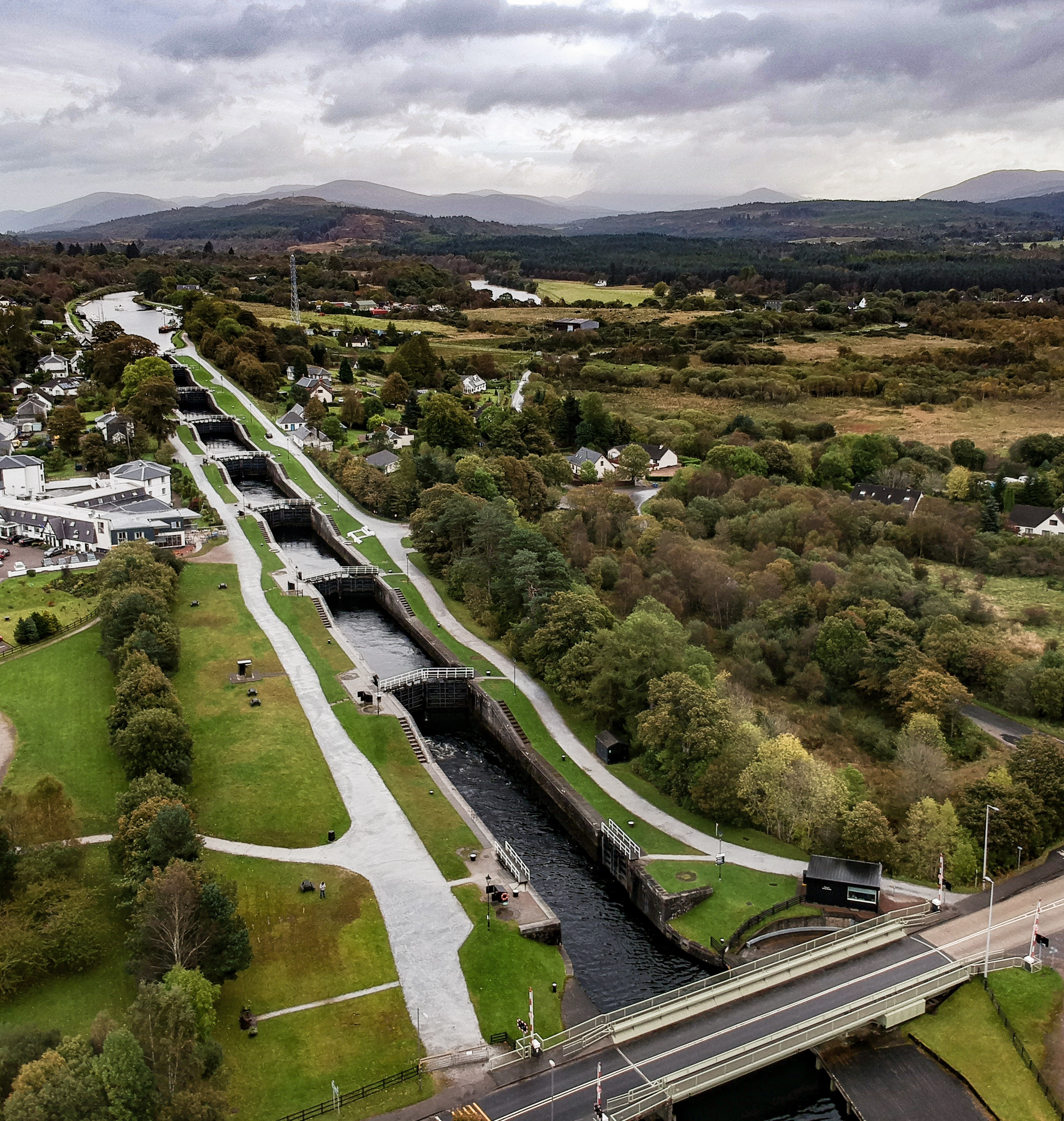
- Aerial view from the west
- Interactive map of Neptune's Staircase
- Waterway: Caledonian Canal
- Maintained by: Scottish Canals
- Operation: Hydraulic
- First built: 1811
- Length: 180 feet (55 m)
- Width: 40 feet (12 m)
- Fall: 64 feet (20 m)
- Staircase of 8 locks

Neptune's Staircase (grid reference NN113769) is a staircase lock comprising eight locks on the Caledonian Canal. Built by Thomas Telford between 1803 and 1822, it is the longest staircase lock in Britain. The system was originally hand-powered but has been converted to hydraulic operation.

== Description ==
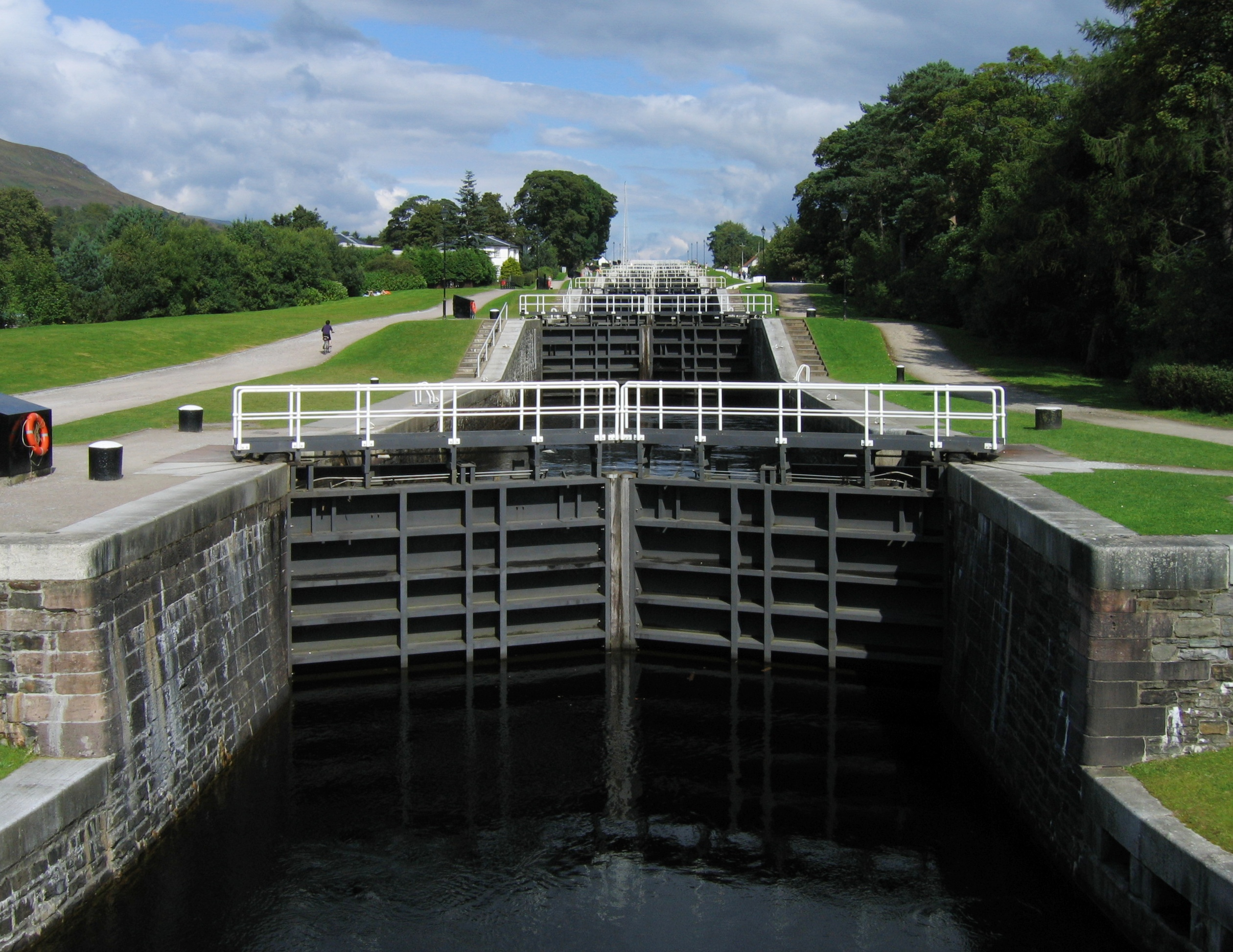
Looking up the staircase

Neptune's Staircase at Banavie, near Fort William just north of Loch Linnhe, is kept by Scottish Canals. It is the longest staircase lock in Britain, lifting boats 64 feet (20 m). It consists of eight locks, each 180 feet (55 m) by 40 feet (12 m), and it takes boats about 90 minutes to pass through the system.

The current lock gates weigh 22 tons each, and require a team of at least three lock-keepers to operate the staircase. They usually operate on an "efficiency basis"; that is, they try either to fill each cut with ascending boats or with descending boats, or to allow for passing, i.e. a dropping craft to pass a rising craft on the same fill/empty cycle.

Prior to mechanisation, the locks were operated by capstans, each with four poles, which had to make seven full revolutions to open or close a gate. Each gate leaf had two capstans, one to open it and another to close it. There were 36 capstans on the flight, and 126 revolutions were required for a boat to travel up or down the complete flight. With the advent of hydraulic rams and push-button control, transit times through the flight have been reduced from just over half a day to 90 minutes. The base plinths of the original capstans can still be seen, although the capstans themselves have been removed.

== History ==
The Caledonian Canal was conceived by the engineer Thomas Telford after the government asked him to look at measures which might stem emigration from the Highlands. He suggested that the construction of public works would provide employment, and would also help to develop industry, fishery and agriculture. An Act of Parliament obtained in July 1803 established a board of commissioners to oversee the work. Telford was appointed as principal engineer, with William Jessop as consulting engineer. There were two resident engineers; the one covering the southern section, including Neptune's Staircase, was John Telford, who was no relation to the principal engineer.

It was intended to build the locks 162 by 38 feet (49 by 12 m), with smaller locks beside them through which boats carrying up to 200 tons could pass, but after consideration of the size of 32-gun frigates and ships which traded with the Baltic, the size of the main locks was increased to 170 by 40 feet (52 by 12 m), and the smaller locks were omitted. It was decided to arrange the locks in clusters to reduce the cost of the project, and so Banavie was chosen as the site for eight locks. On the Forth and Clyde Canal, low level crossings were carried over the canal by bascule bridges, but Telford and Jessop rejected this arrangement for their canal, as they thought the risk of masts being damaged by them was too great. Consequently, cast iron swing bridges were used, and both the road and the railway at the foot of the flight cross bridges of this type.

To provide rubble-stone to build the locks, a quarry was opened at Corpach Moss. By June 1809, three of the locks had been completed, and although completion of the flight was expected in 1810, there was a shortage of labour, and only three more were finished. The final two were ready by the end of 1811. As built, the staircase locks were 180 feet (55 m) long, rather than the 170 feet (52 m) of the single locks. Construction of the rest of the canal dragged on, and it was not finally opened until October 1822. Traffic through the locks developed steadily, and in 1824 an inn was created for passengers on the steamboats, by converting one of the lock houses on the flight. Three steamboats regularly ran between Glasgow and Inverness, taking six days to complete the round trip.

There were some teething problems, and the canal was closed for two weeks in April 1829 while problems with the Banavie locks were rectified. James Loch, who produced a report on the canal in 1835, declared that the inn at Banavie was too small, and too far from Corpach, despite having praised it the previous year. George May produced another report in 1837, in which the Banavie locks were heavily criticised. He described the masonry as "execrable", and argued that the contractor who had built them had not expected them ever to be used, but had somehow managed to hide the poor workmanship from Telford. A suggestion that the canal should be abandoned was, however, circumvented. Repairs to the locks were required in 1880 and in 1910: there were serious defects in the masonry. By the end of the First World War, the canal was in serious financial difficulties, with maintenance costs far exceeding revenue, and in 1920 the Ministry of Transport made a grant of £11,000 for major repairs to the Banavie locks. The canal closed for nine weeks while the work was carried out. A further stoppage of three months occurred in 1929, when a Drifter (fishing boat) broke through two of the Banavie lock gates, causing flooding.

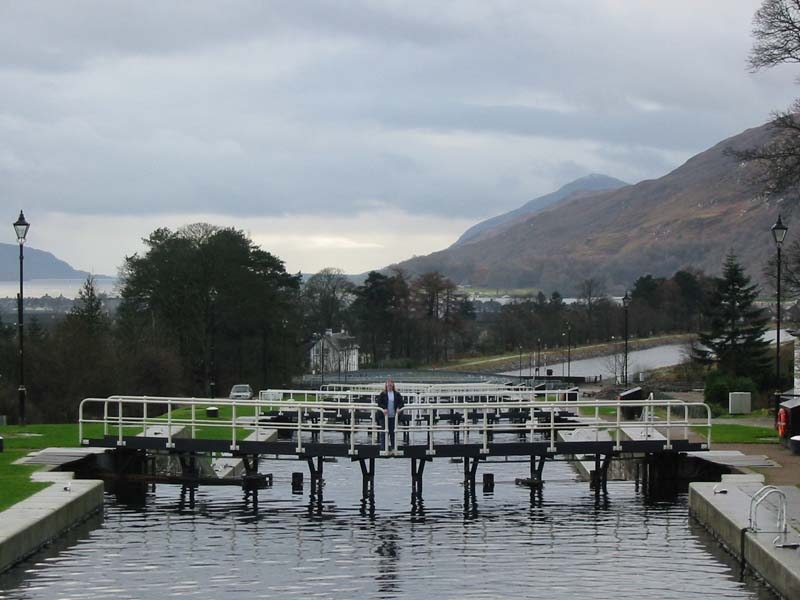
Looking down the locks to the entrance canal from Loch Linnhe and the sea

The canal passed into the care of the British Waterways Board in 1962. A programme of mechanising the locks was begun, and all locks were mechanised by 1969. There were several calls to close the canal following accidents in which ships hit lock gates, or masonry collapsed, and by the 1990s the canal was in crisis. Lock walls were bulging and leaking, and the cost of rebuilding the locks and replacing the gates was estimated at £60 million. The money was not available, and so engineers devised another plan, which cost only one third of that. Over ten winters from 1995 to 2005, sections of the canal were drained, and the locks were repaired by drilling holes into the double-skinned walls, after which stainless steel rods were used to stitch the walls together, and huge quantities of grout were used to seal and waterproof the structures. New lock gates were fitted, and where necessary, new stone blocks were cut to make repairs, rather than using concrete. By the end of the project, 16,000 holes had been drilled, 25,000 tons of grout had been used, and the locks were probably in better condition than they had been since they were first built.

Since 2012, the locks have been managed by Scottish Canals, the trading name of British Waterways in Scotland after the management of canals in England and Wales was split off to the Canal and River Trust. They remain publicly owned, accountable to the Scottish Parliament, although in 2020/21 their legal status changed from a public corporation to a non-departmental public body.

== See also ==
- Canals of the United Kingdom
- History of the British canal system
- Fonserannes Locks

== Bibliography ==
- Hayward, David (2007). The Caledonian Canal. British Waterways Scotland. ISBN 978-0-9556339-2-8.
- Lindsay, Jean (1968). The Canals of Scotland. Newton Abbott: David & Charles. ISBN 0-7153-4240-1.
