= Loch Eil =

Lake in Scotland

Coordinates: 56°51′N 5°14′W

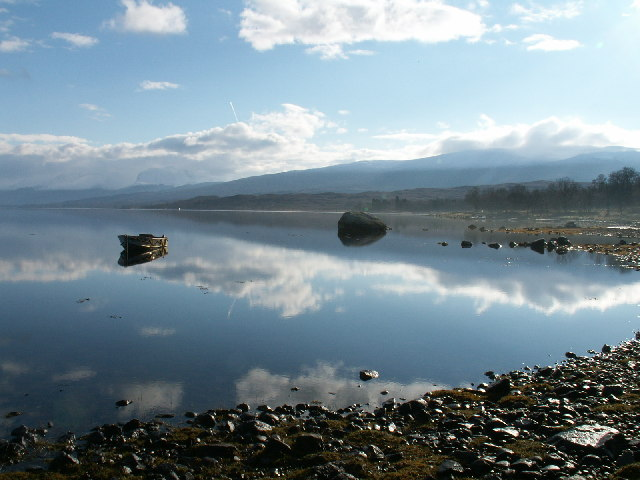
Looking south east along the shoreline from the western head of Loch Eil.

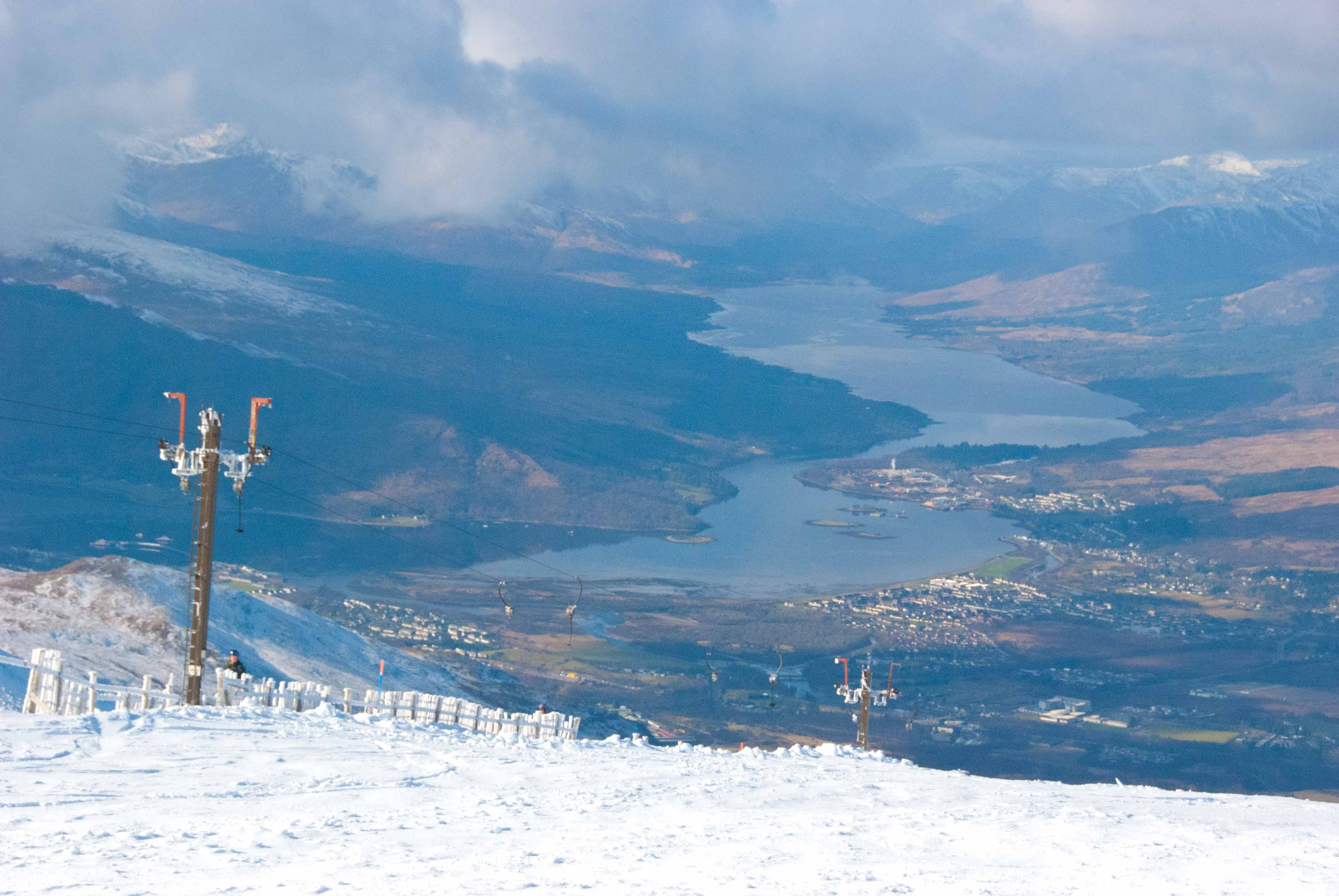
Loch Linnhe and beyond it Loch Eil. These sea lochs are separated by Caolas na h-Annait or Annat narrows. Viewed from the ski slopes of Aonach Mor.

Loch Eil (Scottish Gaelic: Loch Iall) is a sea loch in Lochaber, Scotland that opens into Loch Linnhe near the town of Fort William.

Ardvorlich notes that "the name of the Chief of Clan Cameron is spelt LOCHIEL, while the name of the loch is spelt LOCH EIL."

Loch Eil Outward Bound railway station and Locheilside railway station are both situated on the northern shore of the loch. Achaphubuil is on the southern shore.

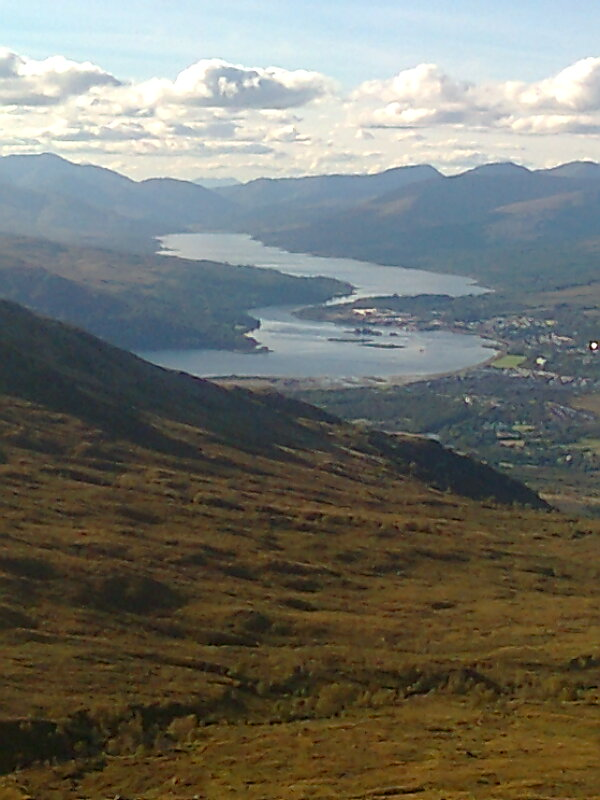
Loch Eil and head of Loch Linnhe from the slopes of Carn Mòr Dearg.

Lochiel was a historic place east of Fassfern on the north shore of Loch Eil. The place was home to Jacobite chieftain Donald Cameron, of Lochiel.

Remnant septs of Clan Chattan such as MacPhail remained in the area after the Clan mostly moved to Inverness. These MacPhails became part of Clan Cameron.

The earliest known residence of the chiefs of Clan Cameron was on Eilean nan Craobh (The island of the trees) just outside the entrance to Loch Eil. They moved from there to Tor Castle in the 17th century and later to Achnacarry. The island has now become part of harbour works.

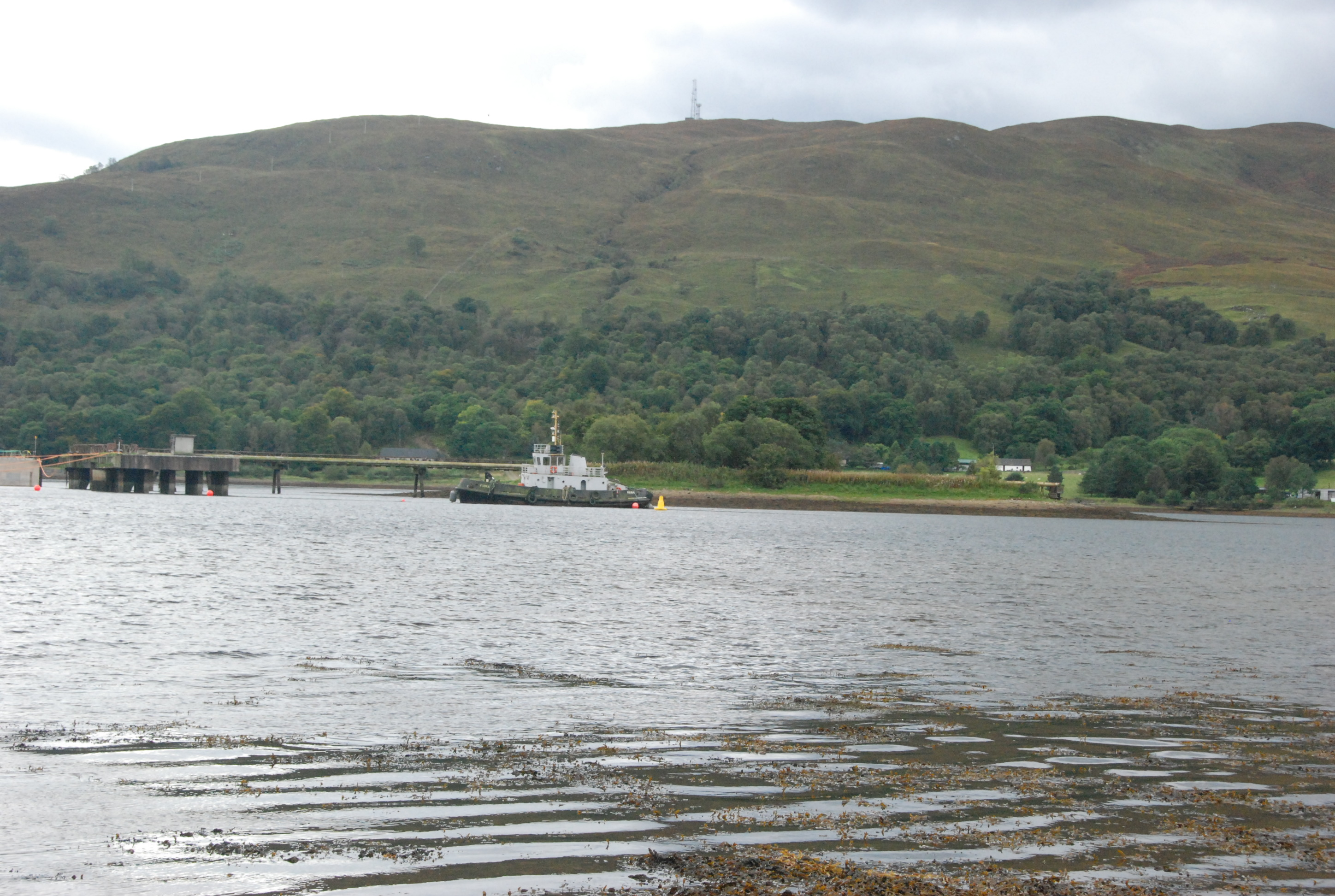
Eilean nan Craobh, once home to Lochiel, chief of Clan Cameron

Loch Eil and Loch Linnhe are joined by narrows at Annat where a paper mill once stood and where there is a now a large timber yard.
