= ShipSpace =

Maritime museum in Inverness, Scotland

Coordinates: 57°29′6.5″N 4°15′6.5″W

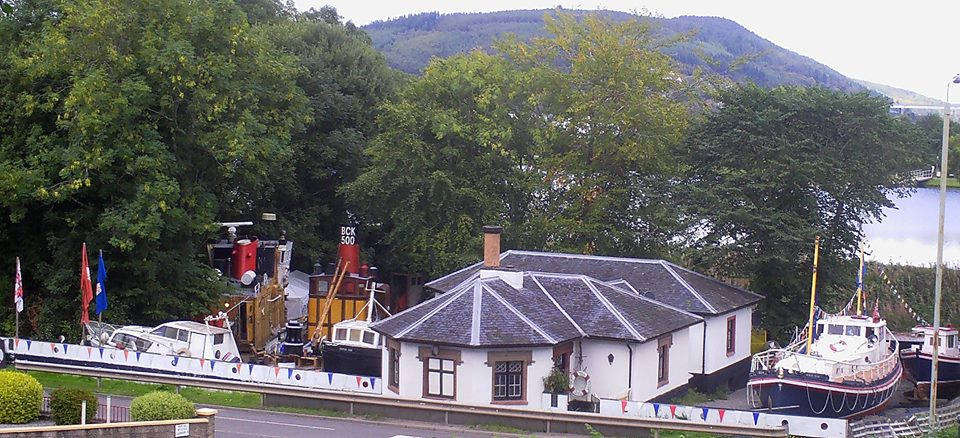
The museum from the front

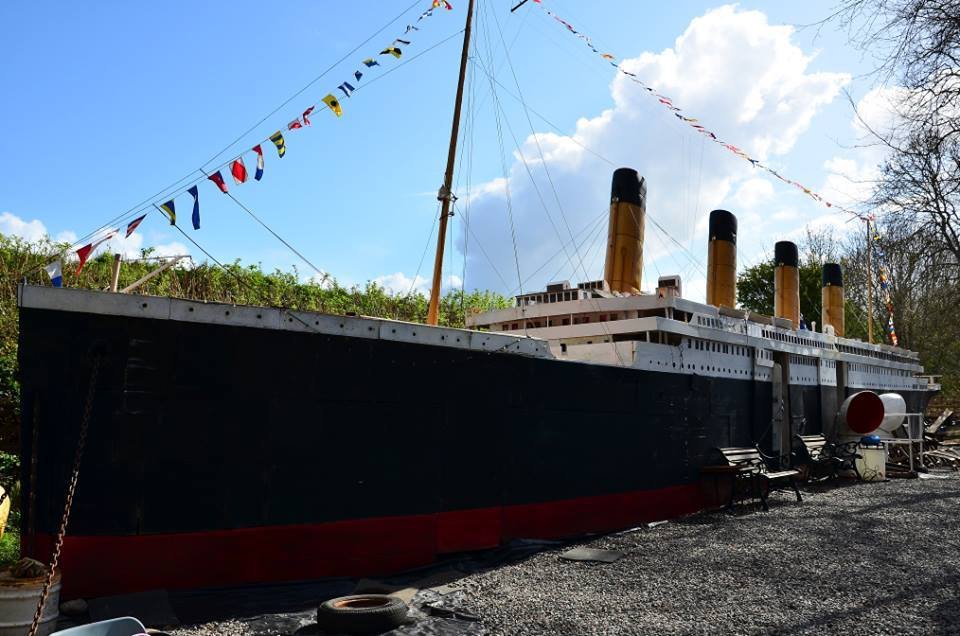
The 1:10 scale Titanic model

ShipSpace was an interactive maritime museum in Inverness, Scotland. The museum was situated along the historic Caledonian Canal at the Muirtown Basin. A 1:10 scale Titanic model constructed from 3 caravans was one of its main attractions, which contained three main rooms: a Parisian-styled café, a replica bridge, and a Marconi radio communications room.

Inside the museum building there were various interactive exhibits, photos, posters and information about the ship available as well as a rolling film that showed divers going down to the sunken ship.

Other exhibits included a replica of the Nautile submarine, one of the mini-submersibles that dove 3 miles down to the Titanic, the Guiding Star, a West-Coast creel fishing boat which was the last built at Inverness Thornbush slipway, a full-scale replica of the Star of Hope, the first herring drifter from Buckie, and a 45 ft RNLI Watson-class lifeboat.

The museum was in the east building, which had been constructed in the mode of the original west building, a toll house. The two buildings are separated by a corridor.

ShipSpace has been permanently closed since April 2018 following the death of the owner and curator Stan Fraser. The property continues to be the home of the Fraser family.
