= Admiralty Court Act 1840 =

Act of the Parliament of the United Kingdom

Admiralty Court Act 1840 (Note: The citation of this act by this short title was authorised by section 1 of, and the first schedule to, the Short Titles Act 1896. Due to the repeal of those provisions it is now authorised by section 19(2) of the Interpretation Act 1978.)
- Act of Parliament
- Parliament of the United Kingdom
- Long title: An Act to improve the Practice and extend the Jurisdiction of the High Court of Admiralty of England.
- Citation: 3 & 4 Vict. c. 65
- Territorial extent: United Kingdom

Dates
- Royal assent: 7 August 1840
- Commencement: 7 August 1840 (Note: The Acts of Parliament (Commencement) Act 1793.)
- Repealed: 1 January 1970
Other legislation
Amends	Privy Council Appeals Act 1832; Judicial Committee Act 1833; Civil Procedure Act 1833
Repealed by	Wreck and Salvage Act 1846; Statute Law Revision Act 1874 (No. 2); Civil Procedure Acts Repeal Act 1879; Statute Law Revision (No. 2) Act 1888; Statute Law Revision (No. 2) Act 1890; Statute Law Revision Act 1893; Administration of Justice Act 1925; Supreme Court of Judicature (Consolidation) Act 1925; Rules of the Supreme Court (Revision) 1962; Rules of the Supreme Court (Revision) 1965; Statute Law Revision Act 1969

Status: Repealed

Text of statute as originally enacted

The Admiralty Court Act 1840 (3 & 4 Vict. c. 65) was an act of the Parliament of the United Kingdom. It extended the jurisdiction of the High Court of Admiralty of England and Wales.

== Provisions ==
Consisting of the following;

- Whenever a vessel shall be arrested, etc., court to have jurisdiction over claims of mortgagees
- Court to decide questions of title, etc.
- The court in certain cases may adjudicate, etc.
- Evidence may be taken viva voce in open court
- Evidence may be taken viva voce before a commissioner
- Attendance of witnesses and production of papers may be compelled by subpoena
- Gaolers to receive prisoners committed by the Court of Admiralty or by Admiralty coroners
- Prisoners in contempt may be discharged
- Jurisdiction to try questions concerning booty of war
- Jurisdiction of courts of law and equity not taken away

The act was mentioned in articles concerning court proceedings dated 1973. Together with the Admiralty Court Acts 1861, the review of the law was specifically for the reason of a need for an increased number of shipping, salvage, and collision hearings. The Bill for the Act was supported by the then Judge of the High Court of Admiralty, Stephen Lushington.

== Case summaries ==
Steamships Trading Company Ltd v Owners of the Ship ‘Samarai’ [1988] PGNC 99; [1988-89] PNGLR 80 (28 February 1989)

== Subsequent developments ==
Sections 2, 11–17 and 19 of the act were repealed by section 2 of, and part I of the schedule to, the Civil Procedure Acts Repeal Act 1879 (42 & 43 Vict. c. 59), which came into force on 15 August 1879.

The whole act so far as unrepealed was repealed by section 1 of, and part VII of the schedule to, the Statute Law (Repeals) Act 1969, which came into force on 1 January 1970.

== See also ==
- Admiralty law
