= Clergy Reserves in Canada Act 1840 =

Act of the Parliament of the United Kingdom

- Act of Parliament
- Parliament of the United Kingdom
- Long title: An Act to provide for the Sale of the Clergy Reserves in the Province of Canada, and for the Distribution of the Proceeds thereof.
- Citation: 3 & 4 Vict. c. 78
- Territorial extent: United Kingdom

Dates
- Royal assent: 7 August 1840
- Commencement: 7 August 1840 (Note: The Acts of Parliament (Commencement) Act 1793.)
Other legislation
Amended by	Statute Law Revision Act 1874 (No. 2)

Status: Amended

Text of statute as originally enacted

The Clergy Reserves in Canada Act 1840 (3 & 4 Vict. c. 78) is an act of the Parliament of the United Kingdom passed at Westminster in the 3rd/4th year of Queen Victoria.

The Legislative Assembly of Upper Canada had passed a law to sell the reserves in 1840, but it was disallowed and displaced by the act. Although considered to be more favourable to the Anglican Church of Canada, the act as passed provided that only one-half of future sales would be dedicated on a 2:1 basis to the Anglican Church and the Church of Scotland, with the remaining moiety being distributed to all other churches according to their respective strengths. The administration of the reserve lands was transferred to the Crown Lands Department, where it was handled in a less contentious manner.

== Bibliography ==
- Lindsey, Charles; Rolph, John (1851). The clergy reserves: their history and present position, showing the systematic attempts that have been made to establish in connection with the state, a dominant church in Canada, With a full account of the rectories. Also an appendix containing Dr. Rolph's speech on the clergy reserves, delivered in 1836. Toronto: "North American" Press.
- Wilson, Alan (1968). The Clergy Reserves of Upper Canada: a Canadian mortmain. University of Toronto Press. OCLC 581126223.
- Wilson, Alan (1969). The Clergy Reserves of Upper Canada (PDF). Ottawa: Canadian Historical Association. ISBN 0-88798-057-0. Archived from the original (PDF) on 1 June 2017.
