= Wreck and Salvage Act 1846 =

Act of the Parliament of the United Kingdom

- Act of Parliament
- Parliament of the United Kingdom
- Long title: An Act for consolidating and amending the Laws relating to Wreck and Salvage.
- Citation: 9 & 10 Vict. c. 99
- Territorial extent: England and Wales; Ireland; (Note: Section 50.)

Dates
- Royal assent: 28 August 1846
- Commencement: 1 October 1846 (Note: Section 1.)
- Repealed: 1 May 1855
Other legislation
Amends	See § Repealed enactments
Repeals/revokes	See § Repealed enactments
Repealed by	Merchant Shipping Repeal Act 1854

Status: Repealed

Text of statute as originally enacted

The Wreck and Salvage Act 1846 (9 & 10 Vict. c. 99) was an act of the Parliament of the United Kingdom that consolidated enactments related to wrecking and marine salvage in England and Wales and Ireland.

== Provisions ==
=== Repealed enactments ===
Section 1 of the act repealed 13 enactments, listed in that section.

Citation	Short title	Description	Extent of repeal
13 Ann.c. 21 (Note: This is the citation in The Statutes of the Realm.)	Stranded Ships Act 1713	An Act passed in the Twelfth Year of the Reign of Her Majesty Queen Anne, intituled An Act for the preserving all such Ships and Goods thereof which shall happen to be forced on shore or stranded upon the Coasts of this Kingdom or any other of Her Majesty's Dominions.	The whole act.
4 Geo. 1. c. 12	Stranded Ships, etc. Act 1717	An Act passed in the Fourth Year of the Reign of His Majesty King George the First, intituled An Act for enforcing and making perpetual an Act of the Twelfth Year of Her late Majesty, intituled 'An Act for the preserving all such Ships and Goods thereof which shall happen to be forced on shore or stranded upon the Coasts of this Kingdom or any other of Her Majesty's Dominions;' and for inflicting the Punishment of Death on such as shall wilfully burn or destroy Ships	The whole act.
26 Geo. 2. c. 19	Stealing Shipwrecked Goods Act 1753	An Act passed in the Twenty-sixth Year of the Reign of His Majesty King George the Second, intituled An Act for enforcing the Laws against Persons who shall steal or detain shipwrecked Goods, and for the Relief of Persons suffering Losses thereby.	The whole act.
49 Geo. 3. c. 122	Frauds by Boatmen and others, etc. Act 1809	An Act passed in the Forty-ninth Year of the Reign of His Majesty King George the Third, intituled An Act for preventing Frauds and Depredations committed on Merchants, Shipowners, and Underwriters, by Boatmen and others; and also for remedying certain Defects relative to the Adjustment of Salvage in England under an Act made in the Twelfth Year of Queen Anne.	The whole act.
53 Geo. 3. c. 87	Frauds by Boatmen, etc. Act 1813	An Act passed in the Fifty-third Year of the Reign of His Majesty King George the Third, intituled An Act to continue for Seven Years Two Acts, passed in the Forty-eighth and Forty-ninth Years of His present Majesty, for preventing Frauds by Boatmen and others, and adjusting Salvage, and for extend- ing and amending the Laws relating to Wreck and Salvage.	The whole act.
53 Geo. 3. c.140	Cinque Ports Pilots Act 1813	An Act passed in the Fifty-third Year of the Reign of His Majesty King George the Third, intituled An Act to amend an Act made in the last Session of Parliament, intituled 'An Act for the more effectual Regulation of Pilots and of the Pilotage of Ships and Vessels on the Coast of England,' and for the Regulation of Boatmen employed in supplying Vessels with Pilots licensed under the said Act, so far as relates to the Coast of Kent within the Limits of the Cinque Ports.	The whole act.
1 & 2 Geo. 4. c. 75	Frauds by Boatmen, etc. Act 1821	An Act passed in the Session of Parliament holden in the First and Second Years of the Reign of His Majesty King George the Fourth, intituled An Act to continue and amend certain Acts for preventing Frauds and Depredations committed on Merchants, Shipowners, and Underwriters, by Boatmen and others; andalso for remedying certain Defects relative to the Adjustment of Salvage in England, under an Act made in the Twelfth Year of Queen Anne.	The whole act.
3 & 4 Vict. c. 65	Admiralty Court Act 1840	An Act passed in the Session of Parliament holden in the Third and Fourth Years of the Reign of Her present Majesty Queen Victoria, intituled An Act to improve the Practice and extend the Jurisdiction of the High Court ofAdmiralty of England.	As relates to Awards made by Justices and others in Salvage Cases, and Appeals therefrom. I.e., section 5.
8 & 9 Vict. c. 86	Customs (No. 3) Act 1845	An Act passed in the Session of Parliament holden in the Eighth and Ninth Years of Her present Majesty Queen Victoria, intituled An Act for the general Regulation of the Customs.	As relates to Persons being in possession of Goods Derelict, Jetsam, Flotsam, or Wreck, and to the Disposal of such Goods.
4 Geo. 1. c. 4 (I)	N/A	An Act passed in the Parliament of Ireland in the Fourth Year of the Reign of His Majesty King George the First, intituled An Act for the preserving all such Ships and Goods thereof which shall happen to be forced on shore or stranded upon the Coasts of this Kingdom.	The whole act.
11 Geo. 2. c. 9 (I)	N/A	An Act passed in the Parliament of Ireland in the Eleventh Year of the Reign of His Majesty King George the Second, intituled An Act for enforcing and making perpetual an Act, intituled 'An Act for the preserving of all such Ships and Goods thereof which shall happen to be forced on shore or stranded upon the Coasts of this Kingdom; and also for inflicting the Punishment ofDeath on all such as shall wilfully burn, sink, or destroy Ships.	As makes the said last-mentioned Act of the Fourth Year of the Reign of His Majesty King George the First perpetual.
17 Geo. 2. c. 11 (I)	N/A	An Act passed in the Parliament of Ireland in the Seventeenth Year of the Reign of His Majesty King George the Second, intituled An Act for the Amendment of the Law in relation to Forgery, and the Salvage of Ships and Goods stranded.	As relates to Salvage and Proceedings relating thereto.
23 & 24 Geo. 3. c. 48 (I)	N/A	An Act passed in the Session of the Parliament of Ireland holden in the Twenty-third and Twenty-fourth Years of the Reign of His Majesty King George the Third, intituled An Act for the Amendment of the Law in relation to the Salvage of Ships and Goods stranded, or in danger of perishing at Sea.	The whole act.

== Subsequent developments ==
The limited territorial extent of the act to England and Wales and Scotland meant that repealed enactments were repealed for Scotland by the Merchant Shipping Repeal Act 1854 (17 & 18 Vict. c. 120) and subsequent Statute Law Revision Acts, including:

- The Statute Law Revision Act 1861 (24 & 25 Vict. c. 101)

The whole act was repealed by section 4 of, and the schedule to, the Merchant Shipping Repeal Act 1854 (17 & 18 Vict. c. 120), which came into force on 1 May 1855.
