= Caledonian Canal Act 1840 =

Act of the Parliament of the United Kingdom

- Act of Parliament
- Parliament of the United Kingdom
- Long title: An Act to authorize the Commissioners of Her Majesty's Treasury to grant a Lease of the Caledonian Canal for a Term of Years, and to regulate the future Management thereof.
- Citation: 3 & 4 Vict. c. 41
- Territorial extent: United Kingdom

Dates
- Royal assent: 4 August 1840
- Commencement: 4 August 1840 (Note: The Acts of Parliament (Commencement) Act 1793.)

Status: Current legislation

Text of statute as originally enacted

The Caledonian Canal Act 1840 (3 & 4 Vict. c. 41) is an act of the Parliament of the United Kingdom that was passed on 4 August 1840 "to authorize the Commissioners of Her Majesty's Treasury" to allow for the leasing and management of the Caledonian Canal in Scotland.

The canal, which extends from the Moray Firth to Loch Linnhe, was completed on 30 October 1822 and opened the same year.

The Caledonian Canal Act 1803 (43 Geo. 3. c. 102) establishing the Caledonian Canal Commissioners had been passed on 27 July 1803, and the commissioners were made into a corporate body by the Caledonian Canal Act 1848 (11 & 12 Vict. c. 54). Both this canal and the Crinan Canal were subsequently privately leased following the Caledonian and Crinan Canals Amendment Act 1860 (23 & 24 Vict. c. 46).
