= List of acts of the Parliament of the United Kingdom from 1840 =

This is a complete list of acts of the Parliament of the United Kingdom for the year 1840.

Note that the first parliament of the United Kingdom was held in 1801; parliaments between 1707 and 1800 were either parliaments of Great Britain or of Ireland). For acts passed up until 1707, see the list of acts of the Parliament of England and the list of acts of the Parliament of Scotland. For acts passed from 1707 to 1800, see the list of acts of the Parliament of Great Britain. See also the list of acts of the Parliament of Ireland.

For acts of the devolved parliaments and assemblies in the United Kingdom, see the list of acts of the Scottish Parliament, the list of acts of the Northern Ireland Assembly, and the list of acts and measures of Senedd Cymru; see also the list of acts of the Parliament of Northern Ireland.

The number shown after each act's title is its chapter number. Acts passed before 1963 are cited using this number, preceded by the year(s) of the reign during which the relevant parliamentary session was held; thus the Union with Ireland Act 1800 is cited as "39 & 40 Geo. 3 c. 67", meaning the 67th act passed during the session that started in the 39th year of the reign of George III and which finished in the 40th year of that reign. Note that the modern convention is to use Arabic numerals in citations (thus "41 Geo. 3" rather than "41 Geo. III"). Acts of the last session of the Parliament of Great Britain and the first session of the Parliament of the United Kingdom are both cited as "41 Geo. 3".

Some of these acts have a short title. Some of these acts have never had a short title. Some of these acts have a short title given to them by later acts, such as by the Short Titles Act 1896.

== 3 & 4 Vict. ==
The third session of the 13th Parliament of the United Kingdom, which met from 16 January 1840 to 11 August 1840.

=== Public general acts ===
| Short title | Citation | Royal assent |
Long title
| Naturalization of Prince Albert Act 1840 (repealed) | 3 & 4 Vict. c. 1 | 24 January 1840 |
An Act for exhibiting a Bill in this present Parliament for naturalizing His Serene Highness Prince Albert of Saxe Coburg and Gotha. (Repealed by Statute Law Revision Act 1874 (No. 2) (37 & 38 Vict. c. 96))
| Naturalization of Prince Albert (No. 2) Act 1840 (repealed) | 3 & 4 Vict. c. 2 | 7 February 1840 |
An Act for the Naturalization of His Serene Highness Prince Albert of Saxe Coburg and Gotha. (Repealed by Statute Law (Repeals) Act 1977 (c. 18))
| Prince Albert's Annuity Act 1840 (repealed) | 3 & 4 Vict. c. 3 | 7 February 1840 |
An Act for enabling Her Majesty to grant an Annuity to His Serene Highness Prince Albert of Saxe Coburg and Gotha. (Repealed by Statute Law Revision Act 1874 (No. 2) (37 & 38 Vict. c. 96))
| Supply Act 1840 (repealed) | 3 & 4 Vict. c. 4 | 24 February 1840 |
An Act to apply the Sum of Two Millions to the Service of the Year One thousand eight hundred and forty. (Repealed by Statute Law Revision Act 1874 (No. 2) (37 & 38 Vict. c. 96))
| Horse Racing Act 1840 (repealed) | 3 & 4 Vict. c. 5 | 23 March 1840 |
An Act to repeal so much of an Act passed in the Thirteenth Year of the Reign of His King George the Second, (Note: Gaming Act 1739 (13 Geo. 2. c. 19)) intituled "An Act to restrain and prevent the excessive Increase of Races; and for amending an Act made in the last Session of Parliament, (Note: Gaming Act 1738 (12 Geo. 2. c. 28)) intituled 'An Act for more effectual preventing of excessive and deceitful Gaming,'" as relates to the Subject of Racing. (Repealed by Statute Law Revision Act 1874 (No. 2) (37 & 38 Vict. c. 96))
| Mutiny Act 1840 (repealed) | 3 & 4 Vict. c. 6 | 3 April 1840 |
An Act for punishing Mutiny and Desertion and for the better Payment of the Army and their Quarters. (Repealed by Statute Law Revision Act 1874 (No. 2) (37 & 38 Vict. c. 96))
| Supply Act 1840 (repealed) | 3 & 4 Vict. c. 7 | 3 April 1840 |
Act to apply the Sum of Eight Millions out of the Consolidated Fund to the Service of the Year One thousand eight hundred and forty. (Repealed by Statute Law Revision Act 1874 (No. 2) (37 & 38 Vict. c. 96))
| Marine Mutiny Act 1840 (repealed) | 3 & 4 Vict. c. 8 | 3 April 1840 |
An Act for the Regulation of Her Majesty's Royal Marine Forces while on shore. (Repealed by Statute Law Revision Act 1874 (No. 2) (37 & 38 Vict. c. 96))
| Parliamentary Papers Act 1840 | 3 & 4 Vict. c. 9 | 14 April 1840 |
An Act to give summary Protection to Persons employed in the Publication of Parliamentary Papers.
| Advances for Public Works Act 1840 (repealed) | 3 & 4 Vict. c. 10 | 14 April 1840 |
An Act to authorize the Issue of Exchequer Bills for Public Works and Fisheries and Employment of the Poor. (Repealed by Public Works Loans Act 1875 (38 & 39 Vict. c. 89))
| Lord Seaton's Annuity Act 1840 (repealed) | 3 & 4 Vict. c. 11 | 19 May 1840 |
An Act to settle an Annuity on Lord Seaton and the Two next surviving Heirs Male of the Body of the said Lord Seaton to whom the Title of Lord Seaton shall descend in consideration of his important Services. (Repealed by Statute Law Revision Act 1953 (2 & 3 Eliz. 2. c. 5))
| Exchequer Bills Act 1840 (repealed) | 3 & 4 Vict. c. 12 | 19 May 1840 |
An Act for raising the Sum of Eleven Millions by Exchequer Bills, for the Service of the Year One thousand eight hundred and forty. (Repealed by Statute Law Revision Act 1874 (No. 2) (37 & 38 Vict. c. 96))
| Tithes (Ireland) Act 1840 (repealed) | 3 & 4 Vict. c. 13 | 19 May 1840 |
An Act to amend an Act of the First and Second Years of the Reign of Her present Majesty, (Note: Tithe Rentcharge (Ireland) Act 1838 (1 & 2 Vict. c. 109)) to abolish Compositions for Tithes in Ireland, and to substitute Rent-charges in lieu thereof. (Repealed by Statute Law Revision Act 1874 (No. 2) (37 & 38 Vict. c. 96))
| Insolvent Debtors (Ireland) Act 1840 (repealed) | 3 & 4 Vict. c. 14 | 19 May 1840 |
An Act to continue for One Year, and to the End of the next Session of Parliament, the Acts for the Relief of Insolvent Debtors in Ireland. (Repealed by Statute Law Revision Act 1874 (No. 2) (37 & 38 Vict. c. 96))
| Tithe Act 1840 (repealed) | 3 & 4 Vict. c. 15 | 4 June 1840 |
An Act further to explain and amend the Acts for the Commutation of Tithes in England and Wales. (Repealed by Statute Law (Repeals) Act 1998 (c. 43))
| Indemnity Act 1840 (repealed) | 3 & 4 Vict. c. 16 | 19 June 1840 |
An Act to indemnify such Persons in the United Kingdom as have omitted to qualify themselves for Offices and Employments, and for extending the Time limited for those Purposes respectively until the Twenty-fifth Day of March One thousand eight hundred and forty-one; and for the Relief of Clerks to Attornies and Solicitors in certain Cases. (Repealed by Promissory Oaths Act 1871 (34 & 35 Vict. c. 48))
| Excise Act 1840 (repealed) | 3 & 4 Vict. c. 17 | 19 June 1840 |
An Act for granting to Her Majesty Duties of Customs, Excise, and Assessed Taxes. (Repealed by Customs and Excise Act 1952 (15 & 16 Geo. 6 & 1 Eliz. 2. c. 44))
| Tobacco Act 1840 (repealed) | 3 & 4 Vict. c. 18 | 3 July 1840 |
An Act to discontinue the Excise Survey on Tobacco, and to provide other Regulations in lieu thereof. (Repealed by Customs and Excise Act 1952 (15 & 16 Geo. 6 & 1 Eliz. 2. c. 44))
| Customs Act 1840 (repealed) | 3 & 4 Vict. c. 19 | 3 July 1840 |
An Act for granting to Her Majesty an additional Duty of Customs on Timber. (Repealed by Statute Law Revision Act 1874 (No. 2) (37 & 38 Vict. c. 96))
| Queen Anne's Bounty Act 1840 | 3 & 4 Vict. c. 20 | 3 July 1840 |
An Act to amend an Act passed in the First Year of the Reign of His late Majesty King George the First, intituled "An Act for rendering more effectual Her late Majesty's gracious Intentions for the augmentation of the Maintenance of the Poor Clergy"; (Note: Queen Anne's Bounty Act 1714 (1 Geo. 1. St. 2. c. 10)) and to render valid certain Agreements which have been made in pursuance of the said Act; and for other purposes.
| Passenger Ships Act 1840 (repealed) | 3 & 4 Vict. c. 21 | 3 July 1840 |
An Act to extend to the British Colonies in the West Indies an Act passed in the Fifth and Sixth Year of His late Majesty King William the Fourth, (Note: Merchant Vessels, etc. Act 1835 (5 & 6 Will. 4. c. 53)) for regulating the Carriage of Passengers in Merchant Vessels. (Repealed by Passengers Act 1842 (5 & 6 Vict. c. 107))
| Duties on Glass Act 1840 (repealed) | 3 & 4 Vict. c. 22 | 3 July 1840 |
An Act to impose upon Broad or Spread Glass the same Duties of Excise that are payable upon German Sheet Glass. (Repealed by Statute Law Revision Act 1874 (No. 2) (37 & 38 Vict. c. 96))
| Sugar Duties Act 1840 (repealed) | 3 & 4 Vict. c. 23 | 3 July 1840 |
An Act for granting to Her Majesty, until the Fifth Day of July One thousand eight hundred and forty-one, certain Duties on Sugar imported into the United Kingdom, for the Service of the Year One thousand eight hundred and forty. (Repealed by Statute Law Revision Act 1874 (No. 2) (37 & 38 Vict. c. 96))
| Costs of Action of Trespass Act 1840 (repealed) | 3 & 4 Vict. c. 24 | 3 July 1840 |
An Act to repeal Part of an Act of the Forty-third Year of the Reign of Queen Elizabeth, (Note: Frivolous Suits Act 1601 (43 Eliz. 1. c. 6)) intituled "An Act to avoid trifling and frivolous Suits in Law in Her Majesty's Courts in Westminster," and of an Act of the Twenty-second and Twenty-third Year of the Reign of King Charles the Second, (Note: Duties on Law Proceedings Act 1670 (22 & 23 Cha. 2. c. 9)) intituled "An Act for laying Impositions on Proceedings at Law;" and to make further Provisions in lieu thereof. (Repealed by Civil Procedure Acts Repeal Act 1879 (42 & 43 Vict. c. 59))
| Prisons Act 1840 (repealed) | 3 & 4 Vict. c. 25 | 3 July 1840 |
An Act to amend the Act (Note: Prisons Act 1839 (2 & 3 Vict. c. 56)) for the better ordering of Prisons. (Repealed by Prison Act 1865 (28 & 29 Vict. c. 126))
| Evidence Act 1840 (repealed) | 3 & 4 Vict. c. 26 | 3 July 1840 |
An Act to remove Doubts as to the Competency of Persons, being rated Inhabitants of any Parish, to give Evidence in certain Cases. (Repealed by Statute Law Revision Act 1874 (No. 2) (37 & 38 Vict. c. 96))
| Scotch and Irish Paupers Act 1840 (repealed) | 3 & 4 Vict. c. 27 | 3 July 1840 |
An Act to continue to the First Day of August One thousand eight hundred and forty-three, and from thence to the End of the then next Session of Parliament, Two Acts relating to the Removal of poor Persons born in Scotland and Ireland, and chargeable to Parishes in England. (Repealed by Statute Law Revision Act 1874 (No. 2) (37 & 38 Vict. c. 96))
| Watch Rates in Boroughs Act 1840 (repealed) | 3 & 4 Vict. c. 28 | 23 July 1840 |
An Act to explain and amend an Act of the Second and Third Years of Her present Majesty (Note: Borough Watch Rates Act 1839 (2 & 3 Vict. c. 28)) for more equally assessing and levying Watch Rates in certain Boroughs. (Repealed by Municipal Corporations Act 1882 (45 & 46 Vict. c. 50))
| Vaccination Act 1840 (repealed) | 3 & 4 Vict. c. 29 | 23 July 1840 |
An Act to extend the Practice of Vaccination. (Repealed for England and Wales by Vaccination Act 1867 (30 & 31 Vict. c. 84) and for Ireland by Statute Law Revision Act 1875 (38 & 39 Vict. c. 66))
| Manchester Police Act 1840 (repealed) | 3 & 4 Vict. c. 30 | 23 July 1840 |
An Act for the more equal Assessment of Police Rates in Manchester, Birmingham, and Bolton, and to make better Provision for the Police in Birmingham, for One Year, and to the End of the then next Session of Parliament. (Repealed by Statute Law Revision Act 1874 (No. 2) (37 & 38 Vict. c. 96))
| Inclosure Act 1840 (repealed) | 3 & 4 Vict. c. 31 | 23 July 1840 |
An Act to extend the Powers and Provisions of the several Acts relating to the Inclosure of Open and Arable Fields in England and Wales. (Repealed by Commons Act 1899 (62 & 63 Vict. c. 30))
| Importation Act 1840 (repealed) | 3 & 4 Vict. c. 32 | 23 July 1840 |
An Act to continue for One Year, and from thence until the End of the then next Session of Parliament, the several Acts relating to the Importation and keeping of Arms and Gunpowder in Ireland. (Repealed by Statute Law Revision Act 1874 (No. 2) (37 & 38 Vict. c. 96))
| Scottish Episcopal and other Clergy Act 1840 (repealed) | 3 & 4 Vict. c. 33 | 23 July 1840 |
An Act to make certain Provisions and Regulations in respect to the Exercise, within England and Ireland, of their Office by the Bishops and Clergy of the Protestant Episcopal Church in Scotland; and also to extend such Provisions and Regulations to the Bishops and Clergy of the Protestant Episcopal Church in the United States of America; and also to make further Regulations in respect to Bishops and Clergy other than those of the United Church of England and Ireland. (Repealed by Colonial Clergy Act 1874 (37 & 38 Vict. c. 77))
| Masters in Chancery Act 1840 (repealed) | 3 & 4 Vict. c. 34 | 23 July 1840 |
An Act for making Provision as to the Office of Master in Chancery in certain Cases. (Repealed by Statute Law Revision Act 1861 (24 & 25 Vict. c. 101))
| British North America Act 1840 or the Act of Union 1840 | 3 & 4 Vict. c. 35 | 23 July 1840 |
An Act to reunite the Provinces of Upper and Lower Canada, and for the Government of Canada.
| Timber Ships, British North America Act 1840 (repealed) | 3 & 4 Vict. c. 36 | 23 July 1840 |
An Act for preventing Ships clearing out from a British North American Port loading any Part of their Cargo of Timber of Timber upon Deck. (Repealed by Statute Law Revision Act 1874 (No. 2) (37 & 38 Vict. c. 96))
| Mutiny, East Indies Act 1840 (repealed) | 3 & 4 Vict. c. 37 | 4 August 1840 |
An Act to consolidate and amend the Laws for punishing Mutiny and Desertion of Officers and Soldiers in the Service of the East India Company, and for providing for the Observance of Discipline in the Indian Navy, and to amend the Laws for regulating the Payment of Regimental Debts, and the Distribution of the Effects of Officers and Soldiers dying in Service. (Repealed by Statute Law Revision Act 1874 (No. 2) (37 & 38 Vict. c. 96))
| Assessed Taxes Act 1840 (repealed) | 3 & 4 Vict. c. 38 | 4 August 1840 |
An Act to continue Compositions for Assessed Taxes until the Fifth Day of April One thousand eight hundred and forty two. (Repealed by Revenue Act 1869 (32 & 33 Vict. c. 14))
| Turnpikes Act 1840 (repealed) | 3 & 4 Vict. c. 39 | 4 August 1840 |
An Act to authorize Trustees or Commissioners of Turnpike Roads to appoint Meetings for executing their Trusts in certain Cases. (Repealed by Statute Law (Repeals) Act 1981 (c. 19))
| West India Islands Relief Act 1840 (repealed) | 3 & 4 Vict. c. 40 | 4 August 1840 |
An Act to amend Two Acts of His late Majesty King William the Fourth, for the Relief of certain of Her Majesty's Colonies and Plantations in the West Indies. (Repealed by West India Loan Act 1879 (42 & 43 Vict. c. 16))
| Caledonian Canal Act 1840 | 3 & 4 Vict. c. 41 | 4 August 1840 |
An Act to authorize the Commissioners of Her Majesty's Treasury to grant a Lease of the Caledonian Canal for a Term of Years, and to regulate the future Management thereof.
| Poor Law Commission Act 1840 (repealed) | 3 & 4 Vict. c. 42 | 4 August 1840 |
An Act to continue the Poor Law Commission until the Thirty-first Day of December One thousand eight hundred and forty-one. (Repealed by Statute Law Revision Act 1874 (No. 2) (37 & 38 Vict. c. 96))
| Repair of Blenheim Palace Act 1840 (repealed) | 3 & 4 Vict. c. 43 | 4 August 1840 |
An Act for repairing Blenheim Palace. (Repealed by Statute Law Revision (No. 2) Act 1893 (56 & 57 Vict. c. 54))
| Prisons (Ireland) Act 1840 (repealed) | 3 & 4 Vict. c. 44 | 4 August 1840 |
An Act to amend an Act of the Seventh Year of King George the Fourth, (Note: Prisons (Ireland) Act 1826 (7 Geo. 4. c. 74)) for consolidating and amending the Laws relating to Prisons in Ireland. (Repealed by Prisons (Ireland) Act 1856 (19 & 20 Vict. c. 68), Statute Law Revision Act 1874 (No. 2) (37 & 38 Vict. c. 96), Statute Law Revision (No. 2) Act 1888 (51 & 52 Vict. c. 57), Statute Law Revision (No. 2) Act 1890 (53 & 54 Vict. c. 51) and Prison Act (Northern Ireland) 1953 (c. 18 (N.I.)))
| Turnpike Acts Continuance Act 1840 (repealed) | 3 & 4 Vict. c. 45 | 4 August 1840 |
An Act to continue for One Year from the passing of this Act, and thenceforth until the End of the then next Session of Parliament, the several Acts for regulating the Turnpike Roads in Ireland. (Repealed by Statute Law Revision Act 1874 (No. 2) (37 & 38 Vict. c. 96))
| Turnpike Acts, Ireland, Continuance Act 1840 (repealed) | 3 & 4 Vict. c. 46 | 4 August 1840 |
An Act to continue for One Year from the passing of this Act, and thenceforth until the End of the then next Session of Parliament, the several Acts for regulating the Turnpike Roads in Ireland. (Repealed by Statute Law Revision Act 1874 (No. 2) (37 & 38 Vict. c. 96))
| Parliamentary Elections Act 1840 (repealed) | 3 & 4 Vict. c. 47 | 4 August 1840 |
An Act to repeal so much of an Act of the Ninth Year of the Reign of Her late Majesty Queen Anne (Note: Municipal Offices Act 1710 (9 Ann. c. 25)) as prevents the Re-election of Mayors of Parliamentary Boroughs and other annual Returning Officers. (Repealed by Statute Law Revision Act 1874 (No. 2) (37 & 38 Vict. c. 96))
| Entail Sites Act 1840 (repealed) | 3 & 4 Vict. c. 48 | 4 August 1840 |
An Act to enable Proprietors of Entailed Estates in Scotland to feu or lease on long Leases Portions of the same for the building of Churches and Schools, and for Dwelling Houses and Gardens for the Ministers and Masters thereof. (Repealed by Abolition of Feudal Tenure etc. (Scotland) Act 2000 (asp 5))
| Duties on Soap Act 1840 (repealed) | 3 & 4 Vict. c. 49 | 4 August 1840 |
An Act to consolidate and amend the Laws for collecting the Duties of Excise on Soap made in Great Britain. (Repealed by Statute Law Revision Act 1861 (24 & 25 Vict. c. 101))
| Canals (Offences) Act 1840 (repealed) | 3 & 4 Vict. c. 50 | 4 August 1840 |
An Act to provide for keeping the Peace on Canals and Navigable Rivers. (Repealed by Police and Criminal Evidence Act 1984 (c. 60))
| Turnpike Tolls Act 1840 (repealed) | 3 & 4 Vict. c. 51 | 4 August 1840 |
An Act to amend and explain the general Turnpike Acts, so far as relates to the Toll payable on Carriages or Horses laden with Lime for the improvement of Land. (Repealed by Statute Law (Repeals) Act 1981 (c. 19))
| Regency Act 1840 (repealed) | 3 & 4 Vict. c. 52 | 4 August 1840 |
An Act to provide for the Administration of the Government in case the Crown should descend Issue of Her Majesty whilst such Issue shall be under the Age of Eighteen Years, and for the Care and Guardianship of such Issue. (Repealed by Statute Law Revision Act 1874 (No. 2) (37 & 38 Vict. c. 96))
| Newgate Gaol, Dublin Act 1840 (repealed) | 3 & 4 Vict. c. 53 | 4 August 1840 |
An Act for vacating any Presentment for rebuilding the Gaol of Newgate in Dublin, and vacating any Contract between the Commissioners for rebuilding the said Gaol and the Contractor. (Repealed by Statute Law Revision Act 1874 (No. 2) (37 & 38 Vict. c. 96))
| Insane Prisoners Act 1840 (repealed) | 3 & 4 Vict. c. 54 | 4 August 1840 |
An Act for making further Provision for the Confinement and Maintenance of Insane Prisoners. (Repealed by Criminal Lunatics Act 1884 (47 & 48 Vict. c. 64))
| Settled Estates Drainage Act 1840 (repealed) | 3 & 4 Vict. c. 55 | 4 August 1840 |
An Act to enable the Owners of Settled Estates to defray the Expence of draining the same by way of Mortgage. (Repealed by Land Drainage Act 1845 (8 & 9 Vict. c. 56))
| East India Trade Act 1840 (repealed) | 3 & 4 Vict. c. 56 | 7 August 1840 |
An Act further to regulate the Trade of Ships built and trading within the Limits of the East India Company's Charter. (Repealed by Statute Law Revision (No. 2) Act 1890 (53 & 54 Vict. c. 51))
| Sugar Duties Act 1840 (repealed) | 3 & 4 Vict. c. 57 | 7 August 1840 |
An Act to impose Duties of Excise on Sugar manufactured in the United Kingdom. (Repealed by Customs and Inland Revenue Act 1874 (37 & 38 Vict. c. 16))
| River Poddle Act 1840 | 3 & 4 Vict. c. 58 | 7 August 1840 |
An Act to amend the Acts relating to the River Poddle in the County and City of Dublin.
| Evidence (Scotland) Act 1840 | 3 & 4 Vict. c. 59 | 7 August 1840 |
An Act for the Amendment of the Law of Evidence in Scotland.
| Church Building Act 1840 (repealed) | 3 & 4 Vict. c. 60 | 7 August 1840 |
An Act to further amend the Church Building Acts. (Repealed by Statute Law (Repeals) Act 1974 (c. 22) and for the Isle of Man by Isle of Man (Church Building and New Parishes) Act 1897 (60 & 61 Vict. c. 33) and for the provinces of Canterbury and York except the Channel Islands by New Parishes Measure 1943 (No. 1))
| Beerhouse Act 1840 (repealed) | 3 & 4 Vict. c. 61 | 7 August 1840 |
An Act to amend the Acts relating to the general Sale of Beer and Cider by Retail in England. (Repealed by Customs and Excise Act 1952 (15 & 16 Geo. 6 & 1 Eliz. 2. c. 44))
| New South Wales and Van Diemen's Land Act 1840 or the New Zealand Government Act 1840 (repealed) | 3 & 4 Vict. c. 62 | 7 August 1840 |
An Act to continue until the Thirty-first Day of December One thousand eight hundred and forty-one, and to the End of the then next Session of Parliament, and to extend, the Provisions of an Act (Note: Australian Courts Act 1828 (9 Geo. 4. c. 83)) to provide for the Administration of Justice in New South Wales and Van Diemen's Land, and for the more effectual Government thereof, and for other Purposes relating thereto. (Repealed by Statute Law Revision Act 1891 (54 & 55 Vict. c. 67))
| Isle of Man Harbours Act 1840 (repealed) | 3 & 4 Vict. c. 63 | 7 August 1840 |
An Act to extend the Powers of the Commissioners appointed for the Execution of Two Acts for supporting the several Harbours and Sea Ports in the Isle of Man. (Repealed by Isle of Man Harbours Act 1872 (35 & 36 Vict. c. 23))
| Slave Trade Suppression Act 1840 (repealed) | 3 & 4 Vict. c. 64 | 7 August 1840 |
An Act to continue until Eight Months after the Commencement of the next Session of Parliament, an Act (Note: Slave Trade Suppression (No. 2) Act 1838 (1 & 2 Vict. c. 102)) for authorizing Her Majesty to carry into immediate Execution, by Orders in Council, any Treaties for the Suppression of the Slave Trade. (Repealed by Slave Trade Act 1873 (36 & 37 Vict. c. 88))
| Admiralty Court Act 1840 (repealed) | 3 & 4 Vict. c. 65 | 7 August 1840 |
An Act to improve the Practice and extend the Jurisdiction of the High Court of Admiralty of England. (Repealed by Wreck and Salvage Act 1846 (9 & 10 Vict. c. 99), Statute Law Revision Act 1874 (No. 2) (37 & 38 Vict. c. 96), Civil Procedure Acts Repeal Act 1879 (42 & 43 Vict. c. 59), Statute Law Revision (No. 2) Act 1888 (51 & 52 Vict. c. 57), Statute Law Revision (No. 2) Act 1890 (53 & 54 Vict. c. 51), Statute Law Revision Act 1893 (56 & 57 Vict. c. 14), Administration of Justice Act 1925 (15 & 16 Geo. 5. c. 28), Supreme Court of Judicature (Consolidation) Act 1925 (15 & 16 Geo. 5. c. 49), Rules of the Supreme Court (Revision) 1962 (SI 1962/2145), Rules of the Supreme Court (Revision) 1965 (SI 1965/1776) and Statute Law (Repeals) Act 1969 (c. 52))
| High Court of Admiralty (England) Act 1840 (repealed) | 3 & 4 Vict. c. 66 | 7 August 1840 |
An Act to make Provision for the Judge, Registrar, and Marshal of the High Court of Admiralty of England. (Repealed by Civil Procedure Acts Repeal Act 1879 (42 & 43 Vict. c. 59) and Supreme Court of Judicature (Officers) Act 1879 (42 & 43 Vict. c. 78))
| Slave Trade Suppression, Treaty with Venezuela Act 1840 (repealed) | 3 & 4 Vict. c. 67 | 7 August 1840 |
An Act for carrying into effect the Treaty between Her Majesty and the Republic of Venezuela, for the Suppression of the Slave Trade. (Repealed by Slave Trade Act 1873 (36 & 37 Vict. c. 88))
| Pilots, etc. Act 1840 (repealed) | 3 & 4 Vict. c. 68 | 7 August 1840 |
An Act to enable Her Majesty in Council to authorize Ships and Vessels belonging to Countries having Treaties of Reciprocity with the United Kingdom to be piloted, in certain Cases, without having a licensed Pilot on board; and also to regulate the Mode in which Pilot Boats shall be painted and distinguished. (Repealed by Merchant Shipping Repeal Act 1854 (17 & 18 Vict. c. 120))
| Fisheries, Convention with France Act 1840 (repealed) | 3 & 4 Vict. c. 69 | 7 August 1840 |
An Act to continue, for Six Months after the Commencement of the next Session of Parliament, an Act of the last Session of Parliament, (Note: Fisheries, Convention with France Act 1839 (2 & 3 Vict. c. 96)) for carrying into effect a Convention between Her Majesty and the King of the French, relative to the Fisheries on the Coasts of the British Islands and of France. (Repealed by Statute Law Revision Act 1874 (No. 2) (37 & 38 Vict. c. 96))
| Militia Pay Act 1840 (repealed) | 3 & 4 Vict. c. 70 | 7 August 1840 |
An Act to defray the Charge of the Pay, Clothing, and contingent and other Expences of the Disembodied Militia in Great Britain and Ireland; and to grant Allowances in certain Cases to Subaltern Officers, Adjutants, Paymasters, Quartermasters, Surgeons, Assistant Surgeons, Surgeons Mates, and Serjeant Majors of the Militia, until the First Day of July One thousand eight hundred and forty-one. (Repealed by Statute Law Revision Act 1874 (No. 2) (37 & 38 Vict. c. 96))
| Militia Ballots Suspension Act 1840 (repealed) | 3 & 4 Vict. c. 71 | 7 August 1840 |
An Act to suspend until the End of the next Session of Parliament the making of Lists and the Ballots and Enrolments for the Militia of the United Kingdom. (Repealed by Statute Law Revision Act 1874 (No. 2) (37 & 38 Vict. c. 96))
| Marriage Act 1840 (repealed) | 3 & 4 Vict. c. 72 | 7 August 1840 |
An Act to provide for the Solemnization of Marriages in the Districts in or near which the Parties reside. (Repealed by Marriage Act 1949 (12, 13 & 14 Geo. 6. c. 76))
| Friendly Societies Act 1840 (repealed) | 3 & 4 Vict. c. 73 | 7 August 1840 |
An Act to explain and amend the Acts relating to Friendly Societies. (Repealed by Friendly Societies Act 1855 (18 & 19 Vict. c. 63))
| Oyster Fisheries (Scotland) Act 1840 | 3 & 4 Vict. c. 74 | 7 August 1840 |
An Act for the better Protection of the Oyster Fisheries in Scotland.
| National Debt Act 1840 (repealed) | 3 & 4 Vict. c. 75 | 7 August 1840 |
An Act to regulate the Repayment of certain Sums advanced by the Governor and Company of the Bank of Ireland for the Public Service. (Repealed by Statute Law Revision Act 1870 (33 & 34 Vict. c. 69))
| County of Roscommon Act 1840 | 3 & 4 Vict. c. 76 | 7 August 1840 |
An Act to empower the Lord Lieutenant of Ireland to annex certain Townlands to the County of Roscommon.
| Grammar Schools Act 1840 (repealed) | 3 & 4 Vict. c. 77 | 7 August 1840 |
An Act for improving the Condition and extending the Benefits of Grammar Schools. (Repealed by Charities Act 1960 (8 & 9 Eliz. 2. c. 58))
| Clergy Reserves in Canada Act 1840 | 3 & 4 Vict. c. 78 | 7 August 1840 |
An Act to provide for the Sale of the Clergy Reserves in the Province of Canada, and for the Distribution of the Proceeds thereof.
| Stamps Act 1840 (repealed) | 3 & 4 Vict. c. 79 | 7 August 1840 |
An Act to amend the Law relating to the Admission of Attornies and Solicitors to practise in the Courts of Law and Equity in Ireland. (Repealed by Inland Revenue Repeal Act 1870 (33 & 34 Vict. c. 99))
| Insolvent Debtors, India Act 1840 (repealed) | 3 & 4 Vict. c. 80 | 7 August 1840 |
An Act to continue until the First Day of March One thousand eight hundred and forty-five, and from thence to the End of the then next Session of Parliament, the several Acts relating to Insolvent Debtors in India. (Repealed by Statute Law Revision Act 1874 (No. 2) (37 & 38 Vict. c. 96))
| Parliamentary Elections Act 1840 (repealed) | 3 & 4 Vict. c. 81 | 7 August 1840 |
An Act to define the Notice of Elections of Members to serve in Parliament for Cities, Towns, and Boroughs in England. (Repealed by Parliamentary Elections Act 1853 (16 & 17 Vict. c. 68))
| Judgments Act 1840 (repealed) | 3 & 4 Vict. c. 82 | 7 August 1840 |
An Act for further amending the Act (Note: Judgments Act 1838 (1 & 2 Vict. c. 110)) for abolishing Arrest on Mesne Process in Civil Actions. (Repealed by Rules of the Supreme Court (Revision) 1965 (SI 1965/1776))
| Usury Act 1840 (repealed) | 3 & 4 Vict. c. 83 | 7 August 1840 |
An Act to continue, until the First Day of January One thousand eight hundred and forty-three, an Act of the last Session of Parliament, (Note: Usury Act 1839 (2 & 3 Vict. c. 37)) for amending and extending the Provisions of an Act of the First Year of Her present Majesty, (Note: Usury Act 1837 (7 Will. 4 & 1 Vict. c. 80)) for exempting certain Bills of Exchange and Promissory Notes from the Operation of the Laws relating to Usury. (Repealed by Statute Law Revision Act 1874 (No. 2) (37 & 38 Vict. c. 96))
| Metropolitan Police Courts Act 1840 (repealed) | 3 & 4 Vict. c. 84 | 7 August 1840 |
An Act for better defining the Powers of Justices within the Metropolitan Police District. (Repealed by Administration of Justice Act 1964 (c. 42), Theft Act 1968 (c. 60) and Tribunals, Courts and Enforcement Act 2007 (c. 15))
| Chimney Sweepers and Chimneys Regulation Act 1840 (repealed) | 3 & 4 Vict. c. 85 | 7 August 1840 |
An Act for the Regulation of Chimney Sweepers and Chimneys. (Repealed for England and Wales by Chimney Sweepers Acts (Repeal) Act 1938 (1 & 2 Geo. 6. c. 58) and for Scotland and Northern Ireland by Statute Law (Repeals) Act 1971 (c. 52))
| Church Discipline Act 1840 (repealed) | 3 & 4 Vict. c. 86 | 7 August 1840 |
An Act for better enforcing Church Discipline. (Repealed by Ecclesiastical Jurisdiction Measure 1963 (No. 1))
| Metropolitan Thoroughfares Act 1840 | 3 & 4 Vict. c. 87 | 7 August 1840 |
An Act to enable Her Majesty's Commissioners of Woods, Forests, Land Revenues, Works, and Buildings to make additional Thoroughfares in the Metropolis.
| County Police Act 1840 or the Police Act 1840 (repealed) | 3 & 4 Vict. c. 88 | 7 August 1840 |
An Act to Amend the Act (Note: County Police Act 1839 (2 & 3 Vict. c. 93)) for the Establishment of County and District Constables. (Repealed by Police Act 1964 (c. 48))
| Poor Rate Exemption Act 1840 (repealed) | 3 & 4 Vict. c. 89 | 10 August 1840 |
An Act to exempt until the Thirty-first Day of December One thousand eight hundred and forty-one, Inhabitants of Parishes, Townships, and Villages from Liability to be rated as such, in respect of Stock in Trade or other Property, to the Relief of the Poor. (Repealed by Local Government Act 1966 (c. 42))
| Infant Felons Act 1840 (repealed) | 3 & 4 Vict. c. 90 | 10 August 1840 |
An Act for the Care and Education of Infants who may be convicted of Felony. (Repealed by Statute Law Revision Act 1964 (c. 79))
| Textile Manufactures (Ireland) Act 1840 or the Textile Manufacturers (Ireland) Act 1840 (repealed) | 3 & 4 Vict. c. 91 | 10 August 1840 |
An Act for the more effectual Prevention of Frauds and Abuses committed by Weavers, Sewers, and other Persons employed in the Linen, Hempen, Union, Cotton, Silk, and Woollen Manufactures in Ireland, and for the better Payment of their Wages, for One Year, and from thence to the End of the then next Session of Parliament. (Repealed by Statute Law Revision Act (Northern Ireland) 1954 (c. 35 (N.I.)))
| Non-parochial Registers Act 1840 | 3 & 4 Vict. c. 92 | 10 August 1840 |
An Act for enabling Courts of Justice to admit Non-parochial Registers as evidence of Births or Baptisms, Deaths or Burials, and Marriages.
| Ecclesiastical Courts Act 1840 (repealed) | 3 & 4 Vict. c. 93 | 10 August 1840 |
Act to amend the Act for the better Regulation of Ecclesiastical Courts in England. (Repealed by Ecclesiastical Jurisdiction Measure 1963 (No. 1))
| Court of Chancery Act 1840 (repealed) | 3 & 4 Vict. c. 94 | 10 August 1840 |
An Act for facilitating the Administration of Justice in the Court of Chancery. (Repealed by Statute Law Revision Act 1874 (No. 2) (37 & 38 Vict. c. 96))
| Customs Act 1840 (repealed) | 3 & 4 Vict. c. 95 | 10 August 1840 |
An Act to enable Her Majesty to carry into effect certain Stipulations contained in a Treaty of Commerce and Navigation between Her Majesty and the Emperor of Austria; and to empower Her Majesty to declare, by Order in Council, that Ports which are the most natural and convenient Shipping Ports of States within whose Dominions they are not situated may in certain Cases be considered, for all Purposes of Trade with Her Majesty's Dominions, as the National Ports of such States. (Repealed by Statute Law Revision Act 1874 (No. 2) (37 & 38 Vict. c. 96))
| Post Office (Duties) Act 1840 (repealed) | 3 & 4 Vict. c. 96 | 10 August 1840 |
An Act for the Regulation of the Duties of Postage. (Repealed by Post Office Act 1908 (8 Edw. 7. c. 48))
| Railway Regulation Act 1840 | 3 & 4 Vict. c. 97 | 10 August 1840 |
An Act for regulating Railways.
| Highway Rates Act 1840 (repealed) | 3 & 4 Vict. c. 98 | 10 August 1840 |
An Act to authorize, for a limited Time, the Application of a Portion of the Highway Rates to Turnpike Roads in certain Townships and Districts. (Repealed by Statute Law Revision Act 1874 (No. 2) (37 & 38 Vict. c. 96))
| Census (Great Britain) Act 1840 (repealed) | 3 & 4 Vict. c. 99 | 10 August 1840 |
An Act for taking an Account of the Population of Great Britain. (Repealed by Statute Law Revision Act 1874 (No. 2) (37 & 38 Vict. c. 96))
| Census (Ireland) Act 1840 (repealed) | 3 & 4 Vict. c. 100 | 10 August 1840 |
An Act for taking an Account of the Population of Ireland. (Repealed by Statute Law Revision Act 1874 (No. 2) (37 & 38 Vict. c. 96))
| Church Temporalities (Ireland) Act 1840 or the Church Temporalities Act 1840 | 3 & 4 Vict. c. 101 | 10 August 1840 |
An Act to amend several Acts relating to the Temporalities of the Church in Ireland.
| Court Houses (Ireland) Act 1840 (repealed) | 3 & 4 Vict. c. 102 | 10 August 1840 |
An Act to amend the Law relating to Court Houses in Ireland. (Repealed by County Courts Act (Northern Ireland) 1959 (c. 25 (N.I.)))
| Dublin Justices Act 1840 (repealed) | 3 & 4 Vict. c. 103 | 10 August 1840 |
An Act to amend an Act of the last Session (Note: Dublin Police Act 1839 (2 & 3 Vict. c. 78)) for making further Provisions relating to the Police in the District of Dublin Metropolis. (Repealed by Statute Law (Repeals) Act 1993 (c. 50))
| Holyhead Road Act 1840 or the Holyhead Roads Act 1840 | 3 & 4 Vict. c. 104 | 10 August 1840 |
An Act to transfer to the Commissioners of Her Majesty's Woods and Works, and other Commissioners, the several Powers now vested in the Commissioners for repairing the Line of Road from Shrewsbury in the County of Salop to Bangor Ferry in the County of Carnarvon; and to amend the London and Holyhead Roads Acts so far as relates to the Dunstable Road.
| Debtors (Ireland) Act 1840 (repealed) | 3 & 4 Vict. c. 105 | 10 August 1840 |
An Act for abolishing Arrest on Mesne Process in Civil Actions, except in certain Cases; for extending the Remedies of Creditors against the Property of Debtors; and for the further Amendment of the Law and the better Advancement of Justice in Ireland. (Repealed by Judicature (Northern Ireland) Act 1978 (c. 23))
| Exchequer Bills Act 1840 (repealed) | 3 & 4 Vict. c. 106 | 10 August 1840 |
An Act for raising the Sum of Ten millions seven hundred fifty-one thousand five hundred and fifty Pounds by Exchequer Bills, for the Service of the Year One thousand eight hundred and forty. (Repealed by Statute Law Revision Act 1874 (No. 2) (37 & 38 Vict. c. 96))
| Insolvent Debtors (Ireland) Act 1840 (repealed) | 3 & 4 Vict. c. 107 | 10 August 1840 |
An Act to continue and amend the Laws for the Relief of Insolvent Debtors in Ireland. (Repealed by Irish Bankrupt and Insolvent Act 1857 (20 & 21 Vict. c. 60))
| Municipal Corporations (Ireland) Act 1840 (repealed) | 3 & 4 Vict. c. 108 | 10 August 1840 |
An Act for the Regulation of Municipal Corporations in Ireland. (Repealed by Local Government Act (Northern Ireland) 1972 (c. 9 (N.I.)))
| Counties and Boroughs (Ireland) Act 1840 | 3 & 4 Vict. c. 109 | 10 August 1840 |
An Act to annex certain Parts of certain Counties of Cities to adjoining Counties; to make further Provision for Compensation of Officers in Boroughs; to limit the Borough Rate; and to continue for a limited Time an Act (Note: Municipal Corporations (Ireland) Act 1836 (6 & 7 Will. 4. c. 100)) to restrain the Alienation of Corporate Property in Ireland.
| Loan Societies Act 1840 (repealed) | 3 & 4 Vict. c. 110 | 11 August 1840 |
An Act to amend the Laws relating to Loan Societies. (Repealed for the Channel Islands and the Isle of Man by Statute Law (Repeals) Act 1981 (c. 19) and for England and Wales by Statute Law (Repeals) Act 1998 (c. 43))
| Joint Stock Companies Act 1840 (repealed) | 3 & 4 Vict. c. 111 | 11 August 1840 |
An Act to continue until the Thirty-first Day of August One thousand eight hundred and forty-two, and to extend, the Provisions of an Act of the First and Second Years of Her present Majesty, (Note: Joint Stock Banks Act 1838 (1 & 2 Vict. c. 96)) relating to Legal Proceedings by certain Joint Stock Banking Companies against their own Members, and by such Members against the Companies. (Repealed by Statute Law Revision Act 1964 (c. 79))
| Appropriation Act 1840 (repealed) | 3 & 4 Vict. c. 112 | 11 August 1840 |
An Act to apply a Sum out of the Consolidated Fund to the Service of the Year One thousand eight hundred and forty, and to appropriate the Supplies granted in this Session of Parliament. (Repealed by Statute Law Revision Act 1874 (No. 2) (37 & 38 Vict. c. 96))
| Ecclesiastical Commissioners Act 1840 or the Cathedrals Act 1840 | 3 & 4 Vict. c. 113 | 11 August 1840 |
An Act to carry into effect, with certain modifications, the Fourth Report of the Commissioners of Ecclesiastical Duties and Revenues.

=== Local acts ===
| Short title | Citation | Royal assent |
Long title
| Chard Canal Company Act 1840 | 3 & 4 Vict. c. i | 23 March 1840 |
An Act to enable the Chard Canal Company to raise further Monies; and to amend the Act (Note: Chard Canal Act 1834 (4 & 5 Will. 4. c. liii)) relating to the same Canal.
| Chester and Birkenhead Railway Act 1840 (repealed) | 3 & 4 Vict. c. ii | 23 March 1840 |
An Act to amend the Act (Note: Chester and Birkenhead Railway Act 1837 (7 Will. 4 & 1 Vict. c. cvii)) relating to "The Chester and Birkenhead Railway," and to raise a further Sum of Money for the Purposes of the said Undertaking. (Repealed by Birkenhead, Lancashire and Cheshire Junction Railway Act 1852 (15 & 16 Vict. c. clxvii))
| Sheffield and Rotherham Railway Act 1840 (repealed) | 3 & 4 Vict. c. iii | 23 March 1840 |
An Act to enable the Sheffield and Rotherham Railway Company to raise a further Sum of Money; and to amend the Act (Note: Sheffield and Rotherham Railway Act 1836 (6 & 7 Will. 4. c. cix)) relating to the said Railway. (Repealed by Sheffield and Rotherham and Midland Railways Consolidation Act 1845 (8 & 9 Vict. c. xc))
| Lancaster and Preston Junction Railway Act 1840 | 3 & 4 Vict. c. iv | 23 March 1840 |
An Act to enable the Lancaster and Preston Junction Railway Company to raise a further Sum of Money; and to amend the Act (Note: Lancaster and Preston Junction Railway Act 1837 (7 Will. 4 & 1 Vict. c. xxii)) relating to such Railway.
| North Union Railway Company Act 1840 | 3 & 4 Vict. c. v | 23 March 1840 |
An Act to enable "The North Union Railway Company" to raise a further Sum of Money.
| Liverpool East India Warehouse Company Act 1840 | 3 & 4 Vict. c. vi | 23 March 1840 |
An Act to enable "The Liverpool East India Warehouse Company" to sue and be sued in the Name of the Chairman, Deputy Chairman, or any One of the Directors of the said Company; and for other Purposes relating thereto.
| Parish of St. Mary Rotherhithe Act 1840 | 3 & 4 Vict. c. vii | 23 March 1840 |
An Act to amend an Act passed in the First Year of the Reign of His late Majesty King George the Fourth, intituled "An Act for providing additional Burying Ground for the Parish of Saint Mary Rotherhithe in the County of Surrey;" (Note: St. Mary Rotherhithe Burial Ground Act 1820 (1 Geo. 4. c. xlii)) and for enabling the Rector of the said Parish to grant Building Leases of the Glebe Lands belonging to the said Rectory; and for other Purposes.
| Winchester Cemetery Act 1840 (repealed) | 3 & 4 Vict. c. viii | 23 March 1840 |
An Act for establishing a General Cemetery for the Interment of the Dead in the City and Borough of Winchester in the County of Southampton. (Repealed by Winchester Corporation Act 1952 (15 & 16 Geo. 6 & 1 Eliz. 2. c. xiv))
| Wolverhampton Chapel Act 1840 | 3 & 4 Vict. c. ix | 23 March 1840 |
An Act to amend and enlarge the Powers and Provisions of an Act passed in the Twenty-eighth Year of the Reign of His Majesty King George the Second, (Note: Wolverhampton Chapel Act 1755 (28 Geo. 2. c. 34)) for building a Chapel in the Town of Wolverhampton in the County of Stafford.
| Brighton and New Shoreham Small Debts Recovery Act 1840 (repealed) | 3 & 4 Vict. c. x | 23 March 1840 |
An Act for the more easy and speedy Recovery of Small Debts within the Towns and Boroughs of Brighton and New Shoreham, and other Places or Parishes adjacent or near thereto, in the County of Sussex. (Repealed by County Courts Act 1846 (9 & 10 Vict. c. 95))
| West Kennet and Amesbury Turnpike Road (Wiltshire) Act 1840 | 3 & 4 Vict. c. xi | 23 March 1840 |
An Act for making a Turnpike Road from West Kennet to Amesbury in the County of Wilts, with Branches therefrom.
| Edinburgh and Leith Gas Act 1840 (repealed) | 3 & 4 Vict. c. xii | 23 March 1840 |
An Act for the better lighting with Gas the City of Edinburgh and Town of Leith, and Places adjacent, and for other Purposes relating thereto. (Repealed by Edinburgh Corporation Order Confirmation Act 1932 (22 & 23 Geo. 5. c. vii))
| Edinburgh Gas Light Company Act 1840 (repealed) | 3 & 4 Vict. c. xiii | 23 March 1840 |
An Act for enabling the Edinburgh Gas Light Company more effectually to light with Gas the Town of Leith, the Vicinity thereof, and other Places in the County of Edinburgh; and for altering and enlarging the Powers of the said Company. (Repealed by Edinburgh Corporation Order Confirmation Act 1932 (22 & 23 Geo. 5. c. vii))
| Arbroath and Forfar Railway Act 1840 | 3 & 4 Vict. c. xiv | 3 April 1840 |
An Act to enable the Arbroath and Forfar Railway Company to raise a further Sum of Money, and otherwise to amend and enlarge the Powers and Provisions of the Act (Note: Arbroath and Forfar Railway Act 1836 (6 & 7 Will. 4. c. xxxiv)) relating to the Arbroath and Forfar Railway.
| Manchester and Salford Junction Canal Company Act 1840 | 3 & 4 Vict. c. xv | 3 April 1840 |
An Act to enable the Manchester and Salford Junction Canal Company to raise a further Sum of Money; and to alter, amend, and enlarge some of the Powers and Provisions of the Act (Note: Manchester and Salford Junction Canal Act 1836 (6 & 7 Will. 4. c. cxv)) relating to the said Canal.
| Cramond Bridge Act 1840 (repealed) | 3 & 4 Vict. c. xvi | 3 April 1840 |
An Act to continue and amend an Act (Note: Cramond Bridge Act 1821 (1 & 2 Geo. 4. c. cxx)) for erecting a Bridge over the River Almond, which divides the Counties of Edinburgh and Linlithgow. (Repealed by Roads and Bridges (Scotland) Act 1878 (41 & 42 Vict. c. 51))
| Edinburgh Customs and Duties Act 1840 (repealed) | 3 & 4 Vict. c. xvii | 3 April 1840 |
An Act for abolishing certain Petty and Market Customs in the City of Edinburgh, and granting other Duties in lieu thereof. (Repealed by Edinburgh Corporation Order Confirmation Act 1962 (11 & 12 Eliz. 2. c. ii))
| Bolton Small Debts Recovery Act 1840 (repealed) | 3 & 4 Vict. c. xviii | 3 April 1840 |
An Act for the more easy and speedy Recovery of Small Debts within the Town of Bolton and other Places in the County of Lancaster. (Repealed by County Courts Act 1846 (9 & 10 Vict. c. 95))
| Thames Plate Glass Company Act 1840 | 3 & 4 Vict. c. xix | 3 April 1840 |
An Act to enable "The Thames Plate Glass Company" to sue and be sued in the Name of the Chairman or Deputy Chairman, or Secretary, or any One of the Directors for the Time being of the said Company; and for other Purposes.
| Protestant Dissenters and General Life and Fire Insurance Company Act 1840 | 3 & 4 Vict. c. xx | 3 April 1840 |
An Act to enable the Protestant Dissenters and General Life and Fire Insurance Company to sue and be sued in the Name of the Chairman, Deputy Chairman, or any One of the Directors, or of the Secretary of the said Company.
| Warminster Roads Act 1840 (repealed) | 3 & 4 Vict. c. xxi | 3 April 1840 |
An Act for making and repairing several Roads in and leading to and from the Town of Warminster in the County of Wilts. (Repealed by Annual Turnpike Acts Continuance Act 1869 (32 & 33 Vict. c. 90))
| Weston-super-Mare and Worle Road Act 1840 | 3 & 4 Vict. c. xxii | 3 April 1840 |
An Act for making and maintaining a new Road from the Road at Worle to a Road in the Parish of Kewstoke leading to Locking and Weston-super-Mare in the County of Somerset.
| General Steam Navigation Company Act 1840 (repealed) | 3 & 4 Vict. c. xxiii | 14 April 1840 |
An Act to amend and explain some of the Provisions of the Acts relating to the General Steam Navigation Company. (Repealed by General Steam Navigation Company Act 1874 (37 & 38 Vict. c. viii))
| Wyrley and Essington Canal Navigation Act 1840 | 3 & 4 Vict. c. xxiv | 14 April 1840 |
An Act for consolidating the Wyrley and Essington Canal Navigation with the Birmingham Canal Navigations, and for granting further Powers to the Company of Proprietors of the Birmingham Canal Navigations.
| Newton Abbot Small Debts Recovery Act 1840 (repealed) | 3 & 4 Vict. c. xxv | 14 April 1840 |
An Act for the more easy and speedy Recovery of Small Debts within the Township of Newton Abbot, and other Townships, Parishes, and Places, all in the County of Devon. (Repealed by County Courts Act 1846 (9 & 10 Vict. c. 95))
| Crown Point Bridge (Leeds) Act 1840 | 3 & 4 Vict. c. xxvi | 14 April 1840 |
An Act for making and maintaining a new Bridge over the River Aire at Leeds, at or near a Place called Crown Point, with suitable Approaches thereto; and for making certain Drains or Watercourses under the Roads leading to such Bridge, and through the adjoining Lands, to communicate with the River Aire below the Leeds Locks.
| Greenock Improvement Act 1840 (repealed) | 3 & 4 Vict. c. xxvii | 14 April 1840 |
An Act for the further Improvement of the Town of Greenock; for better lighting and supplying the same with Water; for regulating the Police thereof; and for other Purposes connected therewith. (Repealed by Greenock Police Act 1877 (40 & 41 Vict. c. cxciii))
| Calton and Mile End Police Act 1840 | 3 & 4 Vict. c. xxviii | 14 April 1840 |
An Act to continue the Term and amend and alter the Powers of an Act for regulating the Police of the Burgh of Calton and Village and Lands of Mile End in the County of Lanark.
| Lanark and Glasgow Bridewell Act 1840 | 3 & 4 Vict. c. xxix | 14 April 1840 |
An Act to continue enlarge and explain several Acts for erecting a Bridewell for the County of Lanark and City of Glasgow.
| Marquis of Tweeddale's Patents Act 1840 | 3 & 4 Vict. c. xxx | 14 April 1840 |
An Act to authorize the Transfer to more than Twelve Persons of certain Patents granted to the Marquis of Tweeddale (Note: George Hay, 8th Marquess of Tweeddale.) relating to the Manufacture of Drain-tiles, Bricks, and other Articles, and for the Establishment of a Company for carrying out the Objects of the said Patents.
| Andover and Basingstoke Road Act 1840 | 3 & 4 Vict. c. xxxi | 14 April 1840 |
An Act for more effectually repairing the road from Basingstoke in the county of Southampton to Lobcomb Corner in the county of Wilts, and other roads therein described; and for making a new road from the said road at the eastern entrance of the town of Andover to the Warren Farm Station on the London and South-western Railway, in the said county of Southampton.
| Macclesfield to Congleton Road Act 1840 | 3 & 4 Vict. c. xxxii | 14 April 1840 |
An Act for repairing and improving the road from Macclesfield to Congleton in the county of Chester.
| Barkston-Ash and Skyrack Court of Requests (Yorks.) Act 1840 (repealed) | 3 & 4 Vict. c. xxxiii | 19 May 1840 |
An Act for extending the Jurisdiction of the Barkston Ash and Skyrack Court of Requests, and the Powers and Provisions of the Act (Note: Aberford Small Debts Recovery Act 1839 (2 & 3 Vict. c. lxxxvi)) passed constituting such Court, to certain Places in the West and East Ridings of the County of York, and amending the same Act. (Repealed by County Courts Act 1846 (9 & 10 Vict. c. 95))
| Winterslow and New Sarum Roads Act 1840 (repealed) | 3 & 4 Vict. c. xxxiv | 19 May 1840 |
An Act for repairing and improving the Roads from Lobcombe Corner in the Parish of Winterslow to the City of New Sarum in the County of Wilts, and from the said City to Landford and other Roads in the County of Southampton. (Repealed by Annual Turnpike Acts Continuance Act 1869 (32 & 33 Vict. c. 90))
| Torquay Roads Act 1840 | 3 & 4 Vict. c. xxxv | 19 May 1840 |
An Act for more effectually repairing and improving certain Roads near Torquay, Paignton, Brixham, Kingswear, Newton Abbot, and Shaldon, and for making certain new Roads connected therewith, all in the County of Devon.
| Taunton Roads Act 1840 | 3 & 4 Vict. c. xxxvi | 19 May 1840 |
An Act for more effectually repairing several Roads leading from the Town of Taunton in the County of Somerset, and for making several Deviations and new Lines of Road connected therewith.
| Upottery and Ilminster Roads Act 1840 | 3 & 4 Vict. c. xxxvii | 19 May 1840 |
An Act for more effectually repairing the Road from the Honiton Turnpike Road near Yard Farm in the Parish of Upottery in the County of Devon, towards Ilminster, to the Eastern Boundary of the Parish of Buckland Saint Mary in the County of Somerset; and for making, maintaining, and repairing several other Roads communicating therewith in the Counties of Devon, Somerset, and Dorset.
| Banbury and Lutterworth Road Act 1840 (repealed) | 3 & 4 Vict. c. xxxviii | 19 May 1840 |
An Act for repairing and maintaining a Road from Banbury in the County of Oxford to Lutterworth in the County of Leicester, and other Roads communicating therewith. (Repealed by Annual Turnpike Acts Continuance Act 1870 (33 & 34 Vict. c. 73))
| Stirling and Queensferry Road Act 1840 | 3 & 4 Vict. c. xxxix | 19 May 1840 |
An Act for maintaining and repairing the Road from Causeway Head near Stirling, through the County of Clackmannan, by the Foot of the Ochil Hills, towards Queensferry, and certain Roads branching out of the same.
| Clackmannan and Perth Roads Act 1840 | 3 & 4 Vict. c. xl | 19 May 1840 |
An Act to alter and amend several Acts, for making, maintaining, and keeping in repair certain Roads in the Counties of Clackmannan and Perth; and for other Purposes relating thereto.
| Scottish Widows' Fund and Life Assurance Society Act 1840 (repealed) | 3 & 4 Vict. c. xli | 19 May 1840 |
An Act to enable the Scottish Widows Fund and Life Assurance Society to sue and be sued; and for other Purposes relating to the said Society. (Repealed by Scottish Widows' Fund and Life Assurance Society's Incorporation Act 1861 (24 & 25 Vict. c. lxxxv))
| Dewsbury Gas Act 1840 (repealed) | 3 & 4 Vict. c. xlii | 19 May 1840 |
An Act for better lighting and supplying with Gas the Town and Neighbourhood of Dewsbury in the West Riding of the County of York. (Repealed by Dewsbury and Batley Gas Act 1851 (14 & 15 Vict. c. iv))
| Taunton Improvement and Markets Act 1840 (repealed) | 3 & 4 Vict. c. xliii | 19 May 1840 |
An Act for amending the Powers and Provisions of several Acts relating to the holding of Markets in the Town of Taunton in the County of Somerset, and to the Improvement of the said Town. (Repealed by Taunton Corporation Act 1931 (21 & 22 Geo. 5. c. cii))
| Workington Harbour Act 1840 (repealed) | 3 & 4 Vict. c. xliv | 19 May 1840 |
An Act for regulating and preserving the Harbour of Workington in the County of Cumberland, and for other Purposes relating thereto. (Repealed by Workington Harbour and Dock (Transfer) Act 1957 (5 & 6 Eliz. 2. c. xxxii))
| Workington Improvement Act 1840 | 3 & 4 Vict. c. xlv | 19 May 1840 |
An Act for paving, cleansing, watching, and otherwise improving the Town of Workington in the County of Cumberland.
| South Eastern Railway Diversion Act 1840 | 3 & 4 Vict. c. xlvi | 19 May 1840 |
An Act to alter and divert a Portion of the Line of the South-eastern Railway in the County of Kent.
| Bristol and Exeter Railway Act 1840 | 3 & 4 Vict. c. xlvii | 19 May 1840 |
An Act to amend and enlarge the Powers and Provisions of the Acts relating to the Bristol and Exeter Railway.
| Newcastle-upon-Tyne and North Shields Railway Act 1840 | 3 & 4 Vict. c. xlviii | 19 May 1840 |
An Act to amend the Act relating to the Newcastle-upon-Tyne and North Shields Railway, and to raise a further Sum of Money for the Purposes of the said Undertaking.
| Chester and Crewe Railway Act 1840 (repealed) | 3 & 4 Vict. c. xlix | 19 May 1840 |
An Act for incorporating the Chester and Crewe Railway with the Grand Junction Railway, and for extending to the said first-mentioned Railway the Provisions of the several Acts of Parliament relating to the said last-mentioned Railway; and for other Purposes. (Repealed by London and North Western Railway Act 1846 (9 & 10 Vict. c. cciv))
| Thames Tunnel Company Act 1840 (repealed) | 3 & 4 Vict. c. l | 4 June 1840 |
An Act to revive the Powers given to the Thames Tunnel Company for the Purchase of certain Houses, Lands, and Premises in the Parish of Saint John of Wapping. (Repealed by Thames Tunnel Act 1866 (29 & 30 Vict. c. xx))
| Birmingham and Derby Junction Railway Act 1840 (repealed) | 3 & 4 Vict. c. li | 4 June 1840 |
An Act to make a further Alteration in the Line of the Birmingham and Derby Junction Railway, and an Approach thereto at Tamworth, and to amend the Acts relating to the said Railway. (Repealed by Midland Railway Consolidation Act 1844 (7 & 8 Vict. c. xviii))
| Northern and Eastern Railway Act 1840 | 3 & 4 Vict. c. lii | 4 June 1840 |
An Act to enable the Northern and Eastern Railway Company to abandon a Portion of the Line originally authorized to be made; and to alter and amend several of the Powers and Provisions of the Acts relating to the said Railway.
| Glasgow, Paisley, Kilmarnock and Ayr Railway (High Monkcurr Branch) Act 1840 | 3 & 4 Vict. c. liii | 4 June 1840 |
An Act to amend and continue the Act relating to the Glasgow, Paisley, Kilmarnock, and Ayr Railway, and to make a new Branch therefrom.
| Portsmouth Harbour Floating Bridge Act 1840 | 3 & 4 Vict. c. liv | 4 June 1840 |
An Act for amending and enlarging the Powers of an Act (Note: Portsmouth Floating Bridge Act 1838 (1 & 2 Vict. c. xi)) for establishing a Floating Bridge or Bridges over the Harbour of Portsmouth in the County of Southampton.
| Dartford and Crayford Creeks Act 1840 | 3 & 4 Vict. c. lv | 4 June 1840 |
An Act for improving the Dartford and Crayford Creeks in the County of Kent, and for making a Diversion in the Line of the said Dartford Creek, and other Works connected therewith.
| Birmingham Canal Navigations Act 1840 | 3 & 4 Vict. c. lvi | 4 June 1840 |
An Act to authorize the Company of Proprietors of the Birmingham Canal Navigations to extend and alter the Line of their intended Cut or Canal from Dank's Branch to Salford Bridge; and to grant further Powers to the said Company.
| Birmingham and Warwick Junction Canal Navigation Act 1840 | 3 & 4 Vict. c. lvii | 4 June 1840 |
An Act for making and maintaining a navigable Cut or Canal connecting the Warwick and Birmingham Canal with the Birmingham Canal, commencing by a Junction with the Warwick and Birmingham Canal, in the Hamlet of Bordesley in the Parish of Aston-juxta-Birmingham in the County of Warwick, and terminating by a Junction with the Birmingham Canal, near Salford Bridge, in the same Parish.
| Exeter Water Act 1840 | 3 & 4 Vict. c. lviii | 4 June 1840 |
An Act to amend the Acts for supplying with Water the City and County of the City of Exeter and Places adjacent thereto.
| Faversham Oyster Fishery Company Act 1840 (repealed) | 3 & 4 Vict. c. lix | 4 June 1840 |
An Act for granting certain Powers to the Faversham Oyster Fishery Company. (Repealed by Faversham Oyster Fishery Act 1930 (20 & 21 Geo. 5. c. lxxiv))
| Gravesend and Milton Improvement Act 1840 (repealed) | 3 & 4 Vict. c. lx | 4 June 1840 |
An Act to amend, alter, and enlarge the Powers and Provisions of an Act of His late Majesty, (Note: Gravesend and Milton Improvement Act 1833 (3 & 4 Will. 4. c. li)) for paving, cleansing, lighting, watching, and improving the Town and Parishes of Gravesend and Milton in the County of Kent, and for removing and preventing Nuisances and Annoyances therein; and to make further Improvements in the said Town and Parishes. (Repealed by Gravesend Improvement Act 1856 (19 & 20 Vict. c. xxvi))
| York Streets Improvement Act 1840 (repealed) | 3 & 4 Vict. c. lxi | 4 June 1840 |
An Act to enable the Mayor, Aldermen, and Citizens of the City of York to widen, alter, and improve certain Streets or Thoroughfares called Spurriergate and Coney Street, in the said City. (Repealed by York Corporation Act 1969 (c. xxxviii))
| River Wear Watch Act 1840 (repealed) | 3 & 4 Vict. c. lxii | 4 June 1840 |
An Act for establishing and maintaining a proper and effective Watch on the River Wear in the Port or Haven of Sunderland near the Sea in the County of Durham. (Repealed by River Wear Watch (Dissolution) Act 1961 (9 & 10 Eliz. 2. c. xxxi))
| Tunstall Markets Act 1840 (repealed) | 3 & 4 Vict. c. lxiii | 4 June 1840 |
An Act for regulating and maintaining the Markets and Market Place in the Township of Tunstall in the Parish of Wolstanton in the County of Stafford. (Repealed by Local Government Board's Provisional Order Confirmation (No. 3) Act 1908 (8 Edw. 7. c. clxiv))
| Greenhill Moor and Eckington Turnpike (Derbyshire) Act 1840 | 3 & 4 Vict. c. lxiv | 4 June 1840 |
An Act for making a Turnpike Road from Greenhill Moor to Eckington in the County of Derby.
| Maiden Newton Roads Act 1840 | 3 & 4 Vict. c. lxv | 4 June 1840 |
An Act for making and maintaining several Roads leading from the Town of Maiden Newton in the County of Dorset, and other Roads communicating therewith, in the Counties of Somerset and Dorset.
| Roxburgh Turnpike Roads Act 1840 | 3 & 4 Vict. c. lxvi | 4 June 1840 |
An Act for further and more effectually repairing and maintaining several Turnpike Roads in the County of Roxburgh.
| Elgin Turnpike Roads Act 1840 | 3 & 4 Vict. c. lxvii | 4 June 1840 |
An Act for further and more effectually repairing and maintaining certain Turnpike Roads in the County of Elgin.
| Tavistock Small Debts Recovery Act 1840 (repealed) | 3 & 4 Vict. c. lxviii | 19 June 1840 |
An Act for the more easy and speedy Recovery of Small Debts within the Town of Tavistock and other Places in the Counties of Devon and Cornwall. (Repealed by County Courts Act 1846 (9 & 10 Vict. c. 95))
| Kingsnorton and Northfield Small Debts Recovery Act 1840 (repealed) | 3 & 4 Vict. c. lxix | 19 June 1840 |
An Act for the more easy Recovery of Small Debts within the Parishes of Kingsnorton and Northfield in the County of Worcester. (Repealed by Statute Law (Repeals) Act 2013 (c. 2))
| Duffryn Llynvi and Porth Cawl Railway Act 1840 (repealed) | 3 & 4 Vict. c. lxx | 19 June 1840 |
An Act to enable the Duffryn Llynvi and Porth Cawl Railway Company to raise a further Sum of Money, and to amend the Acts relating to the said Railway and to the Bay of Porth Cawl in the County of Glamorgan. (Repealed by Llynvi Valley Railway Act 1855 (18 & 19 Vict. c. l))
| Port Talbot Company Act 1840 | 3 & 4 Vict. c. lxxi | 19 June 1840 |
An Act to enable the Port Talbot Company to raise further Monies, and to amend the Acts relating to the same Port.
| Penzance Pier and Harbour Act 1840 (repealed) | 3 & 4 Vict. c. lxxii | 19 June 1840 |
An Act to amend an Act of the Fifty-seventh Year of King George the Third, intituled "An Act for fixing the Dues, Duties, and Payments for all Goods, Wares, and Merchandize landed on or shipped from the Pier or Quay of the Town of Penzance in the County of Cornwall, and on all Ships and Vessels resorting to the said Pier or Quay, or to the Harbour of Penzance;" (Note: Penzance Pier and Harbour Dues Act 1817 (57 Geo. 3. c. xxxi)) and for making and maintaining an additional Pier and Dock within the said Harbour. (Repealed by Penzance Corporation Act 1883 (46 & 47 Vict. c. lxxiv))
| Fisherrow Harbour (Edinburgh) Act 1840 | 3 & 4 Vict. c. lxxiii | 19 June 1840 |
An Act for improving enlarging and maintaining the Harbour of Fisherrow in the County of Edinburgh.
| Exeter Customs and Dues Act 1840 | 3 & 4 Vict. c. lxxiv | 19 June 1840 |
An Act for equalizing, defining, and regulating the Petty Customs, and for facilitating the Collection thereof and of the Quay Dues payable to the Mayor, Aldermen, and Burgesses of the City and Borough of Exeter, and for preserving the Navigation of the River Exe.
| Launceston Markets Act 1840 (repealed) | 3 & 4 Vict. c. lxxv | 19 June 1840 |
An Act for regulating the Markets and for erecting a Market House in the Town of Launceston in the County of Cornwall. (Repealed by Ministry of Health Provisional Orders Confirmation (No. 7) Act 1920 (10 & 11 Geo. 5. c. cxiv))
| Kingston-upon-Hull Lighting and Cleansing Act 1840 (repealed) | 3 & 4 Vict. c. lxxvi | 19 June 1840 |
An Act for better lighting and cleansing the Town of Kingston-upon-Hull, and certain Parts of the Liberty of Trippett within and Part of the Municipal Borough of Kingston-upon-Hull. (Repealed by Kingston-upon-Hull Improvement Act 1854 (17 & 18 Vict. c. ci))
| Bristol Improvement Act 1840 or the Bristol Building Act 1840 | 3 & 4 Vict. c. lxxvii | 19 June 1840 |
An Act for regulating Buildings and Party Walls within the City of Bristol and the widening and Improvement of Streets within the same.
| Newcastle-upon-Tyne and Gateshead Water Act 1840 | 3 & 4 Vict. c. lxxviii | 19 June 1840 |
An Act for better supplying with Water the Town and County of the Town of Newcastle-upon-Tyne and Borough of Gateshead, and the Places adjacent thereto, in the Counties of Northumberland and Durham.
| Belfast Water Act 1840 | 3 & 4 Vict. c. lxxix | 19 June 1840 |
An Act for better supplying with Water the Town and Borough of Belfast.
| Tadcaster and Halton Dial Road Act 1840 | 3 & 4 Vict. c. lxxx | 19 June 1840 |
An Act for repairing and maintaining the Road from Tadcaster to Halton Dial, and for making and maintaining a new Road from Seacroft to and into the Highway leading from Scholes to Barwick-in-Elmet, all in the West Riding of the County of York.
| Roads to and from Exeter Act 1840 (repealed) | 3 & 4 Vict. c. lxxxi | 19 June 1840 |
An Act to amend the Provisions of the Acts relating to the Turnpike Roads leading to and from the City of Exeter, and for making a new Branch Road to communicate therewith. (Repealed by Exeter Turnpike Roads Act 1852 (15 & 16 Vict. c. cliv))
| Nairn and Inverness Turnpike Roads Act 1840 | 3 & 4 Vict. c. lxxxii | 19 June 1840 |
An Act for more effectually making, repairing, and maintaining certain Turnpike Roads in the Counties of Nairn and Inverness.
| Rocester (Derbyshire) Bridge Roads Act 1840 | 3 & 4 Vict. c. lxxxiii | 19 June 1840 |
An Act for making certain Roads and Branches connected with the new Bridge now erecting over the River Dove near the Village of Rocester Turnpike, with proper Deviations, Works, and Conveniences, and new Pieces of Road connected therewith, and Approaches thereto, in the Counties of Derby and Stafford.
| Maidstone and Newcastle (Kent) Road Act 1840 | 3 & 4 Vict. c. lxxxiv | 19 June 1840 |
An Act for repairing the Road from the Maidstone Turnpike Gate on the Loose Road in the Parish of Maidstone in the County of Kent to Newcastle in the Parish of Biddenden, and a Branch Road to the Thorn in the Parish of Smarden in the same County.
| Holy Cross and St. Giles Cemetery (Shrewsbury) Act 1840 | 3 & 4 Vict. c. lxxxv | 19 June 1840 |
An Act for establishing a general Cemetery in the Parish of Holy Cross and Saint Giles in or near the Town of Shrewsbury in the County of Salop.
| Royal Naval School Act 1840 | 3 & 4 Vict. c. lxxxvi | 19 June 1840 |
An Act for the Establishment and Government of the Institution called "The Royal Naval School". (Repealed by Statute Law (Repeals) Act 2008 (c. 12))
| Chester Coroners Act 1840 (repealed) | 3 & 4 Vict. c. lxxxvii | 19 June 1840 |
An Act to authorize the Appointment of additional Coroners for the County Palatine of Chester. (Repealed by Cheshire County Council Act 1980 (c. xiii))
| Belfast Charitable Society Act 1840 | 3 & 4 Vict. c. lxxxviii | 19 June 1840 |
An Act to amend the several Acts relating to the Belfast Charitable Society.
| Liverpool Borough Council Bonds Act 1840 (repealed) | 3 & 4 Vict. c. lxxxix | 19 June 1840 |
An Act to enable the Council of the Borough of Liverpool to raise Money upon Bonds. (Repealed by Liverpool Corporation Act 1921 (11 & 12 Geo. 5. c. lxxiv))
| Lincolnshire Drainage Act 1840 | 3 & 4 Vict. c. xc | 19 June 1840 |
An Act for the more effectual Drainage of certain Lands called Billinghay Fen, Billinghay Dales, and Walcot Fen, Walcot Dales, and North Kyme East Fen and Ings, in the Parishes or Places of Billinghay, Walcot, Dogdike, Hart's Grounds, Coningsby, Swineshead, North Kyme, and South Kyme, in the County of Lincoln.
| Strood (Kent) Workhouse and Improvement Act 1840 (repealed) | 3 & 4 Vict. c. xci | 3 July 1840 |
An Act to amend an Act (Note: Strood Workhouse, Poor and Church Act 1812 (52 Geo. 3. c. xxxvii)) for enlarging the present or providing a new Workhouse for the use of the Parish of Strood, in the County of Kent, for better governing, maintaining and employing the Poor of the said Parish, and also for repairing or rebuilding the Church and Tower of the same Parish, and for other Purposes relating thereto. (Repealed by County of Kent Act 1981 (c. xviii))
| Ayr Water Act 1840 (repealed) | 3 & 4 Vict. c. xcii | 3 July 1840 |
An Act for supplying the Town of Ayr and Suburbs of Newton and Wallacetown, and Places adjacent, in the County of Ayr, with Water. (Repealed by Ayr Water Company's Act 1865 (28 & 29 Vict. c. cxii))
| Glasgow Poor Act 1840 (repealed) | 3 & 4 Vict. c. xciii | 3 July 1840 |
An Act for explaining, altering and amending the mode of Assessment for the Maintenance of the Poor within the City of Glasgow. (Repealed by Statute Law (Repeals) Act 1998 (c. 43))
| Marine Insurance Company Act 1840 | 3 & 4 Vict. c. xciv | 3 July 1840 |
An Act for enabling the Marine Insurance Company to sue and be sued in the name of the Chairman or Deputy Chairman, for the time being, of the said Company.
| Farmers' and General Fire and Life Assurance and Loan and Annuity Company Act 1840 | 3 & 4 Vict. c. xcv | 3 July 1840 |
An Act to enable "The Farmers' and General Fire and Life Insurance and Loan and Annuity Company" to sue and be sued in the name of the Manager, Chairman or any one of the Directors or the Secretary of the said Company.
| British Iron Company Act 1840 | 3 & 4 Vict. c. xcvi | 3 July 1840 |
An Act for granting certain Powers to the British Iron Company.
| Edinburgh Silk Yarn Company Act 1840 | 3 & 4 Vict. c. xcvii | 3 July 1840 |
An Act for establishing and regulating a Company to be called "The Edinburgh Silk Yarn Company," and to enable the said Company to purchase certain Letters Patent.
| Kollmann's Railway Locomotive and Carriage Improvement Company Act 1840 | 3 & 4 Vict. c. xcviii | 3 July 1840 |
An Act for forming a Company to be called "Kollmann's Railway Locomotive and Carriage Improvement Company," and for enabling the said Company to purchase certain Letters Patent.
| Crichton Royal Institution for Lunatics at Dumfries Act 1840 | 3 & 4 Vict. c. xcix | 3 July 1840 |
An Act to incorporate the Trustees and others, Directors of the Crichton Royal Institution for Lunatics at Dumfries, and for the better enabling them to carry on their Charitable Designs.
| Bedford and Woburn Road Act 1840 | 3 & 4 Vict. c. c | 3 July 1840 |
An Act for repairing, improving, and maintaining the Road from Bedford to Woburn with a Branch therefrom, all in the County of Bedford.
| Stirling, Dumbarton, Lanark and Perth Roads Act 1840 (repealed) | 3 & 4 Vict. c. ci | 3 July 1840 |
An Act to make, alter, improve, and maintain certain Roads in the Counties of Stirling, Dumbarton, Lanark, and Perth. (Repealed by Roads (Scotland) Act 1984 (c. 54))
| Turnpike Roads in Stewartry of Kirkcudbright Act 1840 (repealed) | 3 & 4 Vict. c. cii | 3 July 1840 |
An Act for making and maintaining certain Turnpike Roads in the Stewartry of Kirkcudbright, and the other Highways, Bridges, and Ferries therein, and for more effectually converting into Money the Statute Labour in the said Stewartry. (Repealed by Roads (Scotland) Act 1984 (c. 54))
| Road from Edinburgh to Lanark Act 1840 (repealed) | 3 & 4 Vict. c. ciii | 3 July 1840 |
An Act to alter and amend certain Acts for making and maintaining a Road from the Limits of the Counties of Edinburgh and Lanark by Wilsontown into the Burgh of Lanark, with a Branch towards Ravenstruther in the said County of Lanark; and for other Purposes relating thereto. (Repealed by Roads (Scotland) Act 1984 (c. 54))
| Ardrossan and Johnston Railway Act 1840 | 3 & 4 Vict. c. civ | 23 July 1840 |
An Act for separating the Management of the Ardrossan and Johnston Railway from the Management of the Glasgow, Paisley, and Johnston Canal; for incorporating the Proprietors thereof; for doubling and improving the said Railway; and for other Purposes relating thereto.
| Birmingham, Bristol and Thames Junction Railway Act 1840 | 3 & 4 Vict. c. cv | 23 July 1840 |
An Act to amend and enlarge some of the Provisions of the Act (Note: Birmingham, Bristol and Thames Junction Railway Act 1836 (6 & 7 Will. 4. c. lxxix)) relating to the Birmingham, Bristol, and Thames Junction Railway; and to authorize the Company to raise a further Sum of Money for the Purposes of the said Undertaking.
| Dublin and Drogheda Railway Act 1840 | 3 & 4 Vict. c. cvi | 23 July 1840 |
An Act to alter and amend the Acts passed for making a Railway from Dublin to Drogheda.
| Glasgow, Paisley and Greenock Railway Act 1840 | 3 & 4 Vict. c. cvii | 23 July 1840 |
An Act to amend and enlarge the Powers and Provisions of the Act (Note: Glasgow, Paisley and Greenock Railway Act 1837 (7 Will. 4 & 1 Vict. c. cxvi)) relating to the Glasgow, Paisley, and Greenock Railway, and to make certain new Branch Railways from the Main Line in the Towns of Greenock and Port Glasgow, and to make other Works in connexion with the said Railway.
| Edinburgh and Glasgow Railway Act 1840 (repealed) | 3 & 4 Vict. c. cviii | 23 July 1840 |
An Act to amend the Act (Note: Edinburgh and Glasgow Railway Act 1838 (1 & 2 Vict. c. lviii)) relating to the Edinburgh and Glasgow Railway. (Repealed by Edinburgh and Glasgow Railway Consolidation Act 1852 (15 & 16 Vict. c. cix))
| Hartlepool Dock and Railway Act 1840 | 3 & 4 Vict. c. cix | 23 July 1840 |
An Act to enable the Hartlepool Dock and Railway Company to raise a further Sum of Money, for completing their Undertaking; and enlarging the Time for completing the same; and for amending the Acts relating thereto.
| Taff Vale Railway Act 1840 | 3 & 4 Vict. c. cx | 23 July 1840 |
An Act to amend the Acts relating to the Taff Vale Railway.
| Mill Bay Pier Act 1840 | 3 & 4 Vict. c. cxi | 23 July 1840 |
An Act for erecting and maintaining a Pier and other Works in Mill Bay in the Port of Plymouth in the County of Devon.
| Clerkenwell Green Street Act 1840 | 3 & 4 Vict. c. cxii | 23 July 1840 |
An Act for opening a Street to Clerkenwell Green in the County of Middlesex, in continuation of the new Street from Farringdon Street in the City of London.
| Deal Water Act 1840 | 3 & 4 Vict. c. cxiii | 23 July 1840 |
An Act for better supplying with Water the Town and Borough of Deal, and the Neighbourhood thereof in the County of Kent.
| Banff Government and Harbour Act 1840 (repealed) | 3 & 4 Vict. c. cxiv | 23 July 1840 |
An Act for regulating the Municipal Government and Expences of the Royal Burgh of Banff, North Britain; for establishing an effective Police within the same; and also for maintaining, improving, and regulating the Harbour of the said Royal Burgh. (Repealed by Grampian Regional Council (Harbours) Order Confirmation Act 1987 (c. x))
| General Salvage Company Act 1840 | 3 & 4 Vict. c. cxv | 23 July 1840 |
An Act for forming and establishing a Company to be called "The General Salvage Company," and for enabling the said Company to purchase certain Letters Patent.
| Newcastle-under-Lyme Roads Act 1840 | 3 & 4 Vict. c. cxvi | 23 July 1840 |
An Act for improving the Roads leading from Newcastle-under-Lyme to Blyth Marsh, from Cliff Bank to Shelton, from Fenton to Hem Heath, and from Shelton to Newcastle-under-Lyme; and for making and completing certain new Pieces of Road to communicate therewith; all in the County of Stafford.
| Garngad Road Act 1840 | 3 & 4 Vict. c. cxvii | 23 July 1840 |
An Act to alter and amend an Act passed in the Third Year of the Reign of His Majesty King George the Fourth, (Note: Inchbelly Bridge and Glasgow Road Act 1822 (3 Geo. 4. c. xvii)) and the Acts therein recited, so far as the same relate to the Road to Provan Mill commonly called the Garngad Road; and for other Purposes relating thereto.
| Clyde Navigation Act 1840 (repealed) | 3 & 4 Vict. c. cxviii | 4 August 1840 |
An Act for further deepening and improving the River Clyde, and enlarging the Harbour of Glasgow, and for constructing a Wet Dock in connexion with the said River and Harbour. (Repealed by Clyde Navigation Consolidation Act 1858 (21 & 22 Vict. c. cxlix))
| Dundalk River, Port and Harbour Act 1840 (repealed) | 3 & 4 Vict. c. cxix | 4 August 1840 |
An Act for regulating preserving, improving and maintaining the River, Port and Harbour of Dundalk, in the County of Louth, in Ireland. (Repealed by Dundalk Harbour and Port Act 1855 (18 & 19 Vict. c. clxxxix))
| Herculaneum Docks Act 1840 | 3 & 4 Vict. c. cxx | 4 August 1840 |
An Act for regulating certain intended Docks at Liverpool to be called the Herculaneum Docks, and exempting Vessels frequenting the same, and their Cargoes, from a Portion of the Tolls and Duties payable to the Trustees of the Liverpool Docks.
| Harrington Dock Company Act 1840 | 3 & 4 Vict. c. cxxi | 4 August 1840 |
An Act for regulating certain intended Docks at Liverpool, to be called the Herculaneum Docks, and exempting Vessels frequenting the same, and their Cargoes, from a portion of the Tolls and Duties payable to the Trustees of the Liverpool Docks.
| Exeter Markets Act 1840 (repealed) | 3 & 4 Vict. c. cxxii | 4 August 1840 |
An Act to alter, amend and enlarge the Powers and Provisions of an Act (Note: Exeter Markets Act 1834 (4 & 5 Will. 4. c. viii)) for removing the Markets held in the High and Fore-street, and other Places within the City of Exeter, and for providing other Markets in lieu thereof. (Repealed by Exeter City Council Act 1987 (c. xi))
| Erskine and Dumbarton Ferry Act 1840 | 3 & 4 Vict. c. cxxiii | 4 August 1840 |
An Act for establishing an improved Ferry between the western part of the Parish of Erskine, in the County of Renfrew, and Dumbarton in the County of Dumbarton.
| River Weaver Churches Act 1840 (repealed) | 3 & 4 Vict. c. cxxiv | 4 August 1840 |
An Act to authorize the Trustees of the River Weaver, in the County of Chester, to apply part of the Funds arising from the Rates and Duties payable in respect of the Navigation of the said River, for the erecting and endowing one or more Church or Churches for the accommodation of the Watermen, Hawlers and others employed upon the said River, and connected with the Traffic thereof. (Repealed by Weaver Navigation Act 1895 (58 & 59 Vict. c. cxi))
| Lord Scudamore's Charity Act 1840 or the Hereford Improvement Act 1840 (repealed) | 3 & 4 Vict. c. cxxv | 4 August 1840 |
An Act to amend, and render more effectual, so far as relates to the Lord Scudamore's Charity Monies, the Provisions of an Act passed in the Fourteenth Year of the Reign of his Majesty King George the Third, (Note: Hereford Streets Act 1774 (14 Geo. 3. c. 38)) for improving the City of Hereford, and for other Purposes connected with the said City. (Repealed by Statute Law (Repeals) Act 2013 (c. 2))
| Monmouthshire Iron and Coal Company Act 1840 | 3 & 4 Vict. c. cxxvi | 4 August 1840 |
An Act to enable The Monmouthshire Iron and Coal Company to sue and be sued in the name of any one of their Directors or their Secretary, and to raise Money for carrying on their Works.
| London and Greenwich Railway Act 1840 | 3 & 4 Vict. c. cxxvii | 7 August 1840 |
An Act to amend and enlarge the Powers and London and Provisions of the several Acts relating to the London and Greenwich Railway.
| London and Greenwich Railway (Southwark Station) Act 1840 | 3 & 4 Vict. c. cxxviii | 7 August 1840 |
An Act to enable the London and Greenwich Railway Company to provide a Station in the Parish of Saint Olave, in the Borough of Southwark, and County of Surrey.
| London and Croydon Railway (Southwark Station) Act 1840 | 3 & 4 Vict. c. cxxix | 10 August 1840 |
An Act to enable the London and Croydon Railway Company to provide additional Station Room at the Terminus of the London and Greenwich Railway in the Parish of Saint Olave; and for other Purposes relating thereto.
| Midland Counties Railway Act 1840 (repealed) | 3 & 4 Vict. c. cxxx | 10 August 1840 |
An Act for granting further Powers to the Midland Counties Railway Company. (Repealed by Midland Railway Consolidation Act 1844 (7 & 8 Vict. c. xviii))
| Port of London Coal and Wines Import Duties Act 1840 (repealed) | 3 & 4 Vict. c. cxxxi | 11 August 1840 |
An Act to continue for Four Years, from the Fifth Day of July One thousand eight hundred and fifty-eight, the Duties now levied on Coal and Wines imported into the Port of London. (Repealed by Statute Law (Repeals) Act 2008 (c. 12))

=== Private acts ===
| Short title | Citation | Royal assent |
Long title
| Garboldisham Inclosure Act 1840 | 3 & 4 Vict. c. 1 Pr. | 23 March 1840 |
An Act for inclosing Lands in the Parish of Garboldisham, in the County of Norfolk.
| Freethorpe, &c. Inclosure Act 1840 | 3 & 4 Vict. c. 2 Pr. | 3 April 1840 |
An Act for inclosing Lands in the Parishes of Freethorpe, Limpenhoe, and Reedham, in the County of Norfolk.
| Allerton Inclosure Act 1840 | 3 & 4 Vict. c. 3 Pr. | 14 April 1840 |
An Act for inclosing Lands in the Township of Allerton, in the Parish of Bradford, in the West Riding Of the County of York.
| Hagbourne Inclosure Act 1840 | 3 & 4 Vict. c. 4 Pr. | 14 April 1840 |
An Act for inclosing Lands in the Parish of Hagbourne, otherwise East Hagbourne, in the County of Berks.
| Trinity College (Wordsworth's) Estate Act 1840 | 3 & 4 Vict. c. 5 Pr. | 19 May 1840 |
An Act for effecting an Exchange between the Master, Fellows and Scholars of the College of the Holy and Undivided Trinity in the University of Cambridge and Daniel Gurney, Esquire.
| Whittlesea Inclosure Act 1840 | 3 & 4 Vict. c. 6 Pr. | 19 May 1840 |
An Act for inclosing Lands in the Parishes of Whittlesea Saint Mary and Whittlesea Saint Andrew, in the County of Cambridge.
| Thriplow Inclosure Act 1840 | 3 & 4 Vict. c. 7 Pr. | 19 May 1840 |
An Act for inclosing Lands in the Parish of Thriplow, in the County of Cambridge.
| Forrest's Estate Act 1840 | 3 & 4 Vict. c. 8 Pr. | 4 June 1840 |
An Act to enable the Trustees of the Will of the late Roger Forrest, the elder, to make Grants in Fee and Leases for Years at reserved Rents, of certain Parts of his Trust Estates situate in the Parish of Blackburn, in the County of Lancaster.
| Great Milton Inclosure Act 1840 | 3 & 4 Vict. c. 9 Pr. | 4 June 1840 |
An Act for inclosing Lands in the Township of Great Milton, in the County of Oxford.
| Dronfield Inclosure Act 1840 | 3 & 4 Vict. c. 10 Pr. | 4 June 1840 |
An Act for inclosing Lands in the Manor of Dronfield, in the County of Derby.
| Llangerniew Inclosure Act 1840 | 3 & 4 Vict. c. 11 Pr. | 4 June 1840 |
An Act for inclosing Lands in the Parish of Llangerniew, in the County of Denbigh.
| Weybridge Rectory Act 1840 | 3 & 4 Vict. c. 12 Pr. | 19 June 1840 |
An Act to enable the Rector of Weybridge, in the County of Surrey, for the time being, to grant Building Leases of Lands in the said Parish belonging to the said Rectory.
| Stoke Bruern Inclosure Act 1840 | 3 & 4 Vict. c. 13 Pr. | 19 June 1840 |
An Act for inclosing Lands in the Parish of Stoke Bruern and Hamlet of Shutlanger otherwise Shuttlehanger, in the said Parish of Stoke Bruern, in the County of Northampton.
| Wicken Inclosure Act 1840 | 3 & 4 Vict. c. 14 Pr. | 3 July 1840 |
An Act for inclosing Lands in the Parish of Wicken, in the County of Cambridge.
| Quainton Inclosure Act 1840 | 3 & 4 Vict. c. 15 Pr. | 3 July 1840 |
An Act for inclosing Lands in the Parish of Quainton, in the County of Buckingham.
| Saint Harmon Inclosure Act 1840 | 3 & 4 Vict. c. 16 Pr. | 3 July 1840 |
An Act for inclosing, dividing and allotting certain Lands in the several Parishes of Saint Harmon, Nantmel, Llanyre and Llanviltangel Helygan, in the County of Radnor.
| Woodhouse's Estate Act 1840 | 3 & 4 Vict. c. 17 Pr. | 23 July 1840 |
An Act for enabling the Trustees of the Will of David Woodhouse, Gentleman, deceased, to sell Hereditaments thereby devised, situate in the Parishes of Crick and Ashover, in the County of Derby, and to lay out the Money arising therefrom in the Purchase of other Estates to be settled to the same Uses.
| Bacon's Estate Act 1840 | 3 & 4 Vict. c. 18 Pr. | 23 July 1840 |
An Act to enable the Trustees of the Marriage Articles of Thomas Bacon, Esquire, to grant a new Lease to Richard Hill and Anthony Hill, Esquires, of an Iron Furnace and Works and Mines, Privileges and Hereditaments held therewith, called Plymouth Works, in the Parish of Merthyr Tydvil, in the County of Glamorgan.
| Doddington Rectory Act 1840 | 3 & 4 Vict. c. 19 Pr. | 23 July 1840 |
An Act to discharge the Advowson of the Rectory of Doddington, otherwise Dornington, with the Chapels of March and Renwick, from Rent-charges and Portions charged by Settlements affecting the same.
| Mowbray's Estate Act 1840 | 3 & 4 Vict. c. 20 Pr. | 23 July 1840 |
An Act for extending the Powers of Sale and Exchange contained in the Will of George Isaac Mowbray, Esquire, deceased, and for other Purposes.
| Stanley's Charity Estate Act 1840 | 3 & 4 Vict. c. 21 Pr. | 23 July 1840 |
An Act to enable the Trustees of the Estates of Walter Stanley, Esquire, deceased, to grant Building Leases.
| Angerstein's Estate Act 1840 | 3 & 4 Vict. c. 22 Pr. | 23 July 1840 |
An Act to authorize the Sale of a Mansion House purchased under the Trusts of the Will of the late John Julius Angerstein, Esquire, deceased, and to authorize Leases to be made of the same, and also of certain Lands devised by the said Will.
| Warrington School Estate Act 1840 | 3 & 4 Vict. c. 23 Pr. | 23 July 1840 |
An Act to enable the Trustees of Boteler's Grammar School at Warrington, in the County of Lancaster, to effect a Sale to John Wright, Esquire, of an Estate called the Arrowe Estate, in Arrowe, in the County of Chester, and also to sell, exchange and lease certain other Estates belonging to the said School, and also for the general Management of the said School, and for other Purposes.
| Lady Ruthven's Estate Act 1840 | 3 & 4 Vict. c. 24 Pr. | 23 July 1840 |
An Act to vest certain parts of the Lands and Estates comprised in the Deed of Entail executed by the deceased Alexander Hamilton, of Pencaitland, on the Thirty-first day of January One thousand seven hundred and forty-seven, now in the possession of Mary Hamilton Campbell Lady Ruthven, as Heiress of Entail thereof, in Trustees, in Trust, to sell the same and apply the Proceeds and also certain Sums arising from Sales of Parts of the said Lands, under the authority of an Act of Parliament (Note: Alexander Hamilton's Estate Act 1802 (42 Geo. 3. c. 75 Pr.)) passed to that effect, towards the Payment of the Debts affecting the Lands and Barony of Winton, also in the possession of the said Lady Ruthven as Heiress of Entail thereof, so as that the said Lands and Barony of Winton, free and disburdened of Debt may descend, along with the Estate of Pencaitland, to the same Heirs of Entail.
| Shuttleworth's Estate Act 1840 | 3 & 4 Vict. c. 25 Pr. | 23 July 1840 |
An Act for vesting certain parts of the Estates devised by the Will of Robert Shuttleworth, Esquire, deceased, in Trustees for Sale, and for authorizing Grants in Fee and Building Leases for long Terms of Years, of the Residue of the same Estates, and for other Purposes.
| Gravenor's Estate Act 1840 | 3 & 4 Vict. c. 26 Pr. | 23 July 1840 |
An Act to enable Richard Gravenor and John Wood, the Committees of the Estate of Robert Gravenor, a Lunatic, to make Conveyances for carrying into execution a Partition or Division of Lands and Tenements directed by a Decree of the High Court of Chancery.
| Ruckley Grange Estate Act 1840 | 3 & 4 Vict. c. 27 Pr. | 23 July 1840 |
An Act to effect a Sale of an Estate in the Parishes of Tong and Shiffnal, in the County of Salop, called Ruckley Grange, and for applying the Purchase-money in discharge of Incumbrances, and for other Purposes.
| Swingfield Minnis Inclosure Act 1840 | 3 & 4 Vict. c. 28 Pr. | 23 July 1840 |
An Act for inclosing Swingfield Minnis, otherwise Folkestone Common, within the Manor, Hundred, Barony and Royalty of Folkestone, in the County of Kent.
| Lord Douglas's Estate Act 1840 | 3 & 4 Vict. c. 29 Pr. | 4 August 1840 |
An Act for vesting certain Parts of the Entailed Estates of Archibald Lord Douglas, of Douglas, lying in the County of Forfar, in Trustees, for the purpose of feuing the same.
| Earl of Scarborough's Estates Act 1840 | 3 & 4 Vict. c. 30 Pr. | 4 August 1840 |
An Act to enable the Right honourable John Savile Lumley Savile Earl of Scarborough, to grant Leases of Coal Mines, and other Mines and Minerals, and Quarries under the Estates in the County of York, comprised in or subject to the uses of an Indenture of Appointment and Release of the Twenty-eighth day of May, One thousand eight hundred and twelve, and to make Conveyances in Fee or Demises for long Terms of Years of the same Estates for building, repairing or otherwise improving the same under the Yearly Rents or other Reservations respectively, and to grant the Right and Privilege of making, laying down and using Way-leaves, Railroads or other Roads through or over any of the said Estates, under yearly or other Rents or Reservations.
| Chambers's Estate Act 1840 | 3 & 4 Vict. c. 31 Pr. | 4 August 1840 |
An Act to enable William Chambers, Esquire, and others, to grant Mining, Building and other Leases of certain Estates in the Counties of Carmarthen and Glamorgan, devised by the Will of Sir John Stepney, Baronet, deceased.
| Gregson's Estate Act 1840 | 3 & 4 Vict. c. 32 Pr. | 4 August 1840 |
An Act for empowering the Tenant for Life under the Will of Anthony Gregson, Esquire, deceased, and the Trustees of the same Will, to sell and exchange certain Freehold Estates, situate in the County of Northumberland and in the Town and Borough of Berwick-upon-Tweed, and certain Tithes respectively devised by such Will, and also to grant Mining and other Leases of the said Estates, in the County of Northumberland, and of certain other Freehold Estates devised by the same Will, situate in the County Palatine of Durham, and to grant Building, Repairing and other Leases of the said Estates in the Counties of Northumberland and Durham, and Town and Borough of Berwick-upon-Tweed.
| Whalley's Estate Act 1840 | 3 & 4 Vict. c. 33 Pr. | 4 August 1840 |
An Act for enabling the Revocation of a term of Ninety-nine years and the Trusts thereof, affecting the settled Estate of John Whalley, Esquire.
| Lord Vaux of Harrowden's Estate Act 1840 | 3 & 4 Vict. c. 34 Pr. | 4 August 1840 |
An Act for the continuance of certain Powers contained in the Settlement on the Marriage of Charles Mostyn, Esquire, now deceased, and for authorizing the Investment of the Monies to arise under the Powers of Sale and Exchange contained in such Settlement, in the Purchase of Estates in Ireland as well as in England and Wales.
| Duke of Bridgewater's Estate Act 1840 | 3 & 4 Vict. c. 35 Pr. | 4 August 1840 |
An Act to enable the Trustees of the Will of the late Duke of Bridgewater to make Conveyances in Fee or Demises for long Terms of Years, of Parts of his Trust Estates in the Counties of Lancaster and Chester, for building on and improving the same, and to grant Leases of Coal and other Mines, and of Waste Lands, and also for removing Doubts as to the Right of nominating a Minister to the Church or Chapel lately erected by the Right honourable Lord Francis Egerton, on part of the said Trust Estates.
| Adderley's Estate Act 1840 | 3 & 4 Vict. c. 36 Pr. | 10 August 1840 |
An Act for authorizing the Exchange of Parts of the Lands and Estates settled by the Will of the late Charles Bowyer Adderley, Esquire, and the Sale of other Parts thereof.
| Fiers' Naturalization Act 1840 (Note: This act was not printed by the Queen's Printer) | 3 & 4 Vict. c. 37 Pr. | 23 March 1840 |
An Act for naturalizing Charles Fiers.
| Swain's Naturalization Act 1840 | 3 & 4 Vict. c. 38 Pr. | 23 March 1840 |
An Act for naturalizing Samuel Swain.
| Hausburg's Naturalization Act 1840 | 3 & 4 Vict. c. 39 Pr. | 23 March 1840 |
An Act for naturalizing Friedrich Ludwig Leopold Hausburg's Hausburg.
| Promoli's Naturalization Act 1840 | 3 & 4 Vict. c. 40 Pr. | 23 March 1840 |
An Act for naturalizing August Wilhelm Bernhard Promoli.
| Perry's Divorce Act 1840 | 3 & 4 Vict. c. 41 Pr. | 3 April 1840 |
An Act to dissolve the Marriage of James Perry, Esquire, with Elizabeth Margaret his Wife, and to enable him to marry again, and for other purposes.
| Lloyd's Divorce Act 1840 | 3 & 4 Vict. c. 42 Pr. | 3 April 1840 |
An Act to dissolve the Marriage of George Lloyd, Esquire, with Athalie Pulcherie Clotilde, his now Wife, and to enable him to marry again, and for other purposes therein mentioned.
| Schultze's Naturalization Act 1840 | 3 & 4 Vict. c. 43 Pr. | 19 May 1840 |
An Act for naturalizing Frederick Schultze.
| Wolff's Naturalization Act 1840 | 3 & 4 Vict. c. 44 Pr. | 19 May 1840 |
An Act for naturalizing Arnold Julius Wolff.
| Martinez' Naturalization Act 1840 | 3 & 4 Vict. c. 45 Pr. | 4 June 1840 |
An Act for naturalizing Gregorio Josè Martinez del Rio.
| Duke Sforza Cesarini's Naturalization Act 1840 | 3 & 4 Vict. c. 46 Pr. | 4 June 1840 |
An Act for naturalizing His Excellency Don Lorenzo Duke Sforza Cesarini.
| Liebert's Naturalization Act 1840 | 3 & 4 Vict. c. 47 Pr. | 4 June 1840 |
An Act for naturalizing Alexander Liebert.
| Battersby's Divorce Act 1840 | 3 & 4 Vict. c. 48 Pr. | 3 July 1840 |
An Act to dissolve the Marriage of Ann Battersby with Arthur Battersby, her now Husband, and to enable her to marry again, and for other Purposes therein mentioned.
| Deane's Divorce Act 1840 | 3 & 4 Vict. c. 49 Pr. | 23 July 1840 |
An Act to dissolve the Marriage of Joseph Groome Deane with Rachael his now Wife, and to enable him to marry again, and for other Purposes therein mentioned.
| Warr's Divorce Act 1840 | 3 & 4 Vict. c. 50 Pr. | 23 July 1840 |
An Act to dissolve the Marriage of Jonathan Warr, with Betty his now Wife, and to enable him to marry again, and for other Purposes therein mentioned.
| Grant's Divorce Act 1840 | 3 & 4 Vict. c. 51 Pr. | 4 August 1840 |
An Act to dissolve the Marriage of Alexander Grant, Esquire, with Maria Theresa his now Wife, and to enable him to marry again, and for other Purposes.
| Close's Divorce Act 1840 | 3 & 4 Vict. c. 52 Pr. | 4 August 1840 |
An Act to dissolve the Marriage of James Close, with Louisa his now Wife, and to enable him to marry again, and for other purposes therein mentioned.
| Trafford's Divorce Act 1840 | 3 & 4 Vict. c. 53 Pr. | 4 August 1840 |
An Act to dissolve the Marriage of Edward William Trafford, Esquire, with Louisa his now Wife, and to enable him to marry again, and for other Purposes therein mentioned.

=== Sources ===
- The Statutes of the United Kingdom of Great Britain and Ireland. Vol. 15, Part 2. 1840 – via Google Books.
- Journal of the House of Commons (PDF). Vol. 95. London: His Majesty's Stationery Office. pp. 3–670 – via parliament.uk.
- Chronological Table of and Index to the Statutes. Vol. 1: To the End of the Session 59 Vict. Sess. 2 (1895) (13th ed.). London: Her Majesty's Stationery Office. 1896. pp. 299–305 – via Google Books.
- The Statutes of the United Kingdom of Great Britain and Ireland, 3 & 4 Victoria. London. 1840 – via Internet Archive.
- The Statutes of the United Kingdom of Great Britain and Ireland, 3 & 4 Victoria. London. 1840 – via Google Books.
- A Collection of the Public General Statutes passed in the Third and Fourth Year of the Reign of Her Majesty Queen Victoria, 1840. London: Eyre and Spottiswoode. 1840 – via Internet Archive.

== See also ==
- List of acts of the Parliament of the United Kingdom
