= Assessed Taxes Act 1812 =

Act of the Parliament of the United Kingdom

- Act of Parliament
- Parliament of the United Kingdom
- Long title: An Act for granting to His Majesty certain new and additional Duties of Assessed Taxes; and for consolidating the same with the former Duties of Assessed Taxes.
- Citation: 52 Geo. 3. c. 93
- Territorial extent: England and Wales; Scotland; (Note: Section 1.)

Dates
- Royal assent: 9 July 1812
- Commencement: 9 July 1812 (Note: The Acts of Parliament (Commencement) Act 1793.)
- Repealed: 24 June 1869

Other legislation
- Repealed by: Revenue Act 1869

Status: Repealed

Text of statute as originally enacted

The Assessed Taxes Act 1812 (52 Geo. 3. c. 93) was an act of the Parliament of the United Kingdom that granted new and additional duties of assessed taxes in Great Britain and consolidated them with the former duties of assessed taxes.

== Subsequent developments ==
The whole act was repealed by section 39 of, and schedule (E.) to, the Revenue Act 1869 (32 & 33 Vict. c. 14), which came into force on 24 June 1869.
