= Assessed Taxes Act 1840 =

Act of the Parliament of the United Kingdom

- Act of Parliament
- Parliament of the United Kingdom
- Long title: An Act to continue Compositions for Assessed Taxes until the Fifth Day of April One thousand eight hundred and forty two.
- Citation: 3 & 4 Vict. c. 38
- Territorial extent: United Kingdom

Dates
- Royal assent: 4 August 1810
- Commencement: 4 August 1810 (Note: The Acts of Parliament (Commencement) Act 1793.)
- Expired: 5 April 1842 (Note: Section 1.)
- Repealed: 24 June 1869
Other legislation
Repealed by	Revenue Act 1869
Relates to	Assessed Taxes Act 1834; Assessed Taxes, etc. Act 1839

Status: Repealed

Text of statute as originally enacted

The Assessed Taxes Act 1840 (3 & 4 Vict. c. 38) was an act of the Parliament of the United Kingdom. The abridgement of the act is shown dated 29 July 1839; the previous act expired on 5 April the following year. The act was amended again in 1841, 1845, 1851 and 1854.

== Subsequent developments ==
The whole act was repealed by section 39 of, and schedule (E.) to, the Revenue Act 1869 (32 & 33 Vict. c. 14), which came into force on 24 June 1869.
