= Revenue Act 1869 =

Act of the Parliament of the United Kingdom

Revenue Act 1869 (Note: The citation of this act by this short title was authorised by section 1 of, and the first schedule to, the Short Titles Act 1896. Due to the repeal of those provisions it is now authorised by section 19(2) of the Interpretation Act 1978.)
- Act of Parliament
- Parliament of the United Kingdom
- Long title: An Act to grant certain Duties of Customs and Inland Revenue, and to repeal and alter other Duties of Customs and Inland Revenue.
- Citation: 32 & 33 Vict. c. 14
- Territorial extent: United Kingdom

Dates
- Royal assent: 24 June 1869
- Commencement: 24 June 1869 (Note: The Acts of Parliament (Commencement) Act 1793.)
- Repealed: 1 January 1953

Other legislation
- Amends: See § Repealed enactments
- Repeals/revokes: See § Repealed enactments
- Amended by: Customs and Inland Revenue Act 1874
- Repealed by: Customs and Excise Act 1952

Status: Repealed

Text of statute as originally enacted

The Revenue Act 1869 (32 & 33 Vict. c. 14) was an act of the Parliament of the United Kingdom that granted certain duties of customs and inland revenue, and repealed and altered other duties of customs and inland revenue, in the United Kingdom.

== Provisions ==
The act granted duties of customs on tea and beer (schedule (A.)) and duties of income tax, land tax and inhabited house duty (schedule (B.)), and abolished the customs duties on corn, grain, meal and flour and other similar articles. It also repealed the percentage duty on fire insurances, the excise licence for the sale of tea, coffee, cocoa nuts, chocolate and pepper, and a substantial body of earlier enactments relating to assessed taxes and excise duties.

=== Repealed enactments ===
Sections 12, 14 and 39 of the act repealed 67 enactments, listed in schedules (C.), (D.) and (E.) to the act, respectively.

==== Schedule (C): Fire insurance ====
Schedule (C) — Fire insurance
Citation	Short title	Description	Extent of repeal
22 Geo. 3. c. 48	Fire Insurance Duty Act 1782	An Act for charging a duty on persons whose property shall be insured against loss by fire.	The whole act.
26 Geo. 3. c. 82	Stamps (No. 3) Act 1786	An Act for the more effectually carrying into execution the laws relating to the duties on stamped vellum, &c.	Section 9.
50 Geo. 3. c. 35	Stamps Act 1810	An Act for altering the mode of collecting the duty on insurances against loss by fire upon property in His Majesty's islands and possessions in the West Indies, &c.	Sections from 1 to 10, both inclusive.
55 Geo. 3. c. 101	Stamps Act 1815	An Act to regulate the collection of stamp duties on matters in respect of which licences may be granted by the commissioners of stamps in Ireland.	Sections from 14 to 27, both inclusive.
55 Geo. 3. c. 184	Stamp Act 1815	An Act for repealing the stamp duties on deeds, &c.	Sections from 32 to 36, both inclusive.
9 Geo. 4. c. 13	Stamps on Fire Insurances Act 1828	An Act for further regulating the payment of the duties under the management of the commissioners of stamps on insurances from loss or damage by fire.	The whole act.
3 & 4 Will. 4. c. 23	Stamps Act 1833	An Act to reduce the stamp duties on advertisements, &c.	Section 6.
5 & 6 Vict. c. 79	Railway Passenger Duty Act 1842	An Act to repeal the duties payable on stage carriages, &c.	Section 20.
13 & 14 Vict. c. 97	Stamp Duties Act 1850	An Act to repeal certain stamp duties, &c.	Section 19.
19 & 20 Vict. c. 22	Stamps Act 1856	An Act to amend the laws relating to the duties on fire insurances.	So far as it relates to the duty on fire insurances repealed by this act.
27 & 28 Vict. c. 18	Revenue (No. 1) Act 1864	An Act to grant certain duties of customs and inland revenue.	Sections 9 and 10.

==== Schedule (D): Licences to sell coffee, tea, cocoa nuts, chocolate, and pepper ====
Schedule (D) — Licences to sell coffee, tea, cocoa nuts, chocolate, and pepper
Citation	Short title	Description	Extent of repeal
10 Geo. 1. c. 10	Excise Act 1723	An Act for repealing certain duties therein mentioned payable upon coffee, tea, &c.	Sections 9, 10, 14, and 41.
59 Geo. 3. c. 53	Excise Act 1819	An Act for granting to His Majesty certain additional duties of excise on tea, coffee, &c.	The whole act.
24 & 25 Vict. c. 21	Revenue (No. 1) Act 1861	An Act for granting to Her Majesty certain duties of excise and stamps.	Section 8.
27 & 28 Vict. c. 18	Revenue (No. 1) Act 1864	An Act to grant certain duties of customs and inland revenue.	Sections 6 and 7, and so much of schedule B. as relates to licences to sell tea.

==== Schedule (E): Assessed taxes and excise duties ====
Schedule (E) — Assessed taxes and excise duties
Citation	Short title	Description	Extent of repeal
50 Geo. 3. c. 104	Assessed Taxes Act 1810	An Act for altering the amount of certain duties of assessed taxes, &c. &c.	The whole act.
51 Geo. 3. c. 72	Assessed Taxes Act 1811	An Act for granting exemptions in certain cases from the payment of the duties charged in respect of servants, &c. &c.	The whole act. (Note: The act was already repealed by the Statute Law Revision Act 1861 (24 & 25 Vict. c. 101).)
52 Geo. 3. c. 93	Assessed Taxes Act 1812	An Act for granting to His Majesty certain new and additional duties of assessed taxes, &c.	The whole act.
54 Geo. 3. c. 141	Duties on Killing Game Act 1814	An Act to alter so much of an Act made in the fifty-second year of His present Majesty as relates to the duties payable in respect of killing game.	The whole act.
55 Geo. 3. c. 19	Intoxicating Liquors (Ireland) Act 1815	An Act to grant certain duties of excise, &c. &c.	So much of the schedule (A.) as relates to a duty on “any licence to any person to let to hire any horse for the purpose of travelling post by the mile or from stage to stage.”
56 Geo. 3. c. 66	Assessed Taxes Act 1816	An Act for reducing the duties payable on horses used for the purposes therein mentioned for two years, &c.	The whole act.
58 Geo. 3. c. 16	Assessed Taxes Act 1818	An Act to continue until the fifth day of April one thousand eight hundred and nineteen and amend an Act of the fifty-sixth year of His present Majesty for reducing the duties payable on horses used for the purposes therein mentioned.	The whole act.
58 Geo. 3. c. 17	Assessed Taxes (No. 2) Act 1818	An Act for charging certain duties on four-wheeled carriages constructed and drawn in the manner therein described.	The whole act.
59 Geo. 3. c. 13	Assessed Taxes Act 1819	An Act to continue two Acts of the fifty-sixth and fifty-eighth years of His present Majesty for reducing the duties payable on horses used for the purposes therein mentioned, &c. &c.	The whole act.
59 Geo. 3. c. 51	Assessed Taxes (No. 2) Act 1819	An Act to relieve persons compounding for their assessed taxes from an annual assessment for the term of three years.	The whole act.
59 Geo. 3. c. 118	Assessed Taxes (No. 3) Act 1819	An Act to give relief in certain cases of assessments of taxes in Great Britain, &c. &c.	The whole act.
1 Geo. 4. c. 73	Assessed Taxes Act 1820	An Act to extend the period allowed to persons compounding for their assessed taxes, &c.	The whole act.
1 & 2 Geo. 4. c. 20	Duties on Horses Act 1821	An Act to continue until the fifth day of April one thousand eight hundred and twenty-three several Acts of His late Majesty for reducing the duties payable on horses used for the purposes therein mentioned.	The whole act.
1 & 2 Geo. 4. c. 110	Horse Duties Act 1821	An Act for repealing the duties imposed on husbandry horses, &c. &c.	The whole act.
1 & 2 Geo. 4. c. 113	Taxes Act 1821	An Act to continue several Acts for the relief of persons compounding for assessed taxes, &c. &c.	The whole act, except sections 34 and 35.
3 Geo. 4. c. 50	Assessed Taxes Act 1822	An Act to extend the period allowed to persons compounding for their assessed taxes, &c.	The whole act.
4 Geo. 4. c. 45	Assessed Taxes Act 1823	An Act for allowing persons to compound for their assessed taxes, &c. &c.	The whole act.
5 Geo. 4. c. 44	Exemption from House Tax Act 1824	An Act for allowing persons to compound for their assessed taxes, &c.	The whole act, except section 4.
6 Geo. 4. c. 7	House Tax Act 1825	An Act for the further repeal of certain duties of assessed taxes, &c.	The whole act, except sections 2, 3, 6, 7, and 11.
7 Geo. 4. c. 22	Assessed Taxes Act 1826	An Act to enable persons to continue their compositions for assessed taxes, &c. &c.	The whole act.
10 Geo. 4. c. 21	Assessed Taxes Act 1829	An Act to continue compositions for the assessed taxes for a further term of one year.	The whole act.
11 Geo. 4 & 1 Will. 4. c. 35	Assessed Taxes Act 1830	An Act to continue compositions for assessed taxes for a further term of one year, &c.	The whole act.
1 & 2 Will. 4. c. 7	Assessed Taxes Act 1831	An Act to continue compositions for assessed taxes until the fifth day of April one thousand eight hundred and thirty-three, and to grant relief in certain cases.	The whole act.
1 & 2 Will. 4. c. 22	London Hackney Carriage Act 1831	An Act to amend the laws relating to hackney carriages, &c. &c.	Sections 2 and 3, 5 to 17 both inclusive, 19 to 25 both inclusive, 30 to 33 both inclusive, 49, 58, and 61. The whole of schedules (A.), (B.), (C.), and form No. 1 in schedule D.
2 & 3 Will. 4. c. 82	Duties on Carriages Act 1832	An Act to reduce the duties now payable in certain cases on carriages with less than four wheels.	The whole act. (Note: The act was already repealed by the Assessed Taxes (No. 2) Act 1833 (3 & 4 Will. 4. c. 39).)
2 & 3 Will. 4. c. 113	House Tax Act 1832	An Act to continue until the fifth day of April one thousand eight hundred and thirty-four compositions for the assessed taxes, &c.	The whole act, except section 3.
2 & 3 Will. 4. c. 120	Stage Carriages Act 1832	An Act to repeal the duties under the management of the Commissioners of stamps on stage carriages and on horses let for hire in Great Britain, and to grant other duties in lieu thereof, &c.	Sections 2 to 5 both inclusive, 8 to 34 both inclusive, 50 to 100 both inclusive, the whole of schedule (A.), and forms Nos. 1, 2, 3, 4, and 5 in schedule (B.)
3 & 4 Will. 4. c. 34	Assessed Taxes Act 1833	An Act to continue until the fifth day of April one thousand eight hundred and thirty-five compositions for the assessed taxes.	The whole act.
3 & 4 Will. 4. c. 39	Assessed Taxes (No. 2) Act 1833	An Act to reduce certain of the duties on dwelling houses, and to repeal other duties of assessed taxes.	The whole act.
4 & 5 Will. 4. c. 54	Assessed Taxes Act 1834	An Act to continue for five years from the fifth day of April one thousand eight hundred and thirty-five and to amend the Acts for authorizing a composition for assessed taxes.	The whole act.
4 & 5 Will. 4. c. 73	Assessed Taxes (No. 2) Act 1834	An Act to grant relief from the duties of assessed taxes in certain cases.	The whole act, except section 2.
5 & 6 Will. 4. c. 64	Stamp Duties Act 1835	An Act to alter certain duties of stamps and assessed taxes, &c.	The whole act, except sections 1 to 7 both inclusive, and sections 10 to 13 both inclusive.
6 & 7 Will. 4. c. 45	Stamps and Excise Act 1836	An Act to transfer the collection and management of the duties in Great Britain on horses let for hire, &c. from the Commissioners of Stamps and Taxes to the Commissioners of Excise.	The whole act.
6 & 7 Will. 4. c. 65	Game Laws (England) Local Taxes, etc. (Scotland) Act 1836	An Act for granting relief from the duties of assessed taxes, &c. &c.	The whole act, except sections 9 to 12 both inclusive.
2 & 3 Vict. c. 35	Assessed Taxes, etc. Act 1839	An Act to continue for one year compositions for assessed taxes, &c. &c.	The whole act.
2 & 3 Vict. c. 66	Duty on Stage Carriages Act 1839	An Act to reduce certain of the duties now payable on stage carriages.	The whole act.
3 & 4 Vict. c. 38	Assessed Taxes Act 1840	An Act to continue compositions for assessed taxes until the fifth day of April one thousand eight hundred and forty-two.	The whole act.
4 & 5 Vict. c. 26	Assessed Taxes Act 1841	An Act to continue compositions for assessed taxes until the fifth day of April one thousand eight hundred and forty-three.	The whole act.
5 & 6 Vict. c. 79	Railway Passenger Duty Act 1842	An Act to repeal the duties payable on stage carriages, and on passengers conveyed upon railways, &c. &c.	Sections 8 to 12, both inclusive, and so much of the schedule as relates to the duties on stage carriages and passengers conveyed upon railways.
6 & 7 Vict. c. 86	London Hackney Carriages Act 1843	An Act for regulating hackney and stage carriages in and near London.	Section 26.
8 & 9 Vict. c. 36	Assessed Taxes Act 1845	An Act to continue for five years and to amend the Acts for authorizing a composition for assessed taxes.	The whole act.
13 & 14 Vict. c. 96	Assessed Taxes Composition Act 1850	An Act to continue and amend the Acts for authorizing a composition for assessed taxes.	The whole act.
14 & 15 Vict. c. 33	Assessed Taxes Act 1851	An Act to enlarge the period allowed for compounding for assessed taxes.	The whole act.
16 & 17 Vict. c. 88	Duties on Horses Let for Hire Act 1853	An Act to repeal the duties payable in respect of horses let for hire, and to grant new duties on licences to let horses for hire.	The whole act.
16 & 17 Vict. c. 90	Land Tax Redemption (Investment) Act 1853	An Act to repeal certain duties of assessed taxes, and to grant other duties of the same description, &c.	The whole act, except section 8.
16 & 17 Vict. c. 127	London Hackney Carriage (No. 2) Act 1853	An Act to reduce the duties payable in respect of hackney carriages used in the metropolis, &c. &c.	The whole act, except sections 13 to 17, both inclusive.
17 & 18 Vict. c. 1	Assessed Taxes Act 1854	An Act to explain and amend an Act of the last session relating to the duties of assessed taxes, &c.	The whole act, except section 5.
18 & 19 Vict. c. 78	Inland Revenue Act 1855	An Act to reduce certain duties payable on stage carriages, &c.	Sections 1, 2, and 3.
23 & 24 Vict. c. 113	Excise Act 1860	An Act to grant duties of excise on chicory, &c. &c.	Section 38.
26 & 27 Vict. c. 33	Revenue Act 1863	An Act for granting to Her Majesty certain duties of inland revenue, and to amend the laws relating to the inland revenue.	Sections 6 to 12, both inclusive.
29 & 30 Vict. c. 36	Revenue Act 1866	An Act to grant, alter, and repeal certain duties of customs and inland revenue, &c.	The whole of schedule (B.)
29 & 30 Vict. c. 64	Inland Revenue Act 1866	An Act to amend the laws relating to the inland revenue.	Section 10.

== Subsequent developments ==
The whole act was repealed by section 320(1) of, and part I of the twelfth schedule to, the Customs and Excise Act 1952 (15 & 16 Geo. 6 & 1 Eliz. 2. c. 44), which came into force on 1 January 1953.
