= Muirtown =

Area of Inverness in Scotland

Coordinates: 57°29′06″N 4°15′17″W

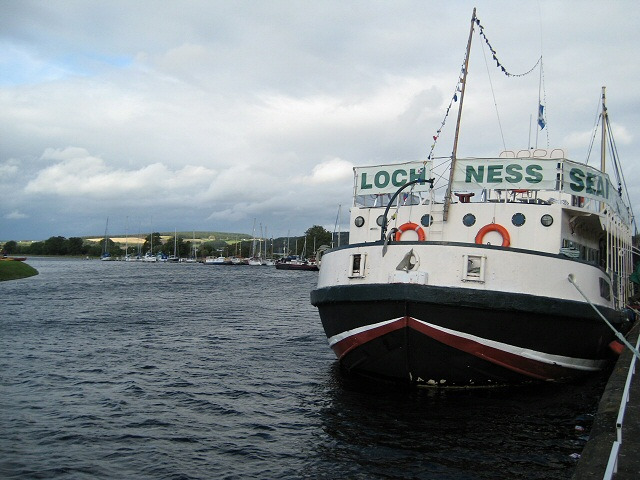
Muirtown basin

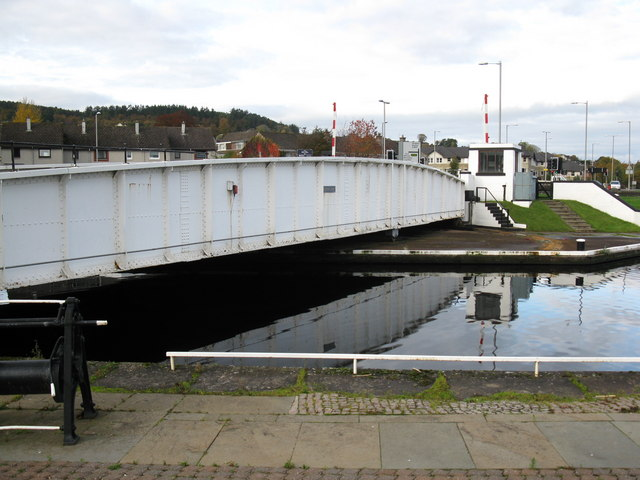
Muirtown swing bridge

Muirtown (Gaelic: Baile an Fhraoich) is an area in the west end of the city of Inverness in the Scottish Highlands. It contains the Muirtown basin and Muirtown Primary School.

An expansion of the Caledonian Canal close to its northeastern termination, the Muirtown Basin lies between Clachnaharry and Muirtown a mile (1.5 km) northwest of Inverness city centre. Planned in the early 19th century as a second harbour for the city by the canal's engineer Thomas Telford (1757–1834), it could not cope with the size of ships which were soon in use and thus never fulfilled its potential. It now serves as a marina. Immediately to the south of the basin are the Muirtown Locks, a flight of four locks on the Caledonian Canal at Muirtown, a mile (1.5 km) west northwest of Inverness city centre. The Muirtown Swing Bridge crosses the canal immediately to the north.

In popular culture

In the John Buchan novel Mr Standfast, Muirtown is the scene of an episode in the adventures of Richard Hannay as he seeks to avoid the Scottish police while simultaneously hunting a spy.
