= List of acts of the Parliament of Great Britain from 1769 =

This is a complete list of acts of the Parliament of Great Britain for the year 1769.

For acts passed until 1707, see the list of acts of the Parliament of England and the list of acts of the Parliament of Scotland. See also the list of acts of the Parliament of Ireland.

For acts passed from 1801 onwards, see the list of acts of the Parliament of the United Kingdom. For acts of the devolved parliaments and assemblies in the United Kingdom, see the list of acts of the Scottish Parliament, the list of acts of the Northern Ireland Assembly, and the list of acts and measures of Senedd Cymru; see also the list of acts of the Parliament of Northern Ireland.

The number shown after each act's title is its chapter number. Acts are cited using this number, preceded by the year(s) of the reign during which the relevant parliamentary session was held; thus the Union with Ireland Act 1800 is cited as "39 & 40 Geo. 3. c. 67", meaning the 67th act passed during the session that started in the 39th year of the reign of George III and which finished in the 40th year of that reign. Note that the modern convention is to use Arabic numerals in citations (thus "41 Geo. 3" rather than "41 Geo. III"). Acts of the last session of the Parliament of Great Britain and the first session of the Parliament of the United Kingdom are both cited as "41 Geo. 3".

Acts passed by the Parliament of Great Britain did not have a short title; however, some of these acts have subsequently been given a short title by acts of the Parliament of the United Kingdom (such as the Short Titles Act 1896).

Before the Acts of Parliament (Commencement) Act 1793 came into force on 8 April 1793, acts passed by the Parliament of Great Britain were deemed to have come into effect on the first day of the session in which they were passed. Because of this, the years given in the list below may in fact be the year before a particular act was passed.

== 9 Geo. 3 ==
The second session of the 13th Parliament of Great Britain, which met from 8 November 1768 until 9 May 1769.

This session was also traditionally cited as 9 G. 3.

=== Public acts ===
Short title	Citation	Royal assent
Long title
Exportation Act 1769 (repealed)	9 Geo. 3. c. 1	25 November 1768
An Act to prohibit for a further Time, the Exportation of Corn, Grain, Meal, Malt, Flour, Bread, Biscuit, and Starch; and also the Extraction of Low Wines and Spirits from Wheat and Wheat Flour. (Repealed by Statute Law Revision Act 1867 (30 & 31 Vict. c. 59))
Malt Duties Act 1769 (repealed)	9 Geo. 3. c. 2	20 December 1768
An Act for continuing and granting to His Majesty certain Duties upon Malt, Mum, Cyder, and Perry, for the Service of the Year One thousand seven hundred and sixty-nine. (Repealed by Statute Law Revision Act 1867 (30 & 31 Vict. c. 59))
Mutiny Act 1769 (repealed)	9 Geo. 3. c. 3	20 December 1768
An Act for punishing Mutiny and Desertion, and for the better Payment of the Army and their Quarters. (Repealed by Statute Law Revision Act 1867 (30 & 31 Vict. c. 59))
Importation Act 1769 (repealed)	9 Geo. 3. c. 4	20 December 1768
An Act to allow for a further Time, the free Importation of Rice into this Kingdom, from His Majesty's Colonies in North America. (Repealed by Statute Law Revision Act 1867 (30 & 31 Vict. c. 59))
Land Tax Act 1769 (repealed)	9 Geo. 3. c. 5	20 December 1768
An Act for granting an Aid to His Majesty, by a Land Tax, to be raised in Great Britain for the Service of the Year One thousand seven hundred and sixty-nine. (Repealed by Statute Law Revision Act 1867 (30 & 31 Vict. c. 59))
Smuggling, etc. Act 1769 (repealed)	9 Geo. 3. c. 6	20 December 1768
An Act for the more effectually preventing the clandestine Importation of Foreign Spirits, and for explaining. such Part of An Act, made in the Fifth Year of the Reign of His present Majesty, (Note: Stamp (No. 2) Act 1765 (5 Geo. 3. c. 46)) as relates to the Penalties inflicted upon Persons selling Ale, Beer, or other Exciseable Liquors, by Retail without Licence; and for taking away certain Powers granted by former Acts for punishing Persons convicted of retailing Spirituous Liquors without Licence. (Repealed by Statute Law Revision Act 1867 (30 & 31 Vict. c. 59))
Marine Mutiny Act 1769 (repealed)	9 Geo. 3. c. 7	20 December 1768
An Act for the Regulation of His Majesty's Marine Forces while on Shore. (Repealed by Statute Law Revision Act 1867 (30 & 31 Vict. c. 59))
Wells Harbour and Quay Act 1769 (repealed)	9 Geo. 3. c. 8	20 December 1768
An Act for repairing, improving, and better preserving, of the Harbour and Quay of Wells, in the County of Norfolk. (Repealed by Wells Harbour and Quay Act 1835 (5 & 6 Will. 4. c. xlviii))
Importation (No. 2) Act 1769 (repealed)	9 Geo. 3. c. 9	2 February 1769
An Act to continue an Act, made in the Eighth Year of the Reign of His present Majesty, (Note: Importation Act 1768 (8 Geo. 3. c. 9)) intituled, "An Act to continue and amend an Act, made in the Fifth Year of the Reign of His present Majesty, (Note: Importation Act 1765 (5 Geo. 3. c. 1)) intituled, 'An Act for Importation of Salted Beef, Pork, Bacon, and Butter, from Ireland, for a limited Time;' and for allowing the Importation of Salted Beef, Pork, Bacon, and Butter, from the British Dominions in America, for a limited Time." (Repealed by Statute Law Revision Act 1867 (30 & 31 Vict. c. 59))
Streets (New Windsor) Act 1769 (repealed)	9 Geo. 3. c. 10	21 March 1769
An Act for the better paving, cleansing, lighting, and watching, the Streets and Lanes, in the Parish and Borough of New Windsor, in the County of Berks, and for preventing Nuisances and Annoyances therein. (Repealed by Ministry of Health Provisional Order Confirmation (New Windsor Extension) Act 1920 (10 & 11 Geo. 5. c. cxxxv))
Use of Plate Act 1769 (repealed)	9 Geo. 3. c. 11	21 March 1769
An Act for repealing so much of an Act made in the Seventh and Eighth Years of the Reign of King William the Third, intituled, "An Act to encourage the bringing Plate into the Mint to be coined, and for the further remedying the ill State of the Coin of the Kingdom," (Note: Coin Act 1695 (7 & 8 Will. 3. c. 1)) as restrains any Person keeping an Inn, Tavern, Ale House, or Victualling House, or selling Wine, Ale, Beer, or any other Liquors, by Retail, from publickly using any wrought or manufactured Plate, or any Utensil or Vessel thereof, except Spoons; and for putting an End to Prosecutions commenced for Offences against such Part of the said Act. (Repealed by Statute Law Revision Act 1867 (30 & 31 Vict. c. 59))
Indemnity Act 1769 (repealed)	9 Geo. 3. c. 12	21 March 1769
An Act to indemnify such Persons as have omitted to qualify themselves for Offices and Employments within the Time limited by Law, and for allowing further Time for that Purpose; and to indemnifying Members and Officers in Cities, Corporations, and Borough Towns, whose Admissions have been omitted to be stamped according to Law, or having been stamped, have been lost or mislaid; and for allowing them Time to provide Admissions duly stamped. (Repealed by Statute Law Revision Act 1867 (30 & 31 Vict. c. 59))
Streets (Westminster) Act 1769 (repealed)	9 Geo. 3. c. 13	21 March 1769
An Act for the better paving, cleansing, lighting, and watching, the Liberty of Saint Martin le Grand, within the City and Liberty of Westminster, in the County of Middlesex, and for preventing Obstructions and Annoyances therein. (Repealed by City of London and Westminster Streets and Post Office Act 1815 (55 Geo. 3. c. xci))
Land Tax (Commissioners) Act 1769 (repealed)	9 Geo. 3. c. 14	21 March 1769
An Act for appointing Commissioners for putting in Execution an Act of this Session of Parliament, intituled, "An Act for granting an Aid to His Majesty by a Land Tax, to be raised in Great Britain, for the Service of the Year One thousand seven hundred and sixty-nine;" (Note: Land Tax Act 1769 (9 Geo. 3. c. 5)) and for securing and preserving Duplicates of Assessments and other Papers relating to the Land Tax. (Repealed by Statute Law Revision Act 1867 (30 & 31 Vict. c. 59))
Unfunded Debt Act 1769 (repealed)	9 Geo. 3. c. 15	21 March 1769
An Act for raising a certain Sum of Money by Loans or Exchequer Bills, for the Service of the Year One thousand seven hundred and sixty-nine. (Repealed by Statute Law Revision Act 1867 (30 & 31 Vict. c. 59))
Crown Suits Act 1769 or the Nullum Tempus Act 1769 or Sir George Savile's Act (repealed)	9 Geo. 3. c. 16	21 March 1769
An Act to amend and render more effectual an Act, made in the Twenty-First Year of the Reign of King James the First, intituled, "An Act for the general Quiet of the Subjects, against all Pretences of Concealment whatsoever." (Note: Crown Suits, etc. Act 1623 (21 Jas. 1. c. 2)) (Repealed by Limitation Act 1939 (2 & 3 Geo. 6. c. 21))
Theatres (York and Hull) Act 1769 (repealed)	9 Geo. 3. c. 17	23 March 1769
An Act for enabling His Majesty to license a Playhouse in the City of York, (Note: York Theatre Royal.) and in the Town and County of the Town of Kingston upon Hull. (Note: Theatre Royal, Finkle Street, Hull.) (Repealed by Statute Law Revision Act 1948 (11 & 12 Geo. 6. c. 62))
Mutiny in America Act 1769 (repealed)	9 Geo. 3. c. 18	23 March 1769
An Act for amending and further continuing an Act, of the Sixth Year of His present Majesty's Reign, (Note: Mutiny in America Act 1766 (6 Geo. 3. c. 18)) intituled, "An Act to amend and render more effectual, in His Majesty's Dominions in America, an Act, passed in this present Session of Parliament, (Note: Mutiny Act 1766 (6 Geo. 3. c. 8)) intituled, 'An Act for punishing Mutiny and Desertion, and for the better Payment of the Army and their Quarters.'" (Repealed by Statute Law Revision Act 1867 (30 & 31 Vict. c. 59))
Court of Chancery Act 1769 (repealed)	9 Geo. 3. c. 19	21 April 1769
An Act to empower the High Court of Chancery to lay out, upon Government Securities, a further Sum of Money, not exceeding a Sum therein limited, out of the Common and General Cash in the Bank of England, belonging to the Suitors of the said Court, and to apply the Interest arising therefrom towards answering the Charges of the Office of the Accountant General of the said Court. (Repealed by Courts of Justice (Salaries and Funds) Act 1869 (32 & 33 Vict. c. 91))
Shire Halls, etc. Act 1769 (repealed)	9 Geo. 3. c. 20	21 April 1769
An Act to enable the justices of the Peace in the General Quarter Sessions of their respective Counties and Divisions to repair the Shire Halls, County Halls, or other Buildings, wherein the Assizes or Grand Sessions are usually held. (Repealed by County Buildings Act 1826 (7 Geo. 4. c. 63))
Gainsborough (Improvement) Act 1769	9 Geo. 3. c. 21	21 April 1769
An Act for the more effectual paving, cleansing, lighting, and watching, the Streets, Lanes, Alleys, and Public Passages, in the Town of Gainsburgh, in the County of Lincoln, and for laying a Duty on all Coals brought to the said Town to be sold, and for applying the same to such Purposes.
Saint Botolph, Aldgate (Improvement) Act 1769 (repealed)	9 Geo. 3. c. 22	21 April 1769
An Act to amend and render more effectual an Act, passed in the Seventh Year of His present Majesty, intituled, "An Act for passing the Streets and other Places in that Part of the Parish of Saint Botolph Aldgate which lies in the County of Middlesex, and Part of a Street tailed East Smithfield, in the Precinct of Saint Catherine, and for cleansing, lighting, and watching, the same, and preventing Obstructions and Annoyances therein." (Note: Saint Botolph, Aldgate (Improvement) Act 1766 (7 Geo. 3. c. 85)) (Repealed by St. Botolph Aldgate and East Smithfield Improvement Act 1807 (47 Geo. 3 Sess. 2. c. xxxviii))
Saint Bartholomew the Great Parish (Improvement) Act 1769 (repealed)	9 Geo. 3. c. 23	21 April 1769
An Act to amend and render more effectual an Act of the Twenty-eighth of His late Majesty (Note: Saint Bartholomew the Great Parish, London (Improvement) Act 1755 (28 Geo. 2. c. 37)) for the better enlightening and cleansing the Open Places, Squares, Streets, Lanes, Alleys, Passages, and Courts, within the Parish of Saint Bartholomew the Great, London, and regulating the Nightly Watch and Beadles within the said Parish; and for empowering the Trustees in the said Act named to pave the said Streets and other Places within the said Parish, and to remove Annoyances and Obstructions. (Repealed by City of London Sewers Act 1851 (14 & 15 Vict. c. xci))
East India Company Act 1769 (repealed)	9 Geo. 3. c. 24	21 April 1769
An Act for carrying into Execution certain Proposals made by the East India Company for the Payment of the Annual Sum of Four hundred thousand Pounds, for a limited Time, in respect of the Territorial Acquisitions and Revenues lately obtained in the East Indies. (Repealed by Statute Law Revision Act 1867 (30 & 31 Vict. c. 59))
Coinage Duties Act 1769 (repealed)	9 Geo. 3. c. 25	21 April 1769
An Act for making perpetual an Act, made in the First Year of the Reign of His present Majesty, intituled, "An Act to continue the Duties for Encouragement of the Coinage of Money." (Note: Coinage Duties Act 1760 (1 Geo. 3. c. 16)) (Repealed by Statute Law Revision Act 1867 (30 & 31 Vict. c. 59))
Insolvent Debtors Relief Act 1769 (repealed)	9 Geo. 3. c. 26	21 April 1769
An Act for the Relief of Insolvent Debtors. (Repealed by Statute Law Revision Act 1867 (30 & 31 Vict. c. 59))
Colonial Trade Act 1769 (repealed)	9 Geo. 3. c. 27	1 May 1769
An Act to continue certain Laws, therein mentioned, for granting, for a limited Time, a Liberty to carry Rice from His Majesty's Provinces of South and North Carolina and Georgia, directly to any Part of America to the Southward of the said Provinces, subject to the like Duty as is now paid on the Exportation of Rice from the said Colonies to Places in Europe, situate to the Southward of Cape Finisterre. (Repealed by Statute Law Revision Act 1867 (30 & 31 Vict. c. 59))
Exportation, etc. Act 1769 (repealed)	9 Geo. 3. c. 28	1 May 1769
An Act to permit the Inhabitants of Jersey and Guernsey to export directly from thence to Newfoundland, or the British Colonies in America, Goods necessary for the Fishery, under certain Restrictions; and to import from thence non-enumerated Goods, (except Rum), and to land the same in the said Islands. (Repealed by Customs Law Repeal Act 1825 (6 Geo. 4. c. 105))
Malicious Injury Act 1769 (repealed)	9 Geo. 3. c. 29	1 May 1769
An Act for the more effectual Punishment of such Persons as shall demolish or pull down, burn, or otherwise destroy or spoil, any Mill or Mills; and for preventing the destroying or damaging of Engines for draining Collieries and Mines; or Bridges, Waggon Ways, or other Things, used in conveying Coals, Lead, Tin, or other Minerals, from Mines; or Fences for enclosing Lands, in pursuance of Acts of Parliament. (Repealed by Statute Law Revision Act 1887 (50 & 51 Vict. c. 59))
Navy Act 1769 (repealed)	9 Geo. 3. c. 30	1 May 1769
An Act for repealing so much of an Act, passed in the Tenth Year of Her late Majesty Queen Anne, (Note: Greenwich Hospital, etc. Act 1711 (10 Ann. c. 27)) as relates to the Harbour Moorings of the Royal Navy, and for the more effectual Preservation of such Harbour Moorings, and Punishment of Persons guilty of stealing or embezzling His Majesty's Naval Stores, or of Forgery or Perjury in relation to Seamen's Wages. (Repealed by Admiralty, &c. Acts Repeal Act 1865 (28 & 29 Vict. c. 112))
Magdalen Hospital Act 1769 or the Magdalen Hospital, London Act 1769 or the Magdalen Hospital Act 1768 (repealed)	9 Geo. 3. c. 31	1 May 1769
An Act for the establishing and well governing an Hospital for the Reception, Maintenance, and Employment, of Penitent Prostitutes; and for extinguishing the Right of Common of and in certain Lands in Saint George's Fields, in the County of Surry. (Repealed by Magdalen Hospital Amendment Act 1848 (11 & 12 Vict. c. xvii), Magdalen Hospital Charity Scheme Confirmation Act 1937 (1 Edw. 8 & 1 Geo. 6. c. xxiv) and Statute Law (Repeals) Act 2013 (c. 2))
Strood and Rochester (Improvement) Act 1769	9 Geo. 3. c. 32	1 May 1769
An Act for paving, cleansing, lighting, and watching, the High Streets and Lanes in the Parish of Saint Nicholas, within the City of Chester, and Parish of Strood, in the County of Kent; and for making a Road through Star Lane, across certain Fields adjoining thereto, to Chatham Hill, in the said County.
Supply, etc. Act 1769 (repealed)	9 Geo. 3. c. 33	9 May 1769
An Act for granting to His Majesty a certain Sum of Money to be raised by a Lottery. (Repealed by Statute Law Revision Act 1867 (30 & 31 Vict. c. 59))
Supply, etc. (No. 2) Act 1769 (repealed)	9 Geo. 3. c. 34	9 May 1769
An Act for granting to His Majesty a certain Sum of Money out of the Sinking Fund; and for applying a certain Sum, therein mentioned, for the Service of the Year One thousand seven hundred and sixty-nine; and for further appropriating the Supplies granted in this Session of Parliament. (Repealed by Statute Law Revision Act 1867 (30 & 31 Vict. c. 59))
Customs, etc. Act 1769 (repealed)	9 Geo. 3. c. 35	9 May 1769
An Act for discontinuing, upon the Exportation of Iron imported in Foreign Ships, the Draw-back of such Part of the Duties payable thereon as exceeds the Duties payable upon Iron imported in British Ships; to prohibit the Exportation of Pig and Bar Iron, and certain Naval Stores, unless the Preemption thereof be offered to the Commissioners of the Navy; to repeal so much of an Aft, made in the Sixth Year of His present Majesty's Reign, (Note: Bounty of Exportation Act 1766 (6 Geo. 3. c. 45)) as discontinued the Drawback upon Foreign Rough Hemp exported; for providing a Compensation to the Clerks in the Offices of the Principal Secretaries of State for the Advantages such Clerks enjoyed before the Commencement of an Act, made in the Fourth Year of the Reign of His present Majesty, (Note: Postage Act 1763 (4 Geo. 3. c. 24)) for preventing Frauds and Abuses in relation to the sending and receiving Letters and Packets free from the Duty of Postage, and to explain and amend the said Act. (Repealed by Statute Law Revision Act 1867 (30 & 31 Vict. c. 59))
Supply Act 1769 (repealed)	9 Geo. 3. c. 36	9 May 1769
An Act for applying certain Monies, therein mentioned, for the Service of the Year One thousand, seven hundred and sixty-nine. (Repealed by Statute Law Revision Act 1867 (30 & 31 Vict. c. 59))
Poor Relief Act 1769 (repealed)	9 Geo. 3. c. 37	9 May 1769
An Act for reviving several Acts for preventing Abuses in making Bricks and Tiles; and for indemnifying Justices of the Peace, and others, who have acted under the said Acts; and for indemnifying Persons who have omitted to make and file Affidavits; and for allowing further Time for paying Duties omitted to be paid upon Contracts with Clerks and Apprentices; for making forth Duplicates of Exchequer Bills, Lottery, Tickets, Certificates, Receipts, Annuity Orders; and other Orders, lost, burnt, or destroyed; and for repaying to Joseph Glover and John Bill, the Duty by them paid on a Cargo of Wheat, and for allowing the same to be landed for Home Consumption; and for preventing Parish Poor being paid in base or counterfeit Coin. (Repealed by Poor Law Act 1927 (17 & 18 Geo. 5. c. 14))
Silk Act 1769 (repealed)	9 Geo. 3. c. 38	9 May 1769
An Act for further encouraging the Growth and Culture of Raw Silk in His Majesty's Colonies or Plantations in America. (Repealed by Statute Law Revision Act 1867 (30 & 31 Vict. c. 59))
Hides and Skins Act 1769 (repealed)	9 Geo. 3. c. 39	9 May 1769
An Act to permit the free Importation of certain Raw Hides and Skins from Ireland, and the British Plantations in America, for a limited Time; and for taking off the Duties upon Seal Skins tanned or tawed in this Kingdom, and for granting another Duty in Lieu thereof; for indemnifying all Persons with respect to advising or executing any of His Majesty's Orders of Council prohibiting the Importation of Raw Hides, Horns, and Hoots, of infected Cattle; and to authorize the Prohibition of the Importation of such Hides, Horns, and Hoofs, for the sutuie. (Repealed by Statute Law Revision Act 1867 (30 & 31 Vict. c. 59))
Militia Pay Act 1769 (repealed)	9 Geo. 3. c. 40	9 May 1769
An Act for defraying the Charge of the Pay and Cloathing of the Militia, in that Part of Great Britain called England, for One Year, beginning the Twenty-fifth Day of March One thousand seven hundred and sixty-nine. (Repealed by Statute Law Revision Act 1867 (30 & 31 Vict. c. 59))
Customs, etc. (No. 2) Act 1769 (repealed)	9 Geo. 3. c. 41	9 May 1769
An Act for better securing the Duties of Customs upon certain Goods removed from the Out Ports and other Places to London; for regulating the Fees of the Officers of His Majesty's Customs in the Province of Senegambia in Africa; for allowing to the Receivers General of the Duties on Offices and Employments in Scotland, a proper Compensation for their Trouble and Expenses; for the better Preservation of Hollies, Thorns, and Quicksets, in Forests, Chaces, and Private Grounds, and of Trees and Underwoods in Forests and Chaces; and for authorizing the Exportation of a limited Quantity of an inferior Sort of Barley called Bigg, from the Port of Kirkwall, in the Islands of Orkney. (Repealed by Statute Law Revision Act 1867 (30 & 31 Vict. c. 59))
Militia Act 1769 (repealed)	9 Geo. 3. c. 42	9 May 1769
An Act for explaining, amending, and continuing, an Act, made in the second Year of the Reign of His present Majesty, intituled, "An Act to explain, amend, and reduce into One Act of Parliament, the several Laws now in being, relating to the raising and training the Militia, within that Part of Great Britain called England." (Note: Militia Act 1762 (2 Geo. 3. c. 20)) (Repealed by Statute Law Revision Act 1867 (30 & 31 Vict. c. 59))
Kent Roads Act 1769 (repealed)	9 Geo. 3. c. 43	20 December 1768
An Act for repairing and widening the Roads from the Turnpike Road at Golford Green, in the Parish of Cranbrooke, to the Turnpike Road in the Parish of Sandhurst, and from the Green near Benenden Church to the Bull Inn at Rolvenden Cross, in the County of Kent. (Repealed by Cranbrook and Sandhurst, and Benenden and Rolvenden Cross Roads Act 1833 (3 & 4 Will. 4. c. xxviii))
Taunton (Improvements) Act 1769 (repealed)	9 Geo. 3. c. 44	20 December 1768
An Act for erecting a Market-house, and holding a Market, in the Town of Taunton, in the County of Somerset, and for preventing the holding of any Market in the Streets of the said Town, and for cleansing the Streets and preventing Nuisances and Obstructions therein, and for lighting certain Streets in the said Town. (Repealed by Taunton Corporation Act 1931 (21 & 22 Geo. 5. c. cii))
Flint Roads Act 1769 (repealed)	9 Geo. 3. c. 45	21 March 1769
An Act for repairing the Road from the Turnpike Gate in the Township of Greenfield, to the North Limits of the Township of Mostyn, and from Mostyn to Henllan, and from Llanerch y Mor to Pen y Fordd wain, in the Counties of Flint and Denbigh. (Repealed by St. Asaph and Conway Roads Act 1812 (52 Geo. 3. c. xxviii), Roads in Flintshire and Denbighshire Act 1812 (52 Geo. 3. c. cxvii), Flint, Holywell and Mostyn Districts of Road Act 1833 (3 & 4 Will. 4. c. xxv) and Road from Pant Evan Brook to Abergele Act 1833 (3 & 4 Will. 4. c. xxvi))
Denbigh and Flint Roads Act 1769 (repealed)	9 Geo. 3. c. 46	21 March 1769
An Act for repairing the Road from the Town of Denbigh, to the Turnpike Road between Northop and Holywell, and from Avon Wen to the Town of Mold, in the Counties of Denbigh and Flint. (Repealed by Denbigh and Mold Road and Branch Act 1833 (3 & 4 Will. 4. c. xxvii))
Dorset Roads Act 1769 (repealed)	9 Geo. 3. c. 47	21 March 1769
An Act for amending, widening, altering, clearing, and keeping in Repair, several Roads leading from the Borough of Dorchester, in the County of Dorset; and for repealing so much of an Act, passed in the Sixth Year of His present Majesty's Reign, (Note: Wareham and Purbeck Roads Act 1766 (6 Geo. 3. c. 92)) as relates to the repairing the Road leading from Wool to the said Borough. (Repealed by Wool Bridge and Dorchester Road Act 1830 (11 Geo. 4 & 1 Will. 4. c. xxiv))
Wilts Roads Act 1769 (repealed)	9 Geo. 3. c. 48	21 March 1769
An Act to enlarge the Term and Powers of an Act, passed in the Sixteenth Year of King George the Second, (Note: Wiltshire Roads Act 1742 (16 Geo. 2. c. 10)) for repairing the Roads from Marlborough to Shepherd's Shord, and from Beckhampton to the Top of Cherill Hill, and from Avebury to Beckhampton, in the County of Wilts; and for repairing and widening the Road from the Turnpike Gate at Avebury to Wroughton, and from the North Side of Swindon to The Carpenters Arms in Blunsden, in the said County. (Repealed by Wiltshire Roads Act 1790 (30 Geo. 3. c. 96))
Kent Roads (No. 2) Act 1769	9 Geo. 3. c. 49	21 March 1769
An Act for repairing and widening the Road leading from Mereworth Croft, to the Road leading from Seal to Wrotham Heath; and also the said Road from opposite the House of William Dalison Esquire to Hadlow Street, in the County of Kent.
Gloucester and Hereford Roads Act 1769 (repealed)	9 Geo. 3. c. 50	21 March 1769
An Act for enlarge the Term and Powers of an Act, made in the Thirty-third Year of King George the Second, (Note: Gloucester and Hereford Roads Act 1759 (33 Geo. 2. c. 34)) for repairing and widening the Road from Gloucester towards Hereford, and other Roads therein mentioned; and for amending several other Roads near or adjoining to some of the said Roads. (Repealed by Roads from Newent Act 1824 (5 Geo. 4. c. xi), Roads from Gloucester City Act 1833 (3 & 4 Will. 4. c. lv) and Roads through Huntley from Gloucester Act 1833 (3 & 4 Will. 4. c. lxxv))
Essex and Herts Roads Act 1769 (repealed)	9 Geo. 3. c. 51	21 March 1769
An Act for enlarging the Term and Powers granted by an Act, passed in the Seventeenth Year of the Reign of His late Majesty, (Note: Essex and Hertfordshire Roads Act 1743 (17 Geo. 2. c. 9)) for repairing and widening the Road leading from a Place called Harlow Bush Common, (Note: Harlow, Essex.) in the Parish of Harlow, in the County of Essex, to Stump Croft, in the Parish of Great Chesterford, in the said County. (Repealed by Road from Harlow Bush Common to Stump Cross Act 1829 (10 Geo. 4. c. xxi))
Buckingham to Hanwell Road Act 1769 (repealed)	9 Geo. 3. c. 52	21 March 1769
An Act to continue the Term, and enlarge the Powers, of so much of an Act, made in the Seventeenth Year of the Reign of His late Majesty, (Note: Buckingham to Warmington Road Act 1743 (17 Geo. 2. c. 43)) as relates to the Road from the Town of Buckingham, in the County of Bucks, to the North Extent of the Parish of Hanwell, in the County of Oxford, leading towards Warmington Gate. (Repealed by Buckingham to Hanwell Road Act 1811 (51 Geo. 3. c. ii))
Birmingham Canal Navigation Act 1769 or the Birmingham Canal Act 1769 (repealed)	9 Geo. 3. c. 53	21 March 1769
An Act to rectify a Mistake in an Act, passed in the Eighth Year of His present Majesty, intituled, "An Act for making and maintaining a navigable Cut or Canal from Birmingham to Bilstone, and from thence to Autherley, there to communicate with the Canal now making between the Rivers Severn and Trent; and for making collateral Cuts up to several Coal Mines;" (Note: Birmingham Canal Navigation Act 1768 (8 Geo. 3. c. 38)) and to explain and amend the said Act. (Repealed by Birmingham Canal Navigations Act 1835 (5 & 6 Will. 4. c. xxxiv))
Yorkshire Roads Act 1769 (repealed)	9 Geo. 3. c. 54	21 March 1769
An Act for enlarging the Term and Powers of an Act, made in the Twenty-fifth Year of His late Majesty, (Note: Yorkshire Roads Act 1751 (25 Geo. 2. c. 47)) for repairing and widening the Roads from the East End of Monk Bridge, (Note: Monk Bridge takes the A1036 road across the River Foss to the east of York city centre. 53°57′55″N 1°04′28″W) near the Suburbs of the City of York to New Malton, and from thence to Scarborough, in the North Riding of the County of York; and also from Spittlehouse, in the East Riding of the said County, to Scarborough aforesaid. (Repealed by York and Scarborough Roads Act 1798 (38 Geo. 3. c. xxxvii))
Salop Roads Act 1769 (repealed)	9 Geo. 3. c. 55	23 March 1769
An Act for repairing and widening the Road from the End of the Turnpike Road in Shawbury, in the County of Salop, to Drayton in Hales, in the said County, and from thence to Newcastle under Line, in the County of Stafford; and from Shawbury aforesaid to the Turnpike Road in High Ercall, in the said County of Salop; and from Shawbury aforesaid to Wem, in the said County, and from thence to the Turnpike Road in Sandford, in the said County. (Repealed by Road from Newcastle-under-Lyme to Market Drayton Act 1832 (2 & 3 Will. 4. c. lv) and Shawbury District of Roads (Salop.) Act 1832 (2 & 3 Will. 4. c. lxxv))
Merioneth Roads Act 1769 (repealed)	9 Geo. 3. c. 56	23 March 1769
An Act for repairing and widening several Roads in the Counties of Montgomery, Merioneth, and Salop. (Repealed by Roads in Montgomery, Merioneth and Salop Act 1813 (53 Geo. 3. c. clxxxvi))
Montrose Beer Duties Act 1769 (repealed)	9 Geo. 3. c. 57	21 March 1769
An Act for continuing Two Acts, made in the Sixth Year of King George the First, (Note: Montrose Beer Duties Act 1719 (6 Geo. 1. c. 7)) and in the Seventh Year of His late Majesty, (Note: Montrose Beer Duties Act 1733 (7 Geo. 2. c. 5)) for laying a Duty of Two Pennies Scots, or One Sixth Part of a Penny Sterling, upon every Pint of Ale or Beer that shall be vended or sold within the Town of Montrose and Privileges thereof, for supplying the said Town with Fresh Water; and for other Purposes therein mentioned. (Repealed by Statute Law Revision Act 1948 (11 & 12 Geo. 6. c. 62))
Gloucestershire Roads Act 1769 (repealed)	9 Geo. 3. c. 58	21 March 1769
An Act for repairing the Road from the Town of Cirencester, in the County of Gloucester, to the Tenth Mile Stone from Cirencester, at or near the East End of the Town of Tetbury, and from the West End of the Church Yard in the said Town of Tetbury, to a Gate in the said County, near the Monument upon Lansdown. (Repealed by Gloucestershire Roads Act 1783 (23 Geo. 3. c. 106))
Doveridge Roads, Derby Act 1769	9 Geo. 3. c. 59	21 March 1769
An Act to empower the Right Honourable Sir Henry Cavendish Baronet, to shut up certain Roads, and a Foot Path, in the Parish of Doveridge, in the County of Derby, and to oblige him to make and keep in Repair, for the future, a new Road and Foot Path in Lieu thereof.
Manchester Church Act 1769	9 Geo. 3. c. 60	21 March 1769
An Act to enable Edward Byrom Esquire to complete a Building intended for a new Church in the Town of Manchester, and for making the same a perpetual Cure and Benefice, and for other Purposes.
St. Nicholas Church, Bristol Act 1769	9 Geo. 3. c. 61	23 March 1769
An Act for raising Money to discharge Debts contracted for rebuilding the Parish Church and Tower of Saint Nicholas, in the City of Bristol, and to rebuild the Spire and complete the said Church; and for other Purposes.
Nottingham (Shire Hall) Act 1769 (repealed)	9 Geo. 3. c. 62	23 March 1769
An Act to rebuild the Shire-Hall of the County of Nottingham, and for using the Guild-Hall of the Town and County of the Town of Nottingham, for the Purposes of a Shire-Hall, in the mean Time. (Repealed by Statute Law (Repeals) Act 1995 (c. 44))
Epping and Ongar Road Act 1769 (repealed)	9 Geo. 3. c. 63	23 March 1769
An Act to enlarge the Term and Powers of Two Acts, passed in the Tenth Year of King George the First, (Note: Essex Roads Act 1723 (10 Geo. 1. c. 9)) and the Sixteenth Year of His late Majesty, (Note: Epping and Ongar Road Act 1742 (16 Geo. 2. c. 19)) for repairing the Road from the North Part of Harlow Bush Common, in the Parish of Harlow, to Woodford, (Note: Woodford, now in Greater London, historically in Essex.) in the County of Essex. (Repealed by Road from Harlow Act 1822 (3 Geo. 4. c. xliv))
Hertford and Bedford Roads Act 1769 (repealed)	9 Geo. 3. c. 64	23 March 1769
An Act to continue and render more effectual several Acts, passed in the Sixth (Note: Stevenage and Biggleswade Road Act 1719 (6 Geo. 1. c. 25)) and Twelfth (Note: Hertfordshire Roads Act 1725 (12 Geo. 1. c. 10)) Years of King George the First, and the Twenty-eighth Year of His late Majesty, (Note: Stevenage and Biggleswade Road Act 1755 (28 Geo. 2. c. 30)) for repairing the Roads from Stevenage, in the County of Hertford, to Biggleswade, in the County of Bedford, and other Roads therein mentioned; and for repairing and widening the Road from Radwell Corner to the Turnpike Road at Arlesey, in the County of Bedford. (Repealed by Stevenage, Biggleswade and Arsley Road Act 1832 (2 & 3 Will. 4. c. lxxvi))
Macclesfield and Nether Tabley Road Act 1769 (repealed)	9 Geo. 3. c. 65	23 March 1769
An Act to repair and widen the Road from the Broken Cross in Macclesfield, in the County of Chester, over the Long Mots and Monks Heath to the Turnpike Road in Nether Tabley, in the said County; and for turning and exchanging Part of the said Road. (Repealed by Road from Macclesfield to Nether Tabley Act 1831 (1 Will. 4. c. xv))
Norwich to Scole Bridge Road Act 1769 (repealed)	9 Geo. 3. c. 66	23 March 1769
An Act for repairing and widening the Road from the City of Norwich to Scole Bridge, in the County of Norfolk. (Repealed by Norwich and Scole Bridge Road Act 1826 (7 Geo. 4. c. xxvii))
Scole Bridge to Bury St. Edmunds Road Act 1769 (repealed)	9 Geo. 3. c. 67	23 March 1769
An Act for repairing and widening the Road from Scole Bridge to the Place where the East Gate lately flood in the Town of Bury Saint Edmunds, in the County of Suffolk. (Repealed by Scole Bridge and Bury St. Edmunds Road Act 1828 (9 Geo. 4. c. lxxv))
Norwich to Yarmouth Road Act 1769 (repealed)	9 Geo. 3. c. 68	23 March 1769
An Act for amending the Road from Bishops-gate Bridge in the City of Norwich, to a Stone formerly called The Two Mile Stone, where the Norwich Road joins the Caister Causeway, Two Miles and a Half short of the Town of Great Yarmouth. (Repealed by Norwich and Great Yarmouth Road Act 1813 (53 Geo. 3. c. cxxx) (Note: Incorrectly cited as "1813 c cxxviii" in the Chronological Table of the Statutes.) and Road from Norwich to the Caister Causeway Act 1831 (1 Will. 4. c. lxv))
Bodmin Roads Act 1769 (repealed)	9 Geo. 3. c. 69	23 March 1769
An Act for repairing and widening several Roads, leading to and through the Borough of Bodmin, in the County of Cornwall. (Repealed by Bodmin Roads Act 1829 (10 Geo. 4. c. xix))
Oxford Canal Act 1769 or the Coventry to Oxford Canal Act 1769 (repealed)	9 Geo. 3. c. 70	21 April 1769
An Act for making and maintaining a navigable Canal from the Coventry Canal Navigation to the City of Oxford. (Repealed by Oxford Canal Act 1808 (48 Geo. 3. c. iii) and Oxford Canal Navigation Act 1829 (10 Geo. 4. c. xlviii))
Calder and Hebble Navigation Act 1769	9 Geo. 3. c. 71	21 April 1769
An Act for extending the Navigation of the River Calder to Salter Hebble Bridge, and to Sower by Bridge, in the county of York, and for repealing an Act for that Purpose.
Queen's College, Oxford Act 1769	9 Geo. 3. c. 72	21 April 1769
An Act for the better Establishment of the Foundation of John, Michel Esquire, in the Queen's College in the University of Oxford; and for other the Purposes therein mentioned.
Wilts Roads (No. 2) Act 1769	9 Geo. 3. c. 73	21 April 1769
An Act to enlarge the Term and Powers of an Act, passed in the Thirty-first Year of His late Majesty, (Note: Wilts Roads Act 1757 (31 Geo. 2. c. 68)) for amending the Road from Pengate to Latchett's Bridge, and other Roads, in the County of Wilts, and for amending several Roads near adjoining to the said Roads.
Haddington Roads Act 1769 (repealed)	9 Geo. 3. c. 74	21 April 1769
An Act for enlarging the Term and Powers, granted by an Act of the Twenty-third Year of His late Majesty, (Note: Haddington County Roads Act 1749 (23 Geo. 2. c. 17)) for repairing the Roads from Dunglass Bridge to the Town of Haddingtoun, and from thence to Ravenshaughburn, in the County of Haddingtoun. (Repealed by Haddington Roads Act 1811 (51 Geo. 3. c. cxxvii) and Haddingtonshire Roads Act 1833 (3 & 4 Will. 4. c. cix))
Yorkshire Roads (No. 2) Act 1769 (repealed)	9 Geo. 3. c. 75	21 April 1769
An Act for continuing and rendering more effectual an Act (Note: Westmorland Roads Act 1742 (16 Geo. 2. c. 3)) for repairing the Road from Bowes, in the County of York, to Brough under Stainmore, in the County of Westmorland and for repairing and widening the Road from Maiden Castle to Kaber Cross; and Also the Road from Maiden Castle to the Coal Works at Taylor Rig, and to Tan Hill and King's Pitts; and Also the Road from Barrow's Brow to Middle Fell Dyke Nook, in the said Counties; and Also from Tan Hill and King's Pitts to Beck Crooks, and Punchott Pasture West Gate to Whaw Lane Head, and by Lilly Jocks to Reeth. (Repealed by Roads from Bowes and from Maiden Castle Act 1813 (53 Geo. 3. c. clxxxvii) and Annual Turnpike Acts Continuance Act 1867 (30 & 31 Vict. c. 121))
Kent Roads (No. 3) Act 1769 (repealed)	9 Geo. 3. c. 76	21 April 1769
An Act to repeal so much of an Act, passed in the Second Year of His present Majesty, (Note: Kent Roads Act 1762 (2 Geo. 3. c. 65)) for repairing and widening the Roads from the White Post on Haselden's Wood, in the Parish of Cranbrooke to Appledore Heathy and other Roads in the, County of Kent, as relates to the Road front Goldford Green to Tanner's Vent; for enlarging the Term and Powers of the said Act with respect to the other Roads therein contained; and for amending, the Road from the Turnpike Road, in the tariffs of Tenterden, through Rolvenden, to the Turnpike Road in the Parish of Newenden, in the said County. (Repealed by Road from Cranbrooke to Appledore Heath and Branches (Kent) Act 1829 (10 Geo. 4. c. lxxxviii))
Carnarvon Roads Act 1769 (repealed)	9 Geo. 3. c. 77	21 April 1769
An Act for repairing and widening the Road leading from Tal y Cafn Ferry, (Note: The ferry across the River Conwy at Tal-y-Cafn was replaced by a bridge in 1897. 53°13′45″N 3°49′19″W) in the County of Carnarvon, and through the Towns of Conway, Bangor, and Carnarvon, to the Town of Pellhely, in the same County. (Repealed by Conway and Pwllheli Road Act 1832 (2 & 3 Will. 4. c. lx))
Maidstone to Key Street Road Act 1769 (repealed)	9 Geo. 3. c. 78	21 April 1769
An Act for repairing and widening the Road from Maidstone, through Debtling, to Key Street, in the Parishes of Borden and Bobbing, in the County of Kent. (Repealed by Road from Maidstone to Key Street Act 1829 (10 Geo. 4. c. xxiv))
Beverley to Hessle Ferry Turnpike Act 1769 (repealed)	9 Geo. 3. c. 79	21 April 1769
An Act for repairing and widening the Road (Note: Beverley Road/Hull Road.) from Beverley (Note: Beverley, East Riding of Yorkshire.) to the Ferry at Hessle, (Note: There was a ferry across the Humber Estuary from Hessle to Barton Waterside, Barton-upon-Humber. 53°43′01″N 0°26′04″W) and from the Malton Guide Post (Note: The Malton Guide Post was at Norwoods on the Beverley Road. 53°47′50″N 0°27′05″W) to the Gravel Pit at Cottingham, (Note: Cottingham, East Riding of Yorkshire.) in the County of York. (Repealed by Beverley, Hessle and North Cave Turnpike Roads (Yorkshire) Act 1832 (2 & 3 Will. 4. c. cix))
Cheadle to Butterton Moor Road Act 1769 (repealed)	9 Geo. 3. c. 80	21 April 1769
An Act for repairing and widening the Road from Cheadle (Note: Cheadle, Staffordshire.) to Botham House, (Note: Bottomhouse, Staffordshire. 53°04′19″N 1°56′23″W) and from thence to Butterton Moor End, (Note: Near Butterton, Staffordshire.) in the County of Stafford. (Repealed by Cheadle to Butterton Moor Road Act 1810 (50 Geo. 3. c. civ) and Roads in the Neighbourhood of Cheadle Act 1831 (1 Will. 4. c. lxviii))
Darley Moor and Ellaston Road Act 1769 (repealed)	9 Geo. 3. c. 81	21 April 1769
An Act for repairing and widening the Road from Darly Moor, (Note: Darley Moor, on the A515 road, south of Ashbourne, Derbyshire. 52°58′10″N 1°45′11″W) in the County of Derby, to Ellaston, (Note: Ellastone, Staffordshire.) in the County of Stafford, and from thence to the Turnpike Road (Note: The A523 road between Leek, Staffordshire, and Ashbourne, Derbyshire. 53°03′55″N 1°55′15″W) between Leek and Ashborne, in the said Counties of Derby and Stafford. (Repealed by Darly Moor and Ellaston Road (Derbyshire) Act 1833 (3 & 4 Will. 4. c. vii))
Devonshire (Poor Relief) Act 1769 (repealed)	9 Geo. 3. c. 82	1 May 1769
An Act for the more effectual Relief of the Poor in the County of Devon. (Repealed by Devon (Poor Relief) Act 1772 (13 Geo. 3. c. 18))
Birmingham Improvement Act 1769 (repealed)	9 Geo. 3. c. 83	1 May 1769
An Act for laying open and widening certain Ways and Passages within the Town of Birmingham, and for cleansing and lighting the Streets, Lanes, Ways, and Passages there, and for removing and preventing Nuisances and Obstructions therein. (Repealed by Birmingham Improvement Act 1812 (52 Geo. 3. c. cxiii))
Worcester Bridge Act 1769 (repealed)	9 Geo. 3. c. 84	1 May 1769
An Act for building a Bridge at Worcester over the River Severn, and for opening convenient Avenues to the said Bridge. (Repealed by Statute Law (Repeals) Act 1998 (c. 43))
Stoke Damerell Church, Devon Act 1769	9 Geo. 3. c. 85	1 May 1769
An Act for building a Chapel at Plymouth Dock, in the Parish of Stoke Damerell, in the County of Devon.
Hertford and Cambridge Roads Act 1769	9 Geo. 3. c. 86	1 May 1769
An Act for repairing the Roads leading from the Turnpike Road in Tring, in the County of Hertford, through Dunstable, Hitchin, Baldick, and Royston, to the Turnpike Road at or near Bourn Bridge, and from the West End of Wellbury Lane to the Turnpike Road at the South End of Barton, in the Counties of Hertford, Bucks, Bedford, and Cambridge.
Hertford and Bedford Roads (No. 2) Act 1769 (repealed)	9 Geo. 3. c. 87	1 May 1769
An Act to continue and render more effectual an Act, passed in the Thirtieth Year of His late Majesty, (Note: Hertford and Bedford Roads Act 1757 (30 Geo. 2. c. 43)) for repairing the Road from Hitchin, in the County of Hertford, through Shefford, to the Turnpike Road from Saint Albans to Bedford, and other Roads therein mentioned; and for repairing and widening the Road from Shefford Way Post to the Turnpike Road at Henlow, in the County of Bedford. (Repealed by Hitchin and Bedford Roads and Branches Act 1813 (53 Geo. 3. c. xciii) and Hitchin, Shefford, Henlow and Gorford Bridge Roads Act 1835 (5 & 6 Will. 4. c. xxxix))
Bucks and Oxford Roads Act 1769	9 Geo. 3. c. 88	1 May 1769
An Act for repairing the Road from Stoney Stratford, in the County of Bucks, through the Towns of Buckingham and Bicester, to the Town of Woodstock, in the County of Oxford.
South London Roads Act 1769	9 Geo. 3. c. 89	1 May 1769
An Act for making a Road (Note: From 1769 until 1829 the northern part of the road was known as Great Surrey Street, but it was then renamed to Blackfriars Road; the southern part is London Road. It is now part of the A201 road.) from the South End of Blackfriars Bridge (Note: The south end of Blackfriars Bridge is in Southwark, London. 51°30′31″N 0°06′16″W) to the present Turnpike Road cross Saint George's Fields, (Note: The road crossed the earlier road from Westminster Bridge across St George's Fields at St George's Circus. 51°29′55″N 0°06′18″W) and from thence to some Place at or near the House called The Dog and Duck, (Note: Dog and Duck, St George's Fields. 51°29′44″N 0°6′31″W) and to Newington Butts, (Note: Newington Butts was a hamlet. 51°29′36″N 0°06′02″W) in the County of Surry; and for empowering the Trustees for carrying into Execution an Act, passed in the Twenty-fourth Year of the Reign of His late Majesty, (Note: Southwark Roads Act 1750 (24 Geo. 2. c. 58)) to repair, light, and watch the said Roads when made.
Hereford Roads Act 1769 (repealed)	9 Geo. 3. c. 90	1 May 1769
An Act for enlarging the Term and Powers of Two Acts, passed in the Third (Note: Hereford Roads Act 1729 (3 Geo. 2. c. 18)) and Twenty-second (Note: Hereford Roads Act 1748 (22 Geo. 2. c. 18)) Years of His late Majesty, for repairing the several Roads leading into the City of Hereford; and for amending the Roads to Lancloudy Hill and Langua Bridge. (Repealed by Hereford Roads Act 1810 (50 Geo. 3. c. lxxiii))
Leicester Roads Act 1769 (repealed)	9 Geo. 3. c. 91	1 May 1769
An Act to explain, amend, and render more effectual an Act, passed in the Twenty-seventh Year of King George the Second, (Note: Leicester and Warwick Roads Act 1754 (27 Geo. 2. c. 42)) for repairing and widening the Road from Leicester to Narborough, and from Leicester to Coventry, and from thence, through Kenilworth (Note: Kenilworth, Warwickshire. 52°21′00″N 1°34′52″W) to Warwick, (Note: Warwick, Warwickshire. 52°17′01″N 1°34′50″W) and other Roads, and for other Purposes in the said Act mentioned, so far as the same relates to the Road from the Borough of Leicester to the Town of Narborough, and from Leicester to Hinckley in the County of Leicester. (Repealed by Leicester and Narborough and Hinckley Roads Act 1800 (39 & 40 Geo. 3. c. iii))
Kent Roads (No. 5) Act 1769 (repealed)	9 Geo. 3. c. 92	1 May 1769
An Act to amend an Act of the Fifth Year of His present Majesty's Reign, (Note: Kent Roads (No. 2) Act 1765 (5 Geo. 3. c. 71)) for repairing and widening the Road from Tonbridge to Maidstone, and from Wat's Cross to Cowden, in the County of Kent, so far as the same relates to the Repair of the Road from Wat's Cross to Cowden; and for repairing the Roads leading from Sevenoaks Common to Crockhust Batch-Corner; and from Penshurst Town to Southborough, in the said County. (Repealed by Roads from Watts Cross and from Sevenoaks Common Act 1828 (9 Geo. 4. c. cviii))
Exeter Roads Act 1769 (repealed)	9 Geo. 3. c. 93	1 May 1769
An Act to continue and render more effectual Two Acts (Note: Exeter Roads Act 1753 (26 Geo. 2. c. 74)) (Note: Exeter Roads Act 1756 (29 Geo. 2. c. 55)) for amending several Roads leading from the City of Exeter, and for repairing and widening several other Roads therein mentioned; and for rebuilding or repairing Exe Bridge, and making the Avenues leading thereto more commodious; and for building a Bridge over the River Exe at or near Countess Wear, in the County of Devon. (Repealed by Exeter Roads, etc. Act 1773 (13 Geo. 3. c. 109))
Stafford and Chester Roads Act 1769 (repealed)	9 Geo. 3. c. 94	1 May 1769
An Act for repealing so much of Two several Acts of Parliament, made and passed in the Seventeenth (Note: Litchfield Roads Act 1743 (17 Geo. 2. c. 24)) and Twenty-eighth (Note: Litchfield and Chester Roads Act 1755 (28 Geo. 2. c. 52)) Years of the Reign of His late Majesty King George the Second, as relate to the Road from the End of the County of Stafford, in the Post Road, towards the City of Chester, (Note: Chester, Cheshire.) through Woor (Note: Woore, Shropshire.) in the County of Salop, to Nantwich (Note: Nantwich, Cheshire.) in the County of Chester, and from Nantwich to Tarporley, (Note: Tarporley, Cheshire.) and from thence, through Tarvin (Note: Tarvin, Cheshire.) in the said County of Chester, to the said City of Chester; and for more effectually repairing, widening, and supporting the same Road; and also for repairing and widening the Road from Northwich, in the said County of Chester, to the Cross in Tarvin aforesaid. (Repealed by Stafford and Clotton Road Act 1824 (5 Geo. 4. c. xxxvi), Road from Northwich to Kelsall Hill (Cheshire) Act 1828 (9 Geo. 4. c. cv) and Chester, Tarvin, Delamere and Duddan Smithy Road Act 1829 (10 Geo. 4. c. xxv))
Bathwick Roads and Bridge, etc. Act 1769	9 Geo. 3. c. 95	9 May 1769
An Act to empower the Trustees of the Will of the late General Pulteney, and other Trustees appointed by this Act, to purchase and exchange Lands and Grounds in the Manor of Bathwick, in the County of Somerset, for the Purpose of making certain Roads and Ways to and from a free Bridge by them intended to be built over the River Avon, in the said County; and also to empower the Persons in Possession of the said Estate, for the Time being, under the said Will, to grant Leases of certain Lands and Houses in the said Manor; and likewise to enable the said Trustees to grant certain Grounds and Springs of Water within the said Manor of Bathwick, to the Mayor, Aldermen, and Citizens of Bath, and for extending the Jurisdiction of the said Mayor, Aldermen, and Citizens, over Part of the said Manor of Bathwick; and for other Purposes therein mentioned.

=== Private acts ===
Short title	Citation	Royal assent
Long title
Dufaur's Naturalization Act 1769	9 Geo. 3. c. 1 Pr.	25 November 1768
An Act for naturalizing John Dufaur.
Stonely Inclosure Act 1769	9 Geo. 3. c. 2 Pr.	20 December 1768
An Act for dividing and enclosing the Common Fields and Common Meadow Grounds in the Township of Stoneley, in the Parish and Manor of Kimbolton, in the County of Huntingdon.
Willey Inclosure Act 1769	9 Geo. 3. c. 3 Pr.	20 December 1768
An Act for dividing and enclosing the Open Common Fields, Commonable Lands, Common, Arable, Meadow, Pasture, and Waste Grounds, within the Parish of Willey, in the County of Warwick
Greening's Name Act 1769	9 Geo. 3. c. 4 Pr.	20 December 1768
An Act to enable Henry Thomas Greening Esquire to take and use the Surname of Gott, pursuant to the Will of Mary Gott deceased.
Madrass' Naturalization Act 1769	9 Geo. 3. c. 5 Pr.	20 December 1768
An Act for naturalizing George Madrass.
Schneider's Naturalization Act 1769	9 Geo. 3. c. 6 Pr.	20 December 1768
An Act for naturalizing John Henry Schneider.
Niedrick's Naturalization Act 1769	9 Geo. 3. c. 7 Pr.	20 December 1768
An Act for naturalizing Paul Niedrick.
Farrington's Estate Act 1769	9 Geo. 3. c. 8 Pr.	21 March 1769
An Act for vesting certain Lands in the Parish of Chislehurst in the County of Kent, devised by the Will of Thomas Farrington Esquire deceased, in Trustees, to convey the same to Charles Lord Camden, and for settling Lands to be taken in Exchange, and for laying out Money arising by Sale thereof in other Lands, Tenements, and Hereditaments, to be conveyed to the same Uses.
Confirming articles of agreement and effecting an exchange of lands between George Duke of Marlborough and Merton College, Oxford.	9 Geo. 3. c. 9 Pr.	21 March 1769
An Act for confirming Articles of Agreement, and for effecting an Exchange of Lands between the Most Noble George Duke of Marlborough, and the Warden and Scholars of Merton College, in Oxford.
Appointing jointures for wives and portions for children of Willoughby Earl of Abingdon and Peregrine Bertie, his brother.	9 Geo. 3. c. 10 Pr.	21 March 1769
An Act for appointing Jointures for the Wives, and providing Portions for the younger Children, of the Right Honourable Willoughby Earl of Abingdon, and the Honourable Peregrine Bertie his Brother, and for other the Purposes therein mentioned.
Wynn's Estate Act 1769	9 Geo. 3. c. 11 Pr.	21 March 1769
An Act for enable Sir Watkin Williams Wynn Baronet, a Minor, to make a Settlement on his intended Marriage with the Lady Henrietta Somerset.
Graham's Estate Act 1769	9 Geo. 3. c. 12 Pr.	21 March 1769
An Act for discharging divers Messuages, Lands, and Hereditaments, Part of the Estate of Sir Bellingham Graham Baronet, in the County of York, from the Uses and Trusts limited and declared by the Will of the Honourable Mary Graham deceased, and for settling other Lands and Hereditaments, other Part of the Estate of the said Sir Bellingham Graham, in the said County, of greater Value, in Lieu thereof, to the like Uses.
Garth's Estate Act 1769	9 Geo. 3. c. 13 Pr.	21 March 1769
An Act to empower Richard Garth Esquire to make Leases of his Settled Estates in the County of Surry for building upon and improving the same.
Sparhauke's Estate Act 1769	9 Geo. 3. c. 14 Pr.	21 March 1769
An Act for vesting certain Messuages, Lands and Hereditaments, in Baldock, in the County of Hertford, devised by the Will of Edward Sparhawke Gentleman, deceased, in Lawndey Sparhawke Esquire, and his Heirs, discharged from the Uses of the said Will; and for substituting and settling an undivided Moiety of other Lands and Hereditaments, in Hertfordshire, in lieu thereof, and to the like Uses.
Lloyd's Estate Act 1769	9 Geo. 3. c. 15 Pr.	21 March 1769
An Act for vesting Part of the Settled Estate of the Reverend William Lloyd Clerk, in Trustees, for railing Money to discharge the Debts, Legacies, and Incumbrances, affecting the same, and for other Purposes therein mentioned.
Confirming a partition between John Edwards, John and Frances Freemantle and Mary Edwards, of estates in Middlesex and Bristol, devised by John Schoppens' will and of the residue of his personal estate.	9 Geo. 3. c. 16 Pr.	21 March 1769
An Act for confirming a Partition between John Edwards Esquire, John Freemantle Esquire, and Frances his Wife, and Mary Edwards Spinster, of several Estates in the County of Middlesex and City of Bristol, devised by the Will of John Schoppens Esquire deceased, and of the Residue of the Personal Estate of the said John Schoppens.
Enabling Charles Biddulph and sons to grant leases on certain lands and properties in Surrey, Sussex and Staffordshire of which they are tenants for life successively.	9 Geo. 3. c. 17 Pr.	21 March 1769
An Act to enable Charles Biddulph Esquire, and his Three Infant Sons, John Biddulph, Charles Biddulph, and Thomas Biddulph, to grant Leases of certain Manors, capital and other Messages, Mansion Houses, Farms, Lands, Tenements, and Hereditaments, situate in the several Counties of Surry, Sussex, and Stafford, of which they are Tenants for Life successively.
Hilborowe Inclosure Act 1769	9 Geo. 3. c. 18 Pr.	21 March 1769
An Act for dividing and enclosing the Common Fields, Commons, and Waste Grounds, in the Manor and Parish of Hilborowe, in the County of Norfolk.
Bleddington Inclosure Act 1769	9 Geo. 3. c. 19 Pr.	21 March 1769
An Act for dividing and enclosing certain Open and Common Fields, Common Meadows, and other Commonable Lands, and Waste Grounds, in the Parish of Bleddington, in the County of Gloucester.
Walburton Inclosure Act 1769	9 Geo. 3. c. 20 Pr.	21 March 1769
An Act for dividing and enclosing an Open Common, in the Parish of Walburton, in the County of Sussex.
Elvinton Inclosure Act 1769	9 Geo. 3. c. 21 Pr.	21 March 1769
An Act for dividing and enclosing certain Open Fields, Meadows, Ings, and Common Lands, within the Parish of Elvington, in the East Riding of the County of York.
Ingham Inclosure Act 1769	9 Geo. 3. c. 22 Pr.	21 March 1769
An Act for dividing and enclosing several Common Fields, Grounds, and Pastures, within the Parish of Ingham, in the County of Lincoln.
Wheldrake Inclosure Act 1769	9 Geo. 3. c. 23 Pr.	21 March 1769
An Act for dividing and enclosing several Open Fields, Meadow Grounds, and Ings, and the Moor or Common and Waste Ground within the Manor and Township of Wheldrake, in the County of York.
Sancton Inclosure Act 1769	9 Geo. 3. c. 24 Pr.	21 March 1769
An Act for dividing and enclosing certain Open Fields, Lands, and Grounds, within the Township of Sancton, in the East Riding of the County of York.
Eaton Inclosure Act 1769	9 Geo. 3. c. 25 Pr.	21 March 1769
An Act for dividing and enclosing the Open and Common Fields, Common Pastures, Common Meadows, and Waste Grounds, in the Parish of Eaton, in the County of Leicester.
North Hickham Inclosure Act 1769	9 Geo. 3. c. 26 Pr.	21 March 1769
An Act for dividing, enclosing, and draining, the Open Fields, Meadows, Fens, Pastures, Commons, and Waste Grounds, in the Parish of North Hickham, in the County of Lincoln.
Markfield Inclosure Act 1769	9 Geo. 3. c. 27 Pr.	21 March 1769
An Act for dividing and enclosing the Open Fields within the Lordship or Liberty of Markfield, in the County of Leicester, and the Common Ground there lying within the Ring or Boundaries of the same Fields, or adjoining thereto.
Grendon Underwood Inclosure Act 1769	9 Geo. 3. c. 28 Pr.	21 March 1769
An Act for dividing and enclosing the Common Arable Fields, Meadow Grounds, Commons, Pastures, and other Commonable Lands and Grounds, within the Manor or Parish of Grendon Underwood, in the County of Buckingham.
Shaxton, Shackston, or Shackerston (Leicestershire) Inclosure Act 1769	9 Geo. 3. c. 29 Pr.	21 March 1769
An Act for dividing and enclosing the Common Fields, Common Pastures, Waste Grounds, and other Commonable Lands, in the Parish of Shaxton, otherwise Shackston, otherwise Shackerston, in the County of Leicester.
Wimblington and Chatteris (Cambridgeshire) Inclosure Act 1769	9 Geo. 3. c. 30 Pr.	21 March 1769
An Act for the more effectual draining, embanking, and preserving, certain Fen Lands and Low Grounds, in the Hamlet of Wimblington, in the Parish of Doddington, and in the Parish of Chatteress, within the Isle of Ely, in the County of Cambridge.
Nafferton and Wansford (Yorkshire, East Riding) Inclosure Act 1769	9 Geo. 3. c. 31 Pr.	21 March 1769
An Act for dividing and enclosing several Open Fields, Common Pastures, and Open Lands and Grounds, within the Township of Nafferton and Wansford, in the Parish of Nafferton, in the East Riding of the County of York.
Thwing Inclosure Act 1769	9 Geo. 3. c. 32 Pr.	21 March 1769
An Act for dividing, enclosing, and allotting, the Open Fields, Lands, and Grounds, within the Manor and Parish of Thwing, in the East Riding of the County of York.
Atwick in Holderness Inclosure Act 1769	9 Geo. 3. c. 33 Pr.	21 March 1769
An Act for dividing and enclosing the several Open Fields, Lands, Meadows, Pastures, Moors, Commons, and other Open Grounds, within the Township of Atwick otherwise Attenwick, in Holderness, in the County of York.
Highedge Inclosure Act 1769	9 Geo. 3. c. 34 Pr.	21 March 1769
An Act for dividing and enclosing that Part or Share of Belper Ward, which belongeth to Highedge in the County of Derby.
St. Oswald Inclosure Act 1769	9 Geo. 3. c. 35 Pr.	21 March 1769
An Act for dividing and enclosing the Moor or Common called Crosgate Moor in the Parish of Saint Oswald, in the County Palatine of Durham, and for extinguishing all Right of Common in certain enclosed Intercommon Lands there.
Cublington Inclosure Act 1769	9 Geo. 3. c. 36 Pr.	21 March 1769
An Act for dividing and enclosing the Open and Common Fields, Common Pastures, Common Meadows, and Common and Waste Grounds, in the Manor, Parish, Liberties, or Precincts, of Cublington, in the County of Buckingham.
Reverend John Wood and sons: change of name to Davies, pursuant to the will of Reverend John Davies.	9 Geo. 3. c. 37 Pr.	21 March 1769
An Act to enable the Reverend John Wood, his First and other Sons, and their Heirs Male, to take and use the Surname of Davies, in pursuance of the Will of the Reverend John Davies Doctor in Divinity deceased.
Stephen Payne, and issue: change of name and arms to Gallway, pursuant to the will of Tobias Wall Galway.	9 Geo. 3. c. 38 Pr.	21 March 1769
An Act to enable Stephen Payne Esquire and his Issue to take, use, and bear, the Surname and Arms of Gallway, pursuant to the Will of Tobias Wall Gallway Esquire deceased.
Heshuysen's Naturalization Act 1769	9 Geo. 3. c. 39 Pr.	21 March 1769
An Act for naturalizing Lewis Diedrick Heshuysen.
Uhthoff's Naturalization Act 1769	9 Geo. 3. c. 40 Pr.	21 March 1769
An Act for naturalizing Henry Uhthoff.
Naturalization of Peter Rauert and David Godin.	9 Geo. 3. c. 41 Pr.	21 March 1769
An Act for naturalizing Peter Rauert, and David Lewis Godin.
Duke of Queensberry and Dover's Estate	9 Geo. 3. c. 42 Pr.	23 March 1769
An Act for vesting in Charles Duke of Queens-berry and Dover and his Heirs, in Fee Simple, certain Lands, Part of his entailed Estate in the County of Dumfries, and for settling in Lieu thereof other Lands lying contiguous to and interspersed with the said entailed Estate.
Broughton's Estate Estate Act 1769	9 Geo. 3. c. 43 Pr.	23 March 1769
An Act for vesting in Trustees certain Timber Trees and other Trees standing and being upon the Estates of Sir Thomas Broughton, in the Counties of Chester and Stafford, and to enable them to sell, cut down, sell, and dispose of the same; and to lay out a competent Part of the Money arising by the Sale thereof in rebuilding the ancient Mansion House of the Family, called Doddington Hall, in the County of Chester, and the necessary Offices to be enjoyed therewith; and for other Purposes.
Astley's Estate Act 1769	9 Geo. 3. c. 44 Pr.	23 March 1769
An Act for vesting the Settled Estate of Sir Edward Astley Baronet, in the County of Warwick, in him, in Fee Simple, discharged of the Uses of the Settlement made on his Marriage with Rhoda Astley his former Wife deceased, and for substituting and settling an undivided Moiety of other Lands and Hereditaments, in the County of Norfolk, of greater Value in Lieu thereof, to the same Uses, with such Powers as therein mentioned.
Swinburn's Estate Act 1769	9 Geo. 3. c. 45 Pr.	23 March 1769
An Act for vesting Part of the Settled Estates of John Swinburn Esquire, in the County of Northumberland and Town and County of the Town of Newcastle upon Tyne, in Trustees, in Trust to sell the same, and to lay out and apply the Money to arise by such Sale in the purchase of other Estates in the County of Durham; and for other Purposes therein mentioned.
Noel's Estate Act 1769	9 Geo. 3. c. 46 Pr.	23 March 1769
An Act for vesting the Estates of the Honourable William Noel Esquire deceased, situate in Stanford, in the County of Lincoln, in Trustees, to sell the same, and apply the Money arising therefrom as therein mentioned.
Lelley Inclosure Act 1769	9 Geo. 3. c. 47 Pr.	23 March 1769
An Act for dividing and enclosing the Open Arable Fields, Meadow, and Pasture Grounds, in the Township of Lelley, in the Parish of Preston, in Holdernesse, in the East Riding of the County of York.
South Willingham Inclosure Act 1769	9 Geo. 3. c. 48 Pr.	23 March 1769
An Act for dividing and enclosing certain. Open and Common Fields and Grounds, within the Parish of South Willingham, in the County of Lincoln.
Barnolby le Beck Inclosure Act 1769	9 Geo. 3. c. 49 Pr.	23 March 1769
An Act for dividing and enclosing certain Open Lands and Grounds, in the Parish of Barnoldby le Beck, in the County of Lincoln.
Waltham Inclosure Act 1769	9 Geo. 3. c. 50 Pr.	23 March 1769
An Act for dividing and enclosing certain Open and Common Fields and Grounds, within the Parish of Waltham, in the County of Lincoln.
Atterby, Snitterby, and Waddingham (Lincolnshire) Inclosure Act 1769	9 Geo. 3. c. 51 Pr.	23 March 1769
An Act for dividing and enclosing certain, Open Fields, Lands, and Grounds, in the several Townships of Atterby, Snitterby, and Waddingham, in the County of Lincoln.
Sutton and Norton (Yorkshire, East Riding) Inclosure Act 1769	9 Geo. 3. c. 52 Pr.	23 March 1769
An Act for dividing and enclosing the Town. Fields, Common Balks, Stinted Pastures, and Waste Grounds, in the Township of Sutton and Parish of Norton, in the East Riding of the County of York.
Sheriff Hutton and West Lilling (Yorkshire) inclosure and drainage.	9 Geo. 3. c. 53 Pr.	23 March 1769
An Act for dividing, enclosing, and draining, certain Open Fields, Lands, and Commons, within the Townships of Sheriff Button and West Lilling, in the Parish of Sheriff Button, in the County of York.
Osbaldwick, Gate Helmsley and Peterland Row (Yorkshire) Inclosure Act 1769	9 Geo. 3. c. 54 Pr.	23 March 1769
An Act for dividing and enclosing certain Open Grounds lying in Osbaldwick, with Gate Helmsley, and Peterland Row, in the County of York.
Walsingham Inclosure Act 1769	9 Geo. 3. c. 55 Pr.	23 March 1769
An Act for dividing and enclosing the Open and Common Fields, Arable, Meadow, and Pasture Grounds, within the Manor and Parish of Wolfingham, in the County Palatine of Durham.
Henry Duke of Grafton's Divorce Act 1769	9 Geo. 3. c. 56 Pr.	23 March 1769
An Act to dissolve the Marriage of Augustus Henry Duke of Grafton with the Honourable Ann Liddell his now Wife, and to enable him to marry again; and for other Purposes therein mentioned.
Worgan's Divorce Act 1769	9 Geo. 3. c. 57 Pr.	23 March 1769
An Act to dissolve the Marriage of John Worgan with Sarah Mackelcan his now Wife, and to enable him to marry again; and for other Purposes therein mentioned.
Duchess Dowager of Somerset's Estate Act 1769	9 Geo. 3. c. 58 Pr.	21 April 1769
An Act for selling the Capital Messuage or Mansion House called Percy Lodge, and divers Lands and Hereditaments, in the County of Bucks, devised by the Will of the Most Noble Frances late Duchess Dowager of Somerset; and for laying out the Money! arising by such Sale in the Purchase of other Lands and Hereditaments, to be settled in lieu thereof, to the same Uses.
Earl of Shelburne's Estate Act 1769	9 Geo. 3. c. 59 Pr.	21 April 1769
An Act for vesting Part of the Real Estate, devised and directed to be Purchased by the Will of Henry Earl of Shelburne, in the Kingdom of Ireland, deceased, and in Tokenhouse Yard, London, in Trustees, to be sold or mortgaged; and for laying out the Money arising by Sale or Mortgage thereof in the Purchase of Manors, Lands, or Hereditaments, in England, to be settled to the Uses of his said Will, and for enabling the Persons therein mentioned to grant such Leases as are therein expressed.
Manor of Wolverley Act 1769	9 Geo. 3. c. 60 Pr.	21 April 1769
An Act for changing and altering the Course of Descent (of Copyhold Estates, held of the Manor of Wolverley, in the County of Worcester) from the Nature of Borough English, to the Course of Descent according to Common Law.
Prebendary of St. Paul London (Leasing) Act 1769	9 Geo. 3. c. 61 Pr.	21 April 1769
An Act to, enable the Reverend Christopher Wilson Doctor in Divinity, Prebendary of the Cathedral Church of Saint Paul, London, to make, and grant unto the Mayor, and Commonalty, and Citizens, of the City of London, a Lease of the Prebendal Estate of, Halliwell and Finsbury, in the Suburbs of the said City, for a Term of Ninety-nine Years.
Barrow's Estate Act 1769	9 Geo. 3. c. 62 Pr.	21 April 1769
An Act for vesting the Settled Estate of John Barrow, in the County of Chester, in Trustees, to be sold for the Pay merit of Debts and other Purposes therein mentioned.
Chichester's Estate Act 1769	9 Geo. 3. c. 63 Pr.	21 April 1769
An Act for vesting the Real Estates late of Richard Chichester Esquire deceased, in England, in Trustees, to be sold to raise Money to be applied to pay off the Legacies charged upon and affecting the same, and the Interest thereof, under the, Direction of the Court of Chancery, and for the other Purposes therein mentioned.
Chapman's Estate Act 1769	9 Geo. 3. c. 64 Pr.	21 April 1769
An Act to empower Anthony Chapman Esquire to grant Leases of Part of his Settled Estates in the County of Middlesex and City of London.
Kingston upon Thames (Surrey) Vicarage Division Act 1769	9 Geo. 3. c. 65 Pr.	21 April 1769
An Act for dividing the Vicarage of Kingston upon Thames, in the County of Surrey, with the several Chapelries or Curacies thereto belonging, or thereon dependent, into Two separate Vicarages, and Two separate perpetual Curacies, in such Manner as is therein mentioned.
Bristol City Corporation Act 1769	9 Geo. 3. c. 66 Pr.	21 April 1769
An Act to enable the Corporation of the City of Bristol to exchange the Building of the Hospital called Queen Elizabeth's Hospital, (Note: Queen Elizabeth's Hospital.) for the Building called The Bartholomew's, (Note: St Bartholomew's Hospital, Bristol.) in the said City, and for altering the Times for holding Bristol Fairs.
Ruislip Inclosure Act 1769 or the St. Catherine's Inclosure Act 1769	9 Geo. 3. c. 67 Pr.	21 April 1769
An Act for enclosing and dividing several Woods and Woodlands, and a certain Close or Parcel of Land or Ground called West Coat Wood Close, and the Commons and Waste Grounds within the Manors of Saint Catherine End, in the Parish of Ryslip, in the County of Middlesex.
Youlthorpe Inclosure Act 1769	9 Geo. 3. c. 68 Pr.	21 April 1769
An Act for dividing and enclosing several Common Arable Fields, Common Pastures, and other enclosed Grounds, within the Township of Youlthorpe, in the East Riding of the County of York.
Poppleton and Scaglethorpe (Yorkshire) Inclosure Act 1769	9 Geo. 3. c. 69 Pr.	21 April 1769
An Act for dividing and enclosing several Open Fields, Meadows, Ings, Stinted Pastures, and other Lands and Grounds, within the Manor of Poppleton, and a Piece of Waste Ground called Scaglethorpe Moor, in the Manor of Scaglethorpe, all in the County of the City of York.
Ebberston Inclosure Act 1769	9 Geo. 3. c. 70 Pr.	21 April 1769
An Act for dividing and enclosing several Open Fields, Grounds, Common, and Waste within the Township of Ebberston, in the County of York, and for other Purposes therein mentioned.
Hutton Cranswick Inclosure Act 1769	9 Geo. 3. c. 71 Pr.	21 April 1769
An Act for dividing and enclosing certain Open Arable Fields, Meadow Grounds, Commons, Pastures, and other Commonable Lands and Grounds, within the Township of Hutton Cranswick, in the East Riding of the County of York.
Haxby Inclosure Act 1769	9 Geo. 3. c. 72 Pr.	21 April 1769
An Act for dividing and enclosing several Common Arable Fields, in the Moor or Common within the Township of Haxby, in the North Riding of the County of York.
Knuston Inclosure Act 1769	9 Geo. 3. c. 73 Pr.	21 April 1769
An Act for dividing and enclosing the Open Fields and other Commonable Lands and Grounds, in the Hamlet of Knuston, in the Parish of Chester, in the County of Northampton.
Orton Inclosure Act 1769	9 Geo. 3. c. 74 Pr.	21 April 1769
An Act for dividing and enclosing the Open Commons and Waste Grounds, within the Manor of Orton, in the County of Westmorland.
Chipping Norton and Salford Inclosure Act 1769	9 Geo. 3. c. 75 Pr.	21 April 1769
An Act for dividing and enclosing certain Open and Common Fields and Commonable Lands, in the Parishes of Chipping Norton and Salford, in the County of Oxford.
Elsdon Inclosure Act 1769	9 Geo. 3. c. 76 Pr.	21 April 1769
An Act for dividing and enclosing a Moor or Common called Troughend Common, in the Parish of Elsdon, in the County of Northumberland.
Fleckney Inclosure Act 1769	9 Geo. 3. c. 77 Pr.	21 April 1769
An Act for dividing and enclosing the Open and Common Fields of Fleckney, in the County of Leicester.
Holyrood Ampney or Ampney Crusis, and Ampney Mary or Ashbrook (Gloucestershire) Inclosure Act 1769	9 Geo. 3. c. 78 Pr.	21 April 1769
An Act for dividing and enclosing the Open and Common Fields, Common Meadows, Downs, and Commonable Lands, lying within the Manors and Parishes of Holyrood Ampney otherwise Ampney Cruris, and Ampney Mary otherwise Ashbrook, in the County of Gloucester.
Thulston or Thurlston (Leicestershire) Inclosure Act 1769	9 Geo. 3. c. 79 Pr.	21 April 1769
An Act for dividing and enclosing the Open and Common Fields of Thurlston, otherwise Thurlston, in the County of Leicester.
Wigginton Inclosure Act 1769	9 Geo. 3. c. 80 Pr.	21 April 1769
An Act for dividing and enclosing the Common and Walle Grounds of the Township of Wigginton, in the County of York.
Laughton-en-le-Morthem Inclosure Act 1769	9 Geo. 3. c. 81 Pr.	21 April 1769
An Act for dividing and enclosing the several Open Fields, Arable Lands, and Waste Grounds, within the several Manors and Lordships of Laughton-en-le-Morthen, Slade Hooton, and Hooton Slade, in the Parish of Laughton-en-le-Morthen, in the West Riding of the County of York.
Rolle's Estate Act 1769	9 Geo. 3. c. 82 Pr.	1 May 1769
An Act for discharging certain Estates of Denys Rolle Esquire, in the Counties of Somerset and Wilts, from the Uses thereof limited and declared, and for vesting the same in Trustees, to be sold, and applying the Purchase Money for the Purposes therein mentioned; and for settling other Estates, in the County of Devon, of greater Value, to the like Uses.
Dolman's Estate Act 1769	9 Geo. 3. c. 83 Pr.	1 May 1769
An Act for revoking and making void Part of the Trusts declared by an Act of Parliament, passed in the Fifth Year of the Reign of His present Majesty, intituled, "An act for selling Part of the Settled Estates of Robert Dolman Esquire, in Pocklington, and elsewhere, in the County of York, for discharging the Debts and Incumbrances of himself and Robert Dolman the Younger his eldest Son, affecting the same; and for making Provision for Robert Dolman the Younger, and for the younger Children of Robert Dolman the Elder;" (Note: Dolman's Estate Act 1765 (5 Geo. 3. c. 91 Pr.)) and for declaring other Trusts relative thereto; and for making Provision for Payment of other Debts and Incumbrances of the said Robert Dolman the Elder and Robert Dolman the Younger, not provided for by the said Act; and for making a Recompence and Provision for the First and other Sons in Succession, or other Heir, of the Bodies of the said Robert Dolman the Younger and Peggy his Wife, during the Lives of their said Father and Mother, and the Survivor of them; and for the better Security of Purchasers under the said Act.
Whitehurst's Estate Act 1769	9 Geo. 3. c. 84 Pr.	1 May 1769
An Act for vesting Part of the Settled Estates of the Reverend Thomas Whitehurst Clerk, and Sarah his Wife, in the Counties of Hertford and Bedford, in the said Thomas Whitehurst in Fee Simple; and for settling other Estates of the said Thomas Whitehurst, in the said County of Hertford, to the same Uses as the said Estates were settled.
Confirming and executing agreements between William Hurst, William Powell and others for raising money from Thomas Herberts' estates in Glamorgan and Monmouthshire for payment of Lucy Alien's debts and legacies and settling the residue for uses of her will.	9 Geo. 3. c. 85 Pr.	1 May 1769
An Act for confirming and carrying into Execution certain Agreements entered into between William Hurst, William Powell, Esquires, and others, for raising Money out of the Estates late of Thomas Herbert Esquire, in the Counties of Glamorgan and Monmouth, for Payment of the Debts and Legacies of Lucy Allen, and for other Purposes; and for settling the Residue of the said Estates to the Uses of her Will.
Markham's Estate Act 1769	9 Geo. 3. c. 86 Pr.	1 May 1769
An Act for vesting in Trustees, to be sold, the Freehold and Inheritance of the Estate of George Markham Esquire deceased, in the County of Lincoln, along with a Precedent Term therein, and for other Purposes.
Obviating a debt on Peregrine Bertie's marriage settlement.	9 Geo. 3. c. 87 Pr.	1 May 1769
An Act for obviating a Doubt arising on the Settlement of Peregrine Bertie Esquire with Catherine his present Wife.
Indemnifying Thomas and Francis Twistleton, purchasers of James and Charlotte Ness' lands in Oxfordshire, as to payment of their purchase money and settling the same for purposes therein mentioned.	9 Geo. 3. c. 88 Pr.	1 May 1769
An Act for indemnifying Thomas Twisleton and Francis Twisleton Esquires, the Purchasers of certain Lands and Hereditaments in the County of Oxford, belonging to James Ness Gentleman and Charlotte his Wife, as to the Payment of their Purchase Money, and settling the same for the Purposes therein mentioned.
Bishop Wilton Inclosure Act 1769	9 Geo. 3. c. 89 Pr.	1 May 1769
An Act for dividing and enclosing several Open Fields, Common Pastures, and Parcels of Land and Grounds, within the Township of Bishop Wilton, in the East Riding of the County of York.
Sundon Inclosure Act 1769.	9 Geo. 3. c. 90 Pr.	1 May 1769
An Act for dividing and enclosing the Common Fields, and other Commonable Lands and Grounds, within the Manor and Parish of Sundon, in the County of Bedford.
Hucknal-Torkard Inclosure Act 1769	9 Geo. 3. c. 91 Pr.	1 May 1769
An Act for dividing and enclosing all the Open Fields, Meadows, Pastures, and all other Open, Commonable, and Waste Lands, within the Parish of Hucknal-Torkard, in the County of Nottingham.
Coln St. Aldwins Inclosure Act 1769	9 Geo. 3. c. 92 Pr.	1 May 1769
An Act for dividing and enclosing the Open and Common Fields, Downs, and Commonable Lands, within the Manor and Lordship of Coln Saint Aldwins, in the County of Gloucester.
Sudbrook Inclosure Act 1769	9 Geo. 3. c. 93 Pr.	1 May 1769
An Act for dividing and enclosing the Open Fields, Meadows, Pastures, and other Commonable Lands, in the Liberties of Sudbrook, within the Manor and Parish of Ancaster, in the County of Lincoln.
Claypole Inclosure Act 1769	9 Geo. 3. c. 94 Pr.	1 May 1769
An Act for dividing and enclosing the Open Fields, Meadows, and Pastures, in the Lordship of Claypole, within the Manor and Parish of Claypole, in the County of Lincoln.
Bramley Inclosure Act 1769	9 Geo. 3. c. 95 Pr.	1 May 1769
An Act for dividing and enclosing certain Commons or Moors within the Township of Bramley, in the Parish of Braithwell, in the County of York.
Wootton Inclosure Act 1769	9 Geo. 3. c. 96 Pr.	1 May 1769
An Act for dividing and enclosing certain Open and Common Fields, Commonable Lands, and Waste Grounds, in the Parish of Wootton, in the County of Oxford.
Horsington, Wincanton and Mapperton (Somerset) Inclosure Act 1769	9 Geo. 3. c. 97 Pr.	1 May 1769
An Act for enclosing certain Common and unenclosed Tracts of Land in the Parishes of Horsington, Wincanton, and Mapperton, in the County of Somerset.
Beckingham and Sutton Inclosure Act 1769	9 Geo. 3. c. 98 Pr.	1 May 1769
An Act for dividing and enclosing the Open Fields, Meadows, Common Pastures, and Waste Grounds, within the Townships of Beckingham and Sutton, in the Manor and Parish of Beckingham, in the County of Lincoln.
Thornley and Brancepeth Inclosure Act 1769	9 Geo. 3. c. 99 Pr.	1 May 1769
An Act for dividing and enclosing a certain Moor or Common, in the Township of Thornley, in the Parish of Wolsingham, and within the Manor of Brancepeth, in the County Palatine of Durham.
Pavenham Inclosure Act 1769	9 Geo. 3. c. 100 Pr.	1 May 1769
An Act for dividing and enclosing the Open and Common Fields, Common Meadows, Common Pastures, and other Commonable Lands and Grounds, within the Parish and Liberty of Pavenham, in the County of Bedford.
Bedworth Inclosure Act 1769	9 Geo. 3. c. 101 Pr.	1 May 1769
An Act for dividing and enclosing the Common Fields, Common Grounds, and Commonable Lands, in the Parish and Township of Bedworth, in the County of Warwick; and for regulating certain Charity Estates within the said Parish.
Middleton Cheney Inclosure Act 1769	9 Geo. 3. c. 102 Pr.	1 May 1769
An Act for dividing and enclosing a certain Open and Common Field, and Commonable Lands, in the Townships and Liberties of Upper Middleton Cheney and Lower Middleton Cheney, in the County of Northampton.
Aclome Inclosure Act 1769	9 Geo. 3. c. 103 Pr.	1 May 1769
An Act for dividing and enclosing the Common Fields, Common Pastures, and other unenclosed Grounds, within the Manor and Township of Aclome, in the East Riding of the County of York.
Nottinghamshire (Laneham, Rampton, &c.) Inclosures Act 1769	9 Geo. 3. c. 104 Pr.	1 May 1769
An Act for embanking, draining, and preserving, certain Low Grounds in the Parishes or Townships of Laneham, Rampton, Treswell, South Leverton, North Leverton, Habblesthorpe otherwise Apesthorpe, Littlebrough, Sturton, Fenton, and West Burton, in the County of Nottingham.
James Grenville and Charles Earl Cornwallis Oaths of Office Act 1769	9 Geo. 3. c. 105 Pr.	1 May 1769
An Act to enable the Right Honourable James Grenville and the Right Honourable Charles Earl Cornwallis to take, in Great Britain, the Oath of Office as Vice Treasurer, and Receiver General, and Paymaster General, of all His Majesty's Revenues in the Kingdom of Ireland, and to qualify themselves for the Enjoyment of the said Offices.
Mosely's Name Act 1769	9 Geo. 3. c. 106 Pr.	1 May 1769
An Act to enable William Walsh, heretofore called William Mosely, and his Issue, to take and use the Surname and Arms of Walsh, pursuant to the Will of William Walsh deceased.
Canale's Naturalization and Name Act 1769	9 Geo. 3. c. 107 Pr.	1 May 1769
An Act for naturalizing Samuel Canale Esquire, and to enable him and his Issue to take and use the Surname and Arms of Thorold.
Naturalization of Gerard Backus and Leonard Holls Act 1769	9 Geo. 3. c. 108 Pr.	1 May 1769
An Act for naturalizing Gerard Backus and Leonard Holl.
Hoffman's Naturalization Act 1769	9 Geo. 3. c. 109 Pr.	1 May 1769
An Act for naturalizing John Christian Hoffman.
Earl of Stafford's Estate Act 1769	9 Geo. 3. c. 110 Pr.	9 May 1769
An Act for vesting the Estates of the Right Honourable William late Earl of Stafford deceased, in the Counties of Stafford and Salop, devised by his Will in Trustees, to be sold for the Payment of the Debts and Incumbrances affecting the same; and for other Purposes.
Torre's Estates Act 1769	9 Geo. 3. c. 111 Pr.	9 May 1769
An Act for vesting in Trustees several Real Estates, late of Jane Torre Widow deceased, in Hessle, Tranby, Anlaby, and elsewhere, within the County of the Town of Kingston upon Hull, which were given and devised by her Will to and for the Benefit of the Reverend Mr. James Torre Clerk her Son, and his Children, upon Trust, to sell the same, and apply the Money to arise by the Sale in Manner therein expressed.
Blidworth Inclosure Act 1769	9 Geo. 3. c. 112 Pr.	9 May 1769
An Act for dividing and enclosing several Open Fields, Common and Waste Grounds, in the Parish of Blidworth, in the County of Nottingham.

=== Sources ===
- "9 George III - 1768-9". The Statutes at Large. Vol. 28. C. Eyre and A. Strahan. 1768 – via Internet Archive.
- "9 George III - 1768-9". The Statutes at Large. Vol. 28. 1768 – via Google Books.
- "9 George III - 1768-9". The Statutes at Large. Vol. 28. Printed by J. Bentham. 1807 – via Internet Archive.
- Journals of the House of Commons. Vol. 32. London: His Majesty's Stationery Office. 1803. pp. 19–453 – via Google Books.
- Chronological Table of and Index to the Statutes. Vol. 1: To the End of the Session 59 Vict. Sess. 2 (1895) (13th ed.). London: Her Majesty's Stationery Office. 1896. pp. 125–126 – via Google Books.

== See also ==
- List of acts of the Parliament of Great Britain
