= Crown Suits Act 1769 =

Act of the Parliament of Great Britain

Crown Suits Act 1769 (Note: The citation of this act by this short title was authorised by section 1 of, and the first schedule to, the Short Titles Act 1896. Due to the repeal of those provisions it is now authorised by section 19(2) of the Interpretation Act 1978.)
- Act of Parliament
- Parliament of Great Britain
- Long title: An Act to amend and render more effectual an Act made in the Twenty-first Year of the Reign of King James the First, intituled, An Act for the general Quiet of the Subjects against all Pretences of Concealment whatsoever. (Note: Crown Suits, etc. Act 1623 (21 Jas. 1. c. 2))
- Citation: 9 Geo. 3. c. 16
- Territorial extent: Great Britain

Dates
- Royal assent: 21 March 1769
- Commencement: 8 November 1768 (Note: Start of session.)
- Repealed: 1 July 1940
Other legislation
Amends	Crown Suits, etc. Act 1623
Amended by	Duchy of Cornwall Act 1860; Statute Law Revision Act 1888
Repealed by	Limitation Act 1939

Status: Repealed

Text of statute as originally enacted

The Crown Suits Act 1769 (9 Geo. 3. c. 16) was an act of the Parliament of Great Britain passed in 1769.

In 1765 William Cavendish-Bentinck, 3rd Duke of Portland, brought against James Lowther, 1st Earl of Lonsdale and the corporation of Carlisle bills in chancery for the perpetuation of testimony, believing that he was the owner of a fishery on the River Eden in right of the socage manor of Carlisle. However, because of the type of fishing carried on by the defendants it had become useless. Lonsdale's team discovered in the original grant from William III to the first Duke of Portland that the socage manor of Carlisle and the forest of Inglewood had been expressly omitted in the grant. An act from the reign of James I, the Crown Suits, etc. Act 1623 (21 Jas. 1. c. 2) however, had laid down that the title for lands in undisturbed possession of over sixty years could no longer be challenged except by the Crown. In 1767, therefore, Lonsdale successfully petitioned the Treasury for a grant of Crown interest in the two properties "for three lives, on such terms as to their lordships should seem meet". Portland's allies claimed no land was safe if the legal maxim Nullum tempus occurrit regi ("No time runs against the king") was to be implemented. In February 1767, therefore, Sir George Savile introduced a bill to abrogate the legal maximum and to abolish Lonsdale's rights. This was defeated by 134 votes to 114.

In 1768 another bill was introduced, this time including a clause that excluded all Crown grants made before 1 January 1769 from the operation of the bill unless the grantees prosecuted their claims within one year. With the passing of this act Lonsdale at once filed a bill against Portland and evicted three hundred tenants. However, the Court of Exchequer ruled against Lonsdale on the grounds that the grant was unlawful under the provisions of the Crown Lands Act 1702 (1 Ann. c. 1) because of the insufficiency of the rent reserved by the Crown. Portland's title to the socage manor of Carlisle and Inglewood forest was never tried and he eventually sold the properties to the Duke of Devonshire in 1787.

== Subsequent developments ==
The whole act was repealed by section 34(4) of, and the schedule to, the Limitation Act 1939 (2 & 3 Geo. 6. c. 21), which came into force on 1 July 1940.
