= Duchy of Cornwall Act 1860 =

Act of the Parliament of the United Kingdom

Duchy of Cornwall Act 1860 (Note: The citation of this act by this short title was authorised by section 5 of, and the second schedule to, the Statute Law Revision Act 1948. Due to the repeal of those provisions, it is now authorised by section 19(2) of the Interpretation Act 1978.)
- Act of Parliament
- Parliament of the United Kingdom
- Long title: An Act for the limitation of actions and suits by the Duke of Cornwall in relation to real property and for authorising certain leases of possessions of the Duchy. (Note: These words are printed against this act in the second column of the second schedule to the Statute Law Revision Act 1948, which is headed "Title".)
- Citation: 23 & 24 Vict. c. 53
- Territorial extent: United Kingdom

Dates
- Royal assent: 23 July 1860
- Commencement: 23 July 1860 (Note: The Acts of Parliament (Commencement) Act 1793.)
- Repealed: 31 July 1978
Other legislation
Amends	Crown Suits Act 1769
Repealed by	Statute Law (Repeals) Act 1978

Status: Repealed

Text of statute as originally enacted

The Duchy of Cornwall Act 1860 (23 & 24 Vict. c. 53), sometimes referred to as the Duchy of Cornwall (Limitation of Actions, etc.) Act 1860, was an act of the Parliament of the United Kingdom.

== Subsequent developments ==
Sections 1 and 2 of the act were repealed by section 34(4) of, and the schedule to, the Limitation Act 1939 (2 & 3 Geo. 6. c. 21), which came into force on 1 July 1940.

The whole act was repealed by section 1(1) of, and part IV of schedule 1 to, the Statute Law (Repeals) Act 1978, which came into force on 31 July 1978.
