= Glenfinnan railway station =

Railway station in the Highlands of Scotland

Glenfinnan Scottish Gaelic: Gleann Fhionnainn
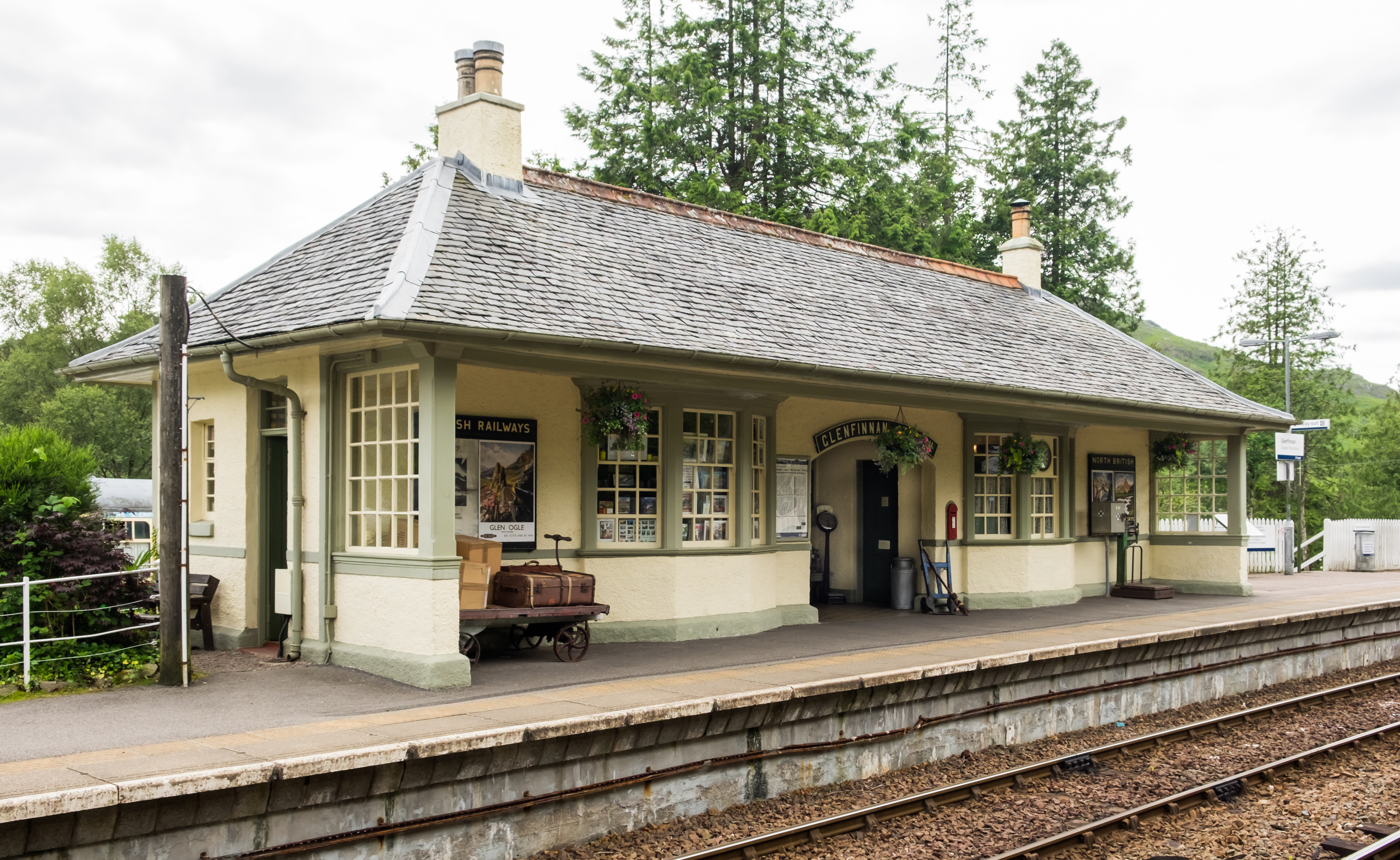
- The station ticket office and waiting room in June 2017

General information
- Location: Glenfinnan, Highland; Scotland
- Coordinates: 56.8725°N 5.4495°W
- Grid reference: NM898809
- Manager: ScotRail
- Platforms: 2

Other information
- Station code: GLF

History
- Original company: Mallaig Extension Railway of West Highland Railway
- Pre-grouping: North British Railway
- Post-grouping: LNER

Key dates
- 1 April 1901: Station opened

Passengers
- 2021/22: ▲7,924
- 2022/23: ▲13,420
- 2023/24: ▲19,764
- 2024/25: ▼18,274
- 2025/26: ▲22,362

Listed Building – Category B
- Designated: 29 May 1985
- Reference no.: LB312
Location
Notes
- Passenger statistics from the Office of Rail and Road

Glenfinnan railway station is a railway station serving the village of Glenfinnan in the Highland council area of Scotland. It is on the West Highland Line, between Lochailort and Locheilside, located 14 miles 58 chains (23.7 km) from the former Banavie Junction. Glenfinnan Viaduct is about 0.7 miles (1 km) to the east of the station. ScotRail, who manage the station, operate all services.

== History ==
The Glenfinnan Railway Station was opened on 1 April 1901.

The architecture of the station followed designs by the Scottish architect, James Miller, who designed the 'chalet style' railway stations along the West Highland Line and built using mass concrete construction by Robert McAlpine.

The station has two platforms, one on either side of a crossing loop. There are sidings on the south side of the station.

The station was host to a LNER camping coach from 1936 to 1939. A camping coach was also positioned here by the Scottish Region from 1952 to 1962, the coach was replaced in 1963 by a Pullman camping coach which was joined by another Pullman in 1967 until all camping coaches in the region were withdrawn at the end of the 1969 season.

=== Accidents and incidents ===
On 22 January 2018, a Class 156 forming a Mallaig-Glasgow Queen Street service struck a landslip near the station and was derailed. There were no injuries.

=== Glenfinnan Station Museum ===
The Glenfinnan Station Museum opened in 1991 and is located in the station building, on the Down platform. The museum's exhibits focus on the construction, impact and operation of the Mallaig Extension Railway in the late 19th century. The former signal box is also part of the museum and is fully interactive.

== Facilities ==
Platform 1 is equipped with a waiting room and a bench (the only facilities on platform 2), a help point and cycle racks. It is also adjacent to the car park, to which there is step-free access. The only access to platform 2 is via one of two barrow crossings. As there are no facilities to purchase tickets, passengers must buy one in advance, or from the guard on the train.

== Passenger volume ==
Passenger Volume at Glenfinnan
	2004–05	2005–06	2006–07	2007–08	2008–09	2009–10	2010–11	2011–12	2012–13	2013–14	2014–15	2015–16	2016–17	2017–18	2018–19	2019–20	2020–21	2021–22	2022–23	2023–24	2024–25
Entries and exits	3,853	4,584	5,420	5,307	5,750	6,682	7,402	7,172	8,246	7,736	8,778	9,418	9,122	11,620	12,486	13,864	1,876	7,924	13,420	19,764	18,274

The statistics cover twelve month periods that start in April.

== Services ==
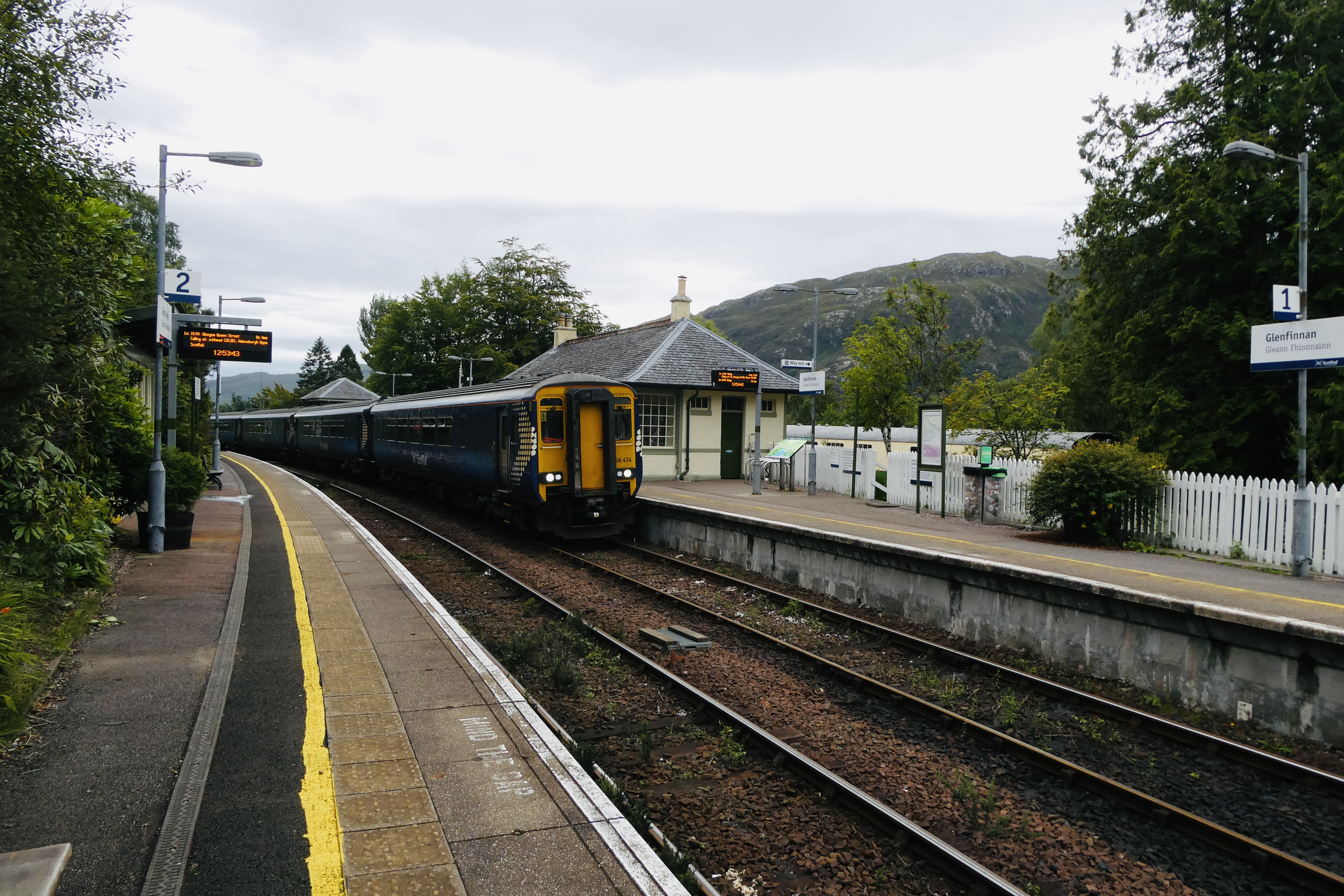
156474 and 156476 arrive at Glenfinnan with a ScotRail service bound for Mallaig.

There are four trains per day to Mallaig and three to Glasgow Queen Street, plus a fourth to Fort William that connects with the overnight Caledonian Sleeper to London Euston on weekdays. On Sundays there are three trains per day each way.

Preceding station	National Rail	Following station
Locheilside	ScotRail; West Highland Line	Lochailort
	Historical railways	
Locheilside; Line and Station open	North British Railway; Mallaig Extension Railway of West Highland Railway	Lochailort; Line and Station open

== Bibliography ==
- Brailsford, Martyn, ed. (December 2017) [1987]. Railway Track Diagrams 1: Scotland & Isle of Man (6th ed.). Frome: Trackmaps. ISBN 978-0-9549866-9-8.
- Butt, R. V. J. (October 1995). The Directory of Railway Stations: details every public and private passenger station, halt, platform and stopping place, past and present (1st ed.). Sparkford: Patrick Stephens Ltd. ISBN 978-1-85260-508-7. OCLC 60251199. OL 11956311M.
- McRae, Andrew (1997). British Railway Camping Coach Holidays: The 1930s & British Railways (London Midland Region). Vol. Scenes from the Past: 30 (Part One). Foxline. ISBN 1-870119-48-7.
- McRae, Andrew (1998). British Railways Camping Coach Holidays: A Tour of Britain in the 1950s and 1960s. Vol. Scenes from the Past: 30 (Part Two). Foxline. ISBN 1-870119-53-3.
- Jowett, Alan (March 1989). Jowett's Railway Atlas of Great Britain and Ireland: From Pre-Grouping to the Present Day (1st ed.). Sparkford: Patrick Stephens Ltd. ISBN 978-1-85260-086-0. OCLC 22311137.
- Jowett, Alan (2000). Jowett's Nationalised Railway Atlas (1st ed.). Penryn, Cornwall: Atlantic Transport Publishers. ISBN 978-0-906899-99-1. OCLC 228266687.
