= Morar railway station =

Railway station in Scottish Highlands

Morar Scottish Gaelic: Mòrar
- View looking towards Mallaig

General information
- Location: Morar, Highland; Scotland
- Coordinates: 56.9690°N 5.8222°W
- Grid reference: NM677929
- Manager: ScotRail
- Platforms: 1

Other information
- Station code: MRR

History
- Original company: Mallaig Extension Railway of West Highland Railway
- Pre-grouping: North British Railway
- Post-grouping: LNER

Key dates
- 1 April 1901: Station opened

Passengers
- 2021/22: ▲3,218
- 2022/23: ▼3,204
- 2023/24: ▲4,288
- 2024/25: ▲4,290
- 2025/26: ▲4,528
Location
Notes
- Passenger statistics from the Office of Rail and Road

Morar railway station is a railway station serving the village of Morar in the Highland region of Scotland. This station is on the West Highland Line, between Arisaig and Mallaig, 36 miles 59 chains (59.1 km) from the former Banavie Junction, near Fort William. ScotRail, who manage the station, operate all the services here.

== History ==
Morar station was opened on 1 April 1901 when the Mallaig Extension Railway opened. The station was host to a LNER camping coach from 1936 to 1939. A camping coach was also positioned here by the Scottish Region from 1952 to 1959, the coach was replaced in 1960 by a Pullman camping coach which was joined by another Pullman in 1964 until all camping coaches in the region were withdrawn at the end of the 1969 season. These coaches were converted from a Pullman car, and were fitted with a full kitchen, two sleeping compartments and a room with two single beds.

== Facilities ==
The level crossing at the station

The station has a small car park, a help point, cycle racks and some seats, and has step-free access. As there are no facilities to purchase tickets, passengers must buy one in advance, or from the guard on the train.

== Services ==
On weekdays and Saturdays, there are 4 trains in each direction to Mallaig and Fort William. Three of the four Fort William trains extend to Glasgow Queen Street. On Sundays, this decreases to three each way, with one eastbound train terminating at Fort William.

Preceding station	National Rail	Following station
Arisaig	ScotRail; West Highland Line	Mallaig
	Historical railways	
Arisaig; Line and Station open	North British Railway; Mallaig Extension Railway of West Highland Railway	Mallaig; Line and Station open

== Bibliography ==
- Brailsford, Martyn, ed. (December 2017) [1987]. Railway Track Diagrams 1: Scotland & Isle of Man (6th ed.). Frome: Trackmaps. ISBN 978-0-9549866-9-8.
- Butt, R. V. J. (October 1995). The Directory of Railway Stations: details every public and private passenger station, halt, platform and stopping place, past and present (1st ed.). Sparkford: Patrick Stephens Ltd. ISBN 978-1-85260-508-7. OCLC 60251199. OL 11956311M.
- McRae, Andrew (1997). British Railway Camping Coach Holidays: The 1930s & British Railways (London Midland Region). Vol. Scenes from the Past: 30 (Part One). Foxline. ISBN 1-870119-48-7.
- McRae, Andrew (1998). British Railways Camping Coach Holidays: A Tour of Britain in the 1950s and 1960s. Vol. Scenes from the Past: 30 (Part Two). Foxline. ISBN 1-870119-53-3.
- Thomas, John; Turnock, David (1989). A Regional History of the Railways of Great Britain. Vol. 15 The North of Scotland (1st ed.). Newton Abbott, Devon: David & Charles. ISBN 0-946537-03-8.
- Jowett, Alan (March 1989). Jowett's Railway Atlas of Great Britain and Ireland: From Pre-Grouping to the Present Day (1st ed.). Sparkford: Patrick Stephens Ltd. ISBN 978-1-85260-086-0. OCLC 22311137.
- Jowett, Alan (2000). Jowett's Nationalised Railway Atlas (1st ed.). Penryn, Cornwall: Atlantic Transport Publishers. ISBN 978-0-906899-99-1. OCLC 228266687.
