= Beasdale railway station =

Railway station serving Glen Beasdale in the Highland region of Scotland

Beasdale Scottish Gaelic: Biasdail
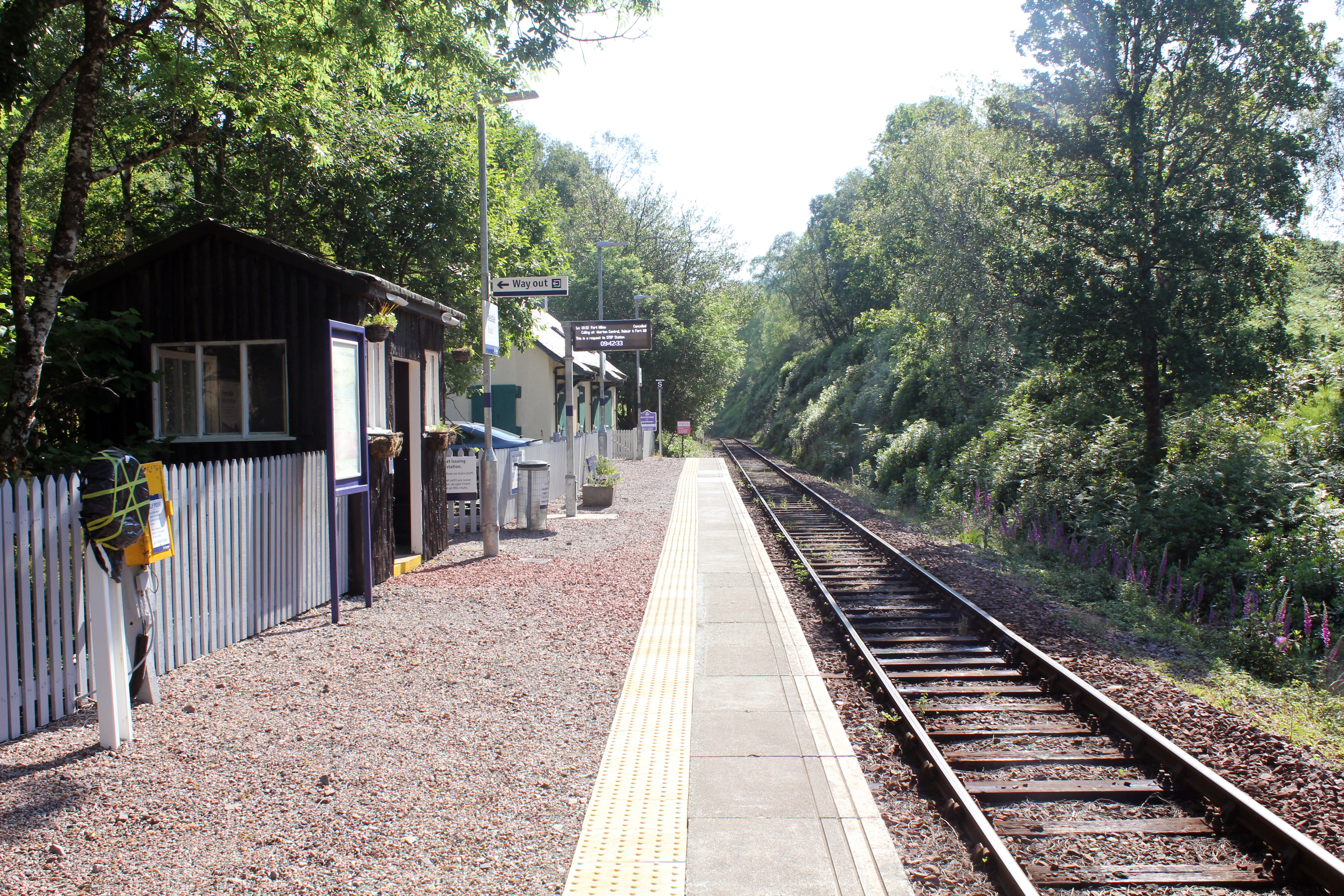
- The station seen in 2023

General information
- Location: Glen Beasdale, Highland; Scotland
- Coordinates: 56.9001°N 5.7640°W
- Grid reference: NM709850
- Manager: ScotRail
- Platforms: 1

Other information
- Station code: BSL

History
- Original company: Mallaig Extension Railway of West Highland Railway
- Pre-grouping: North British Railway
- Post-grouping: LNER

Key dates
- 1 April 1901: Station opened
- 6 September 1965: Opened to the public

Passengers
- 2021/22: ▲162
- 2022/23: ▲170
- 2023/24: ▲260
- 2024/25: ▼230
- 2025/26: ▲274
Location
Notes
- Passenger statistics from the Office of Rail and Road

Beasdale railway station is a railway station serving Glen Beasdale in the Highland region of Scotland. This station is on the West Highland Line, sited 28 miles 49 chains (46.0 km) from the former Banavie Junction, between Lochailort and Arisaig. ScotRail manage the station and operate all services.

== History ==
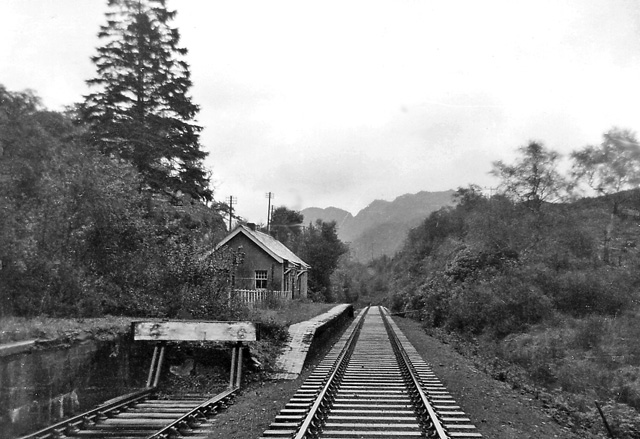
Longer distance view (1961)

It was originally a private station for the nearby Arisaig House, and the station was thus originally opened on 1 April 1901, but was fully open to the public from 6 September 1965.

The former station building is now a private holiday cottage. It underwent an upgrade in 2025.

== Facilities ==
The station is equipped with a bench, a shelter and a help point, with a small car park adjacent to the station.

== Passenger volume ==
Beasdale was one of six railway stations in Britain to see zero passengers in the 2020/21 period, due to decreased travel throughout the COVID-19 pandemic. It was therefore Britain's joint-least-used station alongside Abererch, Llanbedr, Sampford Courtenay, Stanlow and Thornton and Sugar Loaf.

It has been noted to consistently be one of the lesser-used stations across Scotland.

Passenger Volume at Beasdale
	2004–05	2005–06	2006–07	2007–08	2008–09	2009–10	2010–11	2011–12	2012–13	2013–14	2014–15	2015–16	2016–17	2017–18	2018–19	2019–20	2020–21	2021–22	2022–23	2023–24	2024–25
Entries and exits	349	264	307	213	200	272	378	376	410	506	472	366	312	418	342	324	0	162	170	260	230

The statistics cover twelve month periods that start in April.

== Services ==
There are four trains per day to Mallaig on Monday to Saturday, and three trains on Sunday. In the opposite direction, there are three through trains per day to Glasgow Queen Street (via Fort William) and one train per day to Fort William with a connecting train to Glasgow, Edinburgh and London Euston. On Sunday there are two Glasgow trains and one to Fort William.

Preceding station	National Rail	Following station
Lochailort	ScotRail; West Highland Line	Arisaig
	Historical railways	
Lochailort; Line and Station open	North British Railway; Mallaig Extension Railway of West Highland Railway	Arisaig; Line and Station open

== Bibliography ==
- Brailsford, Martyn, ed. (December 2017) [1987]. Railway Track Diagrams 1: Scotland & Isle of Man (6th ed.). Frome: Trackmaps. ISBN 978-0-9549866-9-8.
- Butt, R. V. J. (October 1995). The Directory of Railway Stations: details every public and private passenger station, halt, platform and stopping place, past and present (1st ed.). Sparkford: Patrick Stephens Ltd. ISBN 978-1-85260-508-7. OCLC 60251199. OL 11956311M.
- Quick, Michael (2022). Railway Passenger Stations in Great Britain: A Chronology (PDF) (5th ed.). London: Railway and Canal Historical Society. Archived from the original (PDF) on 15 March 2023.
- Wills, Dixe (2014). Tiny Stations (Paperback, 1st reprint ed.). Basingstoke: AA Publishing. ISBN 978-0-7495-7732-2.
