= The Jacobite (steam train) =

Train operating in Scotland

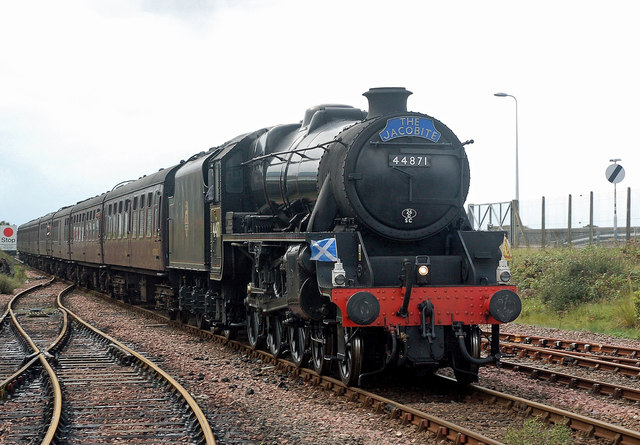
- The Jacobite arriving at Mallaig railway station

Overview
- First service: 1984
- Current operator: West Coast Railways

Route
- Termini: Fort William; Mallaig
- Stops: Glenfinnan
- Distance travelled: 41 mi (66 km)
- Average journey time: 6 hours
- Service frequency: 2 round trip services per day from April through October
- Line used: West Highland Line

Technical
- Rolling stock: Mark I carriages

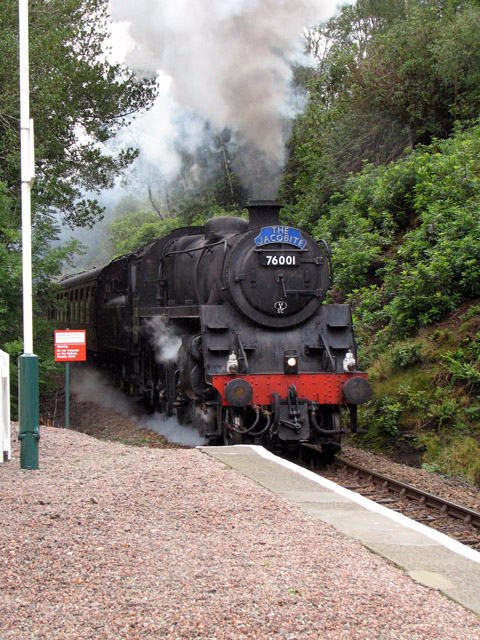
The Jacobite approaching Beasdale station

The Jacobite is a steam locomotive-hauled tourist train service that operates over part of the West Highland Line in Scotland. It has been operating under various names and with different operators every summer since 1984.

== History ==
The Mallaig Extension of the West Highland Line opened in 1901 and was operated by the North British Railway. It was intended to help open up this rural and remote part of the Scottish Atlantic coast, and the building of the line was heavily subsidised by the British Government. It became part of the London and North Eastern Railway at the Grouping in 1923, and British Railways at Nationalisation in 1948.

Regular steam services over the West Highland Line were withdrawn in 1967, in line with the British Rail Modernisation Plan which outlined the replacement of all steam locomotives with more efficient and reliable diesel locomotives.

In 1984, ScotRail re-introduced a steam-hauled service over part of the line, in an effort to encourage tourism and boost income on the heavily subsidised line. Called the West Highlander, it proved successful and continued in subsequent years. It was later renamed The Lochaber.

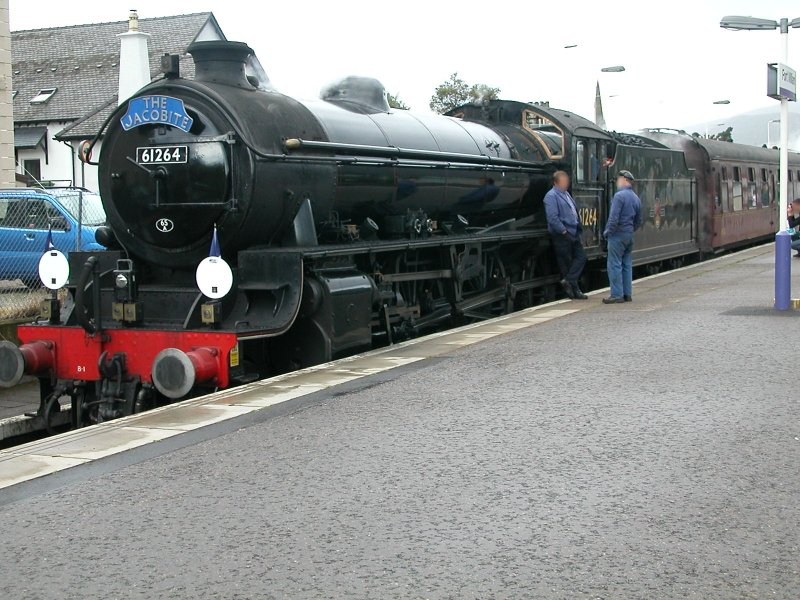
The Jacobite at Fort William station

In 1995 following the privatisation of British Rail, the operating licence for the West Highlander trains was granted to West Coast Railways (WCR), and they began operating the service that summer under the new name of The Jacobite (after the historic Jacobite political movement which has many local connections).

The daily service departs Fort William at 10:15 and arrives at Mallaig at 12:25. The return from Mallaig departs at 14:10 arriving back into Fort William at 16:00. The service crosses the additional afternoon train at Glenfinnan on Mondays to Fridays and this is the only regular crossing of two steam services passing each other on the national network.

In 2011, for the first time, WCR added a second daily The Jacobite from Fort William to Mallaig due to demand, using Ian Riley's Black 5 44871 and a spare set of coaches that were formerly used for The Cambrian. The additional service departs Fort William at 14:30 with an arrival time back in Fort William of 20:30 and runs from June to August, Monday to Friday.

The future of The Jacobite was thrown into doubt in 2015 by the complete suspension of West Coast Railways' train operating company licence. The ban was lifted on 8 May 2015, allowing the service to resume. West Coast Railway were banned again between February and March 2016.

The railway resumed service later, but due to safety concerns it was suspended again in July 2023, with passengers offered full refunds. Another suspension of service occurred in March 2024, with West Coast Railways attempting to seek exemption from the Office of Rail and Road from a requirement to install a central locking system in its carriages. The service suspension caused complaints from the local community due to the economic impact caused by the reduction of tourists visiting the region. Competing excursion train company Locomotive Services Limited ran "The West Highlander" excursion as a trial run in April 2024 over the Jacobite's route from Fort William to Mallaig while the West Coast Railway operation was shut down. Shortly afterwards, West Coast Railways announced a return to service in April 2024 using modern coaching stock as a stopgap measure. The modern carriages proved unpopular and expensive to run, requiring a diesel locomotive to be attached to the rear of the train to power their air conditioning. In April 2026 West Coast postponed the start of the service while it sought permission to instead operate the old rolling stock while installing install central locking over a period of years.

== Route ==
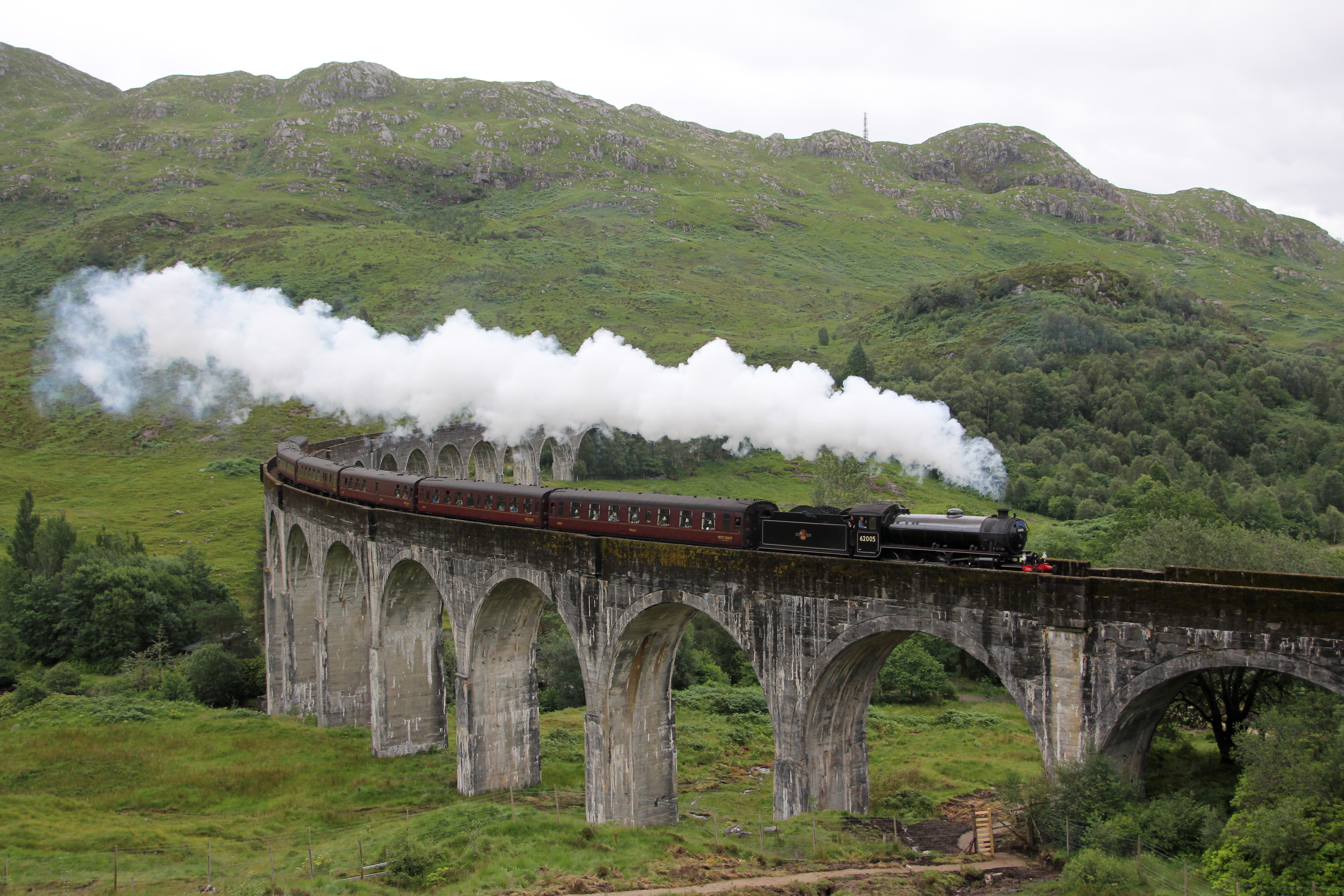
The Jacobite crossing Glenfinnan Viaduct

The Jacobite runs a distance of 41 miles (66 km) between Fort William and Mallaig, passing through an area of great scenic beauty including alongside Loch Eil, Glenfinnan Viaduct and Arisaig. Trains cross with regular service trains at Glenfinnan station.

The route is also the same shown in the Harry Potter films. The company running The Jacobite provided Warner Brothers with the train used as the Hogwarts Express in all of the films and allowed them use of the route of The Jacobite for filming. The locomotive used to pull the Hogwarts Express in the films, the GWR 4900 Class 5972 Olton Hall, is presently located at Warner Bros. Studio Tour London - The Making of Harry Potter and can be seen during studio tours.

== Locomotives and rolling stock ==
=== Steam locomotives ===
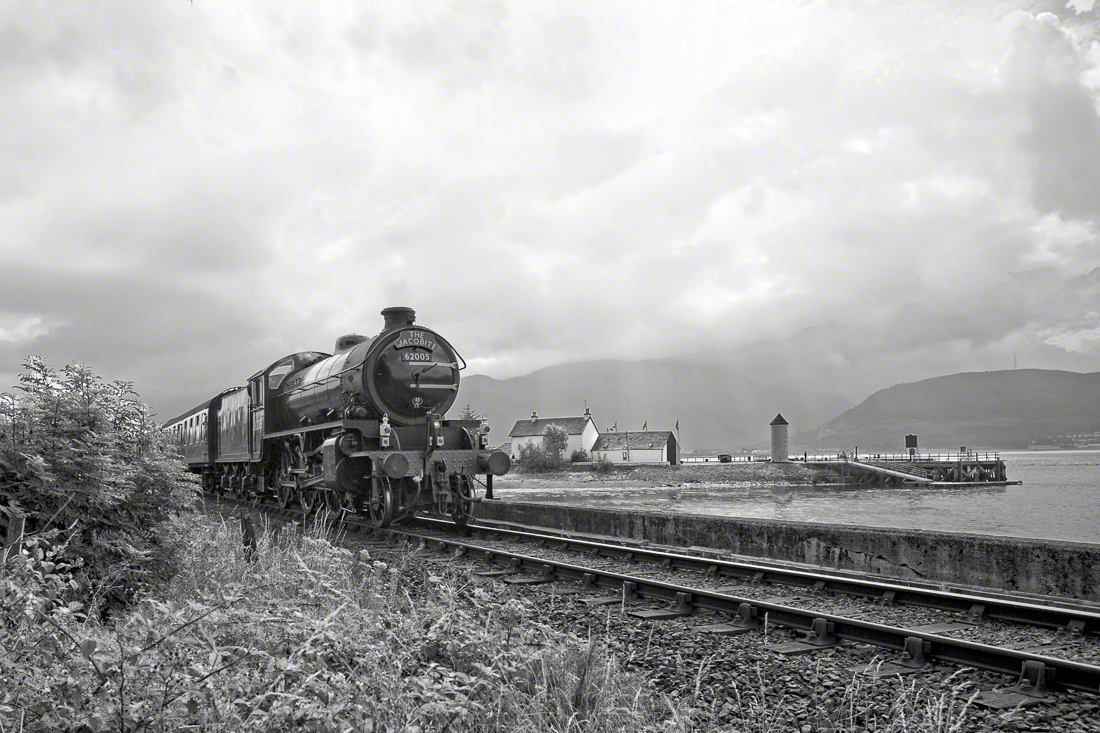
The Jacobite, headed by 62005 Lord of the Isles, passes the Corpach Sea Lock

Various steam locomotives have been used to haul the service over the years, mostly of types that would have been used on the route in pre-1967 steam days, including:

- 61994 The Great Marquess; designed specially for the route in the 1930s.
- LNER Peppercorn Class K1 2-6-0 No. 62005 Lord of the Isles; a 1940s development of the K4 design.
- LMS Stanier Class 5 4-6-0; known as the "Black Fives".

=== Carriages ===
The carriages have all been of the British Railways Mark 1 type, initially owned by British Rail and painted blue and grey, but now owned by WCR and painted in an approximation of British Rail Maroon with vacuum brakes. For the afternoon service an air braked set of British Railways Mark 2 carriages are also based in Fort William.

== In popular culture ==
A tune that takes its name from this line, Steam Train to Mallaig, was composed by Mary-Ann MacKinnon in 1993, and is extensively played by the Royal Scots Dragoon Guards pipe band, including on their album Highland Cathedral.

== See also ==
- Belmond Royal Scotsman

== Sources ==
- http://www.westcoastrailways.co.uk/jacobite/Jacobite_Details.html#
- http://guide.visitscotland.com/vs/guide/5,en,SCH1/objectId,SIG48292Svs,curr,GBP,season,at1,selectedEntry,home/home.html
- http://www.railbrit.co.uk/Mallaig_Extension_Railway/frame.htm
