= Lochailort railway station =

Railway station in the Highlands of Scotland

Lochailort Scottish Gaelic: Loch Ailleart
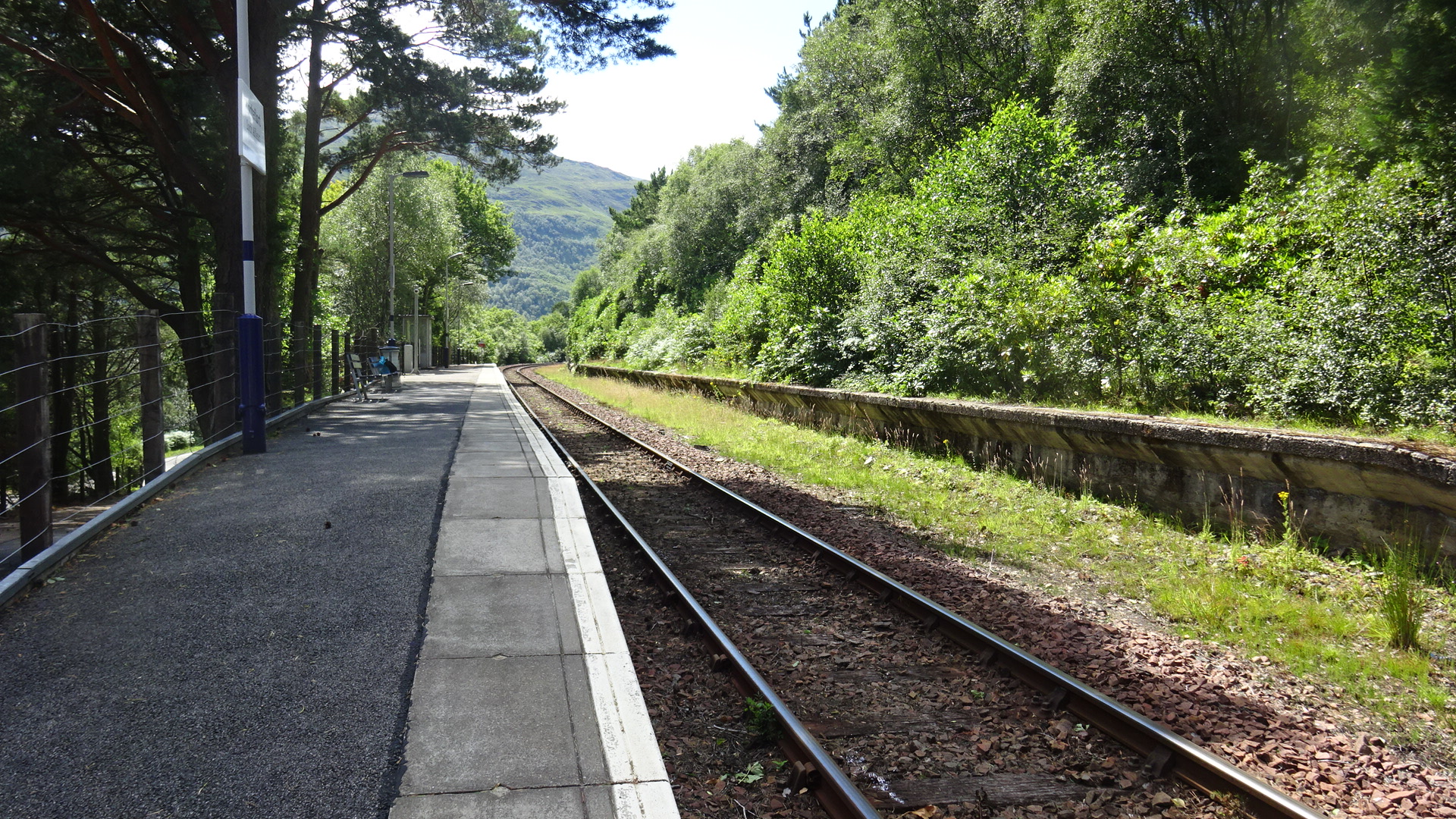
- Looking towards Mallaig

General information
- Location: Lochailort, Highland; Scotland
- Coordinates: 56.8814°N 5.6634°W
- Grid reference: NM768826
- Manager: ScotRail
- Platforms: 1

Other information
- Station code: LCL

History
- Original company: Mallaig Extension Railway of West Highland Railway
- Pre-grouping: North British Railway
- Post-grouping: LNER

Key dates
- 1 April 1901: Station opened

Passengers
- 2021/22: ▲1,116
- 2022/23: ▲1,220
- 2023/24: ▲2,104
- 2024/25: ▲2,438
- 2025/26: ▼2,084
Location
Notes
- Passenger statistics from the Office of Rail and Road

Lochailort railway station is a railway station serving the village of Lochailort in the Highland Council area in Scotland. This station is on the West Highland Line, between Glenfinnan and Beasdale, 28 miles 49 chains (46.0 km) from the former Banavie Junction. ScotRail manage the station and operate all services.

== History ==
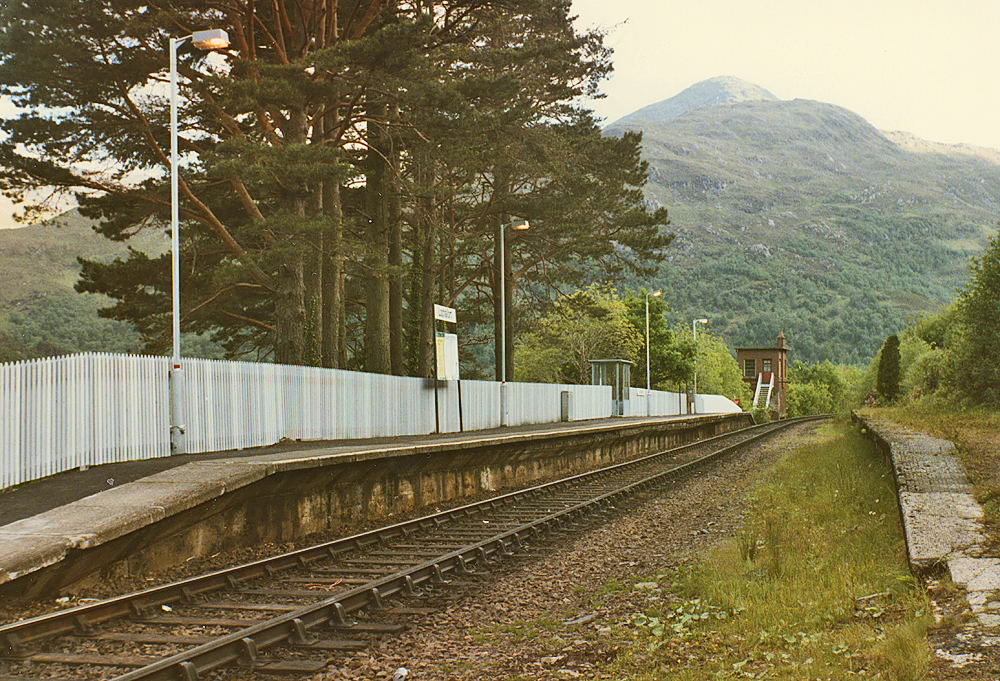
The station seen in 1984

Lochailort station was opened on 1 April 1901 when the Mallaig Extension Railway opened.

The station was constructed with two platforms and was an electric token block post.The loops were lengthened during the Second World War and a new brick signal box erected, the foundations of which now can still be seen at the Arisaig end of the single platform now in use. The second platform fell into disuse in the 1970s.

A camping coach was positioned here by the Scottish Region from 1960 to 1965, the first year a standard camping coach was used, then it was replaced with a Pullman camping coach.

== Facilities ==
The facilities here are very basic, consisting of just a shelter, a bench, a help point, some bike racks and a small car park. The station is step-free. As there are no facilities to purchase tickets, passengers must buy one in advance, or from the guard on the train.

== Passenger volume ==
Passenger Volume at Lochailort
	2004–05	2005–06	2006–07	2007–08	2008–09	2009–10	2010–11	2011–12	2012–13	2013–14	2014–15	2015–16	2016–17	2017–18	2018–19	2019–20	2020–21	2021–22	2022–23	2023–24	2024–25
Entries and exits	1,802	1,888	1,592	1,621	1,658	2,102	2,146	2,830	2,830	2,186	1,960	1,706	1,696	1,844	1,546	1,586	254	1,116	1,220	2,104	2,438

The statistics cover twelve month periods that start in April.

== Services ==
Four services call here on request each way on weekdays and Saturdays, and three each way on Sundays. These are mostly through trains between Mallaig and Glasgow Queen Street, through one each way only runs between Mallaig and Fort William.

Preceding station	National Rail	Following station
Glenfinnan	ScotRail; West Highland Line	Beasdale
	Historical railways	
Glenfinnan; Line and Station open	North British Railway; Mallaig Extension Railway of West Highland Railway	Beasdale; Line and Station open

== Bibliography ==
- Brailsford, Martyn, ed. (December 2017) [1987]. Railway Track Diagrams 1: Scotland & Isle of Man (6th ed.). Frome: Trackmaps. ISBN 978-0-9549866-9-8.
- Butt, R. V. J. (October 1995). The Directory of Railway Stations: details every public and private passenger station, halt, platform and stopping place, past and present (1st ed.). Sparkford: Patrick Stephens Ltd. ISBN 978-1-85260-508-7. OCLC 60251199. OL 11956311M.
- McRae, Andrew (1998). British Railways Camping Coach Holidays: A Tour of Britain in the 1950s and 1960s. Vol. Scenes from the Past: 30 (Part Two). Foxline. ISBN 1-870119-53-3.
- Thomas, John; Turnock, David (1989). A Regional History of the Railways of Great Britain. Vol. 15 The North of Scotland (1st ed.). Newton Abbott, Devon: David & Charles. ISBN 0-946537-03-8.
- Jowett, Alan (March 1989). Jowett's Railway Atlas of Great Britain and Ireland: From Pre-Grouping to the Present Day (1st ed.). Sparkford: Patrick Stephens Ltd. ISBN 978-1-85260-086-0. OCLC 22311137.
- Jowett, Alan (2000). Jowett's Nationalised Railway Atlas (1st ed.). Penryn, Cornwall: Atlantic Transport Publishers. ISBN 978-0-906899-99-1. OCLC 228266687.
