= Beasdale =

Beasdale may refer to:

- Glen Beasdale, a glen in the Highland region of Scotland
- Beasdale railway station, serving the glen
