= West Highland Line =

Railway line in Scotland

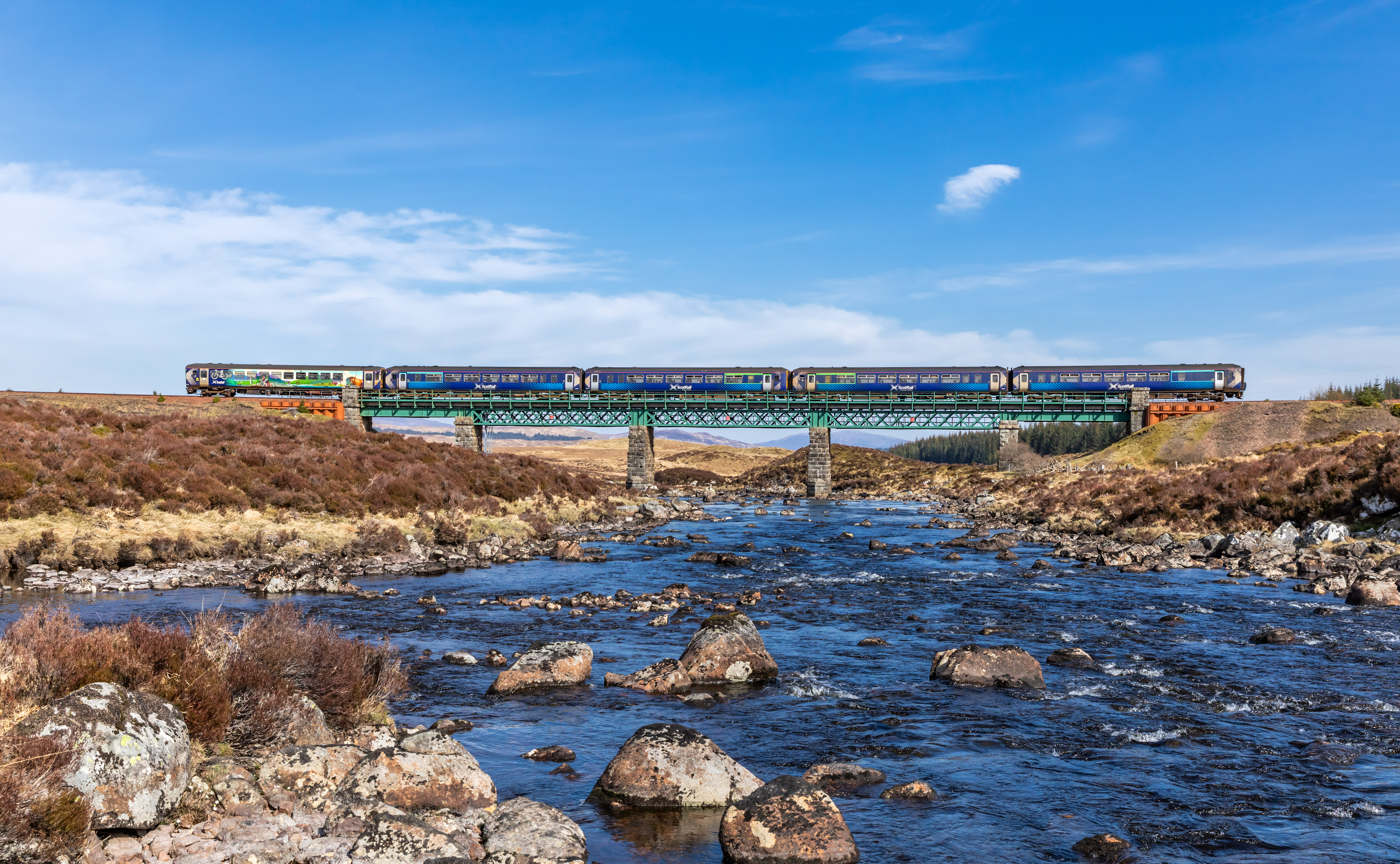
- A ScotRail Class 153 and Class 156 consist on the Gaur Viaduct in April 2025

Overview
- Status: Operational
- Owner: Network Rail
- Locale: Glasgow; Argyll and Bute; Highland
- Termini: Glasgow Queen Street; Mallaig; Oban
- Stations: 33

Service
- Type: Rural Rail
- System: National Rail
- Operators: Caledonian Sleeper; ScotRail; West Coast Railways
- Rolling stock: Class 153; Class 156; Caledonian Sleeper stock

Technical
- Line length: Glasgow Queen Street to Crianlarich: 59 miles 22 chains (95.4 km); Crianlarich to Oban: 41 miles 73 chains (67.5 km); Crianlarich to Fort William: 63 miles 14 chains (101.7 km); Fort William to Mallaig: 41 miles 28 chains (66.5 km); Total (including reversing at Fort William): 205 miles 57 chains (331.1 km)
- Number of tracks: Single-track
- Track gauge: 1,435 mm (4 ft 8 1/2 in)
- Operating speed: 70 mph (110 km/h) maximum
Route map
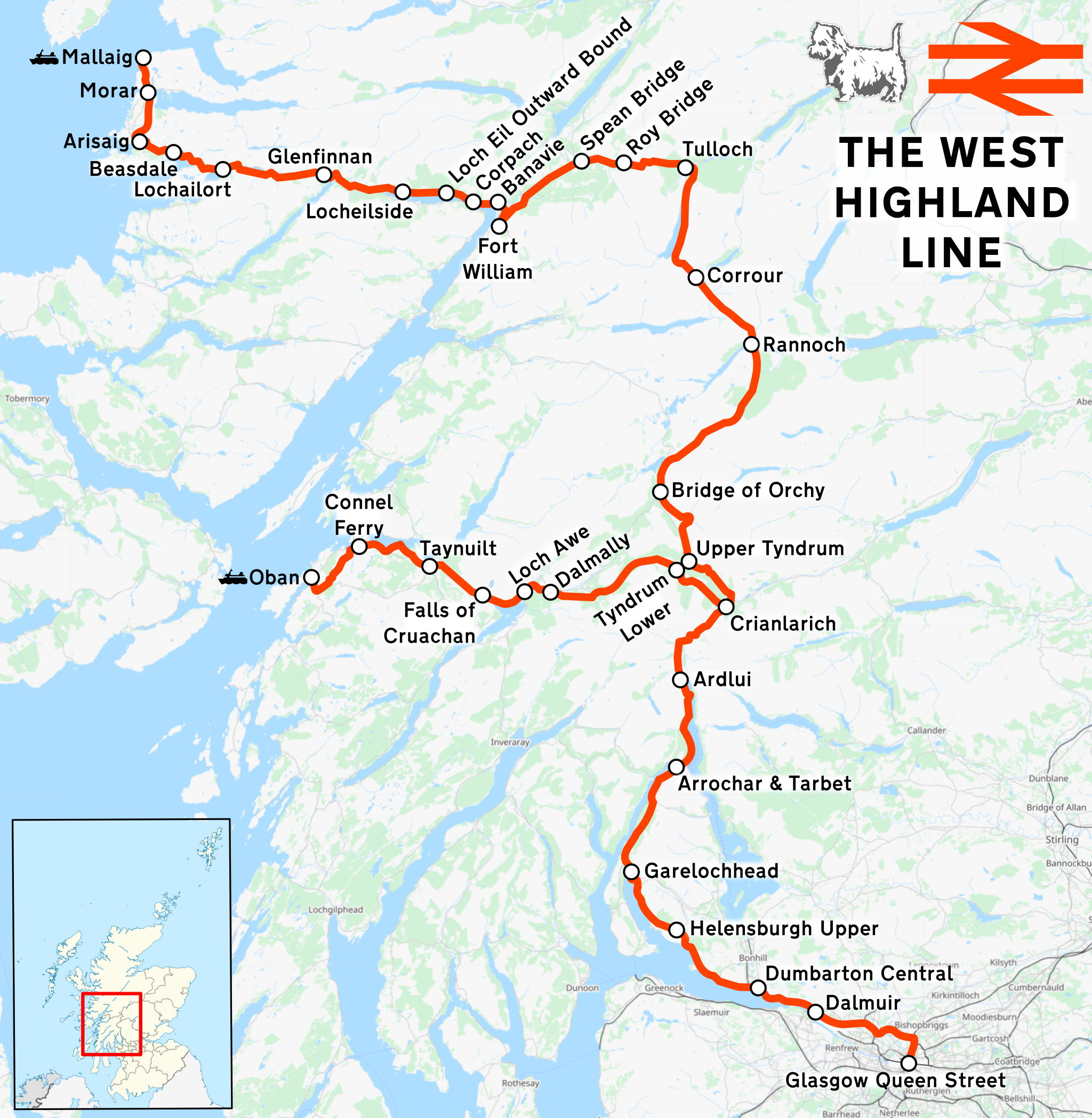
(Click to expand)

The West Highland Line (Scottish Gaelic: Rathad Iarainn nan Eilean – "Iron Road to the Isles") is a railway line linking the ports of Mallaig and Oban in the Scottish Highlands to Glasgow in Central Scotland. The line was voted the top rail journey in the world by readers of independent travel magazine Wanderlust in 2009, ahead of the notable Trans-Siberian line in Russia and the Cuzco to Machu Picchu line in Peru. The ScotRail website has since reported that the line has been voted the most scenic railway line in the world for the second year running.

The West Highland Line is one of two railway lines that access the remote and mountainous west coast of Scotland, the other being the Kyle of Lochalsh Line which connects Inverness with Kyle of Lochalsh. The line is the westernmost railway line in Great Britain.

At least in part, the West Highland Line is the same railway line as that referred to as the West Highland Railway.

== History ==
The route was built in several sections:

- Glasgow Queen Street to Cowlairs Junction - Edinburgh and Glasgow Railway
- Cowlairs Junction to Bowling - Glasgow, Dumbarton and Helensburgh Railway (later absorbed into the Edinburgh and Glasgow Railway)
- Bowling to Dumbarton Central - Lanarkshire and Dumbartonshire Railway, operated by the Caledonian Railway
- Dumbarton Central to Dalreoch - Caledonian and Dumbartonshire Junction Railway
- Dalreoch to Craigendoran - Glasgow, Dumbarton and Helensburgh Railway
- Craigendoran to Fort William (opened 11 August 1894) - West Highland Railway sponsored by the North British Railway
- Crianlarich to Oban - Callander and Oban Railway, operated by the Caledonian Railway.

There is an additional section from Fort William (or a junction near Fort William) to Mallaig, built as the Mallaig Extension Railway. The West Highland Railway approved the construction of the line at their annual meeting in January 1895.

The line faced potential closure as part of the Beeching cuts in 1963 and again in 1995 due to reduced revenues.

== Route description ==
Shortly after leaving Glasgow Queen Street station, and beyond Queen Street Tunnel, the line diverges from the main trunk route to Edinburgh Waverley and Perth at Cowlairs and follows a northwesterly course through the suburbs of Maryhill and Kelvindale. Between Westerton and Dumbarton, the route is shared with the North Clyde Line to Helensburgh Central before branching northward at Craigendoran Junction towards Garelochhead, the section where the West Highland Line itself is generally accepted to begin. It gives high-level views of the Gare Loch and Loch Long before emerging alongside the northwesterly shores of Loch Lomond, then climbs Glen Falloch to Crianlarich.

A Glasgow-bound train at Helensburgh Upper in 2020

The branch to Oban diverges at Crianlarich, an important Highland junction of both road and rail, and runs through Glen Lochy to Dalmally and through the Pass of Brander to reach salt water at Taynuilt and Connel Ferry before a final climb over a hill to Oban. About three miles (five kilometres) from Crianlarich, the Mallaig and Oban routes both pass through the village of Tyndrum, but they are served by separate stations, making it an unusually small settlement to be served by more than one railway station.

After Bridge of Orchy, the line to Mallaig climbs onto Rannoch Moor, past the former crossing point at Gorton Crossing to Rannoch station. In winter, the moor is often covered with snow, (Note: After a particularly heavy snowfall in January 1895, the snow was so heavy as to require 20-foot-deep (6 m) cuttings to allow passage on the line.) and deer may be seen running from the approaching train. The station at Corrour on the moor is one of the most remote stations in Britain and is not accessible by any public road. This is the summit of the line at 1347 ft (410 m) above sea level. Carrying on northwards, the line descends above the shores of Loch Treig and through the narrow Monessie Gorge. The final stop before Fort William is Spean Bridge. The section between Fort William and Mallaig passes over the Glenfinnan Viaduct, through Arisaig with its views of the Small Isles of Rùm, Eigg, Muck and Canna, and the white sands of Morar before coming to Mallaig itself.

With the exception of the route between Glasgow Queen Street and Helensburgh Upper, and the short section between Fort William Junction and Fort William station, the railway is signalled using the Radio Electronic Token Block, controlled from the signal box at Banavie station.

== Services ==
Passenger services on the line are operated by ScotRail and Caledonian Sleeper. As of December 2025, the service pattern is as follows:

- 3tpd each way Mallaig - Glasgow Queen Street
- 1tpd each way Mallaig - Fort William
- 1tpd Oban - Dalmally
- 6tpd each way Oban - Glasgow Queen Street. Additionally, 1tpd Glasgow Queen Street - Oban (one way only)

All of the services from Glasgow Queen Street - Mallaig are combined with services to Oban, splitting at Crianlarich. Similarly, two of the return services combine at Crianlarich.

During the summer season from May until October a steam locomotive-hauled daily return service between Fort William and Mallaig known as The Jacobite is operated by West Coast Railways. There is one train a day in May, September and October, and two trains per day from June until the end of August.

Caledonian Sleeper operates a nightly service (except Saturday) from Fort William to London Euston, with northbound services also 6 nights per week.

Onward ferry connections operated by Caledonian MacBrayne are available from Mallaig to the Isle of Skye, to the small isles of Rùm, Eigg, Muck, and Canna, to South Uist, and to Inverie on the Knoydart peninsula. From Oban ferries sail to the islands of Lismore, Colonsay, Coll, Tiree, Mull and Barra.

As of 2021, there is a single regular freight operation on the line, consisting of alumina services from North Blyth to a smelter near Fort William.

== Route timings ==
Since improvements to Scottish trunk roads in the 1980s, a train journey can take significantly longer than the equivalent road journey. There are several reasons for this. The line is entirely single track once it leaves the North Clyde suburban network at Craigendoran and trains must wait at stations with crossing loops for opposite direction trains to pass. Even when no crossing is timetabled, each train must pause at various token exchange points whilst the driver contacts the main signalling centre at Banavie to swap tokens electronically and obtain permission to proceed. Up to 15 minutes have to be allocated for trains to divide or combine at the junction station at Crianlarich, whilst trains heading to/from Mallaig also have to reverse at Fort William & traverse the Banavie swing bridge at low speed. A further issue is finding suitable timetable paths for Oban & Mallaig trains on the busy North Clyde line, which carries an intensive local stopping service. As West Highland trains only stop at Dumbarton Central and Dalmuir on this stretch, it is not uncommon for them be delayed by a preceding local train and so recovery time has to be included in their schedules to reduce the possibility of a late arrival in Glasgow.

Over much of the Rannoch Moor section the speed limit is 60 mph (95 km/h) for the Sprinter and 70 mph (110 km/h) on the approach to Rannoch station. The Caledonian Sleeper travels at 40 mph (65 km/h) maximum, slowing down for a number of bridges on the route due to the heavy weight of the Class 67 locomotive which hauled the train until the end of the old franchise in April 2015. The operator of the sleeper Serco has replaced these with refurbished Class 73/9 electro-diesels since it took over, which have a lighter axle load; it is not yet clear whether the new locomotives will be cleared to run at higher speeds now they are in service.

== Rolling stock ==
Past, present and future rolling stock on the line
Class	Image	Operator	Route	Maximum speed		Builder/Built	In service on the line	Leased from	Notes
Class	Image	Operator	Route	mph	km/h	Builder/Built	In service on the line	Leased from	Notes
Past rolling stock (from 1980)
Class 37		British Rail (Until 1983); BR ScotRail (From 1983)	Glasgow Queen Street to Oban/Mallaig (Until 1989); London Euston to Fort William (Takes over from electric loco at Edinburgh); Freight	80	130	English Electric; 1960-1965	1981-1985	N/A	Class 37/0
Class 37		BR ScotRail	Glasgow Queen Street to Oban/Mallaig (Until 1989); London Euston to Fort William (Takes over from electric loco at Edinburgh); Freight	90	145	English Electric; 1960-1965	1985-2006	N/A	Class 37/4
BR Standard Class 4 2-6-0		West Coast Railways	Fort William to Mallaig	60	96	Horwich Works 1957			The Jacobite
LNER Class K4 2-6-0		West Coast Railways	Fort William to Mallaig	60	96	Darlington Works 1938			The Jacobite
Mark 1 Passenger Coach		British Rail (Until 1983); BR ScotRail (From 1983); Royal Scotsman (1985 - 1989)	Glasgow Queen Street to Oban or Mallaig	100	160	1951-1963	1961-1989	N/A	
Mark 2 Passenger Coach		Caledonian Sleeper	London Euston to Fort William	100	160	BREL 1963-1975	1964-2019		It was replaced by the Mark 5 passenger coach.
Mark 3 Sleeper Coach		Caledonian Sleeper	London Euston to Fort William	125	200	BREL 1979-1980	1980-2019		It was replaced by the Mark 5 sleeping coach.
Current fleet
Class 66		GB Railfreight	Freight	75	120	Electro-Motive Diesel 1998-2015	2000-	N/A	Class 66/7
Class 66		Belmond Limited	Special Passenger Workings (Royal Scotsman)	75	120	Electro-Motive Diesel 1998-2015	2000-	GB Railfreight	Class 66/7
Class 67		First ScotRail (Until 2015); Caledonian Sleeper	London Euston to Fort William (Took over from electric loco at Edinburgh)	125	200	Alstom 1999-2000	2006-2016, 2023-	DB Cargo UK	
Class 73/9		First ScotRail (Until 2015); Caledonian Sleeper	London Euston to Fort William (Took over from electric loco at Edinburgh)	90	145	British Railways Eastleigh Works 1962; English Electric 1965-1967; Rebuilt 2014-2016	2016-	GB Railfreight	Replaced Class 67 when their lease from DB Cargo UK Expired Class 73/9.
Class 153		ScotRail (2021-present)	Glasgow Queen Street to Oban/Mallaig	75	120	Leyland Bus 1987-1988 as Class 155s Converted to Class 153 by Hunslet-Barclay 1991-1992	2021–	N/A	In service from 19 July
Class 156		BR ScotRail (until 1997); National Express (1997-2004); First ScotRail (2005-2015); ScotRail (2015-present)	Glasgow Queen Street to Oban/Mallaig	75	120	Metro-Cammell 1987-1989	1989–	N/A	
LMS Stanier Class 5 4-6-0		West Coast Railways	Fort William to Mallaig	60	96	Armstrong Whitworth (45212 & 45407) 1935 & 1937 Crewe Works (44871) 1945	-		The Jacobite
Peppercorn Class K1		West Coast Railways	Fort William to Mallaig	60	96	North British Locomotive Company 1949-1950	-		The Jacobite
Mark 1 Passenger coach		West Coast Railways	Fort William to Mallaig	100	160	Cravens 19511963			The Jacobite
Mark 2 Passenger Coach		West Coast Railways	Fort William to Mallaig	100	160	BREL 1963–1975			The Jacobite
Pullman Mark 3 coach	Dining car - geograph.org.uk - 892799	Belmond Limited	Special Passenger Workings (Royal Scotsman)	125	200	BREL 1979–1980			
Mark 3 Sleeper Coach		Belmond Limited	Special Passenger Workings (Royal Scotsman)	125	200	BREL 1979–1980			
Mark 5 Passenger Coach		Caledonian Sleeper	London Euston to Fort William	100	160	CAF 2016–2018	Oct 2019–	Caledonian Sleeper Rail Leasing	It replaced the Mark 2 passenger coach.
Mark 5 Sleeper Coach		Caledonian Sleeper	London Euston to Fort William	100	160	CAF 2016–2018	Oct 2019–	Caledonian Sleeper Rail Leasing	It replaced the Mark 3 sleeping coach.

In early 2018 it was widely reported that Class 158s would be used from Q3-Q4 2018 to replace the Class 156s. However, following investigation it was discovered that the line does not have sufficient gauge clearance for the class. As of August 2018 studies were still ongoing.

== Notable railway-related features ==
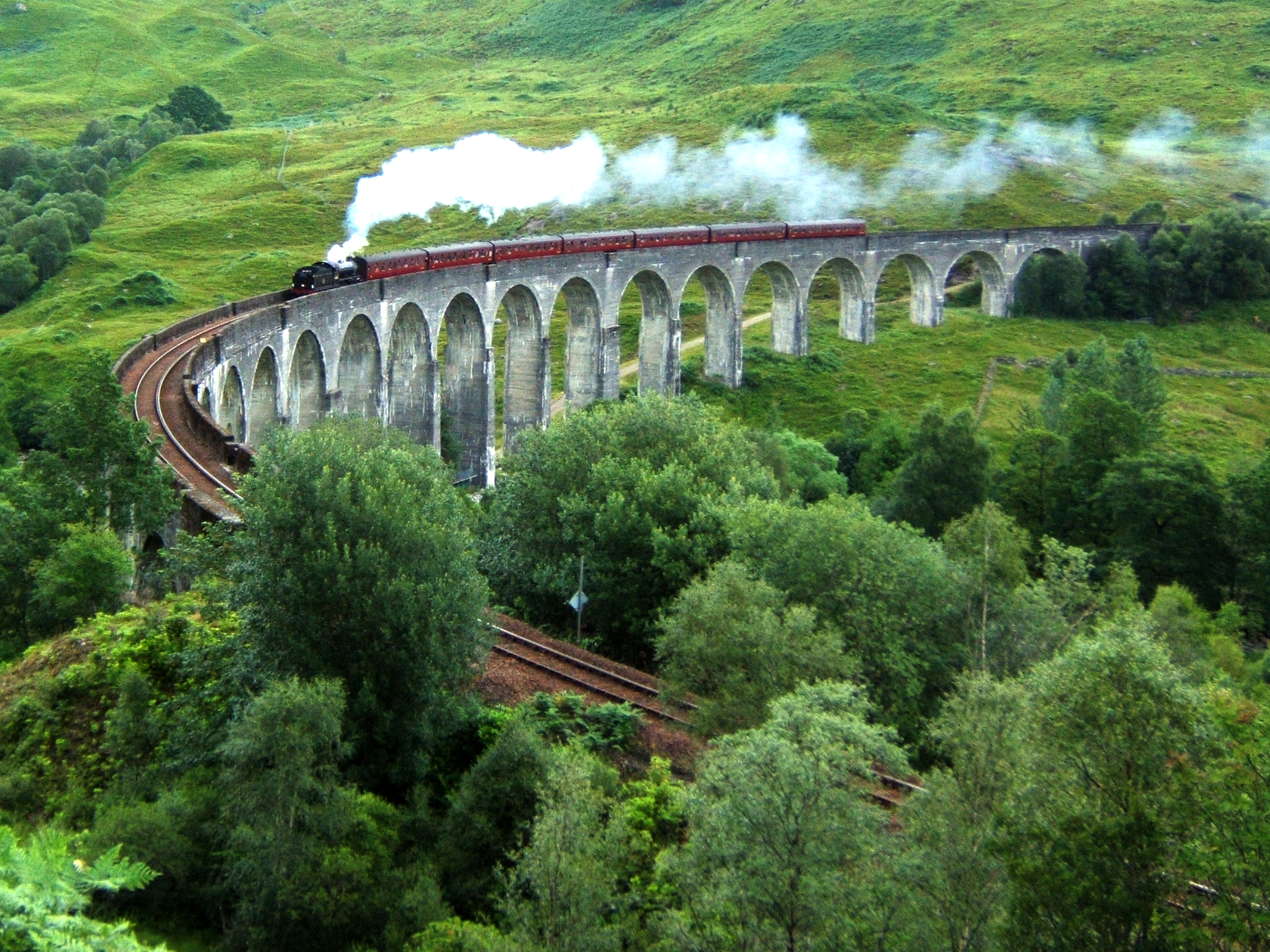
Glenfinnan Viaduct

- The Horse Shoe Curve, between Upper Tyndrum and Bridge of Orchy
- The Cruach Rock snowshed, between Rannoch and Corrour
- Glenfinnan Viaduct, between Locheilside and Glenfinnan
- The Pass of Brander stone signals, between Dalmally and Taynuilt
- Arisaig is the most westerly railway station in Great Britain
- Corrour is the highest mainline railway station in the United Kingdom

The two branches of the line are described in detail by John Thomas in his two books (see § Sources).

== Route in detail ==
Places served along the route from Glasgow Queen Street are listed below. Sleeper services to Fort William start, however, at London Euston, calling at Edinburgh Waverley and Queen Street Low Level (to pick up or set down depending on direction).

Place	Station	OS reference	Notes
Glasgow to Crianlarich
Glasgow	Glasgow Queen Street	NS592655	
Dalmuir	Dalmuir	NS484714	
Dumbarton	Dumbarton Central	NS397755	
Helensburgh	Helensburgh Upper	NS298833	
Garelochhead	Garelochhead	NS242910	
Arrochar and Tarbet	Arrochar and Tarbet	NN311045	
Ardlui	Ardlui	NN317155	Request stop for the Caledonian Sleeper.
Crianlarich	Crianlarich	NN384250	At Crianlarich the former West Highland Railway route to Fort William and Mallaig links to the remaining section of the former Callander and Oban Railway to Oban
Crianlarich to Oban
Tyndrum	Tyndrum Lower	NN327301	
Dalmally	Dalmally	NN159271	
Loch Awe	Loch Awe	NN124274	
Loch Awe	Falls of Cruachan	NN079267	Used mainly by hikers
Taynuilt	Taynuilt	NN003312	
Connel	Connel Ferry	NM916340	
Oban	Oban	NM857298	
Crianlarich to Fort William
Tyndrum	Upper Tyndrum	NN333302	
Bridge of Orchy	Bridge of Orchy	NN300394	
Rannoch	Rannoch	NN422578	
Corrour	Corrour	NN356663	Request stop for the Caledonian Sleeper
Tulloch	Tulloch	NN354802	
Roy Bridge	Roy Bridge	NN272810	Request stop for the Caledonian Sleeper
Spean Bridge	Spean Bridge	NN221814	
Fort William	Fort William	NN105741	Services from Glasgow reverse out of Fort William to continue to Mallaig. The Jacobite runs from Fort William to Mallaig.
Fort William and Mallaig route
Banavie	Banavie	NN112767	
Corpach	Corpach	NN096767	
Loch Eil	Loch Eil Outward Bound	NN054783	
Loch Eil	Locheilside	NM994786	Request stop
Glenfinnan	Glenfinnan	NM898810	
Lochailort	Lochailort	NM768826	Request stop
Beasdale	Beasdale	NM709850	Request stop
Arisaig	Arisaig	NM663867	
Morar	Morar	NM677929	
Mallaig	Mallaig	NM675970	Ferries link Mallaig to Armadale, the Isle of Skye, South Uist and the Small Isles

== West Highland Line in film ==
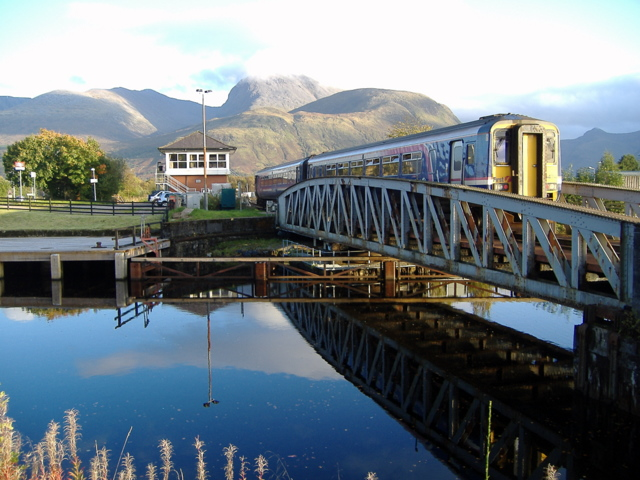
Train crossing bridge at Banavie

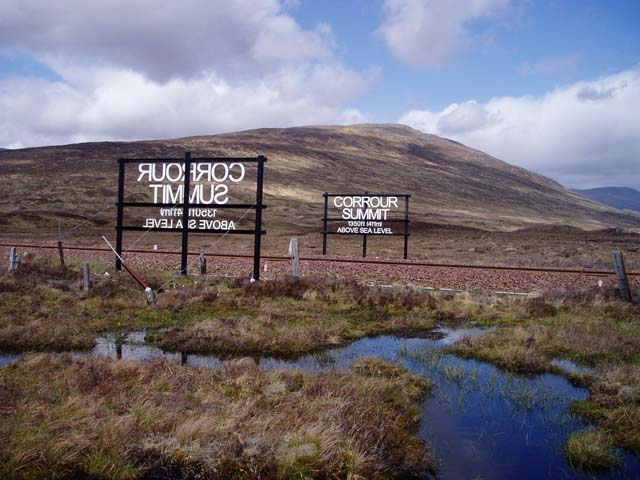
The summit of the line just north of Corrour

- Glenfinnan Viaduct, on the line between Fort William and Mallaig, is a filming location for the Hogwarts Express in the Harry Potter series of films.
- Eddie McConnell's poetic documentary A Line for All Seasons (1970) showcases the line and its history set against the scenery of the western highlands as it changes through the seasons.
- Corrour features in Trainspotting (1996), directed by Danny Boyle.

== Museum ==
There is a museum dedicated to the history of the West Highland Line situated at Glenfinnan station.

== Future ==
In the Scottish Government's National Transport Strategy, published in February 2020, it was stated that the line will not be electrified with overhead lines. Instead, an alternative to diesel traction will be found.
