= Mallaig railway station =

Railway station in the Scottish Highlands

Mallaig Scottish Gaelic: Malaig
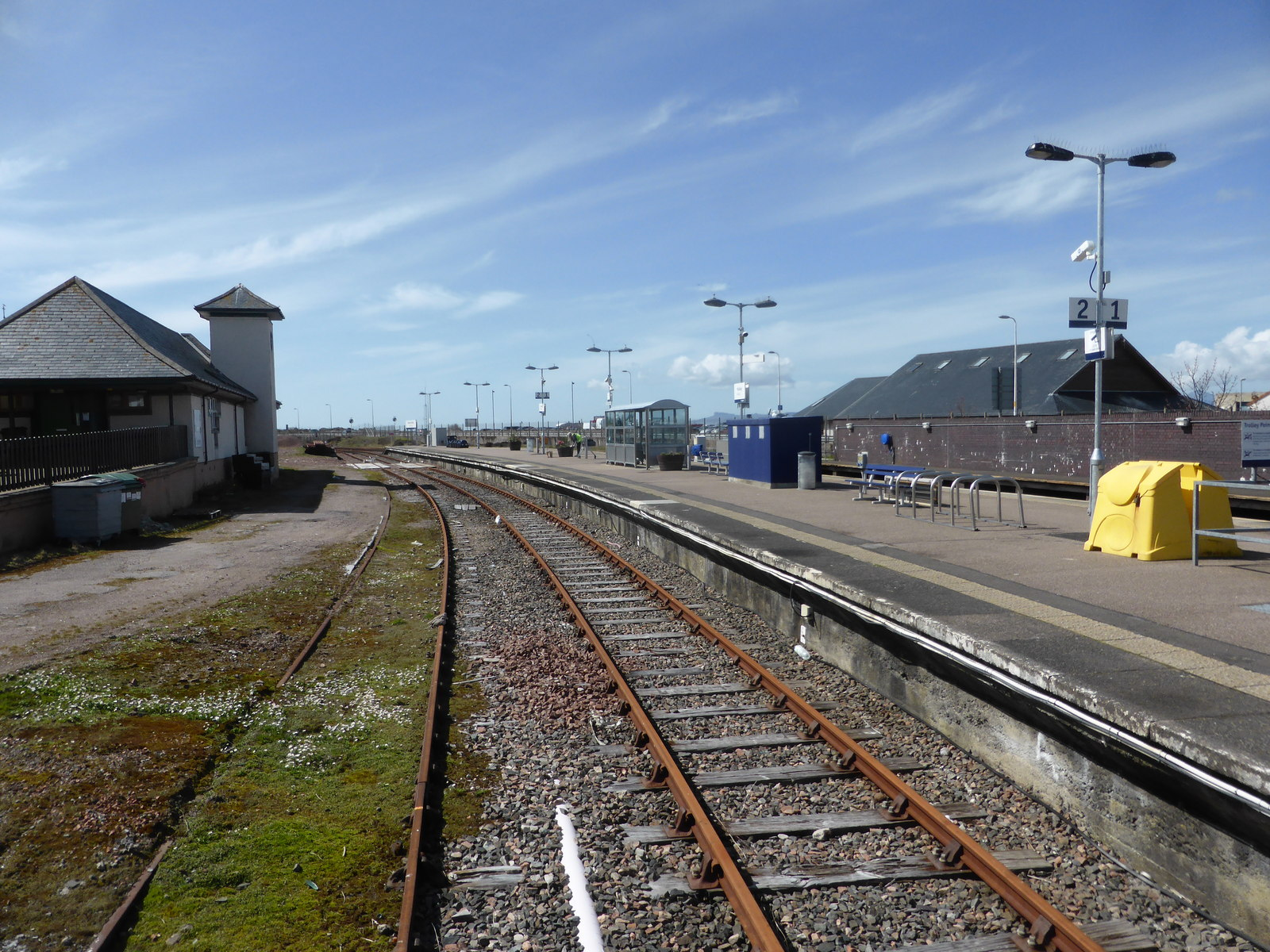

General information
- Location: Main Street, Mallaig, Highland; Scotland
- Coordinates: 57.0056°N 5.8302°W
- Grid reference: NM675970
- Manager: ScotRail
- Platforms: 2

Other information
- Station code: MLG

History
- Original company: Mallaig Extension Railway of West Highland Railway
- Pre-grouping: North British Railway
- Post-grouping: LNER

Key dates
- 1 April 1901: Station opened

Passengers
- 2021/22: ▲62,426
- 2022/23: ▲71,692
- 2023/24: ▲97,710
- 2024/25: ▼90,476
- 2025/26: ▲93,196

Listed Building – Category C(S)
- Designated: 8 August 1996
- Reference no.: LB43567
Location
Notes
- Passenger statistics from the Office of Rail and Road

Mallaig railway station is a railway station serving the ferry port of Mallaig, Lochaber, in the Highland region of Scotland. This station is a terminus on the West Highland Line, 41 miles (66 km) by rail from Fort William and 164 miles (264 km) from Glasgow Queen Street. The station building is Category C listed. ScotRail, who manage the station, operate most of the services.

== History ==
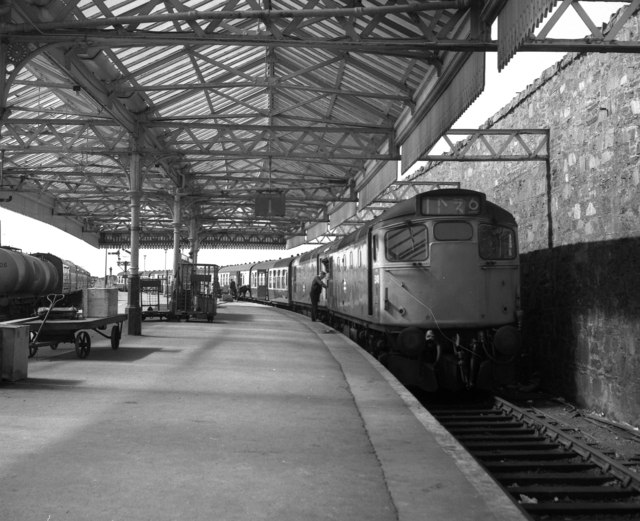
The station in 1973

Mallaig station opened on 1 April 1901.

The original proposal was to build the railway to Roshven, but the planned terminus was changed to Mallaig following opposition from local landowners.

In 1978, Lochaber divisional planning committee agreed to a proposed £34,000 extension to the station which allowed for the station to be extended in a south western direction on part of the existing platform area. The extension included permission for a permanent tourist office within the existing building, and also a parcels office, mess room and concourse.

In 1998 Railtrack announced expenditure of £90,000 to repair the station.

== Facilities ==
The station is equipped with a spacious ticket office (adjacent to the car park), inside of which is a help point and the toilets. The island platform has seats, cycle racks and luggage trolleys. The station has step-free access.

== Passenger volume ==
Passenger Volume at Mallaig
	2004–05	2005–06	2006–07	2007–08	2008–09	2009–10	2010–11	2011–12	2012–13	2013–14	2014–15	2015–16	2016–17	2017–18	2018–19	2019–20	2020–21	2021–22	2022–23	2023–24	2024–25	2025–26
Entries and exits	69,779	66,193	67,393	62,984	65,436	87,862	85,630	85,378	82,914	86,994	84,972	88,346	86,406	95,878	97,530	96,414	15,270	62,426	71,692	97,710	90,476	93,196

The statistics cover twelve month periods that start in April.

== Services ==
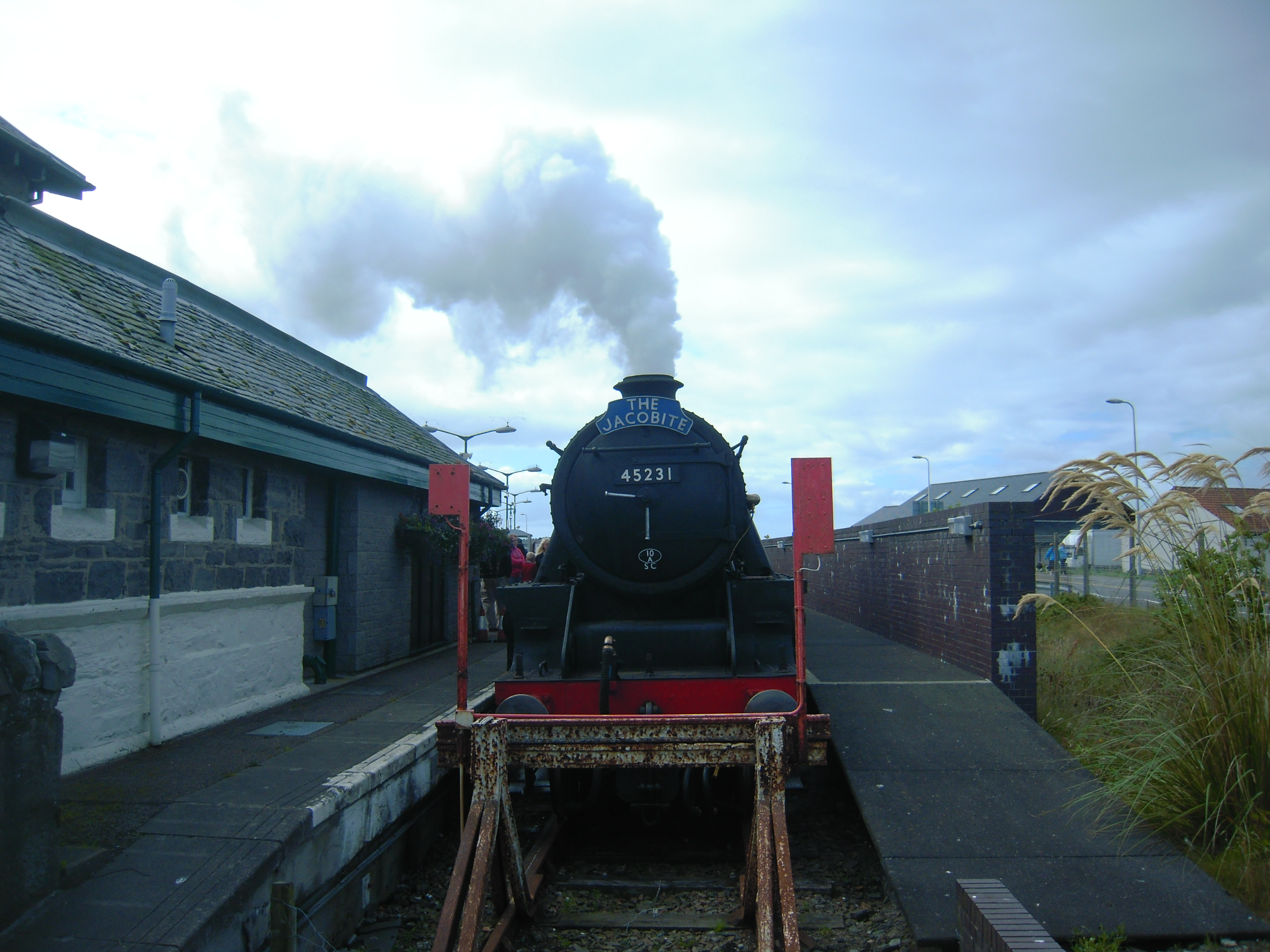
The Jacobite at Mallaig Station

The railway line from Mallaig is noted as a scenic route, especially as it passes along the Glenfinnan Viaduct 37 kilometres (23 mi) out of Mallaig.

Most scheduled train services out of Mallaig railway station are operated by ScotRail. Currently, four trains a day depart Monday to Saturdays from Mallaig for Fort William, three of which continue to Glasgow Queen Street (the fourth terminates at Fort William to connect with the Caledonian Sleeper to London Euston). On Sundays, three trains depart for Fort William, with two trains continuing on to Glasgow.

Mallaig is also the destination of a special tourist steam train operated by West Coast Railways, The Jacobite, which runs sightseeing trips non-stop to Fort William running twice daily, Monday to Friday (with additional weekend services during the summer months).

Preceding station	National Rail	Following station
Morar	ScotRail; West Highland Line	Terminus
	Heritage railways	
Fort William	West Coast Railways; The Jacobite; May–October	Terminus
	Historical railways	
Morar; Line and Station open	North British Railway; West Highland Railway (Mallaig Extension Railway)	Terminus

== Mallaig Ferry Terminal ==
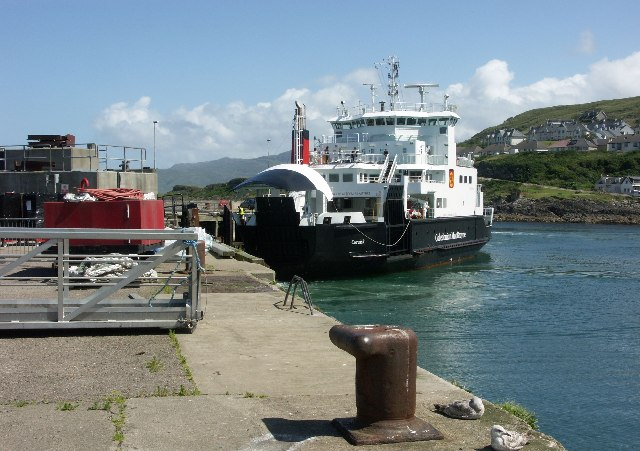
The Skye ferry at Mallaig harbour

The Ferry port is located in front of the railway station, approximately 130 metres (430 ft) away.

Caledonian MacBrayne operate ferry services from Mallaig to Armadale on the Isle of Skye, a thirty-minute sailing, as well as daily services to the Small Isles of Canna, Rùm, Eigg and Muck, although the timetable, itinerary and calling points differ from day to day. A small, independent ferry service run by former lifeboatman Bruce Watt sails up Loch Nevis to the remote village of Inverie in Knoydart.

Preceding station	National Rail	Following station
	Ferry services	
Armadale	Caledonian MacBrayne; Mallaig – Skye	Terminus
Lochboisdale	Caledonian MacBrayne; Mallaig – South Uist	Terminus
Rùm	Caledonian MacBrayne; Mallaig – Small Isles	Terminus
Eigg	Caledonian MacBrayne; Mallaig – Small Isles	Terminus
Muck	Caledonian MacBrayne; Mallaig – Small Isles	Terminus
Canna	Caledonian MacBrayne; Mallaig – Small Isles	Terminus
Inverie	Western Isles Cruises; Mallaig – Knoydart	Terminus
Inverie	Knoydart Ferry; Mallaig – Knoydart	Terminus

== See also ==
- Mallaig Extension Railway
- West Highland Railway

== Bibliography ==
- Brailsford, Martyn, ed. (December 2017) [1987]. Railway Track Diagrams 1: Scotland & Isle of Man (6th ed.). Frome: Trackmaps. ISBN 978-0-9549866-9-8.
- Butt, R. V. J. (October 1995). The Directory of Railway Stations: details every public and private passenger station, halt, platform and stopping place, past and present (1st ed.). Sparkford: Patrick Stephens Ltd. ISBN 978-1-85260-508-7. OCLC 60251199. OL 11956311M.
- Jowett, Alan (March 1989). Jowett's Railway Atlas of Great Britain and Ireland: From Pre-Grouping to the Present Day (1st ed.). Sparkford: Patrick Stephens Ltd. ISBN 978-1-85260-086-0. OCLC 22311137.
- Jowett, Alan (2000). Jowett's Nationalised Railway Atlas (1st ed.). Penryn, Cornwall: Atlantic Transport Publishers. ISBN 978-0-906899-99-1. OCLC 228266687.
