= Fort William railway station =

Railway station in the Scottish Highlands

Fort William Scottish Gaelic: An Gearasdan
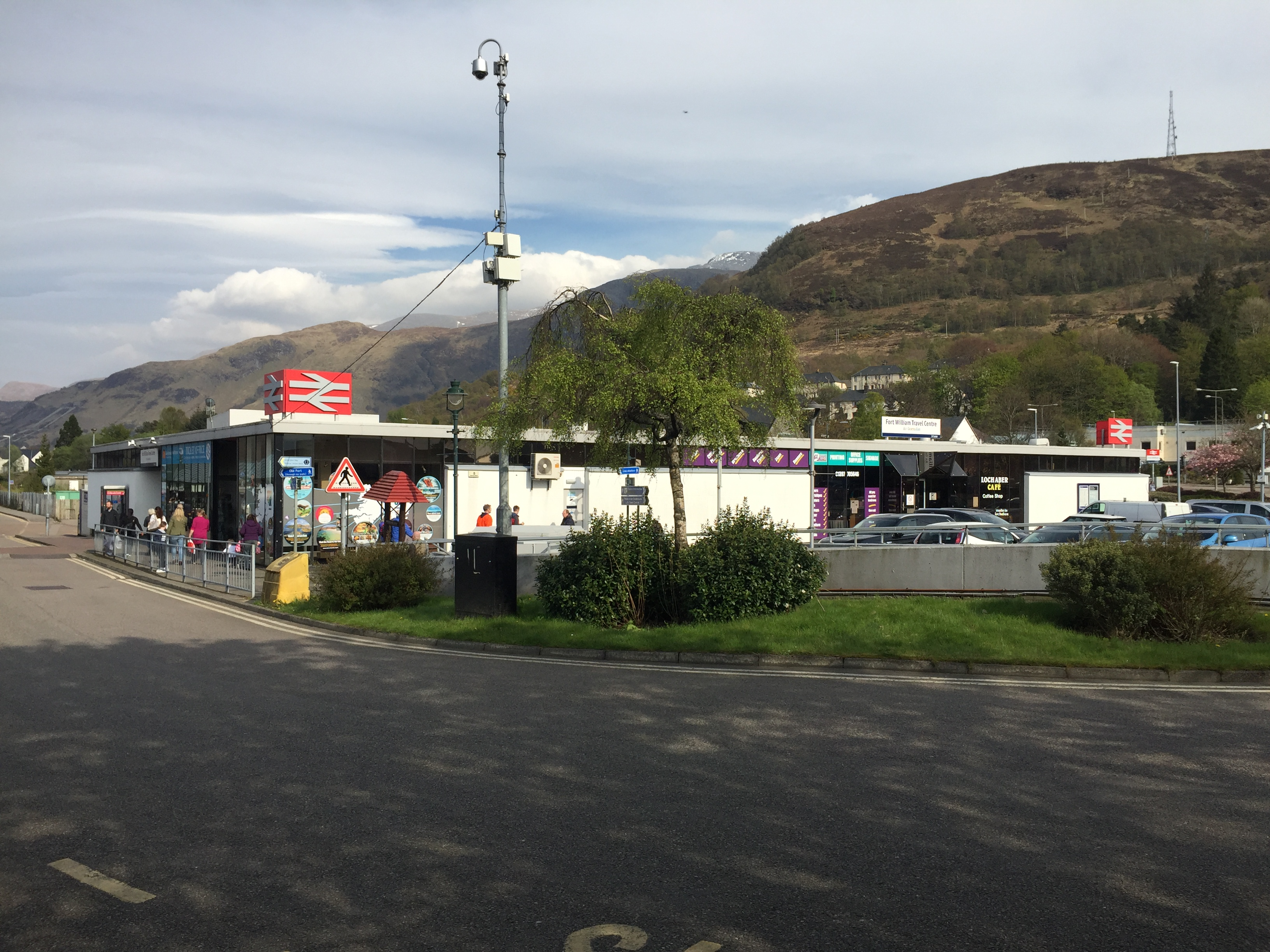
- The station entrance, 2017

General information
- Location: Fort William, Highland; Scotland
- Coordinates: 56.8207°N 5.1047°W
- Grid reference: NN105741
- Managed by: ScotRail
- Platforms: 2

Other information
- Station code: FTW

History
- Original company: British Rail

Key dates
- 7 August 1894: First station opened
- 9 June 1975: First station closed
- 13 June 1975: Present station opened

Passengers
- 2020/21: ▼22,316
- Interchange: ▼39
- 2021/22: ▲0.114 million
- Interchange: ▲197
- 2022/23: ▲0.146 million
- Interchange: ▲204
- 2023/24: ▲0.192 million
- Interchange: ▲323
- 2024/25: ▼0.176 million
- Interchange: ▼224
Location
Notes
- Passenger statistics from the Office of Rail and Road

Fort William railway station serves the town of Fort William, in the Highland region of Scotland. It is on the West Highland line, between Spean Bridge and Banavie, measured 99 miles 37 chains (160.1 km) from Craigendoran Junction, at the southern end of the line near Helensburgh. The station is managed by ScotRail, who operate most services from the station; Caledonian Sleeper and The Jacobite, an excursion operated by West Coast Railways, also use the station.

== History ==
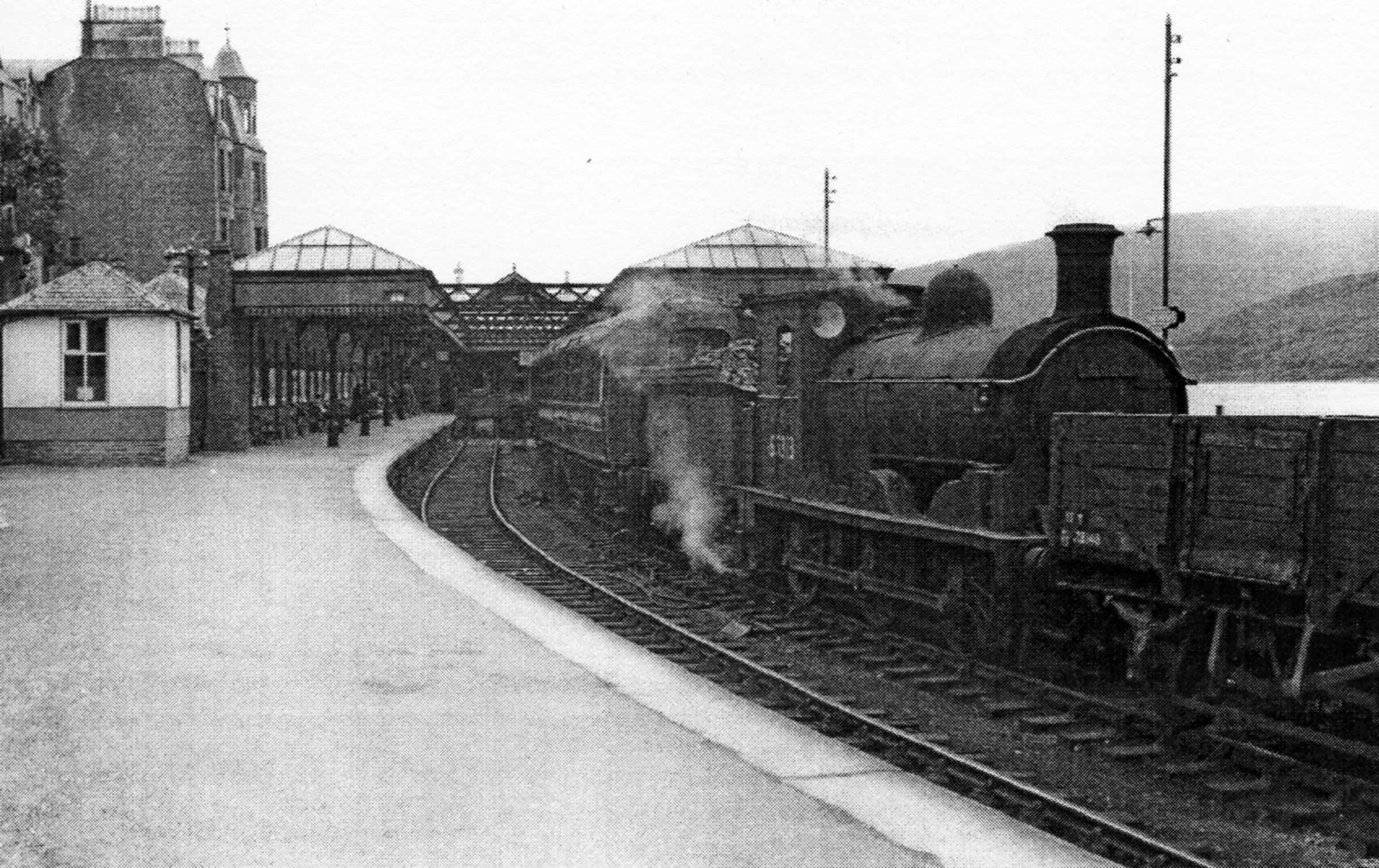
The original station in 1957

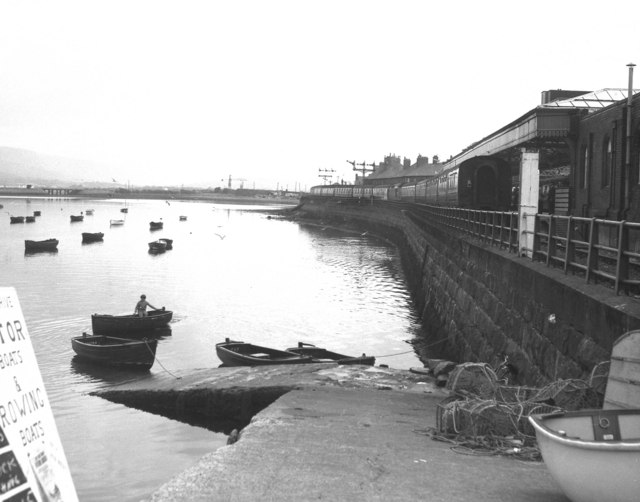
The original station alongside the loch

The first station was constructed by the West Highland Railway which was later absorbed by the North British Railway. They chose a site for the station alongside the town shipping pier, which required the purchase of a strip of the foreshore. The railway company bought this for £25 (equivalent to £2,800 in 2025) an acre. Purchase of this land displaced some people from their houses and the railway company was obliged to provide replacement housing. Other residents realised too late that the railway line cut the town off from the shore and the company responded by providing some wicket gate crossings.

It was opened by the Marchioness of Tweedale, Candida Louisa Bartolucci, wife of the chairman of the North British Railway, William Hay, 10th Marquess of Tweeddale on 7 August 1894. It was sited to the west of the present station on what is now the A82 town bypass, alongside Loch Linnhe at Station Square, at the time in close proximity to then location of the former Caledonian MacBrayne bus station. The old station was a stone built construction featuring a turret and a double arched entranceway and had three platforms. Two of the platforms terminated under the platform canopy, but the third continued past the station, crossing the MacBrayne pier and terminated at the jetty just beyond.

In 1970 the British Railways Board put forward proposals to re-site the station 700 yards (640 m) north of its location to allow the improvements to the A82 to be implemented. The last train from the old station departed on 7 June 1975 and the station closed on 9 June. It was demolished immediately afterwards to permit construction of the bypass.

The present Fort William station of grey concrete construction was opened on 13 June 1975. The current station lies in the shadow of Ben Nevis, and is used for the Three Peaks Challenge, where participants attempt to climb Snowdon, Scafell Pike and Ben Nevis in three days.

=== Accidents and incidents ===
During high winds in February 1980 a brick wall at the station collapsed onto the track and blocked a platform.

== Facilities ==
Refurbishment of the facilities at Fort William railway station was completed in 2007 thanks to a £750,000 investment. The refurbishment includes new shower facilities and refurbished toilets.

The island platform is also equipped with a few shops and restaurants, a ticket office, bike racks, a car park and a taxi rank, and some benches. All areas of the station are step-free.

A lounge for Caledonian Sleeper passengers opened in 2018.

== Passenger volume ==
Passenger Volume at Fort William
	2004–05	2005–06	2006–07	2007–08	2008–09	2009–10	2010–11	2011–12	2012–13	2013–14	2014–15	2015–16	2016–17	2017–18	2018–19	2019–20	2020–21	2021–22	2022–23	2023–24	2024–25
Entries and exits	114,211	115,417	115,510	120,333	121,920	134,302	135,488	138,870	135,556	145,504	144,106	139,808	138,514	155,856	160,418	139,722	22,316	114,230	145,564	192,078	176,226
Interchanges	212	217	192	211	247	295	365	414	458	440	387	339	355	393	414	377	39	197	204	323	224

The statistics cover twelve month periods that start in April.

== Services ==
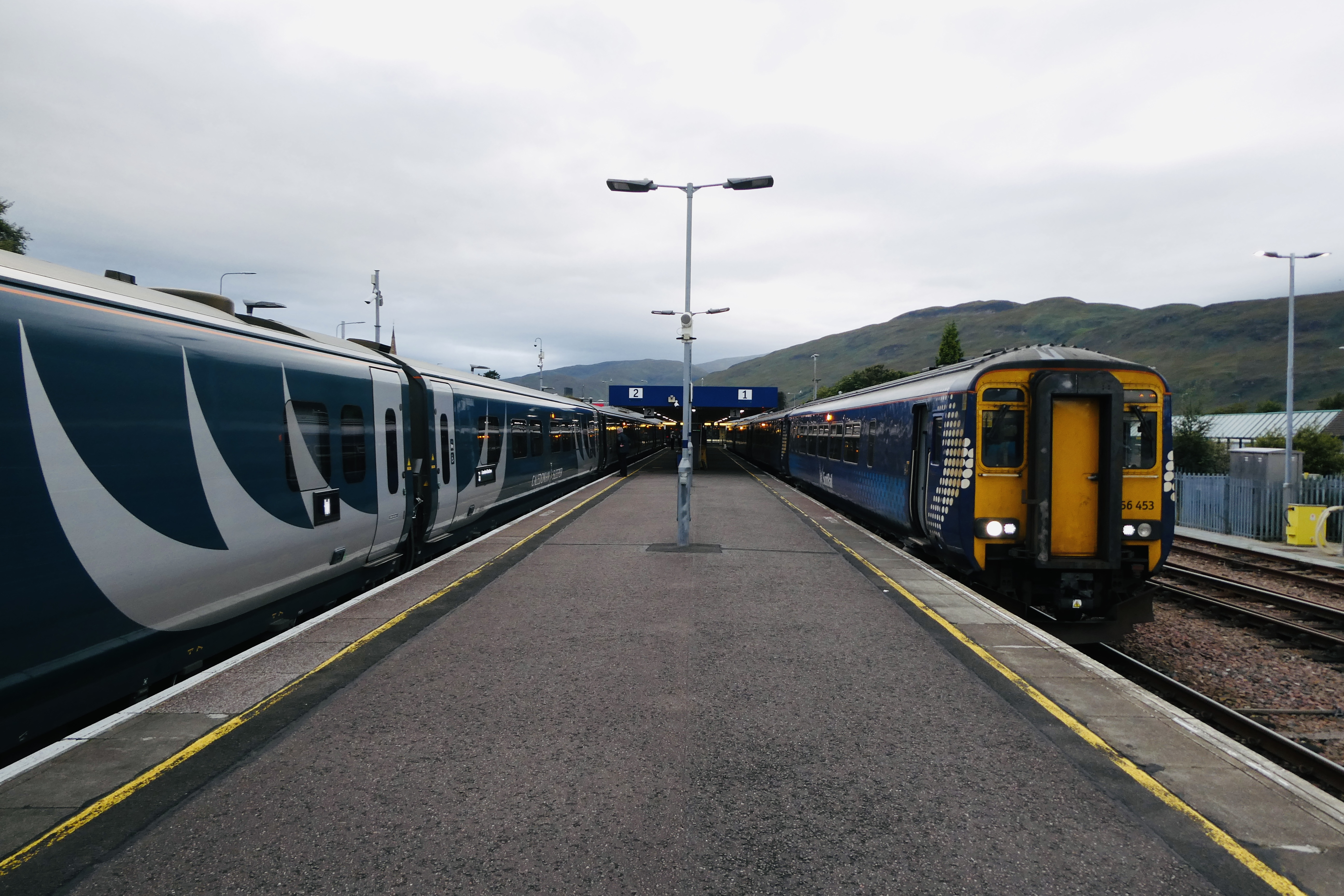
Caledonian Sleeper and ScotRail services standing at Fort William station

Fort William has three daytime trains per day in each direction on Mondays to Saturdays, running between Glasgow Queen Street and Mallaig. There is also a daily early morning service to Mallaig that starts at Fort William, with a similar return service in the evening, which connects with the Caledonian Sleeper. The regular Sunday service consists of two trains per day each way between Glasgow and Mallaig, with the schedule in the peak season supplemented by one service between Fort William and Mallaig.

The Caledonian Sleeper operates six nights per week (not Saturday nights) to and from London Euston, starting and terminating at Fort William. The sleeper also carries seated coaches and can thus be used as a regular service train to/from Glasgow Queen Street and Edinburgh Waverley.

The Jacobite operates non-stop between Fort William and Mallaig. This runs all year round, with a maximum of two trains per day Monday to Saturday and one on Sunday. A reduced Jacobite timetable is operated later in the summer.

Preceding station	National Rail	Following station
Spean Bridge	ScotRail; West Highland Line	Banavie
Terminus	ScotRail; West Highland Line	Terminus
Spean Bridge	Caledonian Sleeper; Highland Caledonian Sleeper	Terminus
	Heritage railways	
Mallaig	West Coast Railways; The Jacobite	Terminus
	Historical railways	
Spean Bridge; Line and station open	North British Railway; West Highland Railway	Banavie Pier; Line mostly open; station closed
Terminus	North British Railway; West Highland Railway	Banavie Pier; Line mostly open; station closed
Banavie; Line and station open	North British Railway; Mallaig Extension Railway of West Highland Railway	Terminus

== See also ==
- West Highland Railway

== Bibliography ==
- Brailsford, Martyn, ed. (December 2017) [1987]. Railway Track Diagrams 1: Scotland & Isle of Man (6th ed.). Frome: Trackmaps. ISBN 978-0-9549866-9-8.
- Butt, R. V. J. (October 1995). The Directory of Railway Stations: details every public and private passenger station, halt, platform and stopping place, past and present (1st ed.). Sparkford: Patrick Stephens Ltd. ISBN 978-1-85260-508-7. OCLC 60251199. OL 11956311M.
- Jowett, Alan (March 1989). Jowett's Railway Atlas of Great Britain and Ireland: From Pre-Grouping to the Present Day (1st ed.). Sparkford: Patrick Stephens Ltd. ISBN 978-1-85260-086-0. OCLC 22311137.
- Jowett, Alan (2000). Jowett's Nationalised Railway Atlas (1st ed.). Penryn, Cornwall: Atlantic Transport Publishers. ISBN 978-0-906899-99-1. OCLC 228266687.
- Quick, Michael (2023) [2001]. Railway passenger stations in Great Britain: a chronology (PDF). version 5.05. Railway & Canal Historical Society.
