= Mallaig Extension Railway =

UK railway company

Overview
- Dates of operation: 1 April 1901–21 December 1908
- Successor: North British Railway

Technical
- Track gauge: 4 ft 8 1/2 in (1,435 mm)

The Mallaig Extension Railway is a railway line in Highland, Scotland. It runs from Banavie Junction (New) on the Banavie Pier branch of the West Highland Railway to Mallaig. The previous "Banavie Junction" closer to Fort William was renamed "Mallaig Junction" upon opening of the Mallaig Extension Railway. The line is still open as part of the West Highland Line.

== Proposal ==
The railway was envisaged as extension of the railway from Glasgow to Fort William, which opened in 1894. Fort William was not a suitable location for a deep water fishing port, hence the need to extend the line north west to allow transport of fish to major markets and to improve the economy of an impoverished and underdeveloped part of Scotland. Accordingly, the Mallaig Extension Railway was the last major railway line to be constructed during the first phase of the development of Britain's rail network 1825-1901 and the first major line to be built with a subsidy from the UK Government. Initially, the line was intended to terminate at Roshven, where a deep water port would have been constructed. Opposition from landowners led to the line being constructed to Mallaig instead and a fishing port was duly developed there. Roshven was never served by rail and the proposed port at Roshven went unbuilt.

== Opening ==
The railway received Royal Assent on 31 July 1894. The line opened on 1 April 1901. It is famous for the concrete structures built along the line by Sir Robert McAlpine, the most notable of which is Glenfinnan Viaduct.

== Operations ==
The line was operated from the start by the North British Railway, which became part of the London and North Eastern Railway in 1923 and then the Scottish Region of British Railways in 1948. As of 2025, the line is operated by ScotRail and the infrastructure is maintained by Network Rail.

== Unsuccessful closure proposals ==
There have been several proposals to close the line, notably in the Beeching cuts of the 1960s and the Serpell report of 1982. None have been implemented, in large part due to the condition of the parallel A830 road, which was in part single track with passing places until 2009.

As of 2025, the line has become an important part of Scotland's tourism infrastructure (including The Jacobite (steam train) in summer months and consequently there are no longer any proposals to close the line.

== Connections to other lines ==
- West Highland Railway at Banavie Junction (new)

== Sources ==
- Awdry, Christopher (1990). Encyclopaedia of British Railway Companies. Sparkford: Patrick Stephens Ltd. ISBN 1-8526-0049-7. OCLC 19514063. CN 8983.
- Butt, R. V. J. (October 1995). The Directory of Railway Stations: details every public and private passenger station, halt, platform and stopping place, past and present (1st ed.). Sparkford: Patrick Stephens Ltd. ISBN 978-1-85260-508-7. OCLC 60251199. OL 11956311M.
- Jowett, Alan (March 1989). Jowett's Railway Atlas of Great Britain and Ireland: From Pre-Grouping to the Present Day (1st ed.). Sparkford: Patrick Stephens Ltd. ISBN 978-1-85260-086-0. OCLC 22311137.
- Thomas, John (1965). The West Highland Railway. Newton Abbot: David and Charles (Publishers) Ltd. ISBN 0-7153-7281-5.
- RAILSCOT on Mallaig Extension Railway
