= Faslane Platform railway station =

Closed railway station in Argyll and Bute, Scotland

Faslane Platform Faslane Junction Platform

General information
- Location: Between Shandon and Rhu, Argyll and Bute; Scotland
- Coordinates: 56.0399°N 4.7981°W
- Grid reference: NS257865
- Platforms: 1

Other information
- Status: Disused

History
- Original company: London and North Eastern Railway

Key dates
- 26 August 1945: Opened
- Circa 1949: Closed
Location

Faslane Platform railway station or Faslane Junction Platform railway station was a temporary private railway station located near the Stuckendoff PoW camp, Shandon, Dunbartonshire, Scotland. Opened in 1945 by the LNER in connection with the construction of the Loch Sloy Hydro-Electric facility and was located on the Shandon side of the Chapel Burn and recorded to be out of use by around 1949 in the British Railways era.

== History ==
The station lay on the West Highland Railway that opened the line to passengers on 7 August 1894; later operated by the North British Railway, until in 1923 it became part of the London and North Eastern Railway. In 1948 the line became part of the Scottish Region of British Railways following nationalisation and remains open as a route to Fort William, Mallaig and Oban.

Faslane was a halt that had a single platform and was opened by the LNER in 1945, but it closed around 1949 when construction work had been completed. Records show that it was not opened as a standard railway station for the general public and it was not listed in the 1948 British Railways (Scottish Region) timetable. The RCAHMS does not have a record of the station. The station served the Stuckendoff Camp and possibly the Blairvadach Camp that lay relatively near by.

== Infrastructure ==
Faslane, 5.2 miles (5.2 km) from Craigendoran Junction, had a single long straight platform and may have had a sectional 'slab' concrete frontage, as with Glen Falloch Halt and Inveruglas that were also built as part of the hydroelectric scheme. It was located on the northern side of the line approached by a lane running from Stuckendoff Farm near which a PoW camp was located. A signal box was located nearby with the junction to the Faslane military railway built during World War II to serve "Military Port No.1" at Faslane. The platform is recorded to have been 'served' by a single siding.

== The Garelochhead PoW Camps ==
Several PoW Camps were located in the area, such as Stuckendoff that stood near the farm of that name, no.582 at Blairvadach with its 40 Nissen huts, now the site of the Blairvadach Outdoor Centre and there was a third camp near Whistlefield above the hamlet of Portincaple. The German POWs at these camps were all dressed in brown trousers and tunics with the letters POW on the back.

== Loch Sloy scheme ==
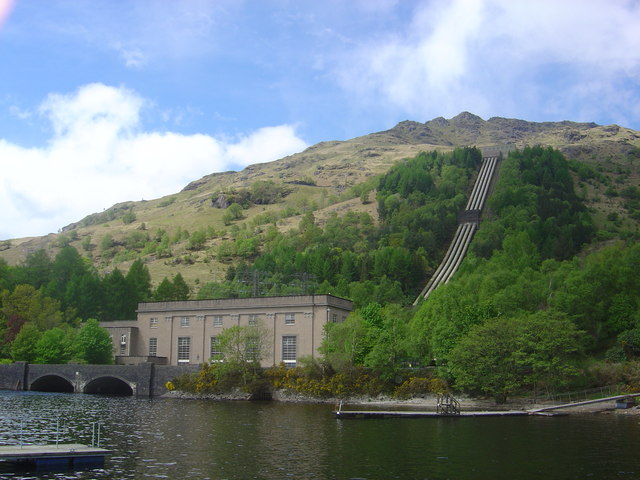
Loch Sloy hydro-electric power station with the penstocks behind.

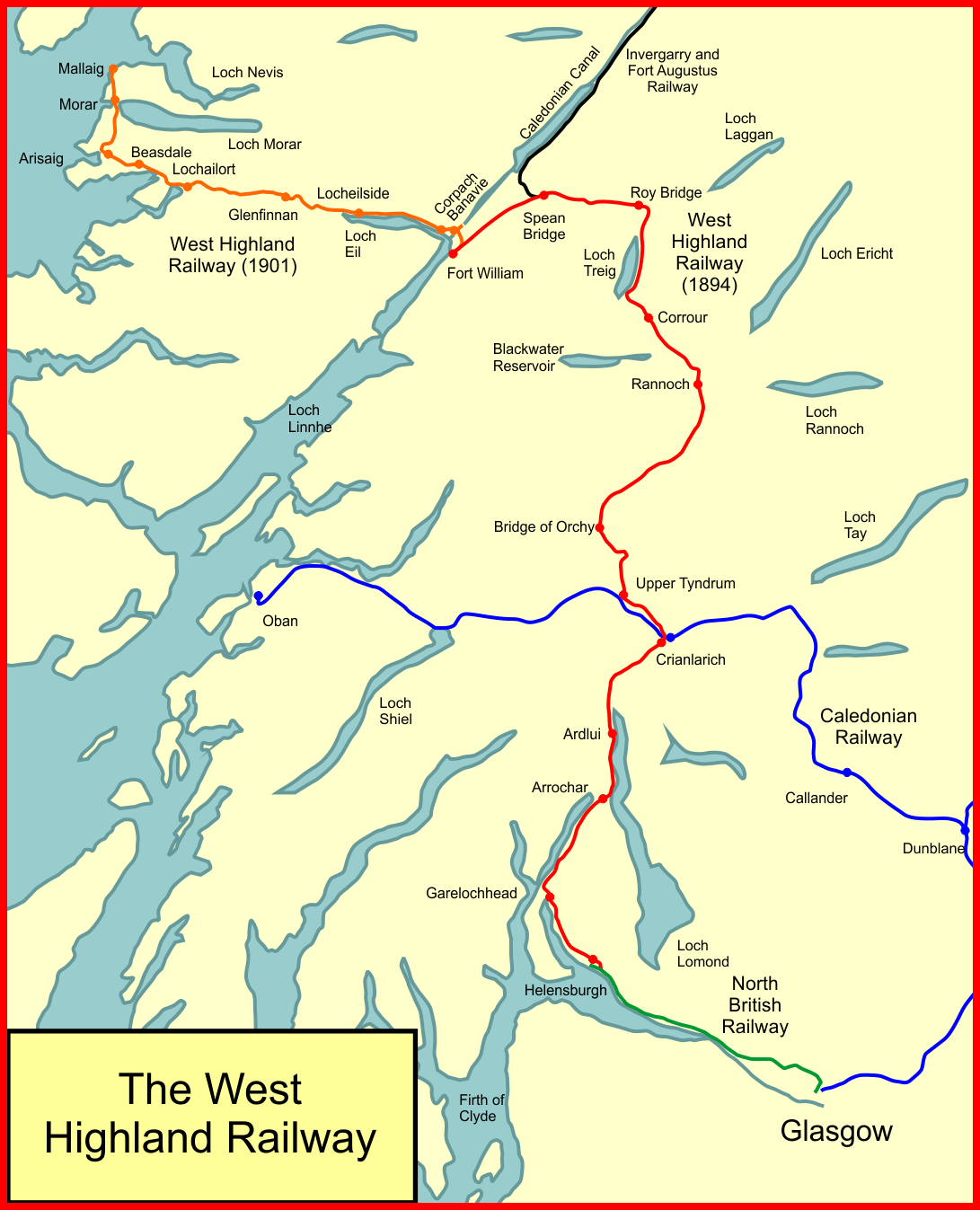
System map of the West Highland Railway

After World War II many German, especially East German, as well as Italian ex-prisoners stayed in Scotland for some time before being repatriated and it is recorded that a number of German and Italian POWs were involved in the early stages of the construction of the Sloy/Awe Hydro-Electric facility between Loch Sloy and Inveruglas, on the west bank of Loch Lomond. The POWs and guards travelled by train from Faslane Platform, Whistlefield and Garelochhead stations, transported in two carriages to the new railway station at Inveruglas. The POWs were being encouraged to learn a trade before returning to their homelands as many were no longer technically PoWs. Glen Falloch Halt may have been used by men building the aqueducts and tunnels that collected water from the Glen Falloch burns and carried it to Loch Sloy.

Construction at the Loch Sloy project began in May 1945, under the auspices of the North of Scotland Hydro-Electric Board, and it was completed in 1949 prior to the formal opening in 1950, dates that coincide with the known use of Faslane Platform.

As stated the prisoners-of-war were carried from the platform that stood near Faslane Junction to Inveruglas or the nearby Glen Falloch Halt.

== The West Highland Line ==
Preceding station	National Rail	Following station
Rhu; Line and Station closed	LNER	Shandon; Line open; Station closed

== See also ==
- Fersit Halt
- Glen Douglas Siding
- Glen Falloch Halt
- Gorton Station
- Lech-a-Vuie Platform
