= Inveruglas railway station =

Closed railway station in Argyll and Bute, Scotland

Inveruglas

General information
- Location: Between Arrochar and Tarbet and Ardlui, Argyll and Bute; Scotland
- Coordinates: 56.24847°N 4.716163°W
- Grid reference: NN31800953
- Platforms: 1

History
- Original company: London and North Eastern Railway

Key dates
- 29 October 1945: Opened
- Circa 1948: Closed
Location

Inveruglas was a remote temporary private railway station near the hamlet of Inveruglas, Argyll and Bute, Scotland. Opened in 1945 by the LNER, it was built in connection with the construction of the Sloy Hydro-Electric facility and was located on the Ardlui side of the Inveruglas Viaduct and recorded to be out of use by around 1948.

== History ==
The station lay on the West Highland Railway that opened the line to passengers on 7 August 1894; later operated by the North British Railway, until in 1923 it became part of the London and North Eastern Railway. In 1948 the line became part of the Scottish Region of British Railways following nationalisation and remains open as a route to Fort William, Mallaig and Oban.

Inveruglas had a single platform and was opened by the LNER in 1945, but it closed around 1948 when construction work had been completed. Records show that it was not opened as a standard railway station for the general public and it was not listed in the 1948 British Railways (Scottish Region) timetable. The RCAHMS refer to the station as being temporary.

On 18 October 1950 the scheme was formally opened by Queen Elizabeth as Queen Consort and although she travelled by car the guests arrived by train to Inveruglas station, leaving Edinburgh Waverley at 10.50 with a dining car, calling at Dumbarton and Helensburgh Upper and returning at 17.22.

== Infrastructure ==
Inveruglas, 23 miles (37 km) from Craigendoran Junction, had a single long straight platform with a sectional 'slab' concrete frontage, as with Glen Falloch Halt. It was located on the southern or 'loch' side of the line with a signal box located on it, a gravel surface, a passing loop, several sidings and a loading ramp. The station had a typical name board that was later located on the walls of a nearby farm house. A crane stood near the loading dock and a small corrugated iron shelter was provided together with the station name board. A PoW construction camp with several Nissen huts was located immediately behind the platform. The track at Inveruglas was slightly realigned to accommodate the penstocks carrying the water from Loch Sloy that down the hill and enter the power station.

== Loch Sloy scheme ==
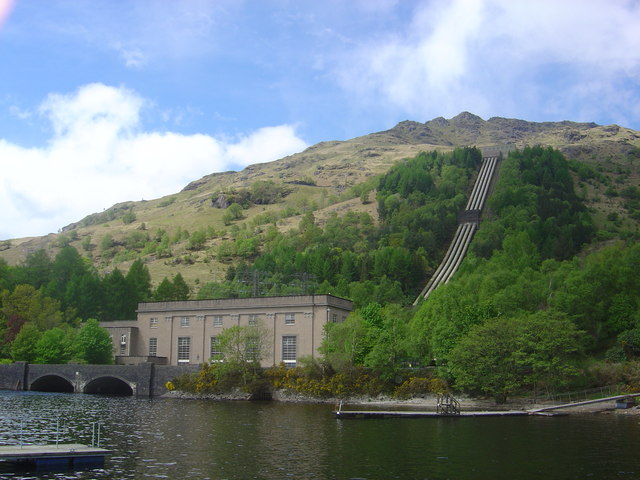
Loch Sloy hydro-electric power station with the penstocks behind.

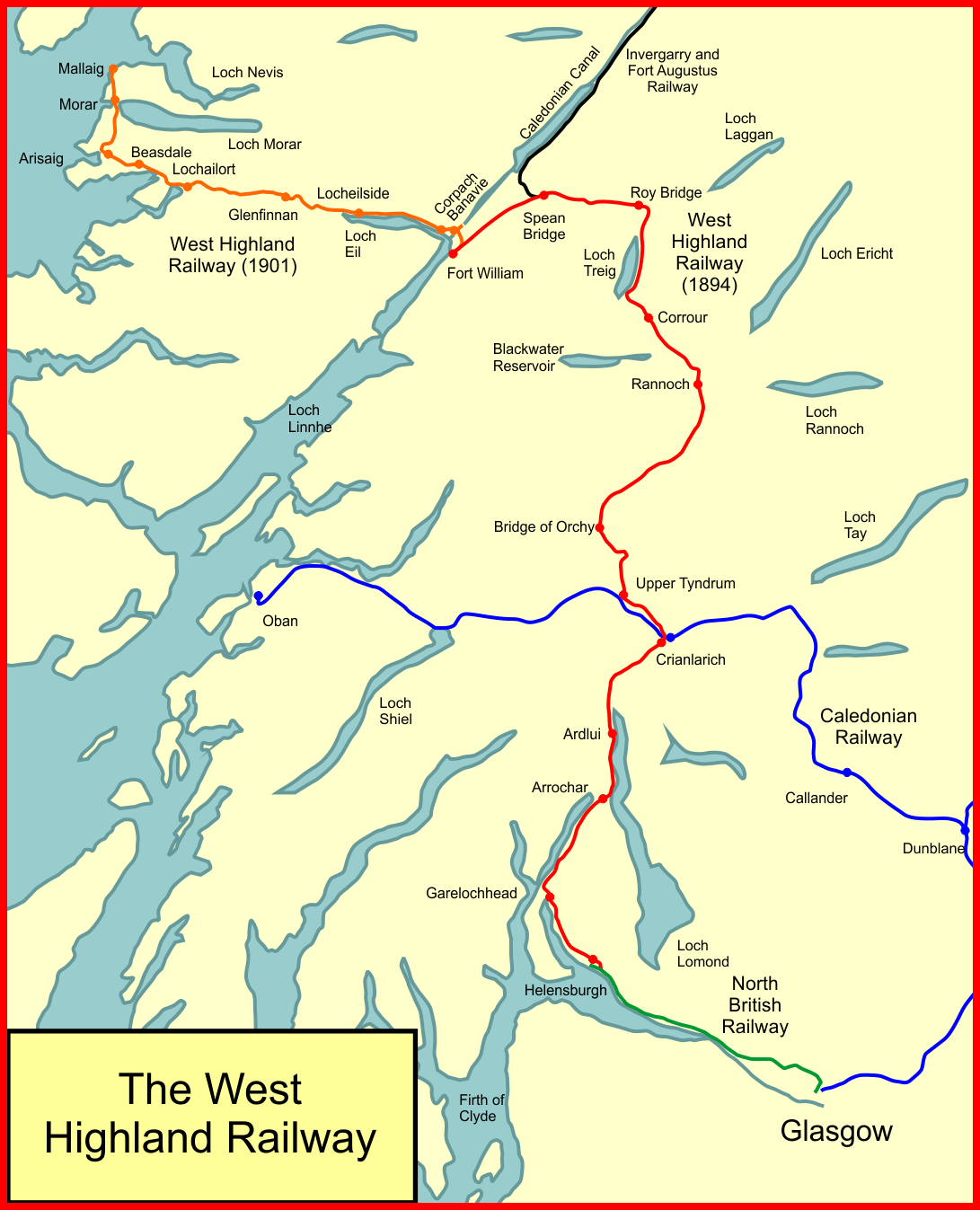
System map of the West Highland Railway

After World War II many German and Italian ex-prisoners stayed in Scotland, and it is recorded that a number of German and Italian POWs had been involved in the early stages of the construction of the Sloy/Awe Hydro-Electric facility between Loch Sloy and Inveruglas, on the west bank of Loch Lomond. The POWs and guards arrived by train from Whistlefield and Garelochhead stations, transported in two carriages to the new railway siding at Inveruglas. The POWS were to learn a trade before returning to their homelands. Glen Falloch Halt may have been used by men building the aqueducts and tunnels that collected water from the Glen Falloch burns and carried it to Loch Sloy.

Construction at the Loch Sloy project began in May 1945, under the auspices of the North of Scotland Hydro-Electric Board, and it was completed in 1949, dates that coincide with the known use of Inveruglas station and its passing loop.

The prisoners-of-war were carried from Faslane Platform near Faslane Junction to Inveruglas or the nearby Glen Falloch Halt.

== The West Highland Line ==
Preceding station	National Rail	Following station
Arrochar and Tarbet; Line and Station open	LNER	Ardlui; Line open; Station open

== See also ==
- Fersit Halt
- Glen Douglas Siding
- Glen Falloch Halt
- Gorton Station
- Lech-a-Vuie Platform
