= Glen Douglas Halt railway station =

Disused railway station in Argyll and Bute, Scotland

Glen Douglas Halt Glen Douglas Platform
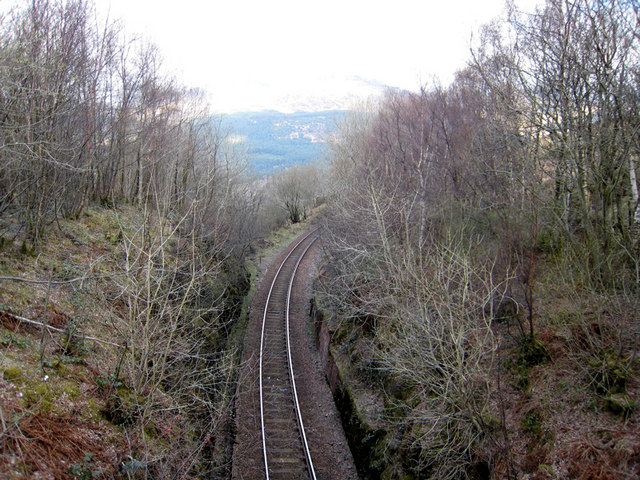
- The West Highland Line in Glen Douglas

General information
- Location: Glen Douglas between Garelochhead station and Arrochar and Tarbert station, Argyll and Bute; Scotland
- Coordinates: 56.156589°N 4.7798114°W
- Grid reference: NS 2745 9947
- Platforms: 2

Other information
- Status: Disused

History
- Original company: West Highland Railway
- Pre-grouping: North British Railway
- Post-grouping: London and North Eastern Railway

Key dates
- 7 August 1894: Opened
- By September 1926: Re-named Glen Douglas Platform (Private)
- By May 1942: Re-named Glen Douglas (Private)
- 12 June 1961: Re-named Glen Douglas Halt
- 15 June 1964: Closed for passengers
- 1973: closed completely
Location

Glen Douglas Halt railway station was known as Craggan in the line's construction reports, also Glen Douglas Siding, Glen Douglas Platform (Private), Glen Douglas (Private) and finally Glen Douglas Halt. Opened by the North British Railway in 1894 its status has changed several times along with its official name. The form Glendouglas was also sometimes used, such as on the platform name board.

== Location ==
This old station on the Glasgow-Crianlarich trunk section of the West Highland Line was situated in a remote spot above Craggan, Loch Long, at the head of Glen Douglas, which drops away east to Inverbeg on Loch Lomond. It is in the parish of Luss, historically in Dunbartonshire, now in the Argyll and Bute Council area. It is at a local summit (560 feet, 171 m) between the stations of Garelochhead and Arrochar and Tarbet. The site is accessible by a short track from the public road between Craggan and Inverbeg via Glen Douglas. The Three Lochs Way, a 34-mile (55 km) off-road walking and cycle route between Balloch and Inveruglas, passes by the station.

== History ==
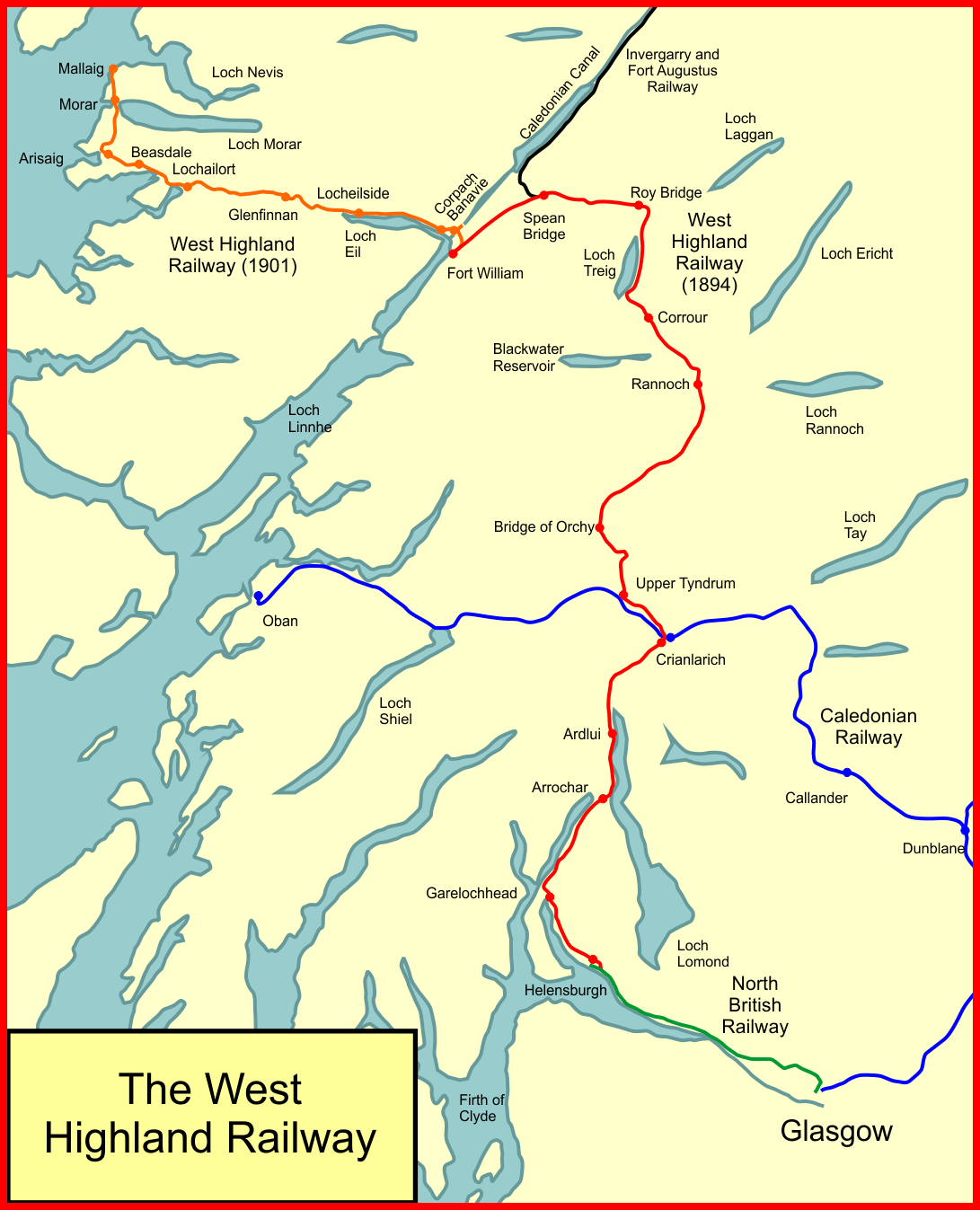
System map of the West Highland Railway

The West Highland Railway opened the line to passengers on 7 August 1894; later it was operated by the North British Railway, until in 1923 it became part of the London and North Eastern Railway. In 1948 the line became part of the Scottish Region of British Railways following nationalisation.

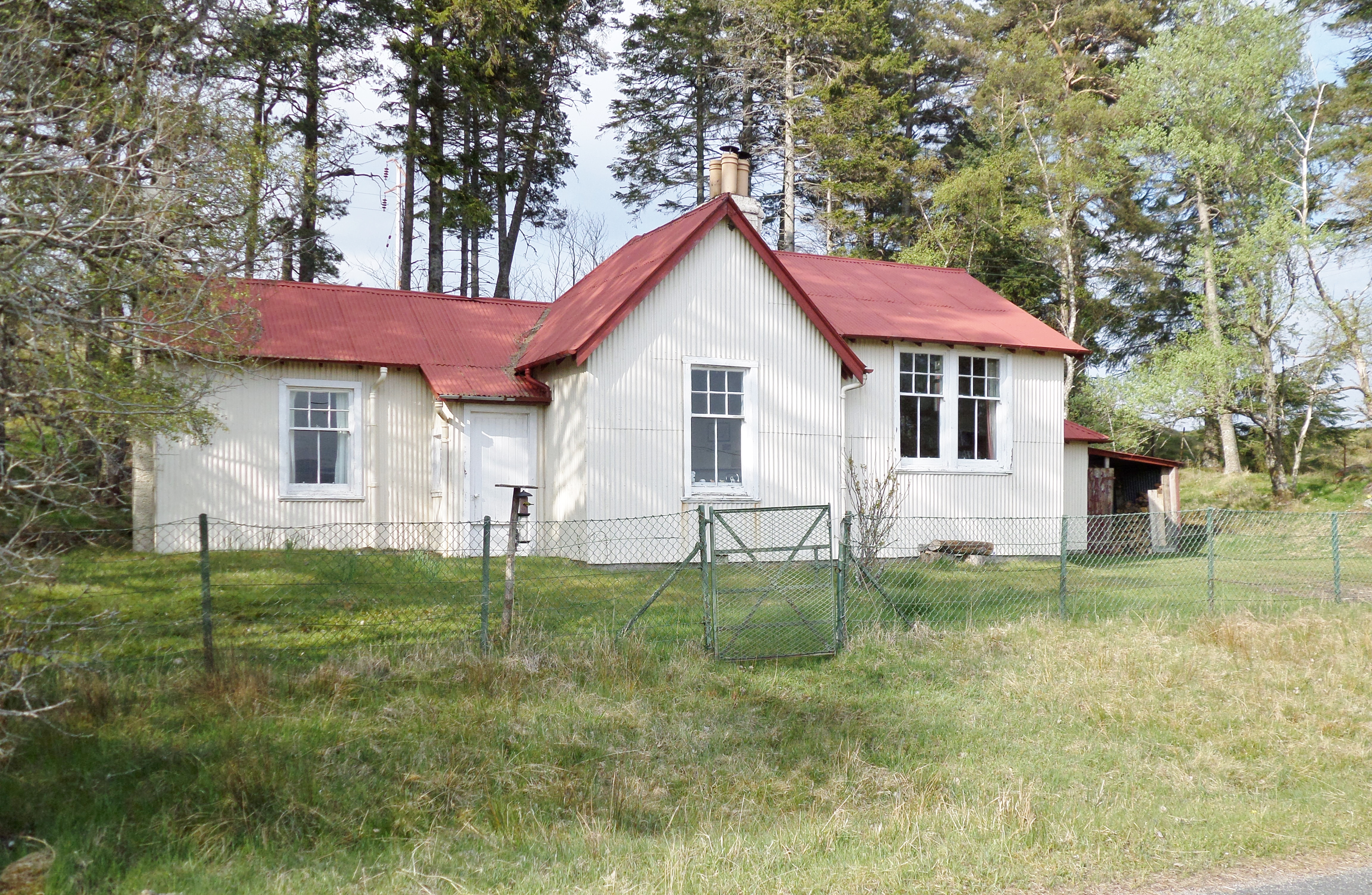
Rannoch Railway station School

When the line was being built, the West Highland Railway was concerned about possible damage to the line caused by earth tremors emanating from the Highland Boundary Fault, an ancient geological fracture zone, branches of which run in the area. A warning bell was therefore fitted in the signalbox (and also in Arrochar and Tarbet signalbox). There is no record of its ever being activated.

The status of the station was somewhat open to question from the start and the precise details of naming and use are debated. One source gives the designation from 1895 to 1926 as Glen Douglas Siding, supported by OS map place names; Glen Douglas Platform (Private) from 1926 to 1942; Glen Douglas (Private) from 1942 to 1961 and finally Glen Douglas Halt as a stop for the general public from 1961 to its final closure in 1964. The Summer 1962 timetable shows 4 trains each way (6 on a Sunday). The NBR Study Group record that Glen Douglas ceased to see regular passenger use after 1926 when it is recorded that the station was mainly used by school pupils. The halt was used by railway staff until about 1973

In 1896 the all station service from Craigendoran to Arrochar gave Glen Douglas passing place a regular service.

In the 1897 regulations for the exchange of goods between the North British Railway and the Caledonian Railway Glen Douglas is not recorded as a fully fledged station.

The station was used from September 1926 by the children of railway personnel who attended the LNER school there, other schools being at Gorton in an old carriage on the platform and at Rannoch in a purpose built corrugated iron building.

A small school is shown on OS maps located near Tullich and a hamlet of Craggan is shown on the shores of Loch Long with a Creagan Sithe place name near by.

An official British Railways photograph of 1959 shows a one coach Wickham railbus taken at a neat and tidy Glen Douglas Station with a northbound train from Craigendoran. This was the 'Wee Arrochar' service from Craigendoran Upper station that ceased in 1964 after which Glen Douglas Halt closed. Seating and lighting was provided.

== Infrastructure ==
Standing close to the Glen Douglas Summit at 564 feet (172 metres) and 15 miles (24 km) from Craigendoran Junction the station had an island platform within a passing loop. In common with the line's other remote passing places, Corrour and Gorton, on the platform it had a tall conventional signal box and adjacent low buildings in which the staff lived which have now been demolished.

A pair of semi-detached small railway cottages were located at Glen Douglas, similar in appearance to the one at Whistlefield railway station.

The 1914 OS map records the name 'Glen Douglas Siding' and shows a signal box, an island platform with buildings, a short loading dock and a single siding to the south on the western side with associated structures and a building all linked to the rough access track. The Colquhoun's Estate tenants had successfully petitioned the North British Railway for this freight facility that served both Lochlongside and Lochlomondside. The siding was opened on 27 May 1895.

DM Glen Douglas is connected on the east side of the line to the rail network via a short branch from the West Highland Line, served from the south and running into the depot at the site of the old station which at one time mainly served the base. A ground frame is present and the site is a radio electronic token block exchange point. The track runs as if an island platform were still present.

== The West Highland Line ==
Preceding station	National Rail	Following station
Garelochhead	ScotRail; West Highland Line	Arrochar and Tarbet
Garelochhead	Caledonian Sleeper; Highland Caledonian Sleeper	Arrochar and Tarbet
	Historical railways	
Whistlefield	North British Railway; West Highland Railway	Arrochar and Tarbet

== See also ==
- Fersit Halt railway station
- Glen Falloch Halt railway station
- Gorton railway station (West Highland Line)
- Inveruglas railway station
- Lech-a-Vuie Platform railway station
