= Whistlefield railway station =

Disused railway station in Argyll and Bute, Scotland

Whistlefield Whistlefield Halt
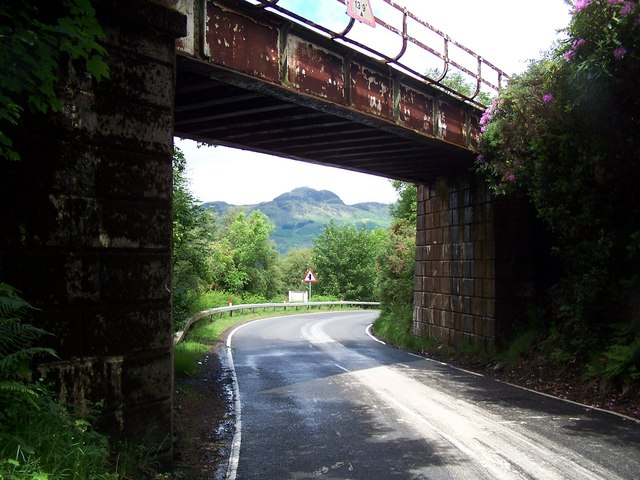
- The railway bridge near the old Whistlefield Station site

General information
- Location: Between Garelochhead and Glen Douglas, Argyll and Bute; Scotland
- Coordinates: 56.097134°N 4.838802°W
- Grid reference: NS23519300
- Platforms: 1

History
- Original company: West Highland Railway

Key dates
- 1 May 1896: Opened
- 13 June 1960: Renamed Whilstlefield Halt
- 15 June 1964: Closed
Location

Whistlefield, later Whistlefield Halt, was a minor station on the West Highland Line 10.30 miles (15.76 Kilometres) from Craigendoran Junction railway station near the hamlet of Portincaple on Loch Long, Argyll and Bute, Scotland. Opened in 1896 by the West Highland Railway, it was built on a single track section without a passing loop in between Garelochhead and Glen Douglas and closed by the British Railways Board in 1964.

== History ==
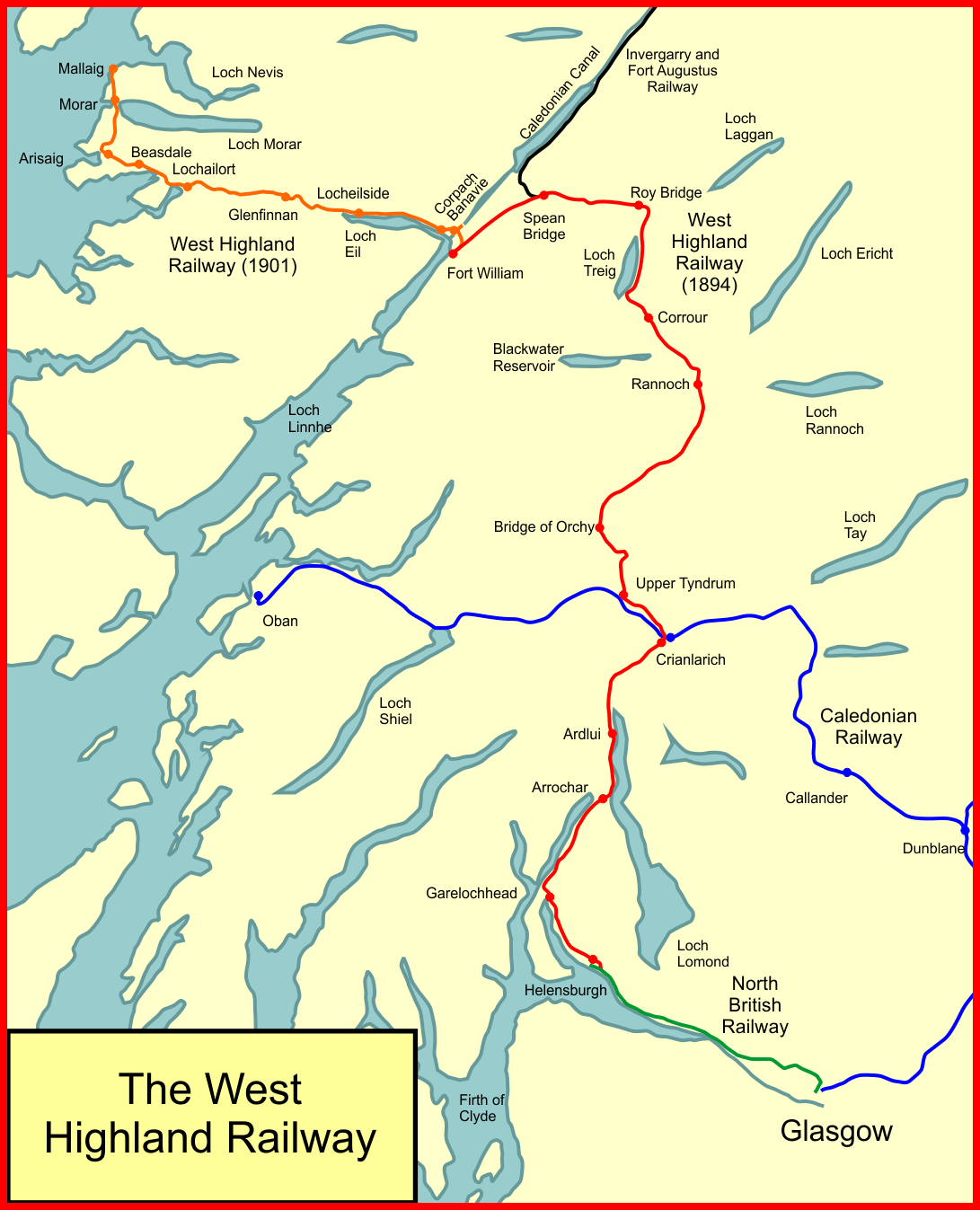
System map of the West Highland Railway

The station was officially opened at 12 noon on Tuesday 20 October 1896, designed by the architect James Miller, and it was of a different design to the other stations on the West Highland Railway that had opened the line to passengers on 7 August 1894; later operated by the North British Railway, until in 1923 it became part of the London and North Eastern Railway. In 1948 the line became part of the Scottish Region of British Railways following nationalisation and remains open as a route to Fort William, Mallaig and Oban. The trustees of the Luss Estates (Colquhoun) had been promised a station and the North British Railway finally conceded. The 'chalet-like' and non-standard appearance as well as the later opening date are explained by the reluctance of the company to invest in a station in this remote spot.

Built to serve the Whistlefield hamlet, Portincaple with its fishing fleet and the surrounding area, the first station master was George Gall who was in post until his retirement in 1929 after which date both Shandon and Whistlefield came under the control of Garelochhead until closure and demolition in 1964. At one time it was in regular use for Sunday church services.

In 1906, when King Edward VII came by train to the area before continuing to Fort William and he was welcomed at Whistlefield by the stationmaster George Gall, with flags and other decorations adorning the whole station.

Whistlefield and near by Shandon were the locations of a German PoW camps and prisoners were regularly taken by train from the Faslane Platform and Whistlefield to work on the Loch Sloy hydroelectric scheme, disembarking at Inveruglas or possibly Glen Falloch Halt.

The station and inn were frequented by the many drovers using the drove roads that once ran through this area to Portincaple and other destinations.

The original 1896 service, affectionately known as the Wee Arrochar, was a Craigendoran (Upper) to Arrochar and Tarbet via Whistlefield and the other local stations and halts that was continued by British Rail until June 1964, when it fell victim to the Beeching Axe.

== Infrastructure ==
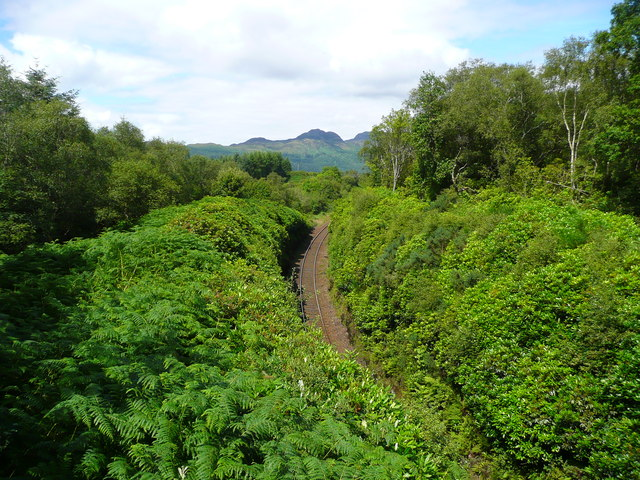
The West Highland Line near the Whistlefield Station site.

The single platformed station, without a passing loop, was located on a steep section of the line between the Garelochhead and Finnart Viaducts. A new platform was built in 1925. Steps ran up from the road to the station and remnants of these can still be seen. Railway cottages were built slightly to the north and these survive as private dwellings. The Whistlefield Store and tea room, later the 'Green Kettle Inn' was built close by to capture the trade created by the railway with steamer excursions on the loch, picnickers, etc. A house for the innkeeper was also constructed.

A siding was recorded as present in 1896 and a photograph of the 1920 or 1930s also shows a loading dock of some kind built from railway sleepers with a shed which may help explain the detailed instructions on the railway sign regarding shunting on the line with its significantly steep gradient. Boxes of fish from the Portincaple fishing fleet were loaded on to passenger trains. The station was host to a LNER camping coach from 1936 to 1939.

When first opened no signalling was present and the point for the siding was worked under the control of a tablet. Bruce Henderson was the signalman at a later date, living in the railway cottage until moving to Garelochhead. A pair of semi-detached small railway cottages were also located at Glen Douglas, similar in appearance to the one at Whistlefield railway station.

A water balance funicular railway had been proposed from Whistlefield down to Portincaple to carry passengers using a steamer service at a new pier.

== The West Highland Line ==
| Preceding station | National Rail | Following station |
|---|---|---|
| Garelochhead | ScotRail; West Highland Line | Arrochar and Tarbet |
| | Historical railways | |
| Garelochhead; Line open; Station open | North British Railway; West Highland Railway | Glen Douglas Halt; Line open; Station closed |

== See also ==
- Fersit Halt
- Glen Douglas Halt
- Glen Falloch Halt
- Gorton Station
- Lech-a-Vuie Platform
