= Ardlui railway station =

Railway station in Argyll and Bute, Scotland

Ardlui Scottish Gaelic: Àird Laoigh
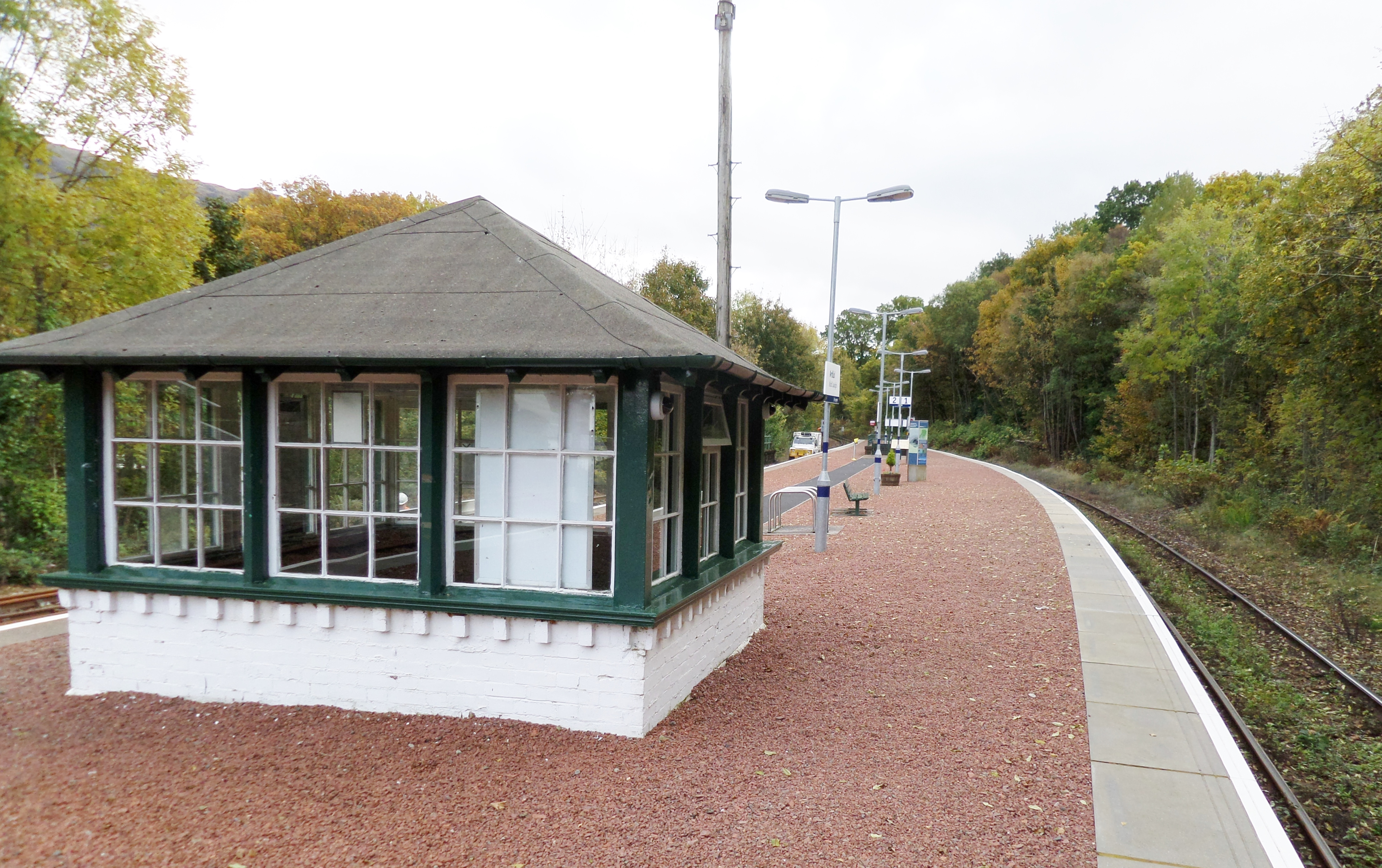
- Looking south towards Arrochar & Tarbet, with the old signal box in view

General information
- Location: Ardlui, Argyll and Bute; Scotland
- Coordinates: 56.3019°N 4.7217°W
- Grid reference: NN316155
- Manager: ScotRail
- Platforms: 2

Other information
- Station code: AUI

History
- Original company: West Highland Railway
- Pre-grouping: North British Railway
- Post-grouping: LNER

Key dates
- 7 August 1894: Opened

Passengers
- 2021/22: ▲3,054
- 2022/23: ▲3,282
- 2023/24: ▲4,118
- 2024/25: ▼4,050
- 2025/26: ▲4,752

Listed Building – Category C(S)
- Designated: 29 March 1996
- Reference no.: LB43177
Location
Notes
- Passenger statistics from the Office of Rail and Road

Ardlui railway station is a rural railway station, serving Ardlui at the north end of Loch Lomond, in Scotland. The station is located on the West Highland Line, sited 27 miles 43 chains (44.3 km) from Craigendoran Junction, near Helensburgh, between Crianlarich and Arrochar and Tarbet. ScotRail manage the station and operate most services, others provided by Caledonian Sleeper.

== History ==
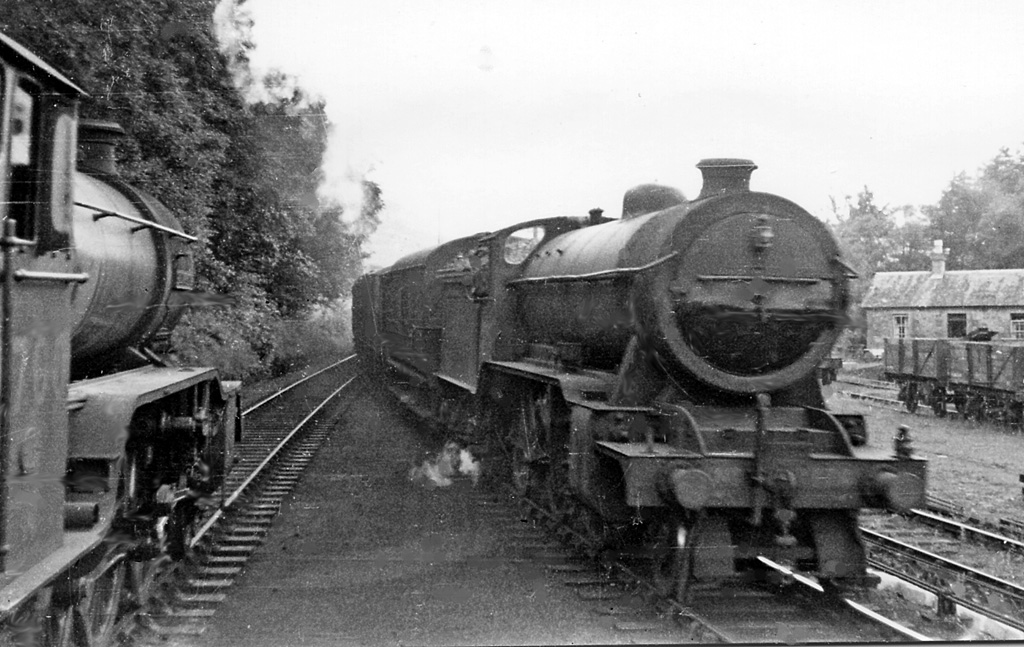
Trains crossing at Ardlui in 1948

Opened to passengers on 7 August 1894 by the West Highland Railway, then run by the North British Railway, it became part of the London and North Eastern Railway during the Grouping of 1923. The station was host to an LNER camping coach from 1935 to 1939 and possibly one for some of 1934. A camping coach was also positioned here from 1964 to 1966.

Between 1945 and 1948 a station and passing loop were located to the west of Ardlui at Inveruglas which served the passenger and freight requirements of the Sloy hydroelectric scheme.

Trains have used the procedure of right-hand running at the station since 1988, when RETB (Radio Electric Block Token) was introduced. This in turn makes the station sidings easier to access for engineering trains.

The former signal box, on the platform itself, now functions as a waiting room. The former waiting room was demolished in the 1970s.

== Facilities ==
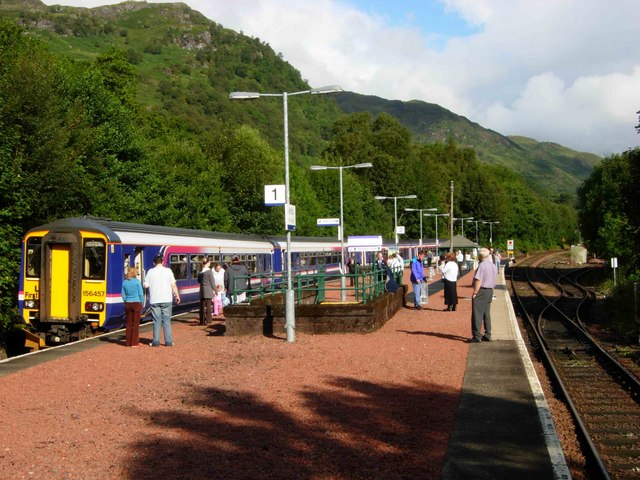
The station seen in 2006

The station has an island platform, equipped with a shelter and a waiting room, benches, bike racks and a help point. The only entrance to the station is directly off the A82, so there is no step free access. As there are no facilities to purchase tickets, passengers must buy one in advance, or from the guard on the train.

== Passenger volume ==
Passenger volume at Ardlui
	2004–05	2005–06	2006–07	2007–08	2008–09	2009–10	2010–11	2011–12	2012–13	2013–14	2014–15	2015–16	2016–17	2017–18	2018–19	2019–20	2020–21	2021–22	2022–23	2023–24	2024–25
Entries and exits	2,309	2,344	2,383	1,870	2,212	1,970	2,092	2,260	2,216	4,566	5,074	5,072	5,426	5,104	5,622	3,982	864	3,054	3,282	4,118	4,050

The statistics cover twelve month periods that start in April.

== Services ==
Monday to Saturday, there are six services to Oban and three to Mallaig (the latter combined with Oban portions, dividing at Crianlarich), and one service to Fort William (the Highland Caledonian Sleeper, weekday mornings only) northbound. Southbound, there are six services to Glasgow Queen Street High Level and one service to London Euston via Queen Street Low Level & Edinburgh Waverley (the Highland Caledonian Sleeper, which does not run on Saturday). On Sundays, there are two trains northbound to Mallaig, with one to Oban, along with the Caledonian Sleeper to Fort William. There is also an extra summer service to Oban. Southbound there are three trains southbound to Glasgow Queen Street.

Preceding station	National Rail	Following station
Arrochar and Tarbet	ScotRail; West Highland Line	Crianlarich
Arrochar and Tarbet	Caledonian Sleeper; Highland Caledonian Sleeper	Crianlarich
	Historical railways	
Arrochar and Tarbet; Line and Station open	West Highland Railway; North British Railway	Glen Falloch Halt; Line open; Station closed

== Bibliography ==
- Brailsford, Martyn, ed. (December 2017) [1987]. Railway Track Diagrams 1: Scotland & Isle of Man (6th ed.). Frome: Trackmaps. ISBN 978-0-9549866-9-8.
- Butt, R. V. J. (October 1995). The Directory of Railway Stations: details every public and private passenger station, halt, platform and stopping place, past and present (1st ed.). Sparkford: Patrick Stephens Ltd. ISBN 978-1-85260-508-7. OCLC 60251199. OL 11956311M.
- McRae, Andrew (1997). British Railway Camping Coach Holidays: The 1930s & British Railways (London Midland Region). Vol. Scenes from the Past: 30 (Part One). Foxline. ISBN 1-870119-48-7.
- McRae, Andrew (1998). British Railways Camping Coach Holidays: A Tour of Britain in the 1950s and 1960s. Vol. Scenes from the Past: 30 (Part Two). Foxline. ISBN 1-870119-53-3.
- Quick, Michael (2022). Railway Passenger Stations in Great Britain: A Chronology (PDF) (5th ed.). London: Railway and Canal Historical Society.
