= Rhu railway station =

Railway station in Argyll and Bute, Scotland

Rhu (Row)
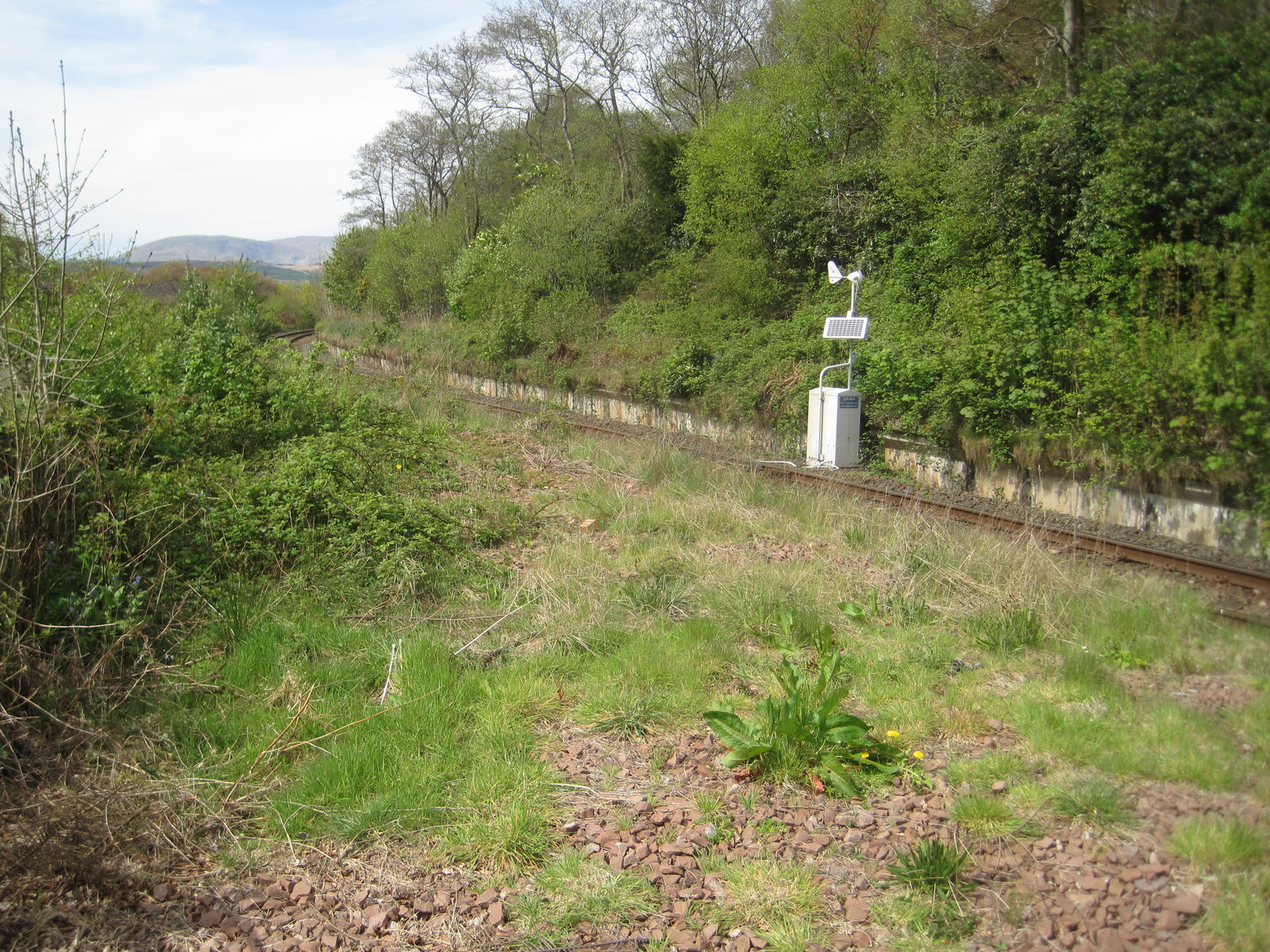

General information
- Location: Rhu, Argyll and Bute; Scotland
- Coordinates: 56.0218°N 4.7725°W
- Platforms: 1 (upon final closure)

Other information
- Status: Disused

History
- Original company: West Highland Railway
- Pre-grouping: North British Railway
- Post-grouping: LNER

Key dates
- 7 August 1894: Opened as Row
- 24 February 1927: Renamed as Rhu
- 6 July 1941: Loop and second platform reinstated
- 4 June 1950: Loop and second platform taken out of service
- 9 January 1956: Station closed
- 4 April 1960: Station re-opened
- 15 June 1964: Station closed
Location

Rhu is a closed railway station located in the village of Rhu, in Argyll and Bute, Scotland, on the east shore of Gare Loch. It is located towards the southern end of the West Highland Railway.

== History ==
This station opened as "Row" on 7 August 1894.

The station was laid out with two platforms linked by a footbridge, one on either side of a crossing loop. The use of side platforms here was slightly unusual, since the West Highland Railway was otherwise built with island platforms at stations, apart from at its northern end. There were sidings on the south side of the station.

On 24 February 1927, the spelling of the station's name was altered to "Rhu". The station was host to a LNER camping coach from 1935 to 1939. A camping coach was also positioned here by the Scottish Region from 1954 to 1956.

The station was initially closed to passengers in January 1956, but reopened in April 1960. A second (and final) closure came on 15 June 1964, when the Craigendoran (Upper) to Arrochar and Tarbet local service fell victim to the Beeching Axe.

Much of the structures have been demolished, but part of one platform is still visible.

There have been proposals to reopen the station as part of an experiment to open ‘pop-up’ stations in Scotland.

Preceding station	Historical railways	Following station
Helensburgh Upper; Line and Station open	West Highland Railway; North British Railway	Shandon; Line open; Station closed

== See also ==
- Faslane Platform railway station - A nearby temporary WWII station

== Sources ==
- Butt, R. V. J. (October 1995). The Directory of Railway Stations: details every public and private passenger station, halt, platform and stopping place, past and present (1st ed.). Sparkford: Patrick Stephens Ltd. ISBN 978-1-85260-508-7. OCLC 60251199. OL 11956311M.
- Hurst, Geoffrey (1992). Register of Closed Railways: 1948-1991. Worksop, Nottinghamshire: Milepost Publications. ISBN 0-9477-9618-5.
- McRae, Andrew (1997). British Railway Camping Coach Holidays: The 1930s & British Railways (London Midland Region). Vol. Scenes from the Past: 30 (Part One). Foxline. ISBN 1-870119-48-7.
- McRae, Andrew (1998). British Railways Camping Coach Holidays: A Tour of Britain in the 1950s and 1960s. Vol. Scenes from the Past: 30 (Part Two). Foxline. ISBN 1-870119-53-3.
