= Arrochar and Tarbet railway station =

Railway station in Argyll and Bute, Scotland

Arrochar & Tarbet Scottish Gaelic: An t-Arthar & An Tairbeart
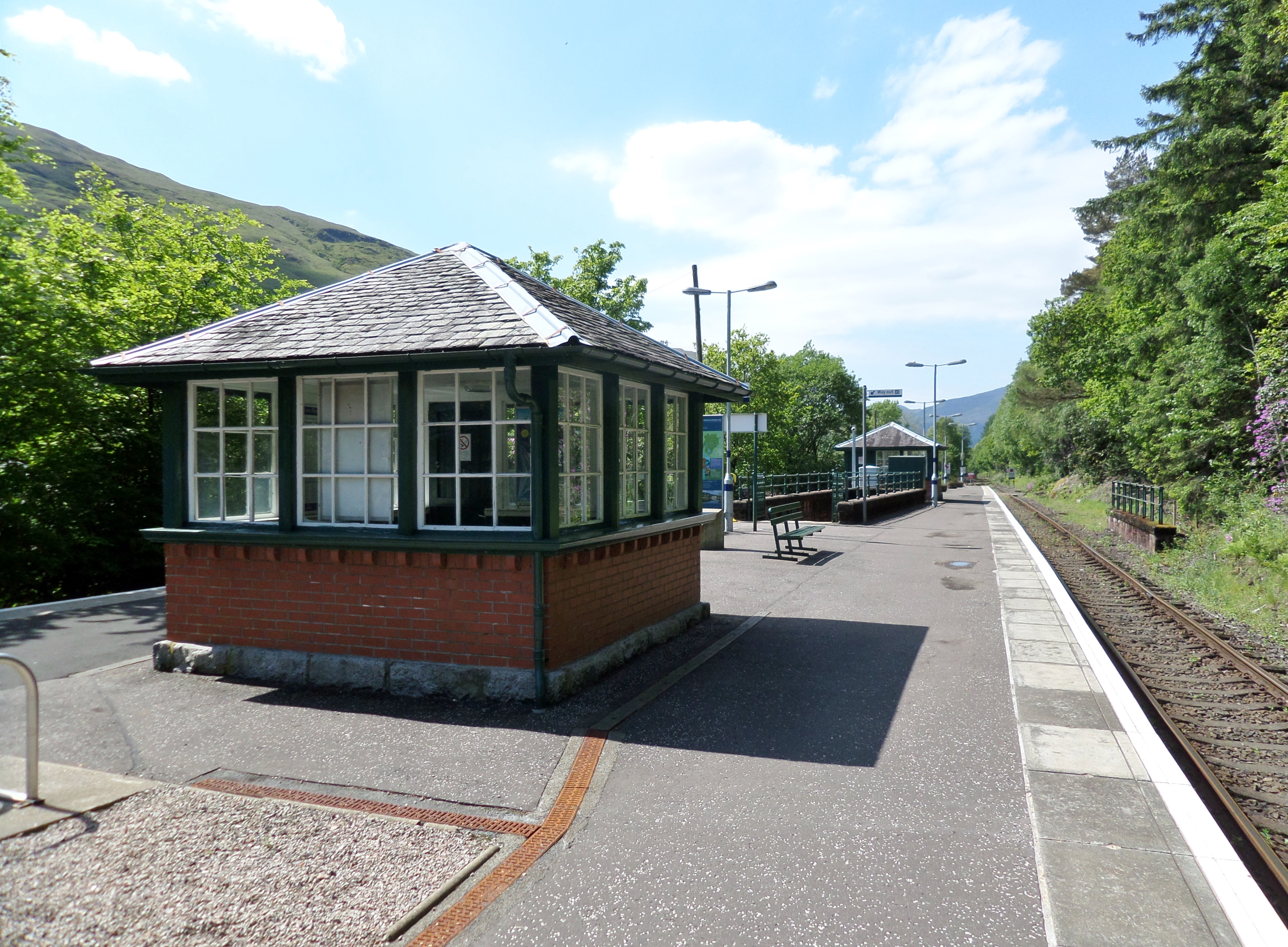
- View along platform towards Glen Douglas and Glasgow

General information
- Location: Tarbet, Argyll and Bute; Scotland
- Coordinates: 56.2033°N 4.7232°W
- Grid reference: NN311045
- Manager: ScotRail
- Platforms: 2

Other information
- Station code: ART

History
- Original company: West Highland Railway
- Pre-grouping: North British Railway
- Post-grouping: LNER

Key dates
- 7 August 1894: Opened

Passengers
- 2021/22: ▲15,400
- 2022/23: ▲16,958
- 2023/24: ▲21,686
- 2024/25: ▼20,438
- 2025/26: ▲23,860
Location
Notes
- Passenger statistics from the Office of Rail and Road

Arrochar and Tarbet railway station is a railway station on the West Highland Line in Scotland. It stands at the western (Arrochar) end of Tarbet. It is sited 19 miles 45 chains (31.5 km) from Craigendoran Junction, near Helensburgh, between Ardlui and Garelochhead. ScotRail manage the station and operate most services, with others provided by Caledonian Sleeper.

== History ==
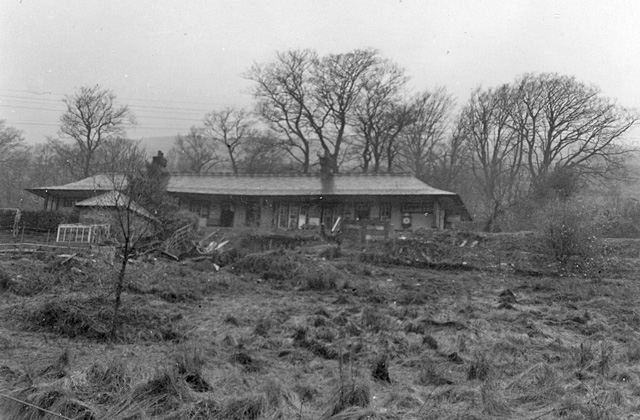
The station seen in April 1963

Opened to passengers on 7 August 1894 by the West Highland Railway, then run by the North British Railway, it became part of the London and North Eastern Railway during the Grouping of 1923. The station was host to a LNER camping coach from 1936 to 1939.

Under NBR and LNER auspices, the station was the terminus of a local service from Craigendoran (Upper) as well as being served by through trains to Fort William and Mallaig. Known as the Wee Arrochar, the Craigendoran service was continued by British Rail until June 1964, when it fell victim to the Beeching Axe.

Between 1945 and 1948 a station and passing loop were located north of Arrochar and Tarbet at Inveruglas which served the passenger and freight requirements of the Sloy hydroelectric scheme.

A camping coach was also positioned here by the Scottish Region from 1964 to 1969 after which all camping coaches in the region were withdrawn.

== Facilities ==
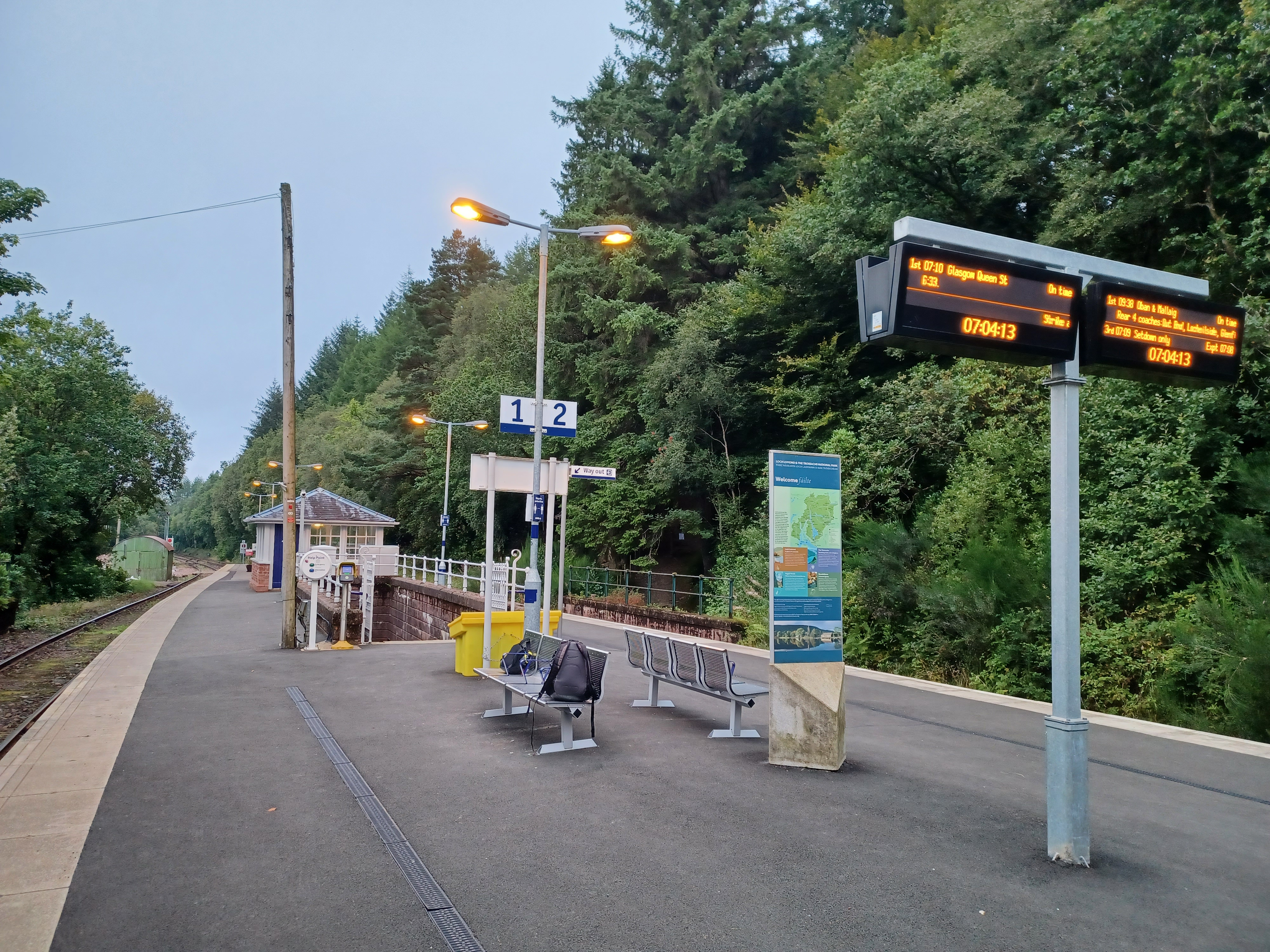
The station seen in 2021

Facilities on the island platform include two waiting rooms, benches, bike racks, a help point and a phone. There is also a car park by the entrance to the station. As the station is only accessible via subway, there is no step-free access. As there are no facilities to purchase tickets, passengers must buy one in advance, or from the guard on the train.

== Passenger volume ==
Passenger volume at Arrochar & Tarbet
	2004–05	2005–06	2006–07	2007–08	2008–09	2009–10	2010–11	2011–12	2012–13	2013–14	2014–15	2015–16	2016–17	2017–18	2018–19	2019–20	2020–21	2021–22	2022–23	2023–24	2024–25
Entries and exits	7,998	9,171	10,067	9,569	10,038	9,012	8,784	9,546	9,232	10,662	13,618	15,236	15,742	17,800	20,192	18,288	3,824	15,400	16,958	21,686	20,438

The statistics cover twelve month periods that start in April.

== Services ==
Monday to Saturday, there are six services to Oban and three to Mallaig (the latter combined with Oban portions, dividing at Crianlarich), and one service to Fort William (the Highland Caledonian Sleeper, weekday mornings only) northbound. Southbound, there are six services to Glasgow Queen Street High Level and one service to London Euston via Queen Street Low Level & Edinburgh Waverley (the Highland Caledonian Sleeper - does not run on Saturday). On Sundays, there are two trains northbound to Mallaig, the Caledonian Sleeper to Fort William and one extra to Oban only, plus an extra summer service to Oban; Southbound there are three trains southbound to Glasgow Queen Street.

Preceding station	National Rail	Following station
Garelochhead	ScotRail; West Highland Line	Ardlui
Garelochhead	Caledonian Sleeper; Highland Caledonian Sleeper	Ardlui
	Historical railways	
Glen Douglas Halt; Line open; Station closed	West Highland Railway; North British Railway	Ardlui; Line and Station open

== Bibliography ==
- Brailsford, Martyn, ed. (December 2017) [1987]. Railway Track Diagrams 1: Scotland & Isle of Man (6th ed.). Frome: Trackmaps. ISBN 978-0-9549866-9-8.
- Butt, R. V. J. (October 1995). The Directory of Railway Stations: details every public and private passenger station, halt, platform and stopping place, past and present (1st ed.). Sparkford: Patrick Stephens Ltd. ISBN 978-1-85260-508-7. OCLC 60251199. OL 11956311M.
- McRae, Andrew (1997). British Railway Camping Coach Holidays: The 1930s & British Railways (London Midland Region). Vol. Scenes from the Past: 30 (Part One). Foxline. ISBN 1-870119-48-7.
- McRae, Andrew (1998). British Railways Camping Coach Holidays: A Tour of Britain in the 1950s and 1960s. Vol. Scenes from the Past: 30 (Part Two). Foxline. ISBN 1-870119-53-3.
- Jowett, Alan (March 1989). Jowett's Railway Atlas of Great Britain and Ireland: From Pre-Grouping to the Present Day (1st ed.). Sparkford: Patrick Stephens Ltd. ISBN 978-1-85260-086-0. OCLC 22311137.
- Jowett, Alan (2000). Jowett's Nationalised Railway Atlas (1st ed.). Penryn, Cornwall: Atlantic Transport Publishers. ISBN 978-0-906899-99-1. OCLC 228266687.
- Quick, Michael (2022). Railway Passenger Stations in Great Britain: A Chronology (PDF) (5th ed.). London: Railway and Canal Historical Society.
