= Glen Falloch Halt railway station =

Former railway station in Scotland

Glen Falloch Halt

General information
- Location: Between Ardlui and Crianlarich, Stirling; Scotland
- Coordinates: 56.341142°N 4.724205°W
- Grid reference: NN31711986
- Platforms: 1

Other information
- Status: Disused

History
- Original company: London and North Eastern Railway

Key dates
- 10 April 1946: Opened
- Circa 1948: Closed
Location

Glen Falloch Halt railway station was a remote rural railway station in Glen Falloch, Stirlingshire, Scotland. Opened in 1946 by the LNER, it was located in Glen Falloch on the Ardlui side of the viaduct, but reported out of use by around 1948.

== History ==
The West Highland Railway opened the line to passengers on 7 August 1894; later it was operated by the North British Railway, until in 1923 it became part of the London and North Eastern Railway. In 1948 the line became part of the Scottish Region of British Railways following nationalisation.

Glen Falloch Halt or Platform had a single platform and was opened by the LNER in 1946, but it closed around 1948. Records show that it was not opened as a standard railway station for the general public and it was not listed in the 1948 British Railways (Scottish Region) timetable. The RCAHMS refer to the halt as being temporary.

Well built 'slab' of concrete construction and a gravel surface, the curved single platform remnants are still present. It had a name board reading 'Glen Falloch', a single lamp for lighting and a small shed was present as a shelter or store. A footpath ran from the halt to the Drovers Inn at Inverarnan.

== Loch Sloy scheme and the WWII Prisoner of War camp ==
After World War II many German and Italian ex-prisoners stayed in Scotland, and it is recorded that a small prisoner of war (POW) camp had been located at Glen Falloch, where a lot of forestry work was carried out. German and Italian POWs had been involved in the early stages of the construction of the Sloy Hydro-Electric facility between Loch Sloy and Inveruglas, on the west bank of Loch Lomond.

Construction at the Loch Sloy project began in May 1945, under the auspices of the North of Scotland Hydro-Electric Board, and it was completed in 1949, dates that largely coincide with the known use of Glen Falloch Halt located near the old POW camp.

Glen Falloch Halt may have been used by men building the aqueducts and tunnels that collected water from the Glen Falloch burns and carried it to Loch Sloy. The near by station of Inveruglas was a similar but larger station with sidings, a passing loop, etc and was built in connection with the Loch Sloy hydroelectric scheme.

The prisoners-of-war were carried from Faslane Platform near Faslane Junction and Whistlefield to Inveruglas or Glen Falloch.

== The West Highland Line ==
| Preceding station | National Rail | Following station |
|---|---|---|
| Crianlarich; Line and station open | North British Railway; West Highland Railway | Ardlui; Line and station open |

== See also ==
- Inveruglas railway station
- Whistlefield railway station
