= Garelochhead railway station =

Railway station in Argyll and Bute, Scotland

Garelochhead Scottish Gaelic: Ceann a' Gheàrrloch
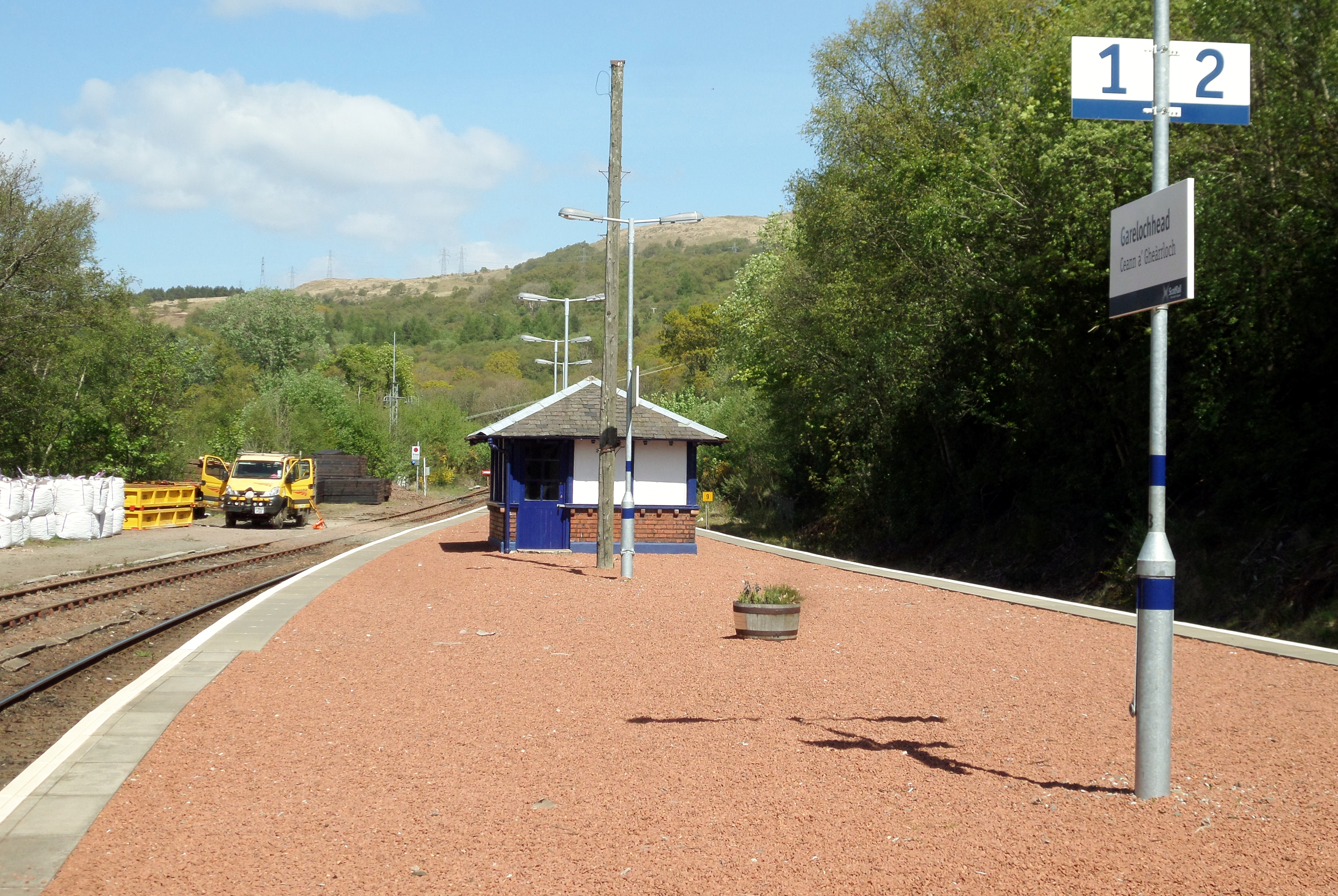
- View north towards Arrochar & Tarbet

General information
- Location: Garelochhead, Argyll and Bute; Scotland
- Coordinates: 56.0801°N 4.8254°W
- Grid reference: NS242910
- Manager: ScotRail
- Transit authority: SPT
- Platforms: 2

Other information
- Station code: GCH
- Fare zone: 7

History
- Original company: West Highland Railway
- Pre-grouping: North British Railway
- Post-grouping: LNER

Key dates
- 7 August 1894: Opened

Passengers
- 2021/22: ▲8,478
- 2022/23: ▲10,030
- 2023/24: ▲13,192
- 2024/25: ▲17,740
- 2025/26: ▲30,884

Listed Building – Category B
- Designated: 8 July 1988
- Reference no.: LB19490
Location
Notes
- Passenger statistics from the Office of Rail and Road

Garelochhead railway station (Scottish Gaelic: Ceann a' Gheàrrloch) is a railway station serving the village of Garelochhead, on the Gare Loch, in Scotland. This station is on the West Highland Line and is a boundary station for SPT. It is sited 8 miles 76 chains (14.4 km) from Craigendoran Junction, near Helensburgh, between Arrochar and Tarbet and Helensburgh Upper. ScotRail manage the station and operate most services, with others provided by Caledonian Sleeper.

== History ==
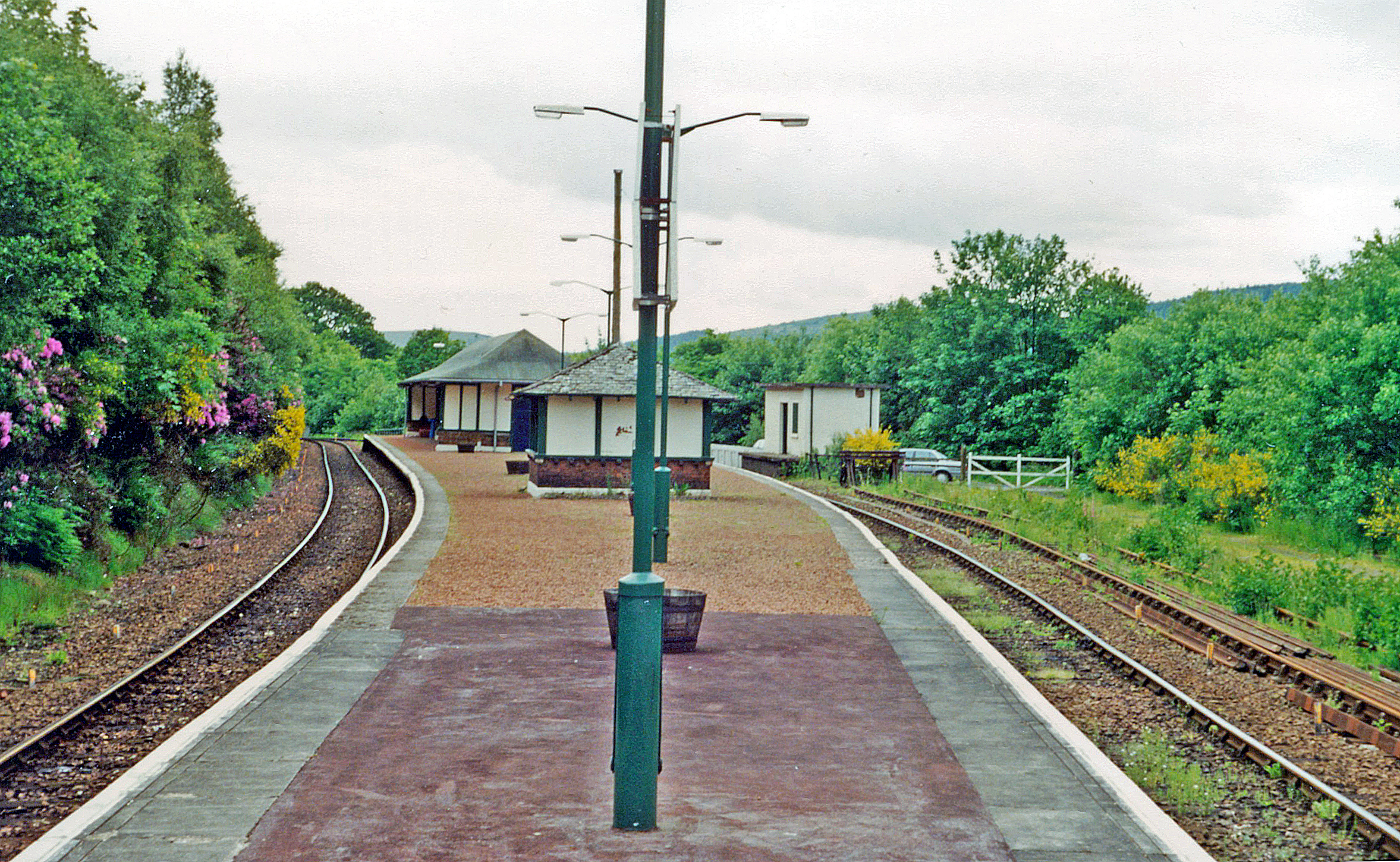
The station seen in 1996. Note the overgrown siding on the right.

This station opened to passengers on 7 August 1894.

The station was laid out with a crossing loop and an island platform. There were sidings on both sides, and a turntable on the west side of the line.

The station was host to a LNER camping coach from 1935 to 1939. A camping coach was also positioned here by the Scottish Region from 1964 to 1967.

Until the 1960s, the station was served by a local shuttle service between Craigendoran and Arrochar & Tarbet in addition to main line trains to Fort William and Mallaig. Latterly operated by a Wickham diesel railbus, it fell victim to the Beeching Axe in June 1964.

In 2021, the Railway Heritage Trust gave a grant for a sewer connection, which could help reopen the station buildings, which have fallen into disuse.

== Facilities ==
The island platform is equipped with benches, a help point, a car park and bike racks, the latter two located outside the station. The only access to the station is via a subway, some steps and a ramp, so the station does not have step-free access. As there are no facilities to purchase tickets, passengers must buy one in advance, or from the guard on the train.

== Passenger volume ==
Passenger volume at Garelochhead
	2004–05	2005–06	2006–07	2007–08	2008–09	2009–10	2010–11	2011–12	2012–13	2013–14	2014–15	2015–16	2016–17	2017–18	2018–19	2019–20	2020–21	2021–22	2022–23	2023–24	2024–25
Entries and exits	4,824	5,940	5,269	5,156	5,374	4,706	5,040	5,122	5,682	5,256	6,920	7,806	8,556	9,796	8,818	8,594	1,678	8,478	10,030	13,192	17,740

The statistics cover twelve month periods that start in April.

== Services ==
Monday to Saturday, there are six services to Oban and three to Mallaig (the latter combined with Oban portions, dividing at Crianlarich), and one service to Fort William (the Highland Caledonian Sleeper, weekday mornings only) northbound. Southbound, there are six services to Glasgow Queen Street High Level and one service to London Euston via Queen Street Low Level & Edinburgh Waverley (the Highland Caledonian Sleeper - does not run on Saturday).

On Sundays, there are two trains northbound to Mallaig, the Caledonian Sleeper to Fort William and one extra to Oban only, plus an extra summer service to Oban; there are three trains southbound to Glasgow Queen Street.

Preceding station	National Rail	Following station
Helensburgh Upper	ScotRail; West Highland Line	Arrochar and Tarbet
Helensburgh Upper	Caledonian Sleeper; Highland Caledonian Sleeper	Arrochar and Tarbet
	Historical railways	
Shandon; Line open; Station closed	West Highland Railway; North British Railway	Whistlefield Halt; Line open; Station closed

== Bibliography ==
- Brailsford, Martyn, ed. (December 2017) [1987]. Railway Track Diagrams 1: Scotland & Isle of Man (6th ed.). Frome: Trackmaps. ISBN 978-0-9549866-9-8.
- Butt, R. V. J. (October 1995). The Directory of Railway Stations: details every public and private passenger station, halt, platform and stopping place, past and present (1st ed.). Sparkford: Patrick Stephens Ltd. ISBN 978-1-85260-508-7. OCLC 60251199. OL 11956311M.
- McRae, Andrew (1997). British Railway Camping Coach Holidays: The 1930s & British Railways (London Midland Region). Vol. Scenes from the Past: 30 (Part One). Foxline. ISBN 1-870119-48-7.
- McRae, Andrew (1998). British Railways Camping Coach Holidays: A Tour of Britain in the 1950s and 1960s. Vol. Scenes from the Past: 30 (Part Two). Foxline. ISBN 1-870119-53-3.
