= Helensburgh Upper railway station =

Railway station in Argyll and Bute, Scotland

Helensburgh Upper Scottish Gaelic: Baile Eilidh Àrd
- The station in 2020

General information
- Location: Helensburgh, Argyll and Bute; Scotland
- Coordinates: 56.0124°N 4.7304°W
- Grid reference: NS298833
- Manager: ScotRail
- Transit authority: SPT
- Platforms: 1

Other information
- Station code: HLU

History
- Original company: West Highland Railway
- Pre-grouping: North British Railway
- Post-grouping: LNER

Key dates
- 7 August 1894: Opened

Passengers
- 2021/22: ▲6,916
- Interchange: ▲1,073
- 2022/23: ▲9,320
- Interchange: ▼737
- 2023/24: ▲11,706
- Interchange: ▲9,827
- 2024/25: ▲12,520
- Interchange: ▲9,926
- 2025/26: ▲12,706
- Interchange: ▼9,039
Location
Notes
- Passenger statistics from the Office of Rail and Road

Helensburgh Upper railway station (Scottish Gaelic: Baile Eilidh Àrd) serves the town of Helensburgh, Scotland, on the north shore of the Firth of Clyde to the west of Glasgow. It is located in a residential area uphill from the town centre and is by far the smaller of the town's two stations. It is on the West Highland Line, 2 miles 8 chains (3.4 km) from Craigendoran Junction, near Helensburgh, the first station on the line before Garelochhead. ScotRail manage the station and operate most services, with others provided by Caledonian Sleeper.

== History ==
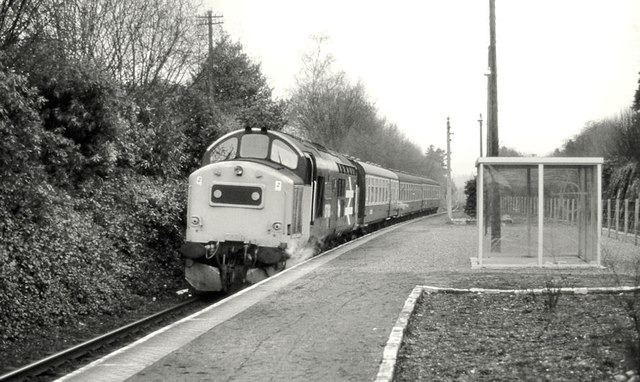
The station seen in 1985

The station opened in 1894.

Originally built with an island platform in a cutting, the Up platform was taken out of use in 1968 although the station building remained in use for another few years. Until the 1960s, the station was served by a local shuttle service between Craigendoran and Arrochar & Tarbet in addition to main line trains to Fort William and Mallaig. Latterly operated by a Wickham diesel railbus, it fell victim to the Beeching Axe in 1964.

== Location ==
The station is within a short walk of the Hill House, built by Charles Rennie Mackintosh and now preserved by the National Trust for Scotland. By using Helensburgh Upper station to visit the Hill House, visitors can avoid the walk uphill from Helensburgh Central railway station. However, Helensburgh Upper has an infrequent train service compared with that available to and from Helensburgh Central.

== Facilities ==
The single platform is equipped with a shelter, a bench, a help point and bike racks. The station has step-free access. As there are no facilities to purchase tickets, passengers must buy one in advance, or from the guard on the train.

== Passenger volume ==
Passenger volume at Helensburgh Upper
	2004–05	2005–06	2006–07	2007–08	2008–09	2009–10	2010–11	2011–12	2012–13	2013–14	2014–15	2015–16	2016–17	2017–18	2018–19	2019–20	2020–21	2021–22	2022–23	2023–24	2024–25
Entries and exits	213	173	600	17,025	22,444	23,294	23,466	14,204	14,072	11,964	15,731	15,127	14,276	14,432	14,046	13,372	1,520	6,916	9,320	11,706	12,520
Interchanges	0	0	0	0	0	0	0	0	0	0	0	0	0	0	0	1,947	285	1,073	737	9,827	9,926

The statistics cover twelve month periods that start in April.

== Services ==
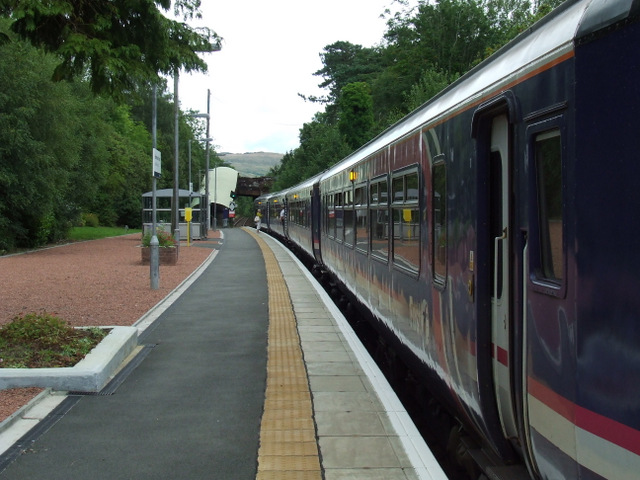
A First ScotRail train at the station in 2013

Monday to Saturday, there are six services to Oban and three to Mallaig (the latter combined with Oban portions, dividing at Crianlarich), and one service to Fort William (the Highland Caledonian Sleeper, weekday mornings only) northbound. Southbound, there are six services to Glasgow Queen Street High Level and one service to London Euston via Queen Street Low Level & Edinburgh Waverley (the Highland Caledonian Sleeper - does not run on Saturday).

On Sundays, there are two trains northbound to Mallaig, the Caledonian Sleeper to Fort William and one extra to Oban only, plus an extra summer service to Oban; there are three trains southbound to Glasgow Queen Street.

Preceding station	National Rail	Following station
Dumbarton Central	ScotRail; West Highland Line	Garelochhead
Dumbarton Central	Caledonian Sleeper; Highland Sleeper	Garelochhead
	Historical railways	
Craigendoran Upper; Line open; Station partially closed	North British Railway; West Highland Railway	Rhu (Row); Line open; Station closed

== Bibliography ==
- Brailsford, Martyn, ed. (December 2017) [1987]. Railway Track Diagrams 1: Scotland & Isle of Man (6th ed.). Frome: Trackmaps. ISBN 978-0-9549866-9-8.
