= Ardlui =

Coordinates: 56°18′08″N 4°43′16″W

Ardlui: Scottish Gaelic: Àird Laoigh
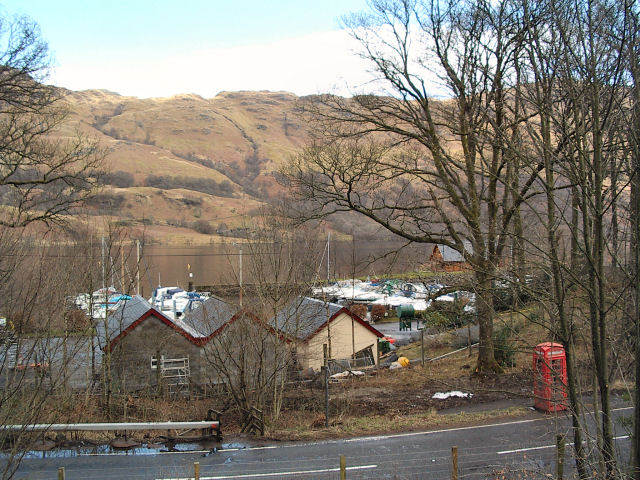
- Ardlui, the marina, and Loch Lomond, seen from Ardlui railway station

- Location within Argyll and Bute
- OS grid reference: NN317152
  - Edinburgh: 64 mi (103 km)
  - London: 380 mi (612 km)
- Council area: Argyll and Bute
- Lieutenancy area: Dunbartonshire
- Country: Scotland
- Sovereign state: United Kingdom
- Post town: ARROCHAR
- Postcode district: G83
- Dialling code: 01301
- Police: Scotland
- Fire: Scottish
- Ambulance: Scottish
- UK Parliament: Argyll, Bute and South Lochaber
- Scottish Parliament: Dumbarton

Ardlui (Scottish Gaelic: Àird Laoigh) is a hamlet in Argyll and Bute, Scottish Highlands. It is located at the head of Loch Lomond. It is on the A82 road between Crianlarich and Glasgow and Ardlui railway station is on the West Highland Line between Glasgow Queen Street and Oban or Fort William.

== History ==
Ardlui lies at the boundary of the ancient kingdoms of the Brythonic Strathclyde, the Gaels of Dalriada and the Picts as indicated by the Clach na Bhreatuinn meaning the "Stone of the Britons" and other local names that indicate a boundary. A battle is said to have taken place in this area between the Briton and the Western Scots in the year 717.

== Ardlui Hotel ==
The hotel at Ardlui was originally built by the local Colquhoun family estate in the early 1800s as a hunting lodge, becoming a hotel in 1886 with extensions added before 1905. A holiday park is located next to the hotel.

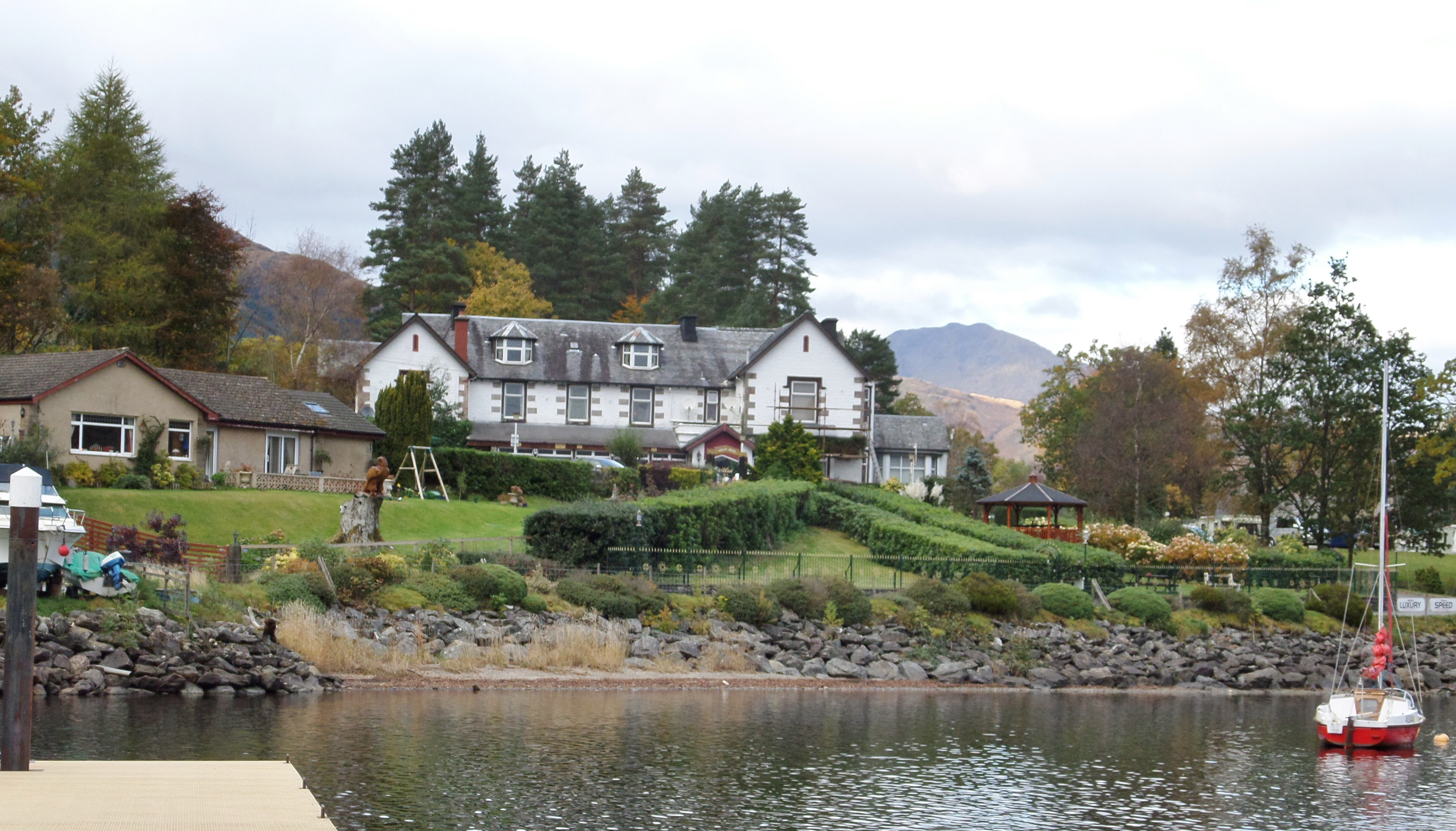
Ardlui Hotel and holiday park

== Ardlui to Ardleish ferry ==
The Ardlui Hotel runs a twelve-person ferry from the pontoon at the Ardlui Marina which carries walkers to the West Highland Way at Ardleish Farm. This service runs throughout the tourist season for all travellers and for hotel guests for the remainder of the year. Potential passengers use a signal hoist at Ardleish to beckon the ferry.

== Inverarnan Canal ==
From 1844 until the mid 1860s steamers called at Ardlui Pier and some continued up the River Falloch to reach Inverarnan at the New Garabal Landing and what is today known as the Drovers Inn via the Inverarnan Canal. Steamers also called at the Old Garabal Landing on the river itself.
