= Lech-a-Vuie Platform railway station =

Former railway station in Scotland

Lech-a-Vuie Platform
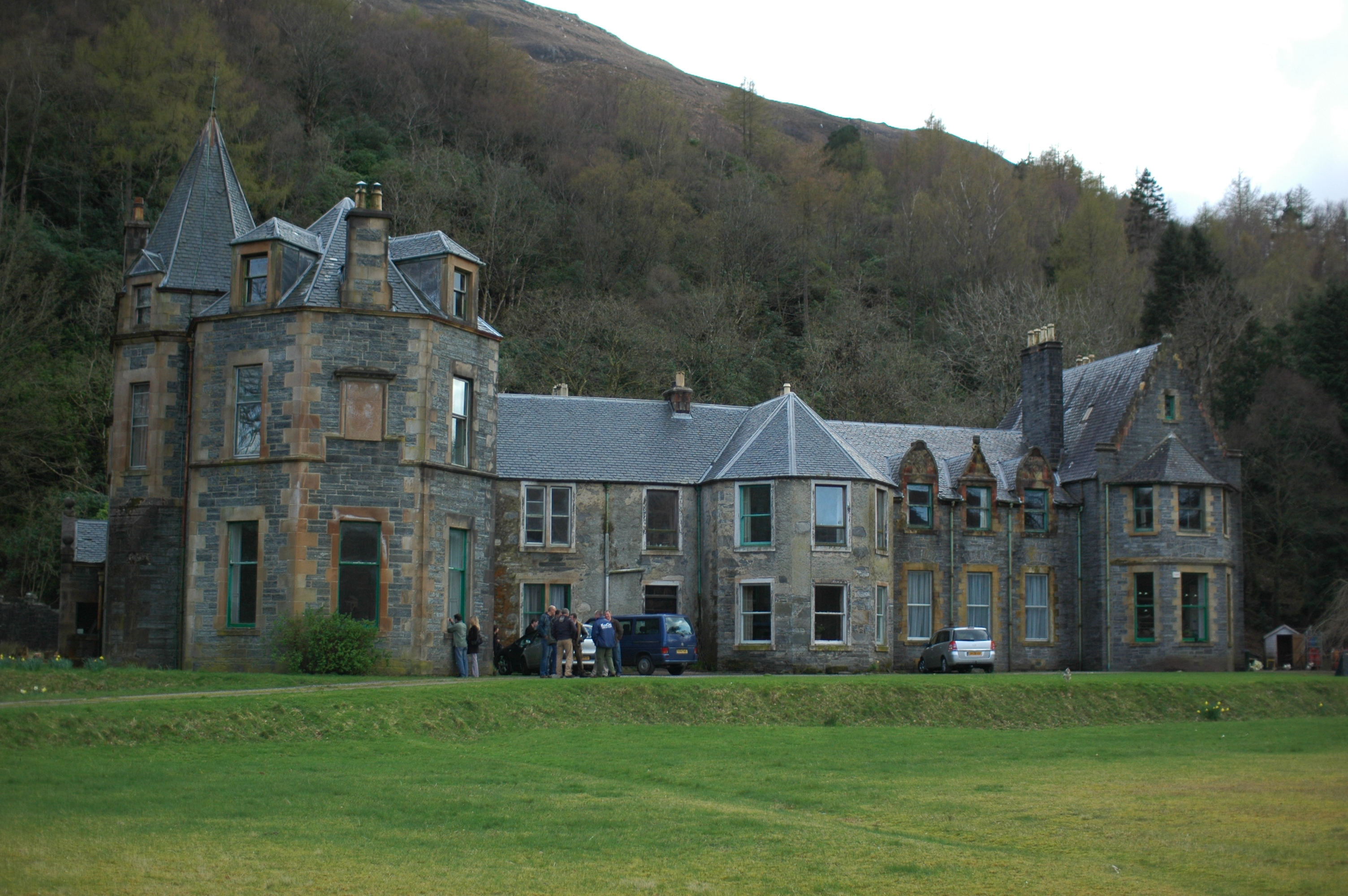
- Inverailort House

General information
- Location: Near Glenfinnan, Highland; Scotland
- Coordinates: 56.874°N 5.513°W
- Grid reference: NM860813
- Platforms: 1

Other information
- Status: Disused

History
- Original company: West Highland Railway
- Pre-grouping: North British Railway
- Post-grouping: LNER

Key dates
- 1 April 1901: Opened
- After 1970: Closed
Location

Lech-a-Vuie Platform railway station (NM860813), Lechavuie or Lech-a-Vute was not constructed for public use. It stood close to the A830 road to the east of Loch Eilt near the Allt-a-Ghiughais burn and below Doire Dhamh on the West Highland Railway's extension to Mallaig. It stood in between the still extant Glenfinnan and Lochailort stations. At first it only served the needs of shooting parties on the Inverailort Estate owned by the Common-Head family, however it was later used by the army and navy during WWII and closed in the 1970s. Lech-a-vuie was 18.5 miles (30 km) from Mallaig Junction and stood at the summit of the line at a height of 379 feet (115.5 metres).

== Infrastructure and working ==
The OS maps Sheet 61 of 1902 for Arisaig shows only a single short platform on the northern side of the railway line on a straight section of track with a short footpath leading to the nearby road. The 1908 map also marks the 'Platform' however by 1928 it is no longer annotated or drawn. No sidings or signalling are indicated.

The NBR 'Internal Notice' recorded that "A small platform has been erected 17 miles 15 chains from Banavie Junction, between Glenfinnan and Lochailort, for the purpose of enabling Sporting Parties, visiting Mrs Head of Kinlochailort to leave or join the trains. In all cases, when passengers require to be set down or taken up, previous intimation must be made to the station master at Lochailort, and it will be his duty to instruct the Driver and Guard in the case of trains going in the fort William direction, and to telephone the Stationmaster at Glenfinnan, in the case of trains going in the direction of Mallaig. Parties using the platform must pay the fares to the station beyond, and the Guard must collect the tickets from those alighting, while those to be taken up must previously possess themselves of tickets before the train arrives."

The station may have had no lighting as the railway rule book stated that "Trains must only call at the platform between sunrise and sunset."

== History ==
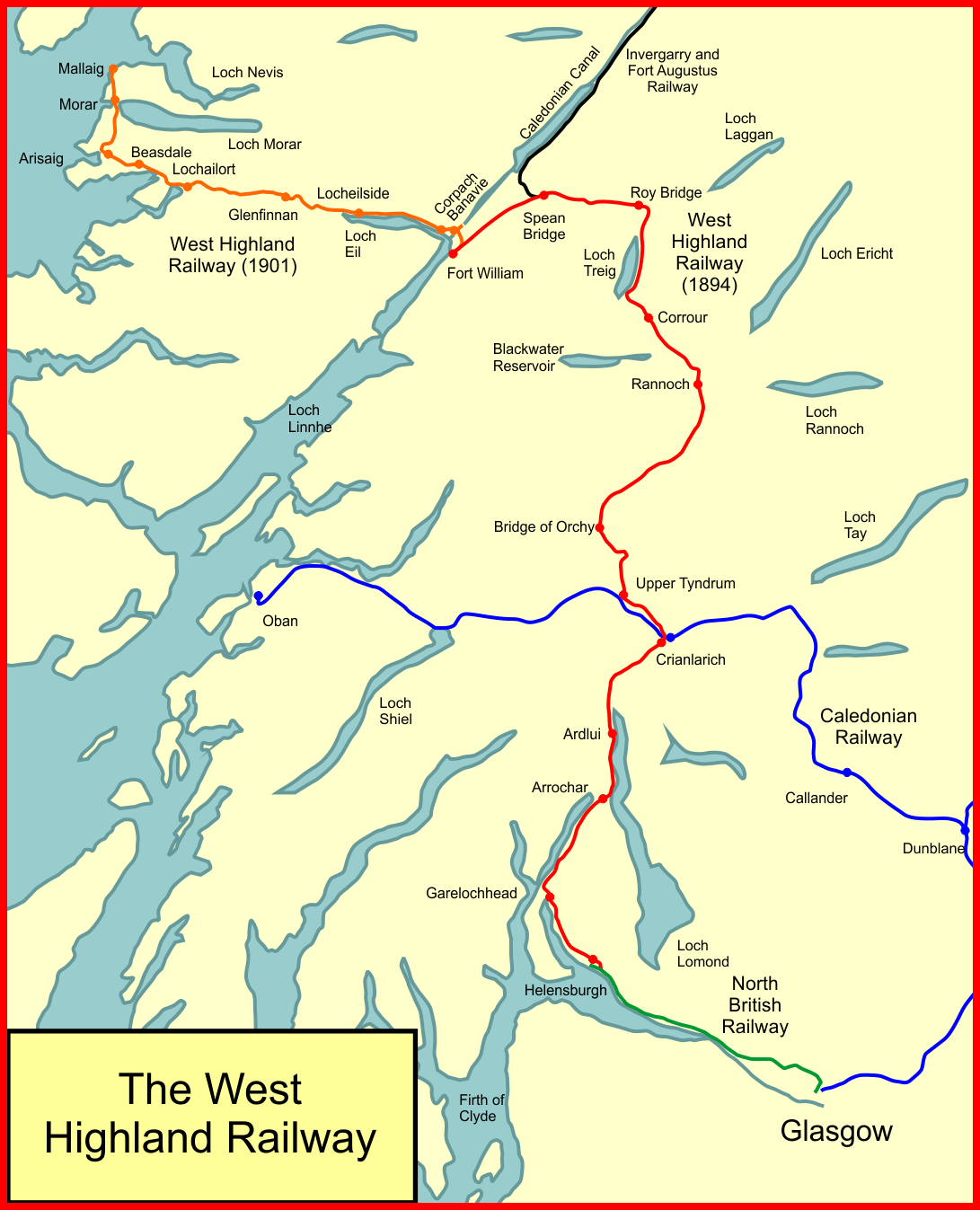
System map of the West Highland Railway

The Scottish Gaelic name may have been 'Leac a' Mhuidhe', meaning 'slab of the churn'. The nearby tunnels are recorded as 'Leachabhuidh' which may have resulted in the anglicised spelling 'Lech-a-Vuie'. As stated it was a private halt used by shooting parties on the large Inverailort Estate owned at the time by the Cameron-Head family. It is recorded that the construction was linked to the agreement to sell the land as was so often the case as with Corrour for example.

Inside Inverailort House is the official plaque that commemorates the Inverailort Estate's role and significance as a Special Training Centre established here in 1940, the operations of which subsequently combined with other units to form the Commandos, and later as the Royal Marines Commando base. It was during this time that Lech-a-Vuie Platform took on a new role in relation to the training exercises for the forces personnel.

The house and Inverailort Estate's 12,000 acres were requisitioned for the war effort by the government and used as a base by David Stirling and Lord Lovat. A camp with barracks and an assault course was built for the 3,000 or so commandos that were trained here. In 1945 the estate was returned to the Cameron-Head family. Sporting use of the platform continued after 1945 and continued into the 1970s.

== The site today ==
The railway line to Mallaig from Fort William is in daily use for passengers traffic and the remains of the path from the platform site to the A830 are visible as a low facing wall.

== See also ==
- Glenfalloch Halt railway station
- Gorton
- Mossgiel Tunnel Platform railway station

Preceding station	National Rail	Following station
Glenfinnan	ScotRail; West Highland Line	Lochailort
	Historical railways	
Glenfinnan; Line and Station open	North British Railway; Mallaig Extension Railway of West Highland Railway	Lochailort; Line and Station open
