= Crianlarich railway station =

Railway station in Stirling, Scotland

Crianlarich Scottish Gaelic: A' Chrìon-Làraich
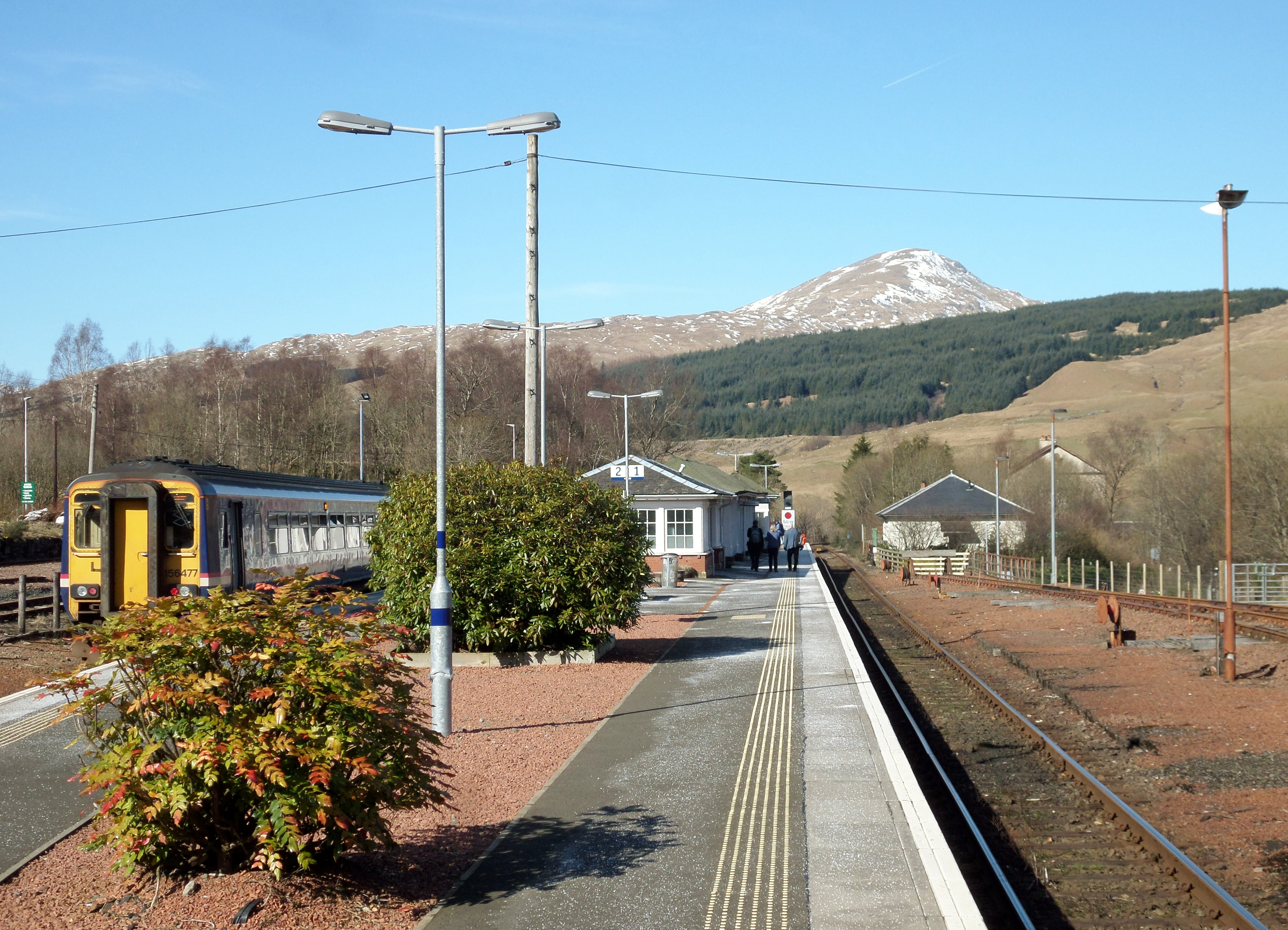
- Looking north towards Tyndrum

General information
- Location: Crianlarich, Stirling; Scotland
- Coordinates: 56.3903°N 4.6185°W
- Grid reference: NN384251
- Manager: ScotRail
- Platforms: 2

Other information
- Station code: CNR

History
- Original company: West Highland Railway
- Pre-grouping: North British Railway
- Post-grouping: LNER

Key dates
- 7 August 1894: Opened
- 1953: Suffix "Upper" added to station name.
- After 1965: Suffix "Upper" removed from station name.

Passengers
- 2021/22: ▲11,030
- Interchange: ▲27,662
- 2022/23: ▲13,370
- Interchange: ▲64,981
- 2023/24: ▲16,108
- Interchange: ▼3,801
- 2024/25: ▲16,156
- Interchange: ▲4,000
- 2025/26: ▲17,662
- Interchange: ▲4,465
Location
Notes
- Passenger statistics from the Office of Rail and Road

Crianlarich railway station is a railway station serving the village of Crianlarich in Scotland. It is located on the West Highland Line, sited 41 miles 25 chains (66.5 km) from Craigendoran Junction, near Helensburgh, with Ardlui to the south, and Tyndrum Lower and Upper Tyndrum to the north west, on the routes to Oban and Mallaig respectively, which diverge immediately north of the station. ScotRail, who manage the station, operate most services (along with Caledonian Sleeper).

== History ==
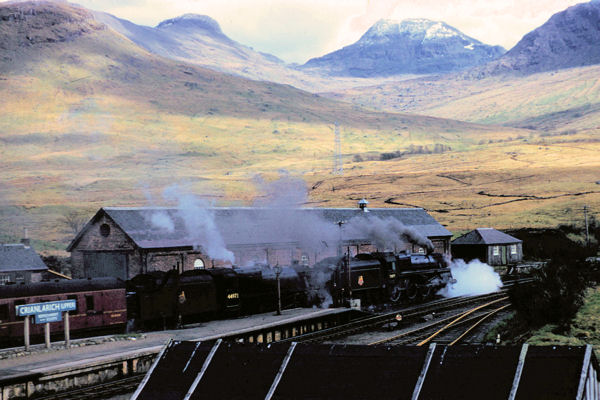
Crianlarich (Upper) station in 1957

Crianlarich station opened concurrently with the West Highland Railway on 7 August 1894, doubling the number of railway stations in the village.

The station was host to a LNER camping coach from 1937 to 1939.

In 1951, British Rail added the suffix "Upper" to the station's name, in order to distinguish it from the nearby station (only about 330-yard (300 m) walk along the north east access road) on the Callander and Oban Line which then became known as Crianlarich Lower. Crianlarich Lower station closed on 28 September 1965, and on 1 November 1965 the Upper station's name reverted to "Crianlarich".

The late 19th century 13-bay brick engine shed still stands and Historic Scotland have designated it as a category C listed building.

== Facilities ==
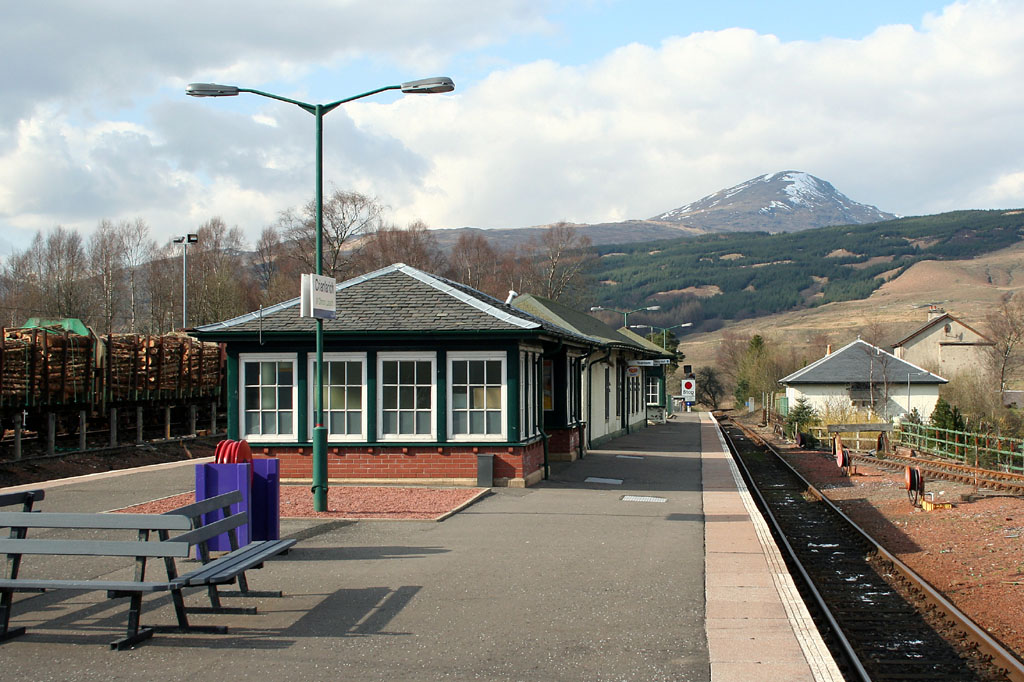
The station buildings from the south

The station is equipped with a waiting room, benches, an accessible toilet and bike racks. Access to the platform is via a flight of stairs from a subway that runs underneath the tracks, from two car parks. As there are no facilities to purchase tickets, passengers must buy one in advance, or from the guard on the train.

== Passenger volume ==
There has consistently been more than 10,000 entries and exits recorded every year since data has been published 16,000 being typical from 2011. During the COVID-19 pandemic of 2020 they dropped to fewer than 2,500 but were about 16,000 again by 2023.

Passengers by year
Year (Note: The passenger data covers twelve month periods that start in April.)	Entries and exits (Note: Entries and exits are the number of people starting or finishing their journey here.)	Interchanges (Note: Interchanges are estimated for people changing between Oban and Fort William/Mallaig services.)
2004–05	10,576	76,886
2005–06	10,464	925
2006–07	10,587	3,781
2007–08	11,163	10,942
2008–09	10,700	1,630
2009–10	11,820	2,567
2010–11	13,544	2,149
2011–12	16,666	1,319
2012–13	15,276	1,347
2013–14	13,040	20,491
2014–15	16,752	1,619
2015–16	16,726	1,466
2016–17	16,672	1,775
2017–18	17,586	3,666
2018–19	16,960	11,085
2019–20	14,250	37,641
2020–21	2,428	7,388
2021–22	11,030	27,662
2022–23	13,370	64,981
2023–24	16,108	3,801
2024–25	16,156	4,000

== Services ==
Northbound, Crianlarich is where the combined trains for Oban and Mallaig divide; the two services then leave roughly five minutes apart. Southbound, when each train arrives from Oban or Mallaig, it joins with the other and they go down as one train from Crianlarich.

On weekdays and Saturdays, there are a total of seven southbound ScotRail trains to Glasgow Queen Street. Northbound, there are three trains which divide, with portions to go to Oban and Mallaig, as well as three trains which only go to Oban. On Sundays, there are three services to Oban and two to Mallaig, and there are three trains to Glasgow Queen Street. On summer Sundays, there is an extra train each way between Glasgow and Oban.

The Caledonian Sleeper runs southbound to London Euston on Sunday and weekday nights, and northbound to Fort William on weekday and Saturday mornings. The Sleeper conveys seats for regular passengers as far as Edinburgh.

Preceding station	National Rail	Following station
Ardlui	ScotRail; West Highland Line	Tyndrum Lower
Ardlui	ScotRail; West Highland Line	Upper Tyndrum
Ardlui	Caledonian Sleeper; Highland Caledonian Sleeper	Upper Tyndrum
	Historical railways	
Ardlui; Line open; Station open	West Highland Railway; North British Railway	Tyndrum; Line open; Station open
Southern end of link line	Callander and Oban Railway; Crianlarich Link Line; Operated by Caledonian Railway	Tyndrum Lower; Line open; Station open

== Bibliography ==
- Butt, R. V. J. (October 1995). The Directory of Railway Stations: details every public and private passenger station, halt, platform and stopping place, past and present (1st ed.). Sparkford: Patrick Stephens Ltd. ISBN 978-1-85260-508-7. OCLC 60251199. OL 11956311M.
- Jowett, Alan (March 1989). Jowett's Railway Atlas of Great Britain and Ireland: From Pre-Grouping to the Present Day (1st ed.). Sparkford: Patrick Stephens Ltd. ISBN 978-1-85260-086-0. OCLC 22311137.
