= Loch Sloy Hydro-Electric Scheme =

Hydroelectric power station in Scotland

Sloy Dam
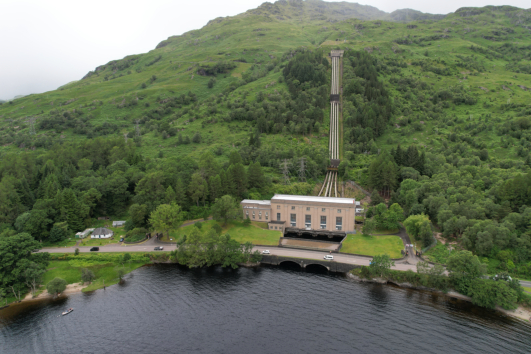
- Sloy Power Station

- Location within Scotland
- Country: Scotland
- Location: Argyll and Bute
- Coordinates: 56.2615°N 4.7636°W
- Purpose: Power
- Status: Operational
- Construction began: 1945
- Opening date: 1950
- Owner: SSE

Dam and spillways
- Type of dam: buttressed
- Impounds: Inveruglas Water
- Height: 56 m (184 ft)
- Length: 357 m (1,171 ft)
- Spillways: 1
- Spillway type: fixed

Reservoir
- Creates: Loch Sloy (reservoir)
- Total capacity: 36 million cubic metres

Sloy Power Station
- Coordinates: 56°15′04″N 4°42′42″W
- Commission date: 1950
- Installed capacity: 152.5 MW
- Website; Official Website

The Loch Sloy Hydro-Electric Scheme is a hydro-electric facility situated between Loch Sloy and Inveruglas on the west bank of Loch Lomond in Scotland. It is also within the Arrochar Alps. The site was originally suggested as the location of a huge pumped-storage scheme in 1936 by Edward MacColl, but this was rejected as being uneconomic. After the North of Scotland Hydro-Electric Board was created in 1943, it became the first of their proposed schemes. Its start was delayed due to objections which resulted in a public enquiry being held, which authorised the scheme in 1945.

Construction was further delayed by a chronic shortage of labour and appalling weather. A massive buttress dam was used to raise the level of Loch Sloy, and the power station was built on the banks of Loch Lomond. The two were connected by a tunnel through Ben Vorlich and surface pipes nearer to the power station. The catchment for Loch Sloy was increased significantly, by building a network of pipes, tunnels and open aqueducts to capture water from surrounding streams. When they were installed in 1950, the four generator sets were the largest installed in Britain. Electricity generation began in February 1950, and there was an official opening ceremony in October, when Queen Elizabeth The Queen Mother officiated. Historic Scotland has designated the power-station building and the dam as listed buildings. A plaque in the power station commemorates the 21 men who died during the construction, and the facility is operated by Scottish and Southern Energy.

== History ==
Loch Sloy is a relatively small loch located to the west of Loch Lomond and around 800 feet (240 m) above it. The engineer Edward MacColl was asked to look at the possibility of using it for a hydro-electric scheme in 1936, while working for the Central Electricity Board. However, rather than a conventional arrangement, he considered that it was suitable for a huge pumped-storage scheme, which would have been much larger than any of the existing schemes in Scotland. He called it a "reversible hydraulic station", which would pump water from Loch Lomond to Loch Sloy during the night, and use the water to generate electricity at times when the demand was highest. He envisaged eight turbines, with a total capacity of 360 MW. The site was visited by the Board's Technical Development Committee in 1937, and a revised scheme was devised, using dams and aqueducts to increase the catchment of the loch, by collecting water from neighbouring catchments. The new power station would then only need four pumps, but even this was still deemed to be uneconomic, and the idea was abandoned.

The North of Scotland Hydro-Electric Board was created by the Hydro-Electric Development (Scotland) Act of 1943. Its first chairman was Lord Airlie, while MacColl became his deputy. Their first duty was to produce a list of potential sites where water power could be implemented, and MacColl's list showed 102 possible schemes, from quite small schemes to enormous ones. Much of this was based on a report that he had previously submitted to the Hilleary Committee in the late 1930s. For the original report, he had worked with J Henderson to catalogue the water resources of the Highlands, and with James Williamson to work out how the electricity could be generated and distributed. Williamson subsequently became one of the five consulting engineers who formed a Panel of Technical Advisers for the new Board.

With both MacColl and Williamson having a good knowledge of the potential of Loch Sloy, this became the Board's first constructional scheme. It had many advantages for a first scheme. Rainfall was high, at around 120 inches (3,000 mm) per year, and the catchment did not contain any houses or agricultural land. Inveruglas Water, which ran from Loch Sloy to Loch Lomond, passed through a gorge which was a suitable site for a dam, while there was flat land next to Loch Lomond on which to build a power station. There were no issues with fishing rights, because of the nature of Inveruglas Water, and nearby Clydeside provided a ready market for the power generated. The scheme was less complex than MacColl's 1936 proposal, with no pumped storage and a capacity of 130 MW. When laid before Parliament, two smaller projects were included, at Kyle of Lochalsh and Loch Morar, which demonstrated the Board's commitment to supplying remote areas where it would normally be uneconomic to do so. £4.1 million of the total cost of £4.6 million was allocated for the Loch Sloy scheme.

The Board had hoped that the passage of the scheme through Parliament would be reasonably smooth, but most of the objections that had been used to stop hydro-electric development in the 1930s were raised again. There were formal objections from Dumbarton County Council, the Clyde Valley Regional Planning Advisory Committee, the Joint County Council of Perth and Kinross, Perth County Council, Inverness County Council and some private individuals. The Secretary of State decided that a public enquiry was necessary, and this was held in Edinburgh at the end of 1944, with John Cameron KC acting as chairman. It took six days, and the Board's case was not helped by the fact that they had moved the site for the power station after publishing the original plans, and had failed to secure agreement from the Ministry of War Transport over the need to reroute the Loch Lomond trunk road around the site of the power station. Three of the County Councils withdrew their objection while the hearing was taking place, but Dumbarton pursued their cause relentlessly. However, Cameron eventually decided that their plans for future development in the area were too optimistic and speculative to be realistic, and that the Board's contention that the scheme was in the public interest was correct. Accordingly, the scheme was authorised on 28 March 1945.

=== Construction ===
The scheme was expected to be operational by 1947, but it soon became apparent that this was not achievable. Margaret Johnston, the wife of Tom Johnston, the architect of the 1943 Act, "cut the first sod" on 11 June 1945 using an 18-ton bulldozer, rather than the traditional polished spade, but activity soon stopped, due to an inability to find a workforce in the immediate post-war period. German prisoners-of-war were allocated to the job, and by the end of the year, there were 45 British men and 398 prisoners-of-war working on the scheme. They built access roads across the hills, camps for the workers, and railway facilities, including a bridge over the main pipelines for the West Highland Railway.

Aggregate for the construction of the dam at the southern end of Loch Sloy was obtained from a quarry opened at Coiregrogain, and moved to the dam by a 1.75-mile (2.8 km) conveyor system. Sand was obtained from Balloch at the southern end of Loch Lomond, and was moved along the loch using two tugs, each pulling three dumb barges loaded with 50 tons of sand, to an unloading point at Inveruglas Bay. Obtaining Portland cement also proved difficult, as no local suppliers could handle the quantities needed. An aerial cableway was constructed over the dam site, to allow concrete to be deposited anywhere it was needed, and a 3.6 MW diesel power station was built to provide power for the project. Shortages of materials continued into 1948, and the whole project was slowed down by appalling weather.

The dam was a massive buttress dam, designed by Williamson, and had the advantage that it used around 20 per cent less concrete than a solid gravity dam. It is some 1,171 feet (357 m) long and 184 feet (56 m) high, and when completed raised the surface level of Loch Sloy by 155 feet (47 m) when the loch is full. This provides a head of 909 feet (277 m) to the turbines. The main tunnel was driven through Ben Vorlich, and runs for 10,000 feet (3,000 m). It is mainly of horseshoe section, with a maximum diameter of 15 feet 4 inches (4.67 m), and was driven from four faces. At the Loch Lomond end, it splits into two steel lined tunnels, of 10 feet (3.0 m) diameter, and then as it emerges from the mountain, splits again into four 7-foot (2.1 m) diameter pipes, which enter the valve house. The tunnel was constructed by Edmund Nuttall, who also constructed a large surge shaft inside the mountain, some 1,000 feet (300 m) from the tunnel exit.

From the valve house, four pipes run down to the power station. The internal diameter of the pipes gradually decreases, from 7 feet (2.1 m) to just over 6 feet (1.8 m) where they enter the power station. They were erected by Sir William Arrol & Co., who fabricated the welded pipes in Glasgow. The sections were 24 feet (7.3 m) long and were delivered by rail. They were moved up the hillside by an electric inclined railway, and rivetted together. The contract was completed late, due to a chronic shortage of steel and very wet weather, but by 1950 Arrol had joined the power station to the valve house, some 1,500 feet (460 m) away. The power station building was designed by the Edinburgh architects Tarbolton & Ochterlony. Harold Tarbolton was an architectural advisor for the North of Scotland Hydro-Electric Board. Following Matthew Ochterlony's death in 1946, the scheme was progressed by Tarbolton, but he died in July 1947, and his architectural practice managed the construction subsequently.

The building was constructed by Hugh Leggat, who were faced with incessant rain during 1947 and 1948, and a mass exodus of workers in 1947, who were not happy with working conditions or the quality of the food in the camps. The turbines were supplied by English Electric, and transport to site presented many problems. The spiral casings weighed 42 tons and were much larger than was normally permitted on roads. The rotors for the alternators weighed 85 tons, and railway vehicles had to be specially adapted to carry them. When they arrived at the power station, there were no cranes big enough to unload them, and jacks had to be used. All four turbines had been installed by 1950, and they were at the time the largest generator sets installed in Britain. Three are rated at 40 MW and one at 32.5 MW, giving a total capacity of 152.5 MW.

=== Catchment ===
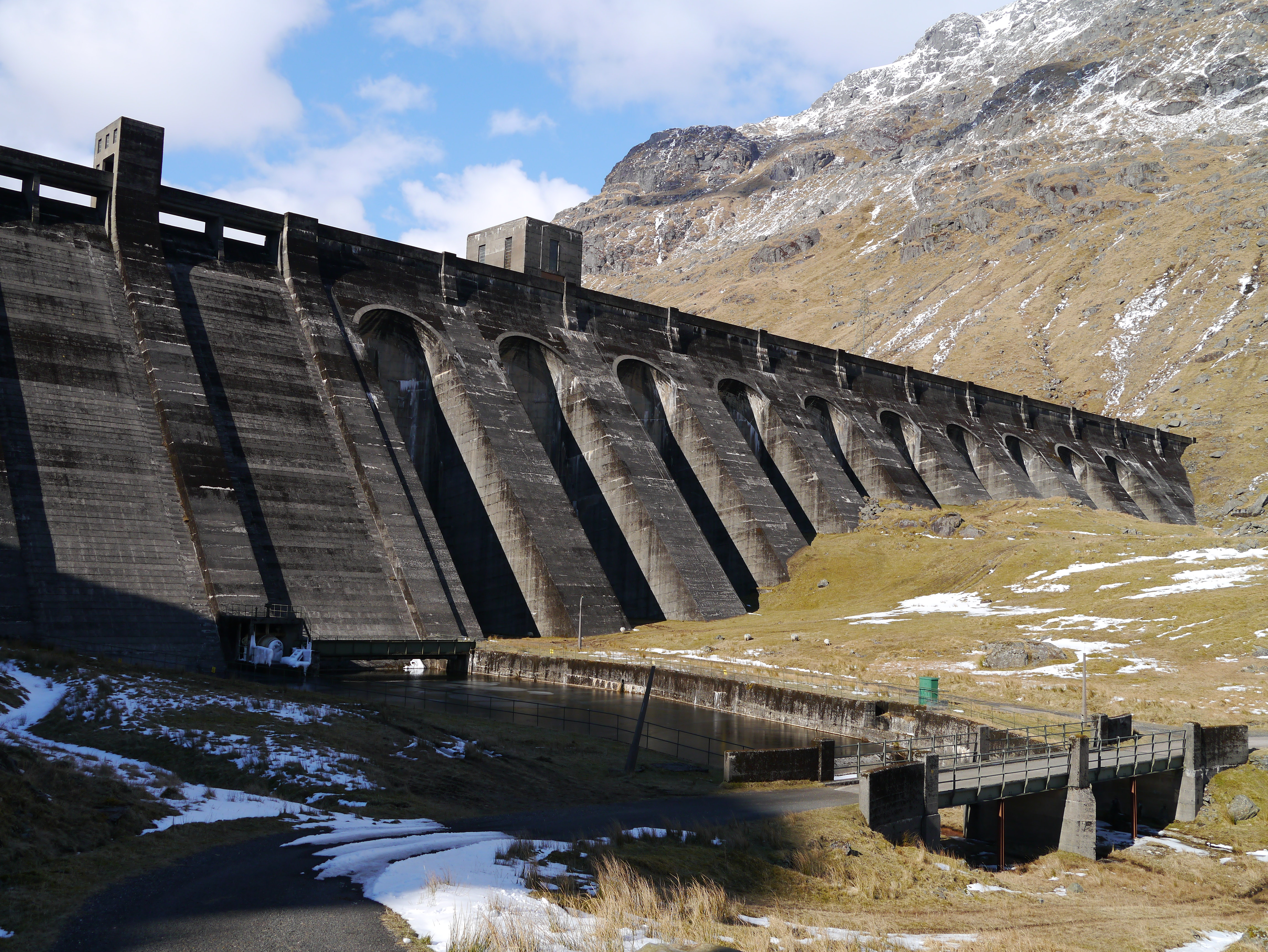
The dam that impounds Loch Sloy

Prior to work starting, the catchment area for Loch Sloy was around 6.5 square miles (17 km^{2}). When the construction scheme was published, it anticipated that this would be increased to some 28 square miles (73 km^{2}), but in 1948, the Board published the Loch Sloy extension scheme, which was officially Constructional Scheme No.22, and this extended the catchment further to 32.5 square miles (84 km^{2}). This was to be achieved by the construction of a network of pipes and open aqueducts, totalling around 10 miles (16 km) and a further 12 miles (19 km) of small diameter tunnels. Nuttall had completed the main tunnel by early 1949, and teams of men spread out over the uplands to construct these structures. Balfour Beatty assisted with the aqueducts to join up the tunnels. Unlike the high-profile dam, main tunnel and power station, this attracted little attention in the press, although one event did. In January 1951, a total of 278 feet (85 m) of tunnel was completed which had been driven in seven days by tunnellers working three eight-hour shifts per day, and this set a new British record for the distance driven in a week from a single heading. This was exceeded on 10 June 1951, when tunnellers excavated 427 feet (130 m) of tunnel in a week.

Starting from the south, a dam was constructed on Allt a' Bhalachain, which flows into Loch Long. A pipeline runs to another dam on Allt Sugach, which again flows into Loch Long via Loin Water. A tunnel then carries the water to the north-west, where it is joined by another tunnel which captures the headwaters of a tributary of Croe Water, which would otherwise empty into Loch Long. This then links to two dams on the upper reaches of Allt Coiregrogan and its tributaries, capturing water that would have flowed into Loch Lomond via Inveruglas Water. The tunnel empties into Loch Sloy. To the east of Loch Sloy, the Allt Ardvorlich flows into Loch Lomond, and much of its flow has been captured by an intake, from where it joins the main tunnel just above the valve house.

To the west of Loch Sloy, the Allt a' Chnoic naturally flows into the loch. Its flow has been supplemented by a dam on Allt Uaine, which feeds into a pipeline to reach Allt a' Chnoic. Allt Uaine flows into Loch Fyne via Kinglas Water. Tributaries of the River Fyne are captured by two dams on the Garbh-allt Beag and two more on the Garbh-allt Mor. A pipeline runs to a dam on a tributary of the Eas Riachain and a second dam on the main Eas Riachain, where there is an intake. A tunnel runs to the north east to reach the Eas an Tuirc, where there is a dam and another on a tributary. The tunnel continues to the east to empty into the Allt a' Chnoic.

The rest of the system captures water that would otherwise flow into Loch Lomond, either directly or via the River Falloch. A tunnel runs from an unnamed stream that flows into Loch Lomond near the hamlet of Ardlui. The tunnel heads northwards to Srath Dubh-Uisge, where six dams and an aqueduct are shown on the southern slopes of the valley, connecting to six tributaries. The aqueduct discharges into an open channel that flows into the northern end of Loch Sloy. From the outlet, another pipeline runs along the northern slopes of the valley, collecting water from another six tributaries. A tunnel running northwards connects it to three intakes on tributaries of the Allt Arnan, and continues northwards to Gleann nan Caorann, the valley of Dubh Eas. There are a large number of intakes on the southern slopes of the valley, a pipeline running northwards to a dam on the Dubh Eas, and further intakes and a dam on the north side of the valley.

While all this was going on, another team of men were erecting pylons to carry the 132 kV lines from the switching station at Inveruglas to Windyhill, on the outskirts of Glasgow. Machinery sank into the peat bogs on the route from Loch Lomond to Loch Long, and had to be abandoned. A workforce of 200 was required over the two year contract, and because of the high turnover of men, 1,285 men were employed during that time. Despite the difficulties, the contract for the power lines was completed on time.

=== Opening ===
On 18 February 1950, Sir Edward MacColl, who had only recently been knighted, switched on the first generator set at Sloy at 3:15 pm. Residents of Tarbet, further south on Loch Lomond, and at Arrochar on Loch Long, had been supplied with electricity from the temporary diesel generating station since April 1948, when Miss Mary MacFarlane, the oldest resident of the village, aged 96, had switched on the new supply. The official opening ceremony took place on 18 October 1950 and was performed by Queen Elizabeth. Despite the cold and wet weather, and the fact that guests had to wait around for a long time, MacColl had ensured they were not cold by installing an electric light bulb underneath every seat, despite many arguing against the idea.

Historic Scotland has designated the modernist power-station building and the dam as listed buildings of categories A and B respectively. Twenty-one men lost their lives during the construction. They are commemorated on a plaque located in the main power station building.

The facility is operated by Scottish and Southern Energy, and is normally in standby mode, ready to generate electricity to meet sudden peaks in demand. It can reach full capacity within 5 minutes from a standing start.
