= Craigendoran railway station =

Railway station in Argyll and Bute, Scotland

Craigendoran Scottish Gaelic: Creag an Dòbhrain
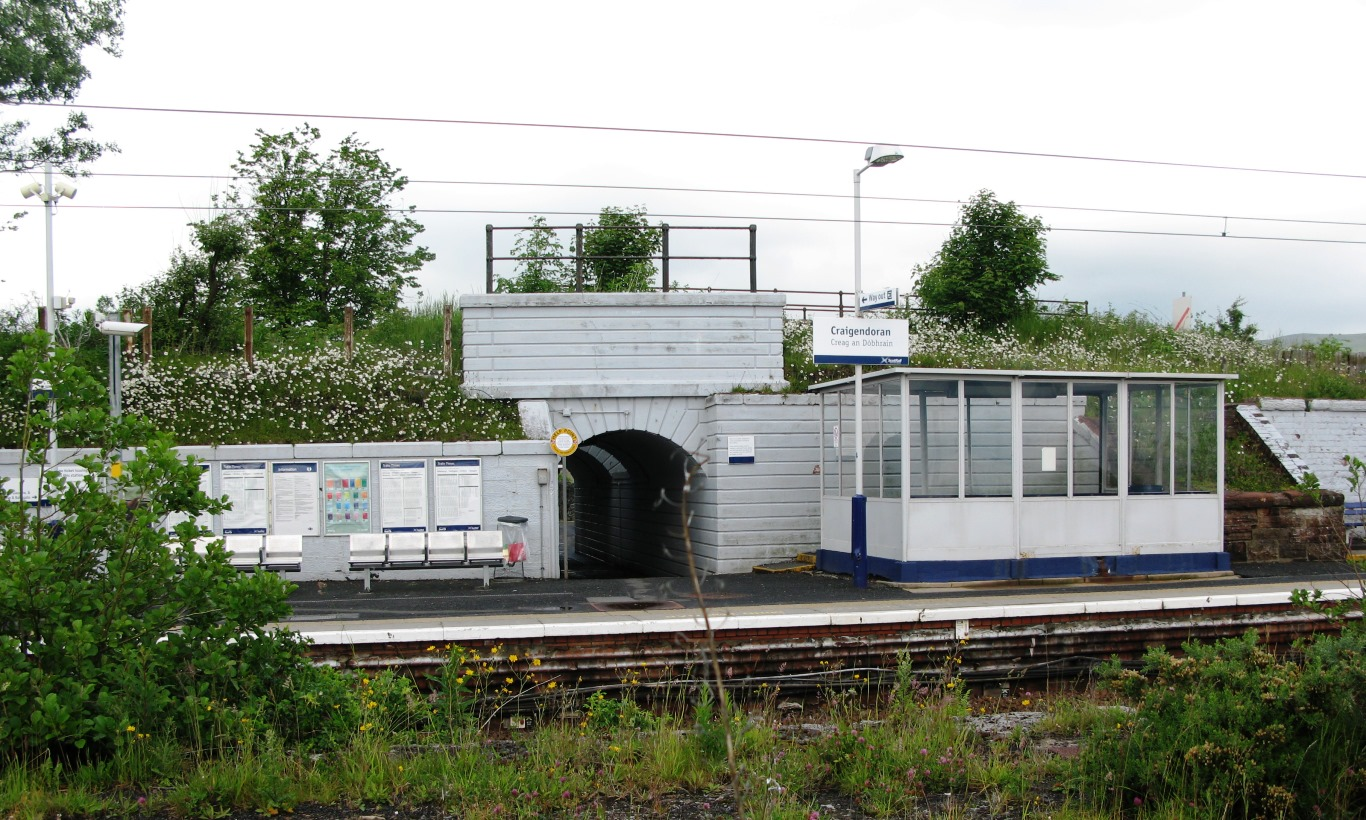
- The North Clyde Line platform with the embankment for the West Highland Line behind

General information
- Location: Helensburgh, Argyll and Bute; Scotland
- Coordinates: 55.9949°N 4.7120°W
- Grid reference: NS309813
- Manager: ScotRail
- Transit authority: SPT
- Platforms: 1

Other information
- Station code: CGD
- Fare zone: D4

Key dates
- 15 May 1882: Opened

Passengers
- 2021/22: ▲0.123 million
- 2022/23: ▲0.142 million
- 2023/24: ▲0.154 million
- 2024/25: ▲0.164 million
- 2025/26: ▼0.163 million
Location
Notes
- Passenger statistics from the Office of Rail and Road

Craigendoran railway station (Scottish Gaelic: Creag an Dòbhrain) is a railway station serving Craigendoran, east of Helensburgh, Scotland. The station is managed by ScotRail, which operates all services at the station. It is located on the North Clyde Line between Helensburgh Central and Cardross, 23 miles 18 chains (37.4 km) west of Glasgow Queen Street (High Level), measured via Singer and Maryhill. West Highland Line trains used to call here but no longer do following the closure of the upper platforms.

== History ==
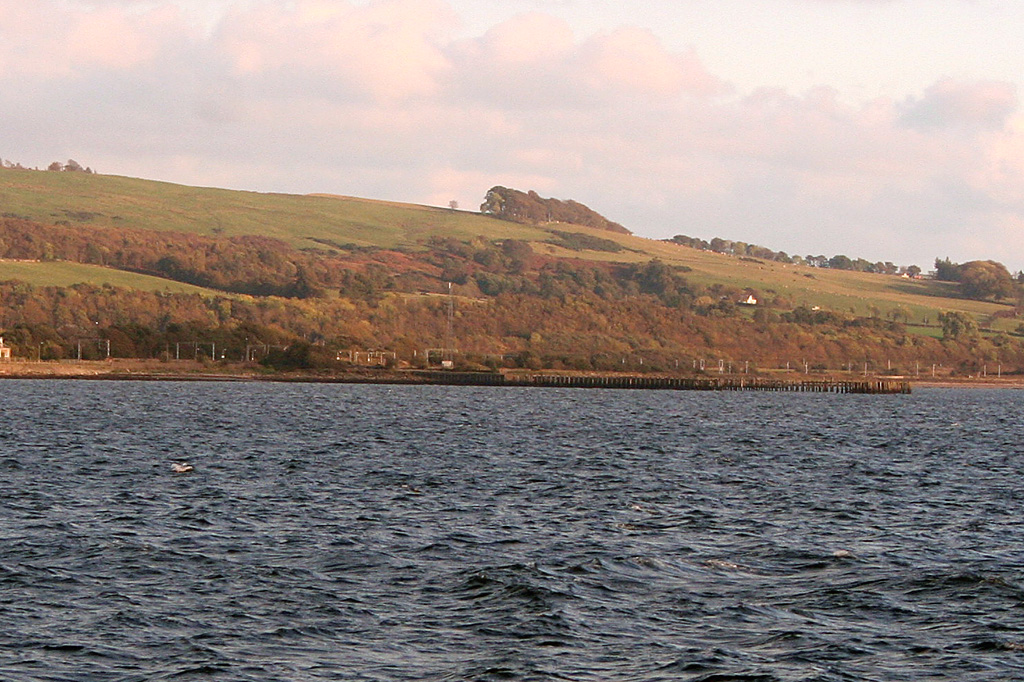
Craigendoran Pier in 2007 from the Clyde

Originally opened by the North British Railway on 15 May 1882, at one time the station had five platforms: two as an island platform on the West Highland Line - sometimes called Craigendoran Upper (opened in 1894 and closed in 1964, subsequently demolished), one on Craigendoran Pier serving Clyde Steamers (closed in 1972 and lifted) and two on the line to Helensburgh (one closed when the line was singled). All five platforms, bar those for the West Highland Line, were electrified. There were once goods sidings located in here, built in the 1940s, but these were removed in 1964 with the end of regular local freight workings.

The track layout at Craigendoran Junction was simplified in 1984 under the auspices of British Rail, singling the line to Helensburgh Central. The present layout at the junction, just east of the station, consists of a loop (available to West Highland Line trains only) and single lines to Helensburgh Upper and Helensburgh Central. The line south of here towards Dumbarton Central remains double track.

== Facilities ==
The station is equipped with a shelter (which is accessed by some steps), a bench and bike racks, as well as a car park, accessed over the footbridge. The only step-free access to the station is from Dennistoun Crescent. As there are no facilities to purchase tickets, passengers must buy one in advance, or from the guard on the train.

== Passenger volume ==
Passenger Volume at Craigendoran
	2002–03	2004–05	2005–06	2006–07	2007–08	2008–09	2009–10	2010–11	2011–12	2012–13	2013–14	2014–15	2015–16	2016–17	2017–18	2018–19	2019–20	2020–21	2021–22	2022–23
Entries and exits	131,146	148,508	162,922	158,599	180,486	200,914	194,718	198,606	195,522	193,958	208,894	170,944	152,756	136,294	137,522	119,170	127,380	70,988	122,892	141,704

The statistics cover twelve-month periods that start in April.

== Services ==
The typical off-peak service in trains per hour Mondays to Saturdays is:

- 2 tph to Edinburgh Waverley via Glasgow Queen Street (semi-fast)
- 2 tph to Helensburgh Central

On Sundays, the same service operates at the same frequency, but trains heading to Edinburgh Waverley serve all stations via Singer

Preceding station	National Rail	Following station
Cardross	ScotRail; North Clyde Line	Helensburgh Central
	Historical railways	
Junction with GD&HR	North British Railway; West Highland Railway	Helensburgh Upper
Cardross	North British Railway; Glasgow, Dumbarton and Helensburgh Railway	Helensburgh Central

== Bibliography ==
- Butt, R. V. J. (October 1995). The Directory of Railway Stations: details every public and private passenger station, halt, platform and stopping place, past and present (1st ed.). Sparkford: Patrick Stephens Ltd. ISBN 978-1-85260-508-7. OCLC 60251199. OL 11956311M.
- Jowett, Alan (March 1989). Jowett's Railway Atlas of Great Britain and Ireland: From Pre-Grouping to the Present Day (1st ed.). Sparkford: Patrick Stephens Ltd. ISBN 978-1-85260-086-0. OCLC 22311137.
- Quick, Michael (2022). Railway Passenger Stations in Great Britain: A Chronology (PDF) (5th ed.). London: Railway and Canal Historical Society.
- Yonge, John (May 1987). Jacobs, Gerald (ed.). British Rail Track Diagams - Book 1: ScotRail (1st ed.). Exeter: Quail Map Company. ISBN 0-9006-0948-6.
- Yonge, John (February 1993). Jacobs, Gerald (ed.). Railway Track Diagams - Book 1: Scotland and the Isle of Man (2nd ed.). Exeter: Quail Map Company. ISBN 0-9006-0995-8.
- Yonge, John (April 1996). Jacobs, Gerald (ed.). Railway Track Diagams - Book 1: Scotland and the Isle of Man (3rd ed.). Exeter: Quail Map Company. ISBN 1-8983-1919-7.
- Yonge, John (2007). Jacobs, Gerald (ed.). Railway Track Diagams - Book 1: Scotland & Isle of Man (Quail Track Plans) (fifth ed.). Bradford on Avon: Trackmaps. ISBN 978-0-9549866-3-6. OCLC 79435248.
