= Tyndrum Hills =

Range of hills in Argyll and Bute, Scotland

Coordinates: 56.396°N 4.767°W

The Tyndrum Hills are a mountain range located to the southwest of Tyndrum in the Scottish Highlands, within the Strath Fillan and Breadalbane area. They are also within Loch Lomond and the Trossachs National Park and are also known for the famous mountain Ben Lui.

The mountains include:

- Ben Lui, 1,130 metres (3,707 ft)
- Beinn a' Chleibh, 916 metres (3,005 ft)
- Ben Oss, 1,029 metres (3,376 ft)
- Beinn Dubhchraig, 978 metres (3,209 ft)
- Beinn Chuirn, 880 metres (2,887 ft)
