= Meall Odhar =

Mountain in the Scottish Highlands

Coordinates: 56°25′48″N 4°45′39″W

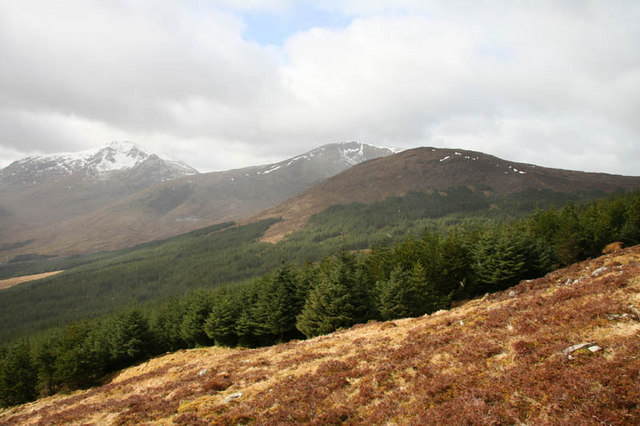
- Meall Odhar is the forested hill on the right.

Highest point
- Elevation: 656 m (2,152 ft)
- Prominence: 183 m (600 ft)
- Listing: Graham, Marilyn

Geography
- Location: Stirling, Scotland
- Parent range: Grampian Mountains
- OS grid: NN29797289
- Topo map: OS Landranger 50

Meall Odhar is a mountain in the Scottish Highlands, situated about 3 km to the west of Tyndrum, close to the northern boundary of the Loch Lomond and the Trossachs National Park. Meall Odhar is part of the Tyndrum Hills. With a height of 656 m and a drop of 183 m, it is listed as a Marilyn and a Graham. The name Meall Odhar is from the Gaelic for "dun-coloured round hill".
