= Beinn a' Chaisteil =

Mountain in the southern Highlands of Scotland

Coordinates: 56.491°N 4.6848°W

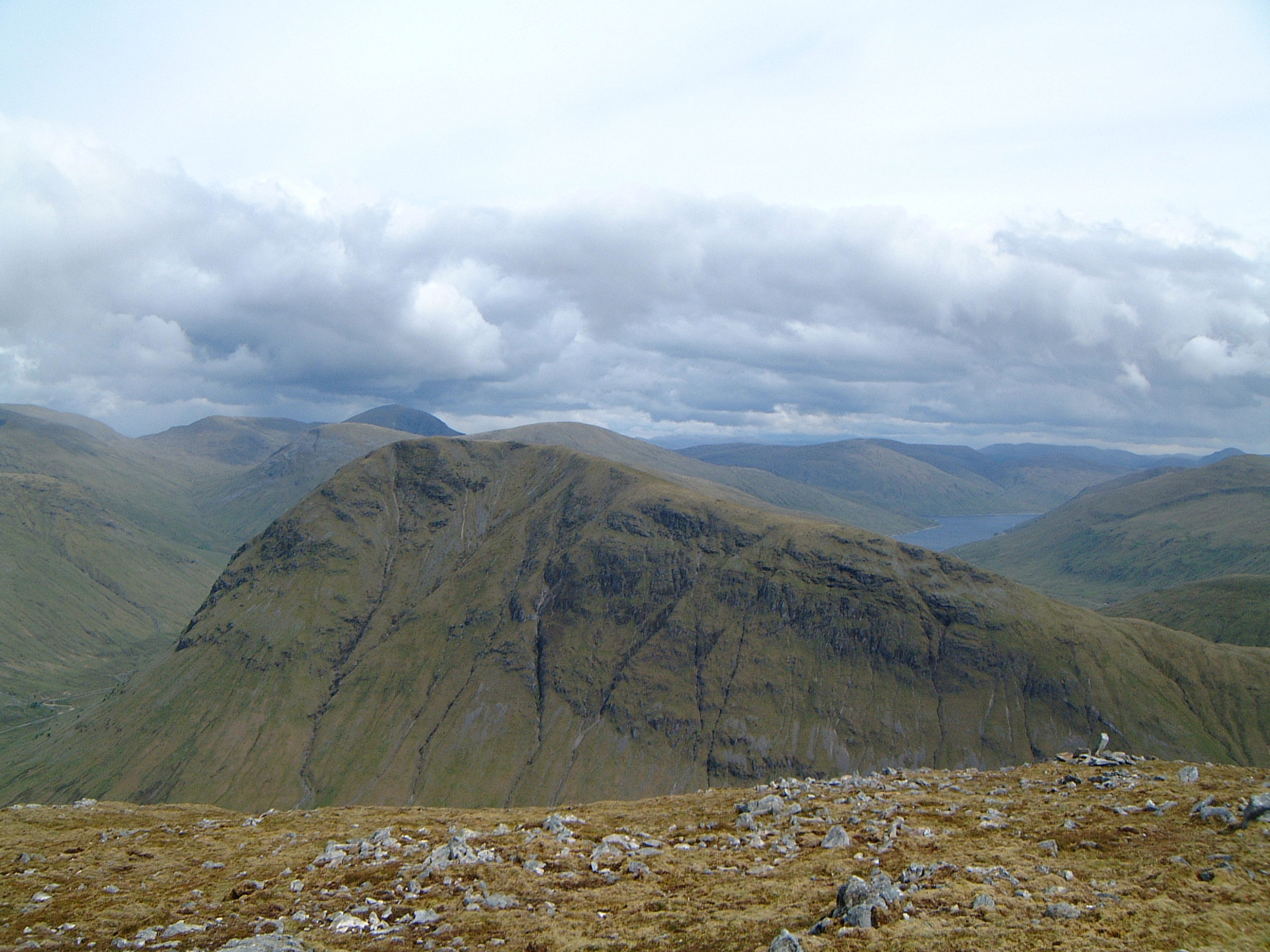
- The steep western face seen from Beinn Odhar 3 km to the SW.

Highest point
- Elevation: 886 m (2,907 ft)
- Prominence: 467 m (1,532 ft)
- Listing: Corbett, Marilyn

Naming
- English translation: Mountain of the Castle
- Language of name: Gaelic
- Pronunciation: Scottish Gaelic: [ˈpeiɲ ə ˈxaʃtʲal]

Geography
- Location within Scotland
- Location: Perth and Kinross/Argyll and Bute, Scotland
- Parent range: Grampians
- OS grid: NN347364
- Topo map: OS Landranger 50, OS Explorer 377

Beinn a' Chaisteil is a mountain in the southern Highlands of Scotland, it is located 6.25 km north of Tyndrum on the border of Perth and Kinross and Argyll and Bute council areas. This hill is not to be confused with another Beinn a' Chaisteil, above Loch Vaich in Highland Council area.

== Overview ==
Beinn a' Chaisteil reaches a height of 886 metres (2907 feet) making it the 39th highest Corbett and the 259th highest Marilyn in the UK. The mountain is well seen from the A82 road at Auch where its western flank is seen as huge wall standing sentinel at the entrance to the Auch Glen. The West Highland Railway travels across the base of the mountain on its western side as it loops dramatically over the Auch Glen and Glen Coralan on two viaducts. Beinn a' Chaisteil is usually climbed with the adjoining Beinn nam Fuaran to which it is joined by a col with a height of 546 metres. Strong walkers will include the mountain in the traverse of the "Auch Corbetts", an 18 km walk with almost 2000 metres of ascent which takes in the four other Corbetts of Beinn Odhar, Beinn Chaorach, Cam Chreag and Beinn nam Fuaran.

=== Etymology ===
The mountain's name translates from the Gaelic language as "Mountain of the Castle", a name which reflects the fortress like nature of its western flanks which fall steeply and rockily to the Auch Glen. The former spelling of Ben Achastle confirms that it is a name which goes well back into history. However the hills name may not just come from its physical appearance as W.J. Watson in his book "Circular Forts of North Perthshire" (1913) reveals that a circular fortification stood on one of the spurs of Beinn a' Chaisteil and the name may come from that. The fort has long since been obliterated by landslips but was the most westerly of over 20 forts which existed across northern Perthshire.

== Geography ==
Beinn a' Chaisteil is composed of two ridges which gives it a rough "L" shape, the SE ridge runs for two km to a col with a height of 419 metres which links to the adjacent Corbett of Cam Chreag. This ridge has steep crags on its western side and is scored by numerous gullies. The precipitous Coire Gaothach is situated just beneath the summit on this western side and is drained by the Allt Choire Gaothach which flows down to Glen Coralan to join the Allt Coralan. The NE ridge is broader than its counterpart and runs for 1.5 km to the Mam Lorn col (546 metres) which links to the Corbett of Beinn nam Fuaran.

The western crags of Beinn a' Chaisteil are used for Winter ice climbing with the main gully in the crag being first climbed in 1898. Another gully called Valkyrie has a Grade IV rating and there are other routes of similar difficulty. The mountain stands on the main east - west watershed of Scotland with drainage going to the west coast via the River Orchy and to the east via the River Lyon and the River Tay.

=== Literature ===
Beinn a' Chaisteil is mentioned in the work of Duncan Ban MacIntyre, the Scottish Gaelic poet who lived locally for part of his life. The mountain is mentioned in the "Song to The Gun Named Nic Coiseim"

I took thee to Ben Chaisteil,
and to the moor adjoining it,
the Mam and Creag an Aprain,
on the flank of Ben nam Fuaran.

== Ascents ==
The most popular starting point for the ascent of Beinn a' Chaisteil is Auch on the A82, however parking is extremely limited there and guide books recommend starting at a car park at NN328331 at the head of the glen and using the West Highland Way to walk down to Auch. A direct ascent of Beinn a' Chaisteil is possible from the foot of the Auch Glen but this is a very steep climb on grass with a few crags higher up which can be avoided. A less strenuous alternative is to walk up the Auch Glen for 2.5 km to the ancient burial ground and then climb SE to the col between Beinn a' Chaisteil and Beinn nam Fuaran from where both hills can be climbed. As noted Beinn a' Chaisteil can be ascended as part of the round of the five Auch Corbetts and is the last hill of the day to be climbed.
