= Tyndrum railway station =

Tyndrum railway station may refer to one of two stations in the town of Tyndrum, Scotland:

- Tyndrum Lower railway station, on the Oban line
- Upper Tyndrum railway station, on the Fort William line
