= Beinn Odhar =

Mountain in Scotland

Coordinates: 56.468°N 4.6984°W

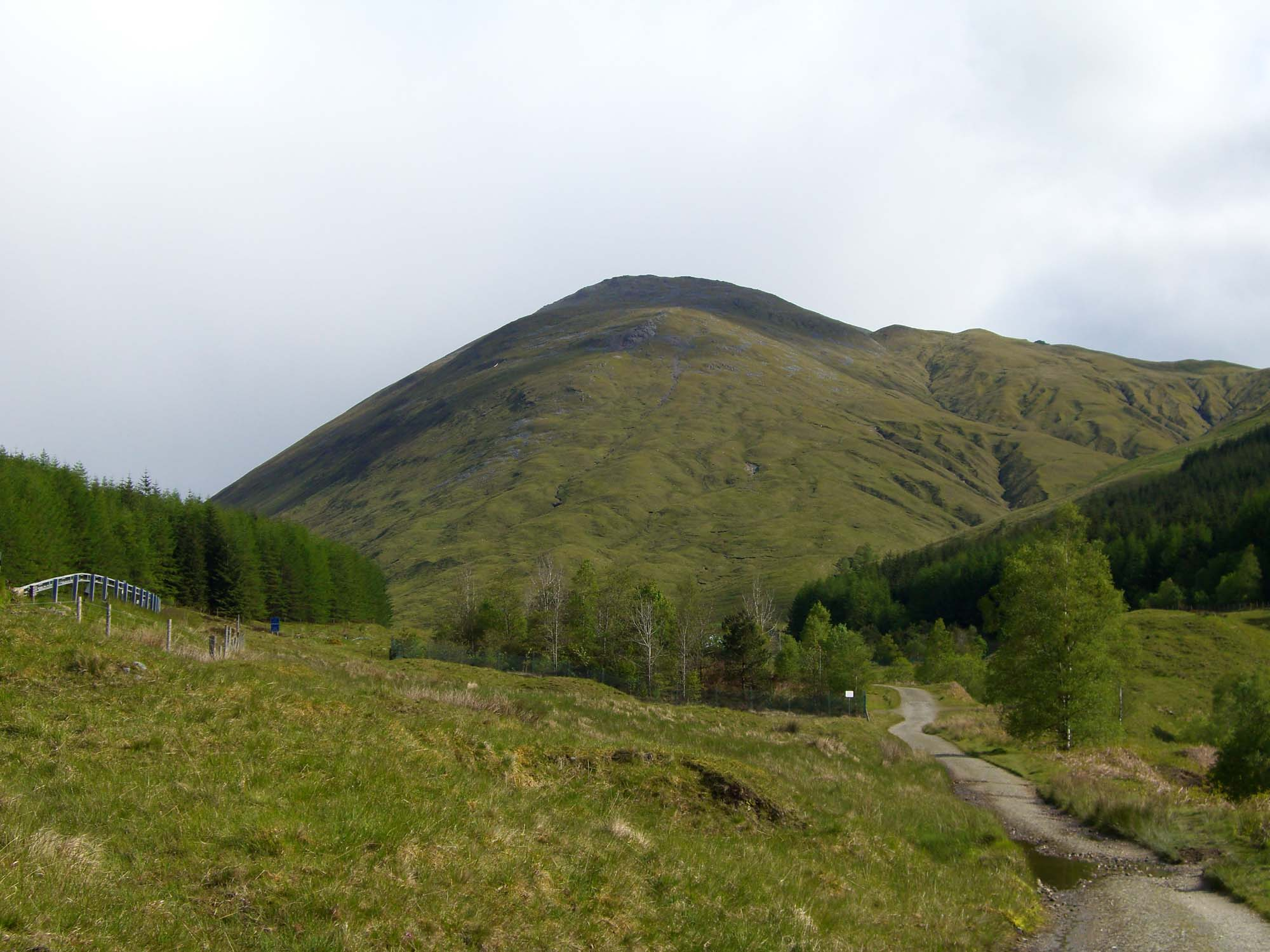
- Beinn Odhar seen from the West Highland Way as it leaves Tyndrum.

Highest point
- Elevation: 901 m (2,956 ft)
- Prominence: 457 m (1,499 ft)
- Listing: Corbett, Marilyn

Naming
- English translation: Dun Coloured Mountain
- Language of name: Gaelic
- Pronunciation: Scottish Gaelic: [peɲ ˈo.əɾ]

Geography
- Location: Argyll and Bute/Stirling, Scotland
- Parent range: Grampians
- OS grid: NN337339
- Topo map: OS Landranger 50, OS Explorer 377

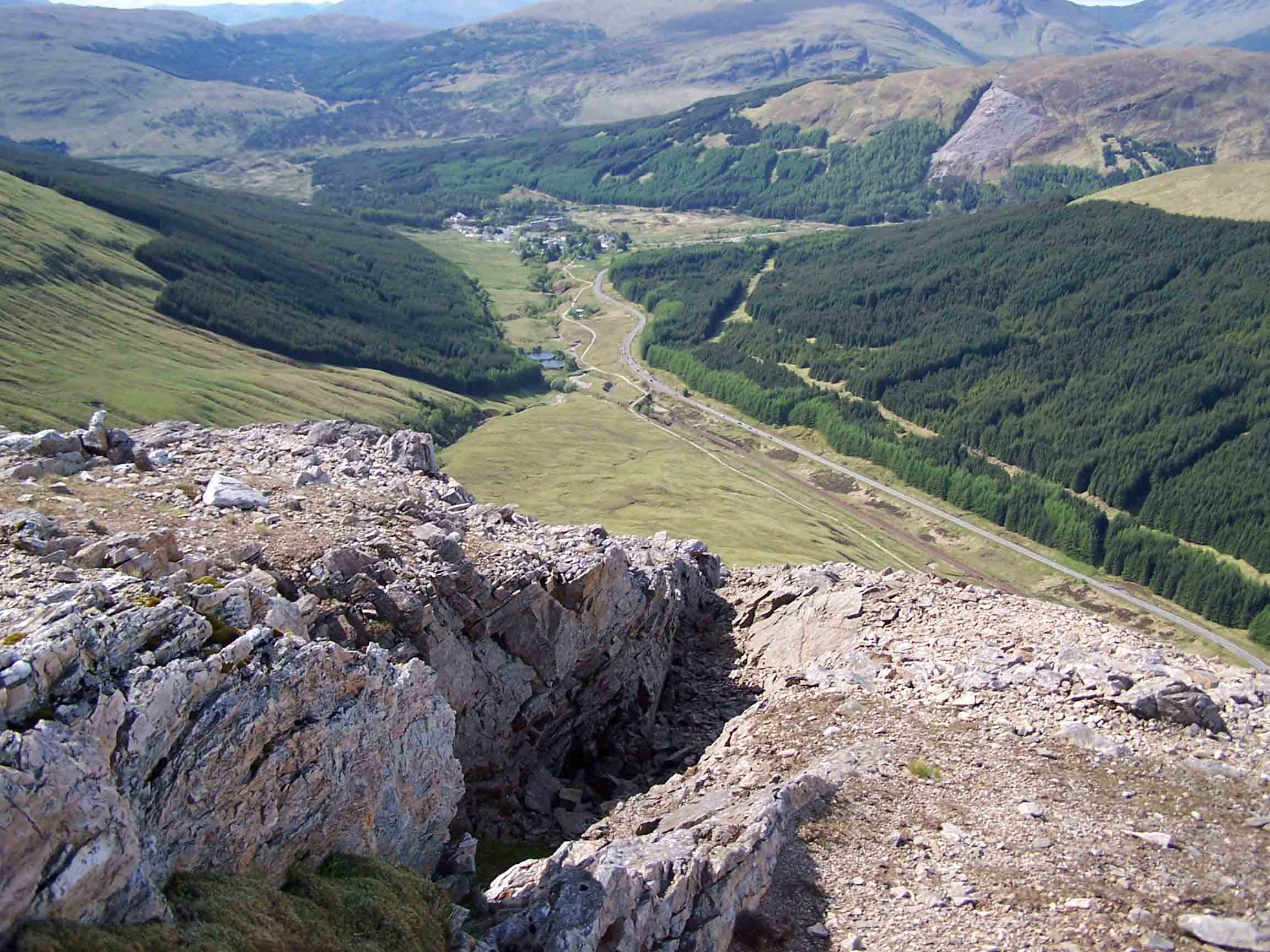
The old lead mine on the south slopes with Tyndrum in the valley.

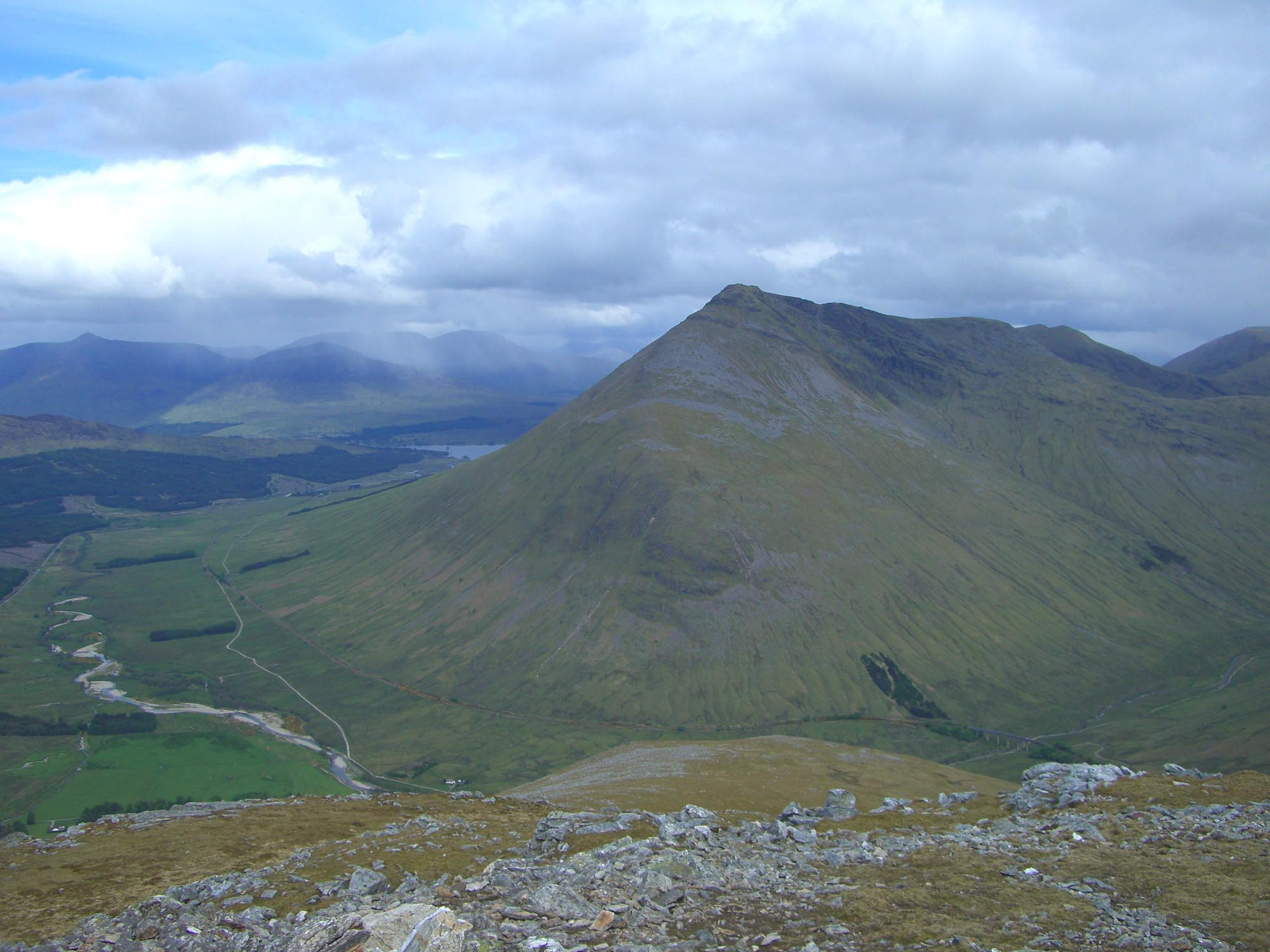
Looking north from the summit to Beinn Dorain.

Beinn Odhar is a Scottish mountain situated at the northern extremity of the Loch Lomond and the Trossachs National Park. It stands four km (2.5 mi) north of Tyndrum, a location with which it has strong ties, being well seen from the village. The mountain lies on the border between Argyll and Bute and Stirling council areas within the Auch and Invermeran estate.

== Overview ==
Beinn Odhar reaches a height of 901 metres (2956 feet) making it the 18th highest Corbett, failing to make Munro status by just 13 metres. The hill also qualifies as a Marilyn having a considerable prominence of 457 metres making it an excellent viewpoint. The grassy, steep, conical shape of Beinn Odhar is a well-known sight for vehicles travelling on the A82 road and for walkers on the West Highland Way, both of which pass on the immediate western side of the mountain. Beinn Odhar stands four km south of the Munro Beinn Dorain, both mountains being similar in shape and character and the possibility of confusing the two peaks by a cursory glance is not impossible.

Beinn Odhar is part of the “Auch Corbetts”, a group of five Corbetts which can be climbed in a single days walk from the hamlet of Auch (grid reference NN323355) on the A82. This is a rare situation as the Corbetts are usually difficult to combine in any number and the opportunity to climb five in a natural round is unique. The hills name translates from the Gaelic language as “Dun coloured mountain”, this alludes to the brownish-grey colour of the heather and grass on the hill. Irvine Butterfield points out that the name is a little insipid given the hill's steep slopes and distinctive shape.

== Geography ==
Beinn Odhar is characterised by steep slopes on all sides. The only prominent ridge of any length goes SE then south from the summit for 2.5 km to reach the subsidiary top of Meall Buidhe (653 metres) before continuing for a further three km to reach the valley floor of Strath Fillan, several km south of Tyndrum. The eastern flank of the mountain is riven by a deep gash caused by the Allt Choire Dhuibh, a stream which has it source in a small lochan on the SW side of the mountain called Lochan Choire Dhuibh which stands at a height of just under 800 metres. There is another lochan, unnamed, on the southern side of the hill at around the same height. The streams on the southern slopes form quite distinctive deep ravines (see picture) as they flow into Coire Thoin, together they form the headwaters of the River Fillan.

The hills other major corrie stands on the northern slopes, this is Coire Luaidh (Corrie of Lead) which contains the hills only crags on its higher slopes. The corries name refers to lead mining which took place in the 18th and 19th centuries. Beinn Odhar stands on the Tyndrum fault, whose veins yielded large amounts of lead on Beinn Chùirn to the SW, however the mines on Odhar were not as productive. The best example of former mining activity on the hill can be seen on the southern slopes, at a height of 650 metres there is considerable evidence of an adit going into the hillside and much mining waste. Beinn Odhar stands on the drainage divide of Scotland with rainfall from the mountain going to both coasts, either going west via Glen Orchy to reach the sea at Oban or east by the River Tay to reach the sea at Dundee.

== Ascents and view ==
Beinn Odhar is usually climbed from the south and there are three popular starting points. The start from the village of Tyndrum goes north via a track which was formerly the main road until the 1930s but now carries the West Highland Way. After two km the track is left and the hill is ascended by the southern slopes passing the old mine and a small lochan on the way. Guide books mention a track as far as the mine on this route but this is not easy to locate. Another starting point is Dalrigh on the A82 (grid reference NN344291), this route climbs by the long south ridge passing over Meall Buidhe and is a longer and less steep alternative.

Walkers who wish to tackle all five of the Auch Corbetts, a tough day with over 2000 metres of ascent, are advised by guide books to start at a parking place on the A82 at grid reference NN328331 as parking at Auch is limited. From here it is possible to climb Beinn Odhar by the south ridge. The top of the mountain is marked by a cairn and gives fine views to the Black Mount to the north and the hills around Crianlarich to the south.
