= Bridge of Orchy railway station =

Railway station in Argyll and Bute, Scotland

Bridge of Orchy Scottish Gaelic: Drochaid Urchaidh
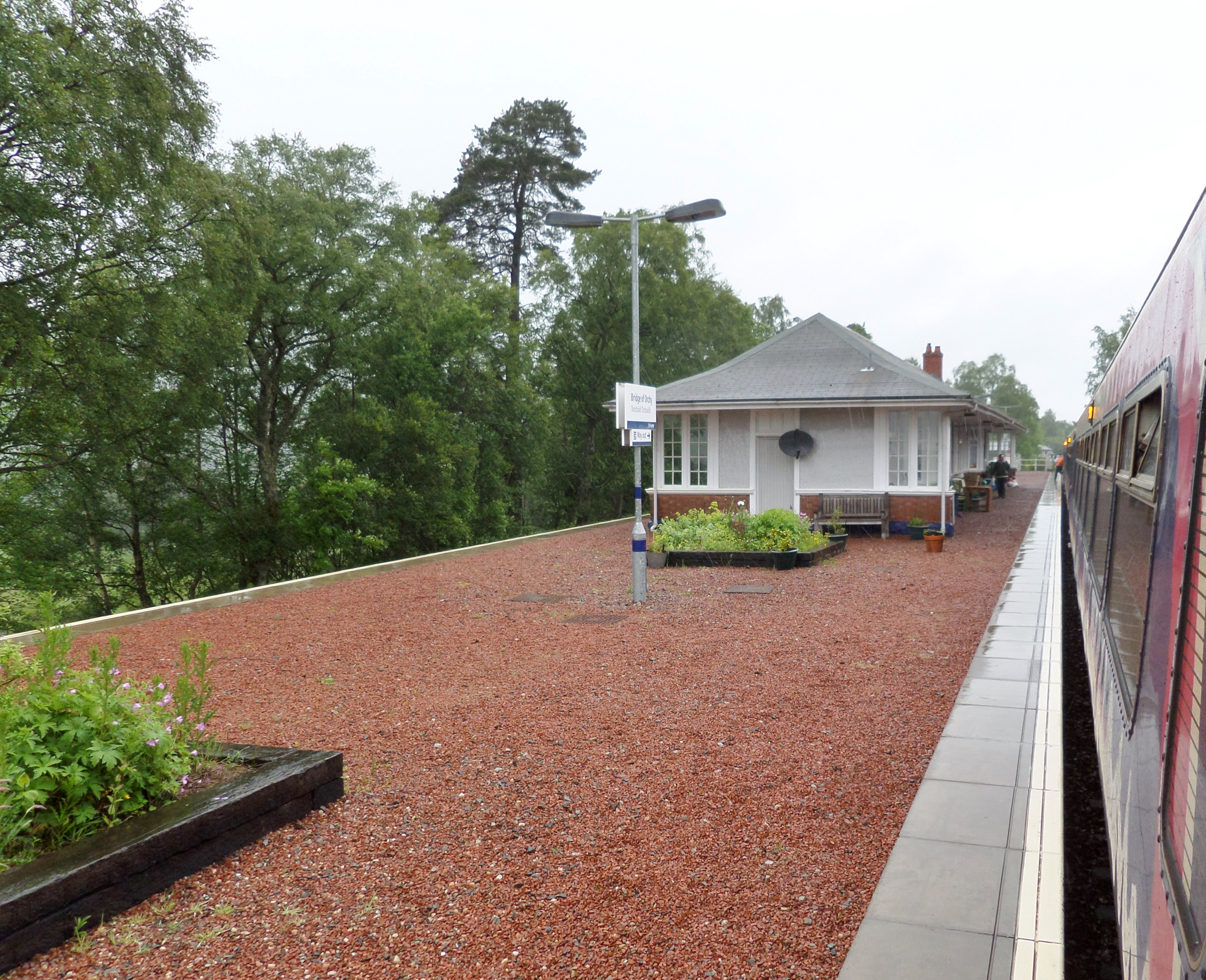

General information
- Location: Bridge of Orchy, Argyll and Bute; Scotland
- Coordinates: 56.5162°N 4.7642°W
- Grid reference: NN300394
- Manager: ScotRail
- Platforms: 2

Other information
- Station code: BRO

History
- Original company: West Highland Railway
- Pre-grouping: North British Railway
- Post-grouping: LNER

Key dates
- 7 August 1894: Opened

Passengers
- 2021/22: ▲4,126
- 2022/23: ▲5,390
- 2023/24: ▲7,286
- 2024/25: ▲7,958
- 2025/26: ▲9,004

Listed Building – Category B
- Designated: 15 November 1979
- Reference no.: LB13072
Location
Notes
- Passenger statistics from the Office of Rail and Road

Bridge of Orchy railway station is a railway station in the village of Bridge of Orchy in the west of Scotland. The station is on the West Highland Line, between Rannoch and Upper Tyndrum, 48 miles 68 chains (78.6 km) from Craigendoran Junction, near Helensburgh. ScotRail manage the station and operate most services, with others provided by Caledonian Sleeper.

== History ==
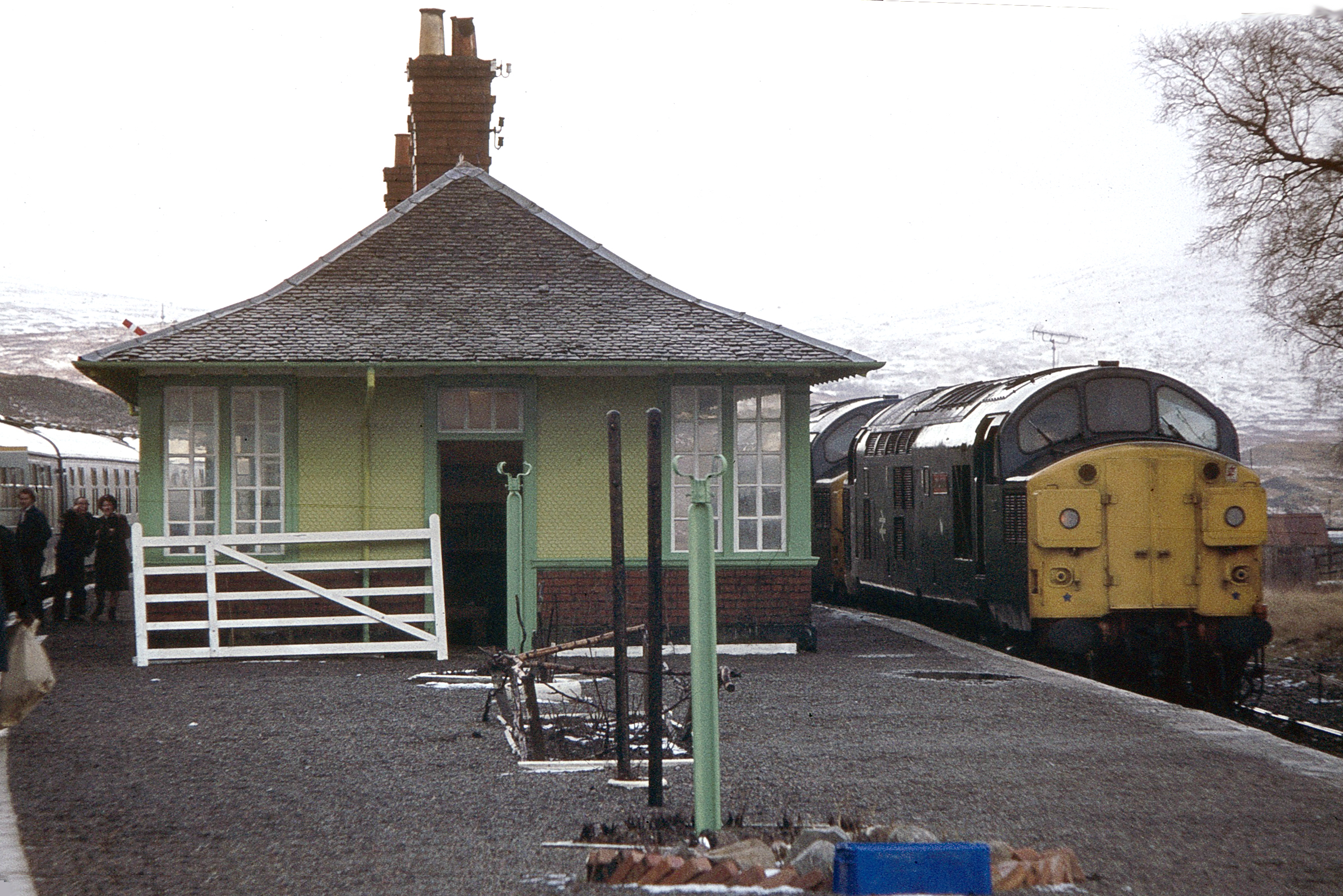
Bridge of Orchy station in the 1980s

This station opened by the West Highland Railway on 7 August 1894.

The station was host to a LNER camping coach from 1935 to 1939 and possibly one for some of 1934.

== Facilities ==
The island platform is only equipped with shelters and bike racks, although there is a car park. The only access to the station is via a stepped subway, so there is no step-free access. As there are no facilities to purchase tickets, passengers must buy one in advance, or from the guard on the train.

== Passenger volume ==
Passenger Volume at Bridge of Orchy
	2004–05	2005–06	2006–07	2007–08	2008–09	2009–10	2010–11	2011–12	2012–13	2013–14	2014–15	2015–16	2016–17	2017–18	2018–19	2019–20	2020–21	2021–22	2022–23	2023–24	2024–25
Entries and exits	4,941	5,112	5,108	5,966	5,690	5,416	6,192	5,890	5,726	5,932	6,024	5,880	5,680	6,032	6,490	5,906	986	4,126	5,390	7,286	7,958

The statistics cover twelve month periods that start in April.

== Services ==
Monday to Saturday, Bridge of Orchy has three ScotRail services to Mallaig and three services to Glasgow Queen Street. Caledonian Sleeper operate one service each day, each way to Fort William and London Euston (except Saturday nights). On Sundays, there are two services northbound to Mallaig and two southbound to Glasgow Queen Street, as well as the Caledonian Sleeper to London Euston. This can also be used by regular travellers to and from stations towards Edinburgh, as it is booked to set down at some stations and carries seating coaches as far as Edinburgh.

Preceding station	National Rail	Following station
Rannoch	ScotRail; West Highland Line	Upper Tyndrum
Rannoch	Caledonian Sleeper; Highland Caledonian Sleeper	Upper Tyndrum
	Historical railways	
Tyndrum	North British Railway; West Highland Railway	Gorton

== Bibliography ==
- Brailsford, Martyn, ed. (December 2017) [1987]. Railway Track Diagrams 1: Scotland & Isle of Man (6th ed.). Frome: Trackmaps. ISBN 978-0-9549866-9-8.
- Butt, R. V. J. (October 1995). The Directory of Railway Stations: details every public and private passenger station, halt, platform and stopping place, past and present (1st ed.). Sparkford: Patrick Stephens Ltd. ISBN 978-1-85260-508-7. OCLC 60251199. OL 11956311M.
- Jowett, Alan (March 1989). Jowett's Railway Atlas of Great Britain and Ireland: From Pre-Grouping to the Present Day (1st ed.). Sparkford: Patrick Stephens Ltd. ISBN 978-1-85260-086-0. OCLC 22311137.
- McRae, Andrew (1997). British Railway Camping Coach Holidays: The 1930s & British Railways (London Midland Region). Vol. Scenes from the Past: 30 (Part One). Foxline. ISBN 1-870119-48-7.
- Quick, Michael (2022). Railway Passenger Stations in Great Britain: A Chronology (PDF) (5th ed.). London: Railway and Canal Historical Society. Archived from the original (PDF) on 15 March 2023.
