= Rannoch railway station =

Railway station in Perth and Kinross, Scotland

Rannoch Scottish Gaelic: Raineach
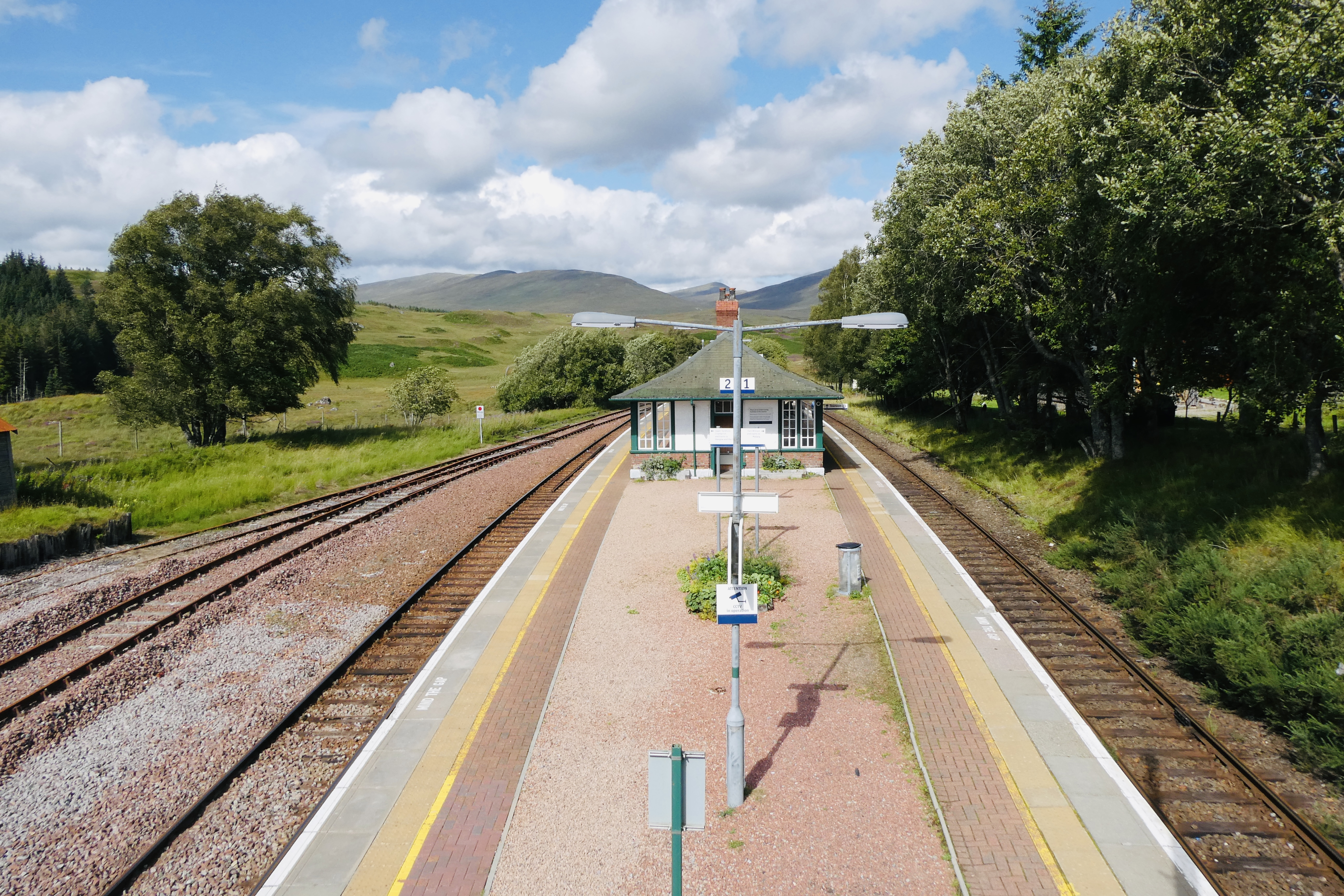
- Rannoch station, looking north from the footbridge

General information
- Location: Rannoch, Perth and Kinross; Scotland
- Coordinates: 56.6859°N 4.5770°W
- Grid reference: NN422578
- Manager: ScotRail
- Platforms: 2

Other information
- Station code: RAN

History
- Opened: 7 August 1894

Passengers
- 2021/22: ▲6,246
- 2022/23: ▼5,818
- 2023/24: ▲7,304
- 2024/25: ▲7,802
- 2025/26: ▲8,554

Listed Building – Category B
- Designated: 21 December 1988
- Reference no.: LB12245
Location
Notes
- Passenger statistics from the Office of Rail and Road

Rannoch railway station, on the West Highland Line, serves the area of Rannoch in Perth and Kinross, Scotland. It is situated between Corrour and Bridge of Orchy, 64 miles 36 chains (103.7 km) from Craigendoran Junction, near Helensburgh. ScotRail manage the station and operate most services, along with Caledonian Sleeper.

== History ==
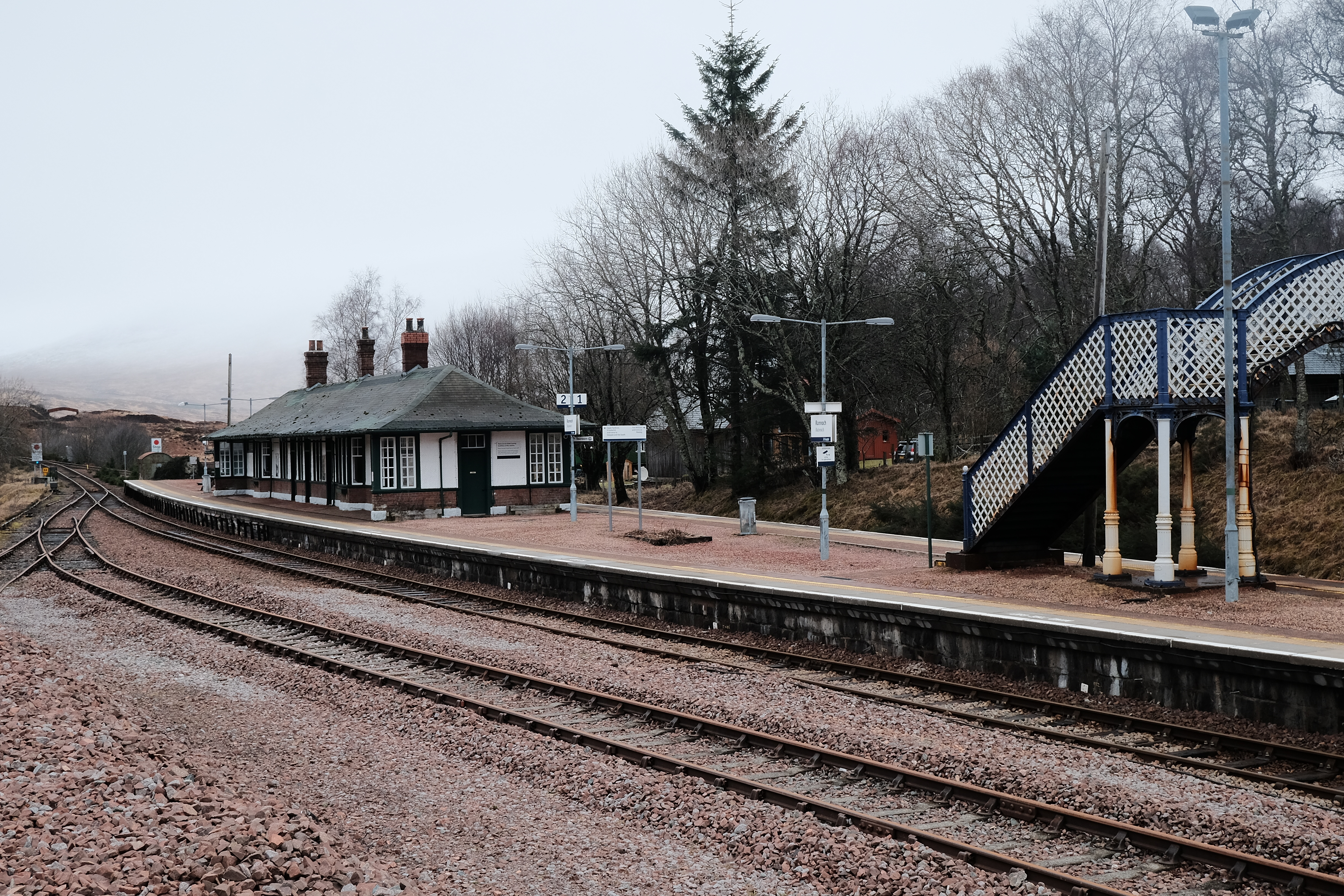
The station in 2023

When the West Highland Line was built across Rannoch Moor, its builders had to float the tracks on a mattress of tree roots, brushwood and thousands of tons of earth and ashes to prevent the heavy steel tracks sinking in the bog.

Rannoch station opened to passengers on 7 August 1894.

The station was laid out with a crossing loop and an island platform. There were sidings on both sides, and a turntable on the east side of the line. The siding on the east side has been removed. The station was host to a LNER camping coach from 1937 to 1939.

At the north end of the platform is a sculptured head, carved in stone by the navvies (workmen) who built the line. It commemorates James Renton, a director of the West Highland Railway, who gave part of his personal fortune to save the line from bankruptcy during construction when the brushwood raft was continually sinking into Rannoch Moor.

In 2017, Simon Jenkins reported it to be one of the best 10 stations in Britain.

There was formerly another crossing point on Rannoch Moor, at Gorton near where the railway crossed the Rannoch Drove Road, and operationally dividing the long section between Bridge of Orchy and Rannoch stations. It remains today as an engineer's siding.

== Location ==
Although the railway links the station with Glasgow and Fort William on the West Highland Line, the station area is otherwise more closely linked, by road, with central Highland towns and villages on or near the A9 road. Its remote location on Rannoch Moor is picturesque and makes it attractive to walkers.

== Facilities ==
The station is well equipped despite its rural location, with a café and visitor centre, toilets, a phone and a car park and bike racks. However, the only access is via a stepped footbridge, so the station does not have step-free access. As there are no facilities to purchase tickets, passengers must buy one in advance, or from the guard on the train.

== Passenger volume ==
Passenger Volume at Rannoch
| | 2004–05 | 2005–06 | 2006–07 | 2007–08 | 2008–09 | 2009–10 | 2010–11 | 2011–12 | 2012–13 | 2013–14 | 2014–15 | 2015–16 | 2016–17 | 2017–18 | 2018–19 | 2019–20 | 2020–21 | 2021–22 | 2022–23 | 2023–24 | 2024–25 |
|---|---|---|---|---|---|---|---|---|---|---|---|---|---|---|---|---|---|---|---|---|---|
| Entries and exits | 11,251 | 11,453 | 11,214 | 17,093 | 15,028 | 10,312 | 10,344 | 9,130 | 8,266 | 9,486 | 9,434 | 8,378 | 7,780 | 7,980 | 8,834 | 7,290 | 966 | 6,246 | 5,818 | 7,304 | 7,802 |

The statistics cover twelve month periods that start in April.

== Services ==
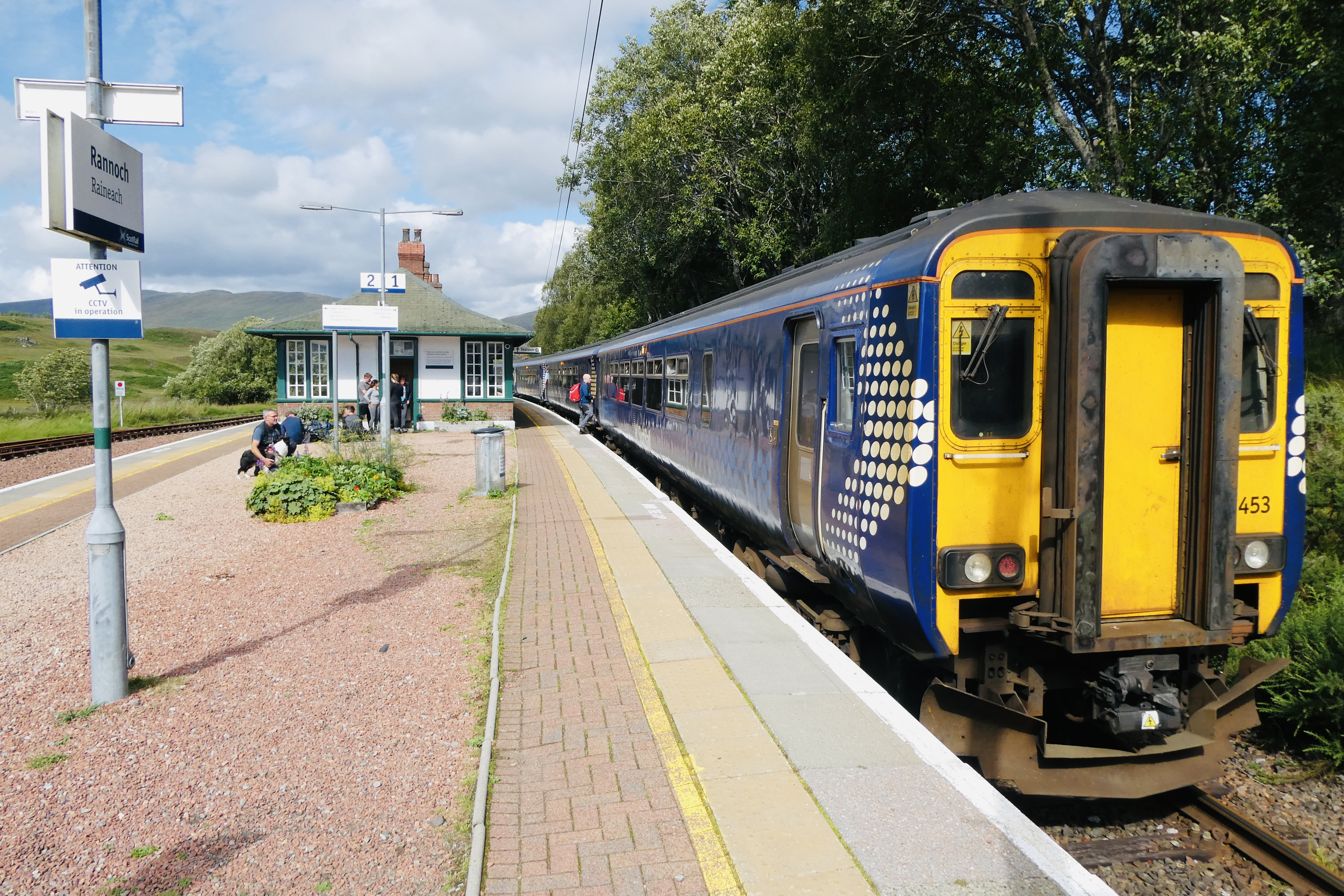
156493 and 156453 standing at Rannoch with a ScotRail service bound for Mallaig

Monday to Saturday, ScotRail operates three services north to Mallaig and three services south to Glasgow Queen Street. On Sundays, this decreases to just two each way. Caledonian Sleeper run six services per week (not Saturday nights) each way to Fort William, and London Euston via Edinburgh. The sleeper also carries seated coaches and can therefore be used by regular passengers to/from stations towards Edinburgh, as it is booked to pick up/set down at some stations.

| Preceding station | National Rail | Following station |
|---|---|---|
| Bridge of Orchy | ScotRail; West Highland Line | Corrour |
| Bridge of Orchy | Caledonian Sleeper; Highland Caledonian Sleeper | Corrour |
| | Historical railways | |
| Gorton | North British Railway; West Highland Railway | Corrour |

== See also ==
- Rannoch Barracks
- Loch Rannoch
- Rannoch School
- Kinloch Rannoch
- Dunalastair
- Tummel hydro-electric power scheme
- The Soldiers' Trenches, Moor of Rannoch

== Bibliography ==
- McRae, Andrew (1997). British Railway Camping Coach Holidays: The 1930s & British Railways (London Midland Region). Vol. Scenes from the Past: 30 (Part One). Foxline. ISBN 1-870119-48-7.
