= Beinn Chùirn =

Scottish hill on the border of Stirlingshire and Perthshire

Coordinates: 56.4236°N 4.7883°W

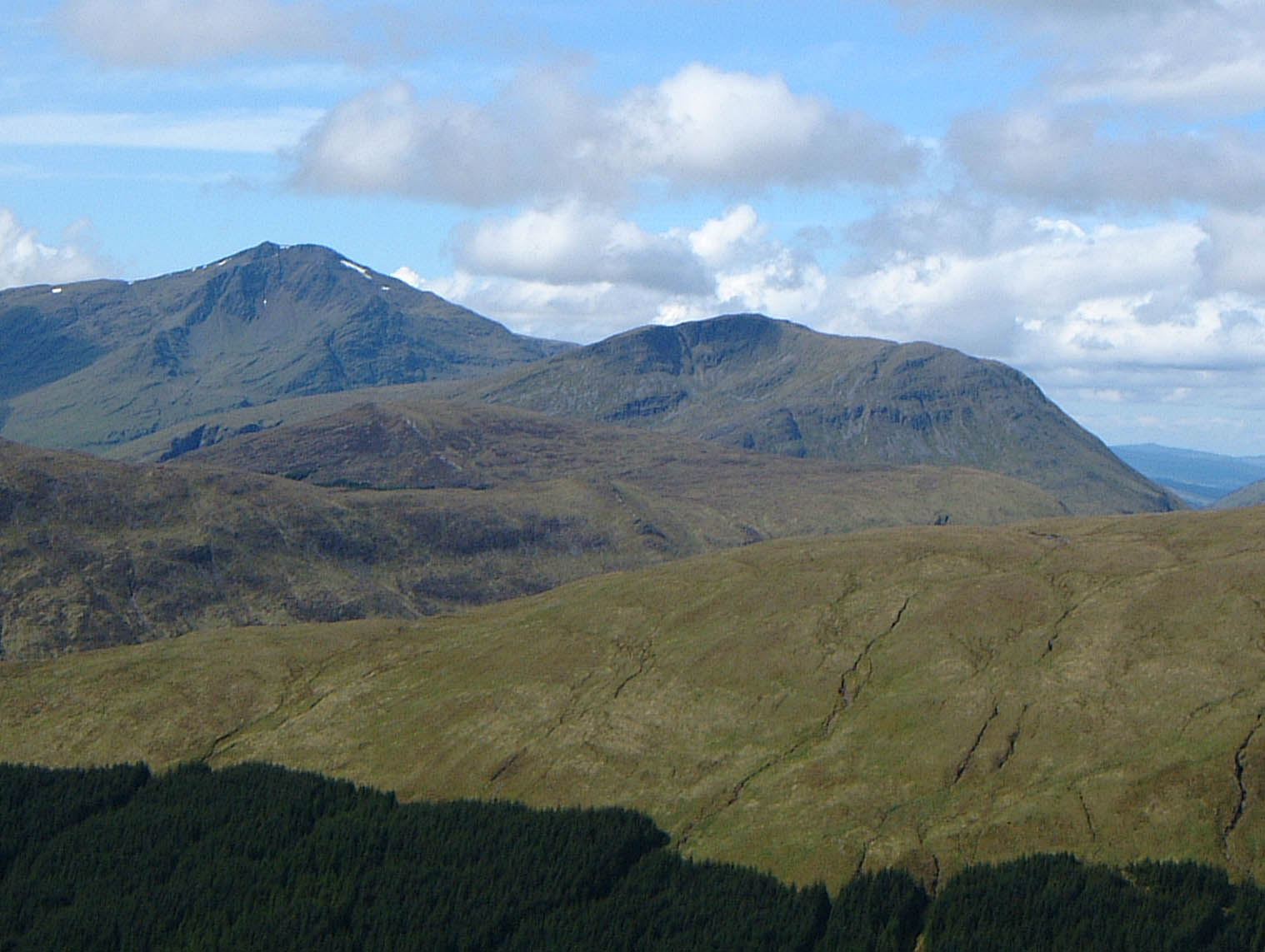
- Beinn Chùirn (centre) with the higher Ben Lui (left) seen from the high ground to the NE

Highest point
- Elevation: 880 m (2,890 ft)
- Prominence: 446 m (1,463 ft)
- Parent peak: Ben Lui
- Listing: Corbett, Marilyn

Naming
- English translation: Cairn Hill
- Language of name: Gaelic
- Pronunciation: Scottish Gaelic: [peɲ ˈxuːɾʲɲ]

Geography
- Location within Scotland
- Location: Stirlingshire, Scotland
- Parent range: Grampians
- OS grid: NN280292
- Topo map: OS Landranger 50 OS Explorer 377

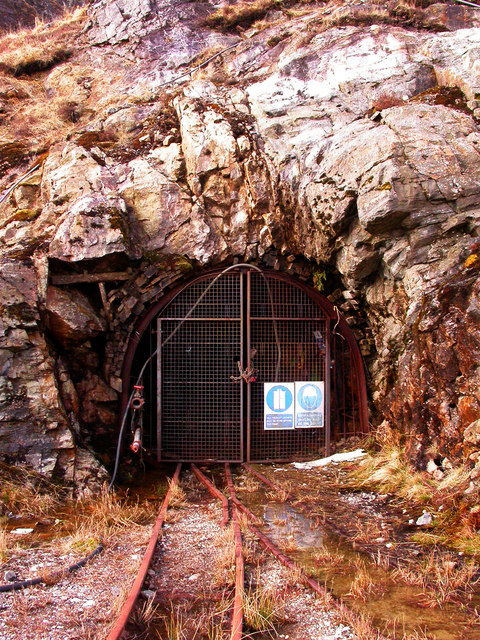
The entrance to the Eas Anie gold mine

Beinn Chùirn is a hill five kilometres (three miles) west-southwest of Tyndrum, Scotland, standing on the border of Stirlingshire and Perthshire at the northern extremity of the Loch Lomond and The Trossachs National Park.

== Overview ==
Beinn Chùirn reaches a height of 880 metres (2,890 feet) and qualifies as a Corbett and a Marilyn. It stands in the Cononish valley in the company of three other mountains (Ben Lui, Ben Oss and Beinn Dubhchraig which are all Munros and tend to overshadow the smaller hill. When seen from the east, Beinn Chùirn looks like a smaller version of the neighbouring Ben Lui, both having impressive east-facing corries; it is sometimes mistaken for Ben Lui by motorists on the A82 road in Strath Fillan. The hill's name translates from the Gaelic language as "cairn hill", This is thought to have originated because the hill was an important point on the ancient boundary between the kingdoms of the Picts and Dál Riata. In recent years the hill has received some publicity after the discovery of a vein of gold on its slopes.

== Geography ==
Beinn Chùirn has quite a high topographic prominence of 446 metres being surrounded by glens and low cols. To the north is Glen Lochy and to the south is the Cononish valley. Two kilometres to the east lies another Marilyn hill, Meall Odhar, from which it is separated by a col of 473 metres, while three kilometres to the south-west lies the Munro Ben Lui across a col of 434 metres. The hill has a fine east-facing corrie, Coire na Saobhaidhe, which is small but has steep walls. Just north of the summit at a height of 810 metres is an unnamed circular lochan about 100 metres in diameter.

A ridge that goes south-east from the summit contains a gorge down which the Allt Eas Anie flows in a series of waterfalls, one of which is quite large and impressive. This gorge gives a challenging ice climb when frozen in winter. The northern slopes which fall to Glen Lochy are clothed in coniferous woodland below the 350-metre contour. Drainage from this northern slope finds its way to the west coast of Scotland at Dalmally via the rivers Lochy and Orchy. Drainage from all other parts of the mountain goes to the east coast as it forms part of the headwaters of the River Tay.

== Ascents ==
Beinn Chùirn has two popular routes of ascent and used together they can be utilised for a complete traverse of the hill if transport can be organised. One route starts in the Cononish glen and uses the south-east ridge as a means of ascent, passing the old mine workings and waterfalls around the Eas Anie gorge on the way to the summit. The other route starts in Glen Lochy at grid reference NN263305, there is no footbridge over the River Lochy but a railway bridge can be used to cross the river if it is in spate. The route then goes through the forest following the water course into the Garbh Choirean and climbing onto the summit ridge. Another route starts from Tyndrum and goes over Meall Odhar via the Sròn nan Colan lead mines before continuing to Beinn Chùirn by the SE ridge. The summit is a large flat area with an old fence crossing it just north of the cairn.

== Lead mining ==
The Eas Anie site was a major lead mining area from 1739 until 1923. The amount of lead mined led to a lead smelter being built in the mid-18th century in Strath Fillan just outside Tyndrum. The lead ore was brought off the hill and down directly to the smelter by a "gravity" track. At the time of the 1745 Jacobite rising, the English Jacobite Sir Robert Clifton owned the lease for the mine; the Argyle Militia suspected that Clifton was making the lead into bullets and sabotaged the workings and burned the miners' houses. In the ensuing years several firms tried to make a going concern of the mine including the Company of Mine Adventurers of England and the Scots Mining Company but turnover was greatly reduced by the end of the 19th century, and the last lead was extracted in 1923.

== Gold mine ==
In 1984 a gold-bearing quartz vein was discovered by the Irish firm Ennex International on the lower south-eastern slopes of Beinn Chùirn just above Cononish Farm at Eas Anie. The company spent over £250,000 doing test drillings and were hopeful that the mine would be very productive. The gold, which is the most important deposit found in Scotland so far, occurs as minute particles inside pyrite and galena which in turn occur in the quartz vein. Despite claims that there are up to a million tonnes of ore present on the site which could produce five tonnes of gold and about 25 tonnes of silver, the location was only developed briefly in the 1990s when an adit (tunnel) of approximately 1,280 metres was driven into the hillside.

In 1994, the Caledonian Mining Company acquired the mineral exploration concession with the intention of putting it into production; however, the falling price of gold meant that such a small deposit was uneconomic at the time. Higher gold prices in 2007 have led to renewed activity with Scotgold Resources of Perth, Western Australia, purchasing the mineral exploration concession and applying to extend the lease and start gold production within two years, for a period of eight years. Projected output figures are based only on geochemical assay from borehole cores and samples from the tunnel. However, permission to commence commercial gold production has now been granted by the Crown Estate, which owns the rights to all gold in the UK excluding Sutherland, and by the Loch Lomond and the Trossachs National Park. An estimated £170 million worth (of which £65 million is tax-exempt) of precious metals are in the site. The mining would commence over a ten-year period and at least fifty jobs would be created. The company Scotgold are considering the local area as well, because some of the money will go to the local community to help develop a visitor and heritage centre. They are also taking into account that the initial mine structure, set up in the 1980s and '90s, is within a national park, meaning they are considering the possible complications that this may bring. See "The Environmental Impacts of the Cononish Mine" section for further details.

Scotgold Resources went into administration in November 2023. After acquisition by the South African firm Acrux Gold, production resumed in 2026.

=== Environmental impacts of the Cononish mine ===
Initially, the local community down in the village of Tyndrum, a popular tourist and walking centre bisected by the West Highland Way, locals talked positively of the project in the hills above them. The area has long attracted amateur gold panners, and John Riley, of Strathfillan community council says that the community is excited about the development. He also says that "The mine will provide obvious advantages in employment, training and education for young people and others in the community, which will have all sorts of knock-on effects on ancillary trades and hotels and guest houses." "People will want to come and see the mine. It will have a very beneficial effect. Obviously there are environmental issues but we think they have been adequately addressed."
