= Gorton railway station (Scotland) =

Closed railway station in Argyll and Bute, Scotland

Gorton Gortan
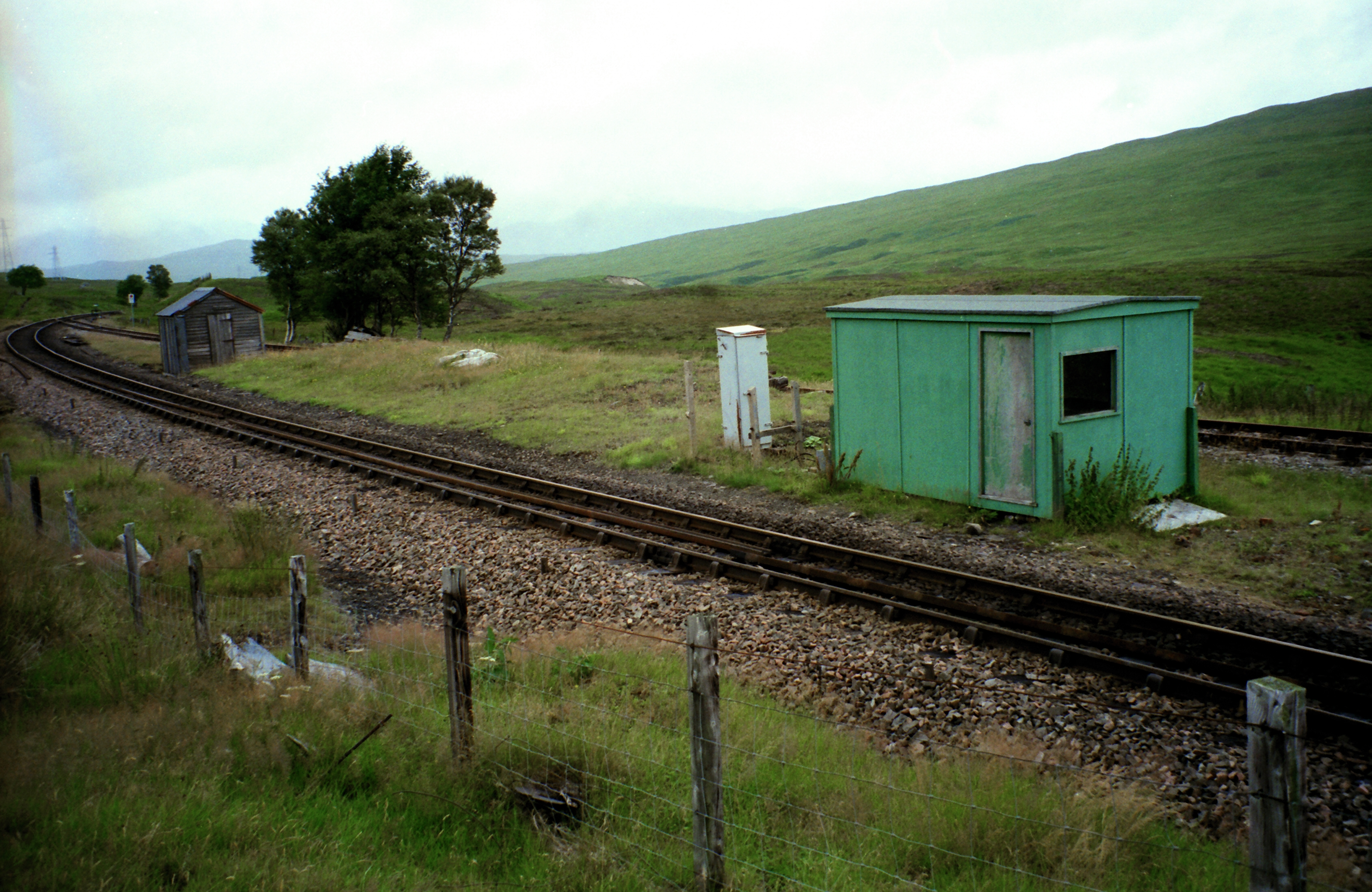
- Gorton station looking SW from near the platemen's bothy, 26 Aug 1996

General information
- Location: On Rannoch Moor between Bridge of Orchy and Rannoch station, Argyll & Bute; Scotland
- Coordinates: 56.595639°N 4.617383°W
- Grid reference: NN39394792
- Platforms: 2

Other information
- Status: Disused

History
- Original company: West Highland Railway
- Pre-grouping: North British Railway
- Post-grouping: London and North Eastern Railway

Key dates
- 7 August 1894: Opened
- 1 May 1926: Renamed
- 1964: Closed
Location

Gorton railway station or Gortan railway station, named for the nearby Meall a Ghortain area of high ground, was a remote rural private railway station on Rannoch Moor, Argyll and Bute, Scotland. Opened in 1894 by the North British Railway, it was located at the present day Gorton Crossing engineer's siding where the ancient Rannoch Drove Road crossed the railway line.

Alternative names recorded are Gorton Crossing Station; Gorton Farm; Gorton Platform; Gortan Railway Siding. To prevent confusion with the 'Gorton' in Manchester the LNER applied the name 'Gortan', suggesting that it appeared in timetables. It had originally been changed in 1928 from 'Gortan' to 'Gorton'. It was the least publicised station on the line and one reference states that it was discovered from time to time by journalists "short of copy".

== History ==
Although the area seems remote, the presence here of the ancient Rannoch drovers' road meant that travellers would have passed this way in reasonable numbers and a drove stance was even located at Gorton, used by shepherds for sheep and cattle well into the early 20th century.

The West Highland Railway opened the line to passengers on 7 August 1894; later it was operated by the North British Railway, until in 1923 it became part of the London and North Eastern Railway. In 1948 the line became part of the Scottish Region of British Railways following nationalisation.

The station was named after the nearby Ghortain or Gorton shepherd's cottage, now a bothy maintained by the Mountain Bothies Association. This building is where in 1889 James Bulloch, Charles Forman, J. E. Harrison, Major Martin, John Bett and N. B. McKenzie were taken after getting into severe difficulties whilst walking the route of the proposed West Highland Railway.

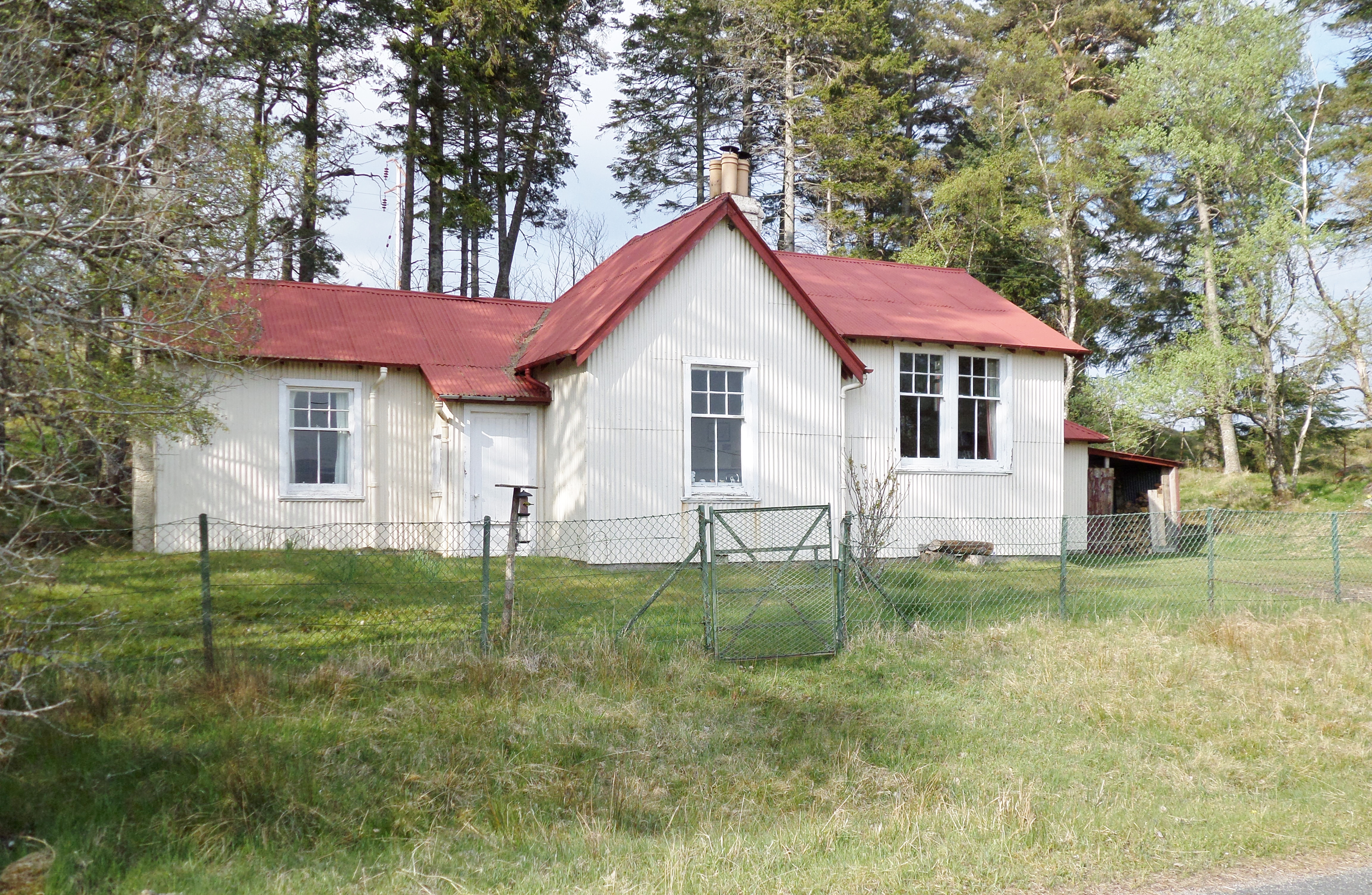
Rannoch Station School was once used by the children from Gorton and Strathtulla.

Gorton was a useful crossing point on the long single-track section between Bridge of Orchy and Rannoch, and originally had the typical island platform, a signal box and housing for the signalman and his family. A condition imposed by the landowner, Lord Breadalbane, when the West Highland Railway sought permission to construct the line across Rannoch Moor was that the station would be private with no public access and indeed railway regulations laid down that any railway employee permitting the public to use the station would be dismissed from service. The signal box and various associated buildings were demolished following closure in circa 1964. The signal box had been a standard design similar to the one at Corrour.

Gorton stands at 1100 ft (335 m) above sea level, lying around 9 miles (14 km) northeast of Achallader Farm from which there is a rough track as far as Gorton bothy; the last mile or so (2 km) being trackless. It is approximately the same distance from Rannoch; in this direction the last 1½ miles or so (2.5 km), south of the forest boundary, are trackless with a major river crossing. A desolate and extremely remote site, drinking water, paraffin, coal, etc. were delivered by train. The water came from the tender of the engine involved or in milk churns from Fort William as Rannoch Moor's peaty water was too 'brackish' to drink.

In the 1897 regulations for the exchange of goods between the North British Railway and the Caledonian Railway Gortan is recorded as a fully-fledged station.

Circa 1938 a carriage body was placed on the island platform to serve as a school for the railway workers' children, the local shepherd at Gorton, Strathtulla and for others in the immediate area, and was still present in 1960. Children had been educated at the Rannoch Station School using the timetabled trains, however this became overcrowded and a lady teacher made the journey up from Bridge of Orchy to Gorton with up to eleven pupils attending. A school is also marked on the OS map in a location close to Gorton's shepherd's cottage.

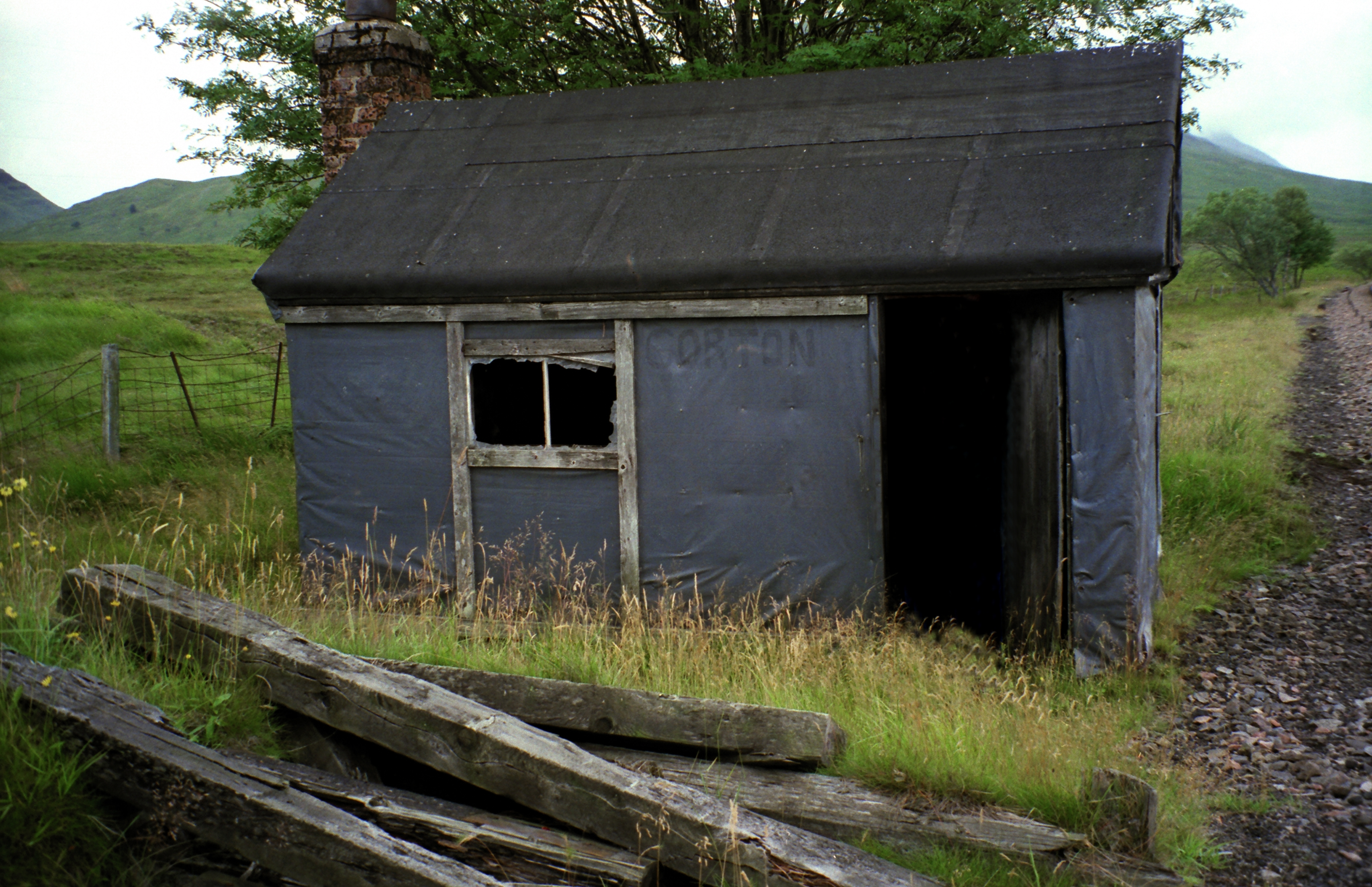
Platemen's bothy on east side of line at north end of platform, 26 August 1996. The dip in the skyline to the left of the bothy is the drovers' route to Glen Lyon.

After closure of the signal box in 1975 due to the difficulty of recruiting signalmen at this location, the loop, previously lifted was reinstated in 1988 as an engineer's siding, not a dedicated crossing loop although it could be switched in as required. The platform has been removed, however controlling ground frames and containers as basic facilities for Network Rail or contractor use are located on site as required. It is a Radio Electronic Token Block exchange point.

Rail tickets to Gorton could be purchased and examples still exist, however it was in many ways more isolated than Corrour.

A platelayers' hut stood on the western side of the tracks near the station on the route towards Rannoch station.

The mail service for those living in Gorton and Strathtulla was via mail pouch from Bridge of Orchy, which was carried by goods trains and delivered to the Gorton signalman.

== Services ==
Preceding station	National Rail	Following station
	Historical railways	
Bridge of Orchy; Line open; Station open	North British Railway; West Highland Railway	Rannoch; Line open; Station open
