= Beinn a' Chleibh =

Scottish mountain

Coordinates: 56.39010°N 4.83570°W

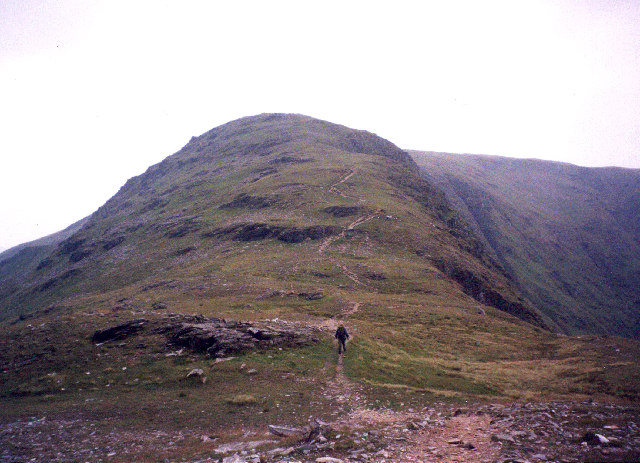
- looking towards the north-east ridge of Beinn a' Chleibh, September 2002

Highest point
- Elevation: 916 m (3,005 ft)
- Prominence: 141 m (463 ft)
- Listing: Munro

Naming
- English translation: Hill of the chest
- Language of name: Gaelic
- Pronunciation: Gaelic [ˈpeiɲ ə ˈxleːv]

Geography
- Location: Argyll and Bute, Scotland
- OS grid: NN25052559
- Topo map: OS Landranger 50

Climbing
- Easiest route: Hike

Beinn a' Chleibh (Gaelic: Beinn a' Chlèibh) is a Scottish mountain. It is linked to Ben Lui by a short ridge.
