= Upper Tyndrum railway station =

Railway station in Stirling, Scotland

Upper Tyndrum Scottish Gaelic: Taigh an Droma Uachdrach
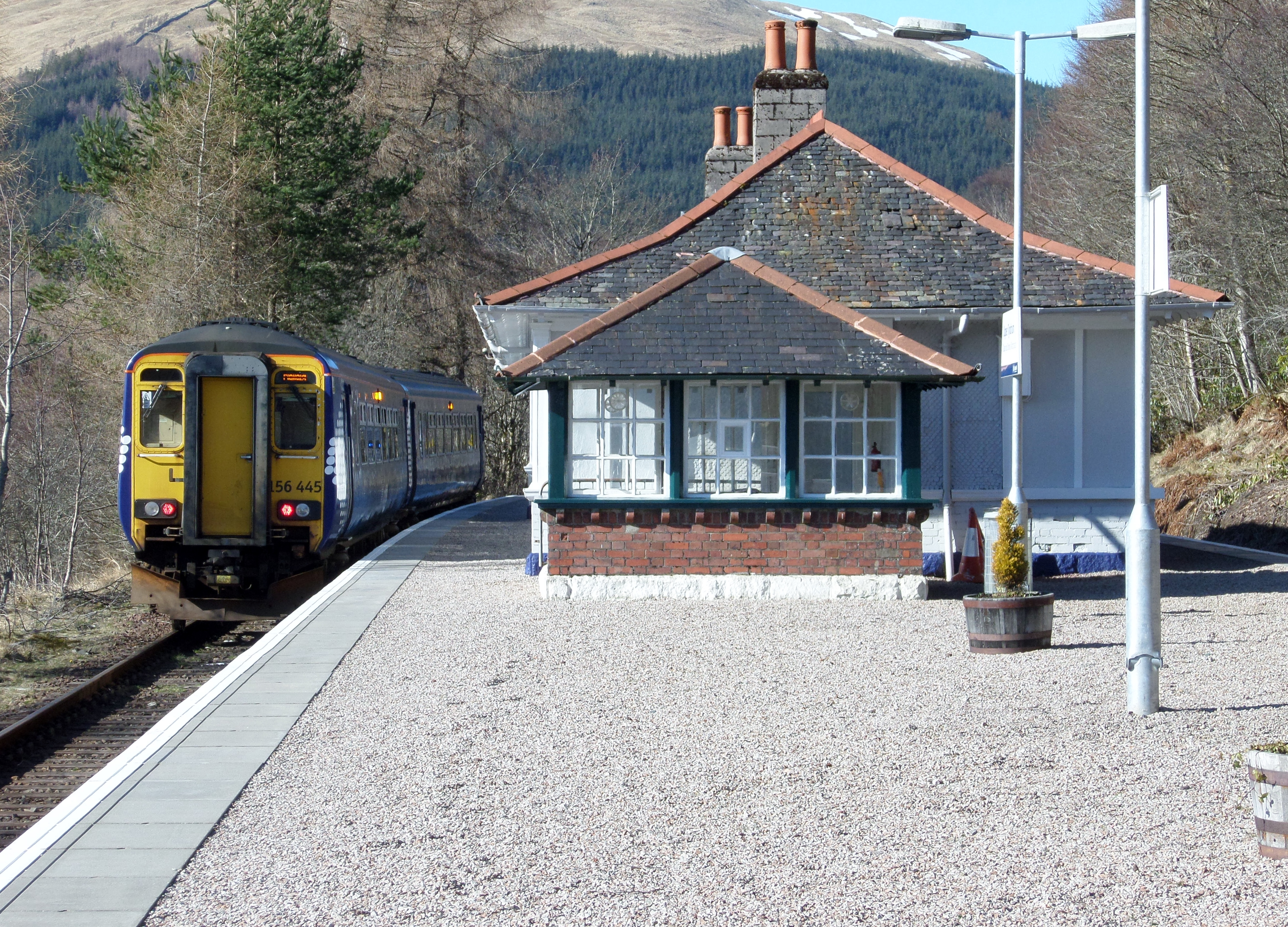
- Upper Tyndrum station, looking north towards Fort William and Mallaig

General information
- Location: Tyndrum, Stirling; Scotland
- Coordinates: 56.4345°N 4.7036°W
- Grid reference: NN333302
- Manager: ScotRail
- Platforms: 2

Other information
- Station code: UTY

History
- Original company: West Highland Railway
- Pre-grouping: North British Railway
- Post-grouping: LNER

Key dates
- 7 August 1894: Station opened as Tyndrum
- 21 September 1956: Station renamed as Tyndrum Upper
- 1988: Station renamed as Upper Tyndrum

Passengers
- 2021/22: ▲3,180
- Interchange: ▲185
- 2022/23: ▲4,076
- Interchange: ▼123
- 2023/24: ▲5,878
- Interchange: ▲214
- 2024/25: ▼5,760
- Interchange: ▼2
- 2025/26: ▲6,958
Location
Notes
- Passenger statistics from the Office of Rail and Road

Upper Tyndrum railway station is one of two railway stations serving the small village of Tyndrum in Scotland. It is on the Fort William route of the scenic West Highland Line, between Crianlarich and Bridge of Orchy, sited 41 miles 25 chains (66.5 km) from Craigendoran Junction, near Helensburgh. Services are operated by ScotRail - who manage the station - and Caledonian Sleeper.

== History ==
Originally named "Tyndrum", this station opened concurrently with the West Highland Railway on 7 August 1894, as the second station in the village. In 1956, British Rail added the suffix "Upper" to the station's name, to distinguish it from the station on the Callander and Oban Line which then became known as Tyndrum Lower. In either 1988 or 1993, it was renamed to Upper Tyndrum.

== Facilities ==
The station only has very basic facilities, being a small car park and some bike racks. The station has no step-free access, the only access being from a subway. As there are no facilities to purchase tickets, passengers must buy one in advance, or from the guard on the train.

== Passenger volume ==
In 2005/06 it was the least used station on the West Highland Line, This is in part because of its position up a hill above the village, as opposed to Tyndrum Lower on the Oban branch, which also offers services to and from Crianlarich and destinations to the south. However, in recent years the Oban line has been served by a core train service, giving Tyndrum Lower a more regular service than Upper Tyndrum, as of May 2025.

Passenger Volume at Upper Tyndrum
	2004–05	2005–06	2006–07	2007–08	2008–09	2009–10	2010–11	2011–12	2012–13	2013–14	2014–15	2015–16	2016–17	2017–18	2018–19	2019–20	2020–21	2021–22	2022–23	2023–24	2024–25
Entries and exits	126	128	7,529	3,228	3,488	3,680	3,784	3,472	3,396	3,940	4,562	4,790	4,512	5,288	5,702	4,736	772	3,180	4,076	5,878	5,760
Interchanges	555	30	13	9	5	15	0	0	0	0	12	12	12	14	30	307	64	185	123	214	2

The statistics cover twelve month periods that start in April.

== Services ==
On weekdays and Saturdays, ScotRail operates three services north to Mallaig, and three south to Glasgow Queen Street. Caledonian Sleeper operates one service each way to Fort William and London Euston (the latter does not run on Saturdays). On Sundays, the service is broadly the same except the early morning trains don't run, There are two services northbound to Mallaig, two services southbound to Glasgow Queen Street, and one service to London Euston.

Preceding station	National Rail	Following station
Crianlarich	ScotRail; West Highland Line	Bridge of Orchy
Crianlarich	Caledonian Sleeper; Highland Caledonian Sleeper	Bridge of Orchy
	Historical railways	
Crianlarich	North British Railway; West Highland Railway	Bridge of Orchy

== Bibliography ==
- Brailsford, Martyn, ed. (December 2017) [1987]. Railway Track Diagrams 1: Scotland & Isle of Man (6th ed.). Frome: Trackmaps. ISBN 978-0-9549866-9-8.
- Butt, R. V. J. (October 1995). The Directory of Railway Stations: details every public and private passenger station, halt, platform and stopping place, past and present (1st ed.). Sparkford: Patrick Stephens Ltd. ISBN 978-1-85260-508-7. OCLC 60251199. OL 11956311M.
- Jowett, Alan (March 1989). Jowett's Railway Atlas of Great Britain and Ireland: From Pre-Grouping to the Present Day (1st ed.). Sparkford: Patrick Stephens Ltd. ISBN 978-1-85260-086-0. OCLC 22311137.
- Jowett, Alan (2000). Jowett's Nationalised Railway Atlas (1st ed.). Penryn, Cornwall: Atlantic Transport Publishers. ISBN 978-0-906899-99-1. OCLC 228266687.
- Quick, Michael (2023). Railway Passenger Stations in Great Britain: A Chronology (PDF) (5th ed.). London: Railway and Canal Historical Society.
