= Ben Oss =

Mountain in Scotland

Coordinates: 56.3904°N 4.7743°W

- Beinn Os
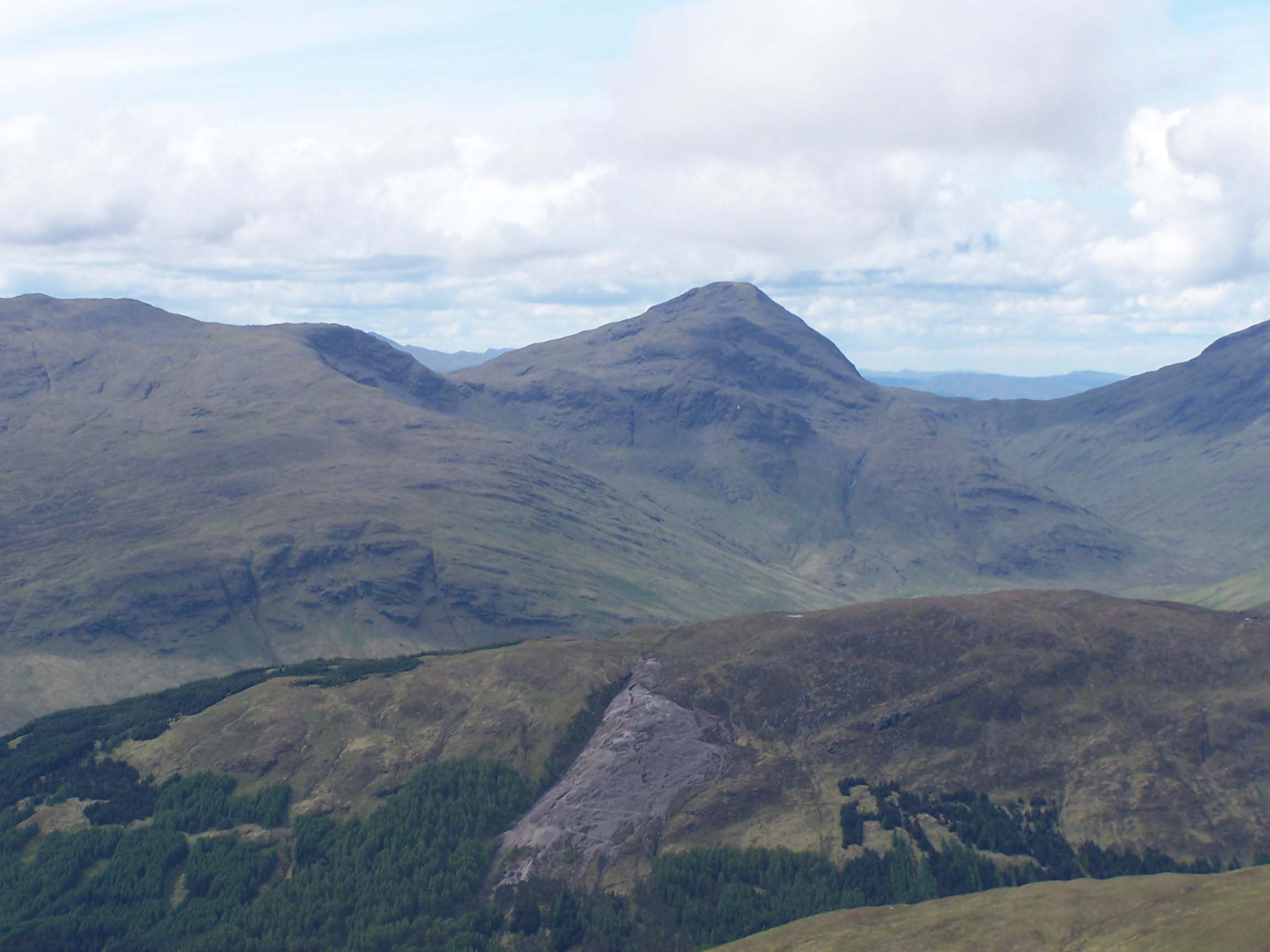
- Ben Oss seen from the high ground to the north of Tyndrum.

Highest point
- Elevation: 1,029 m (3,376 ft)
- Prominence: 342 m (1,122 ft)
- Parent peak: Ben Lui
- Listing: Munro, Marilyn

Naming
- English translation: mountain of the elk
- Language of name: Gaelic
- Pronunciation: Scottish Gaelic: [peɲ ˈɔʃ]

Geography
- Location: Argyll / Perthshire, Scotland
- Parent range: Grampians
- OS grid: NN287253
- Topo map: OS Landranger 50, OS Explorer 364

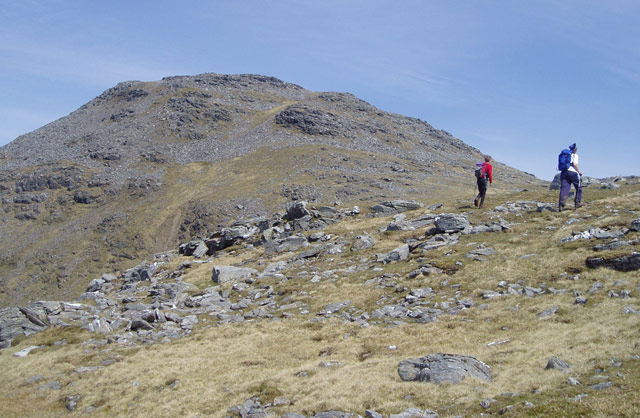
The summit of Ben Oss from its southwest ridge

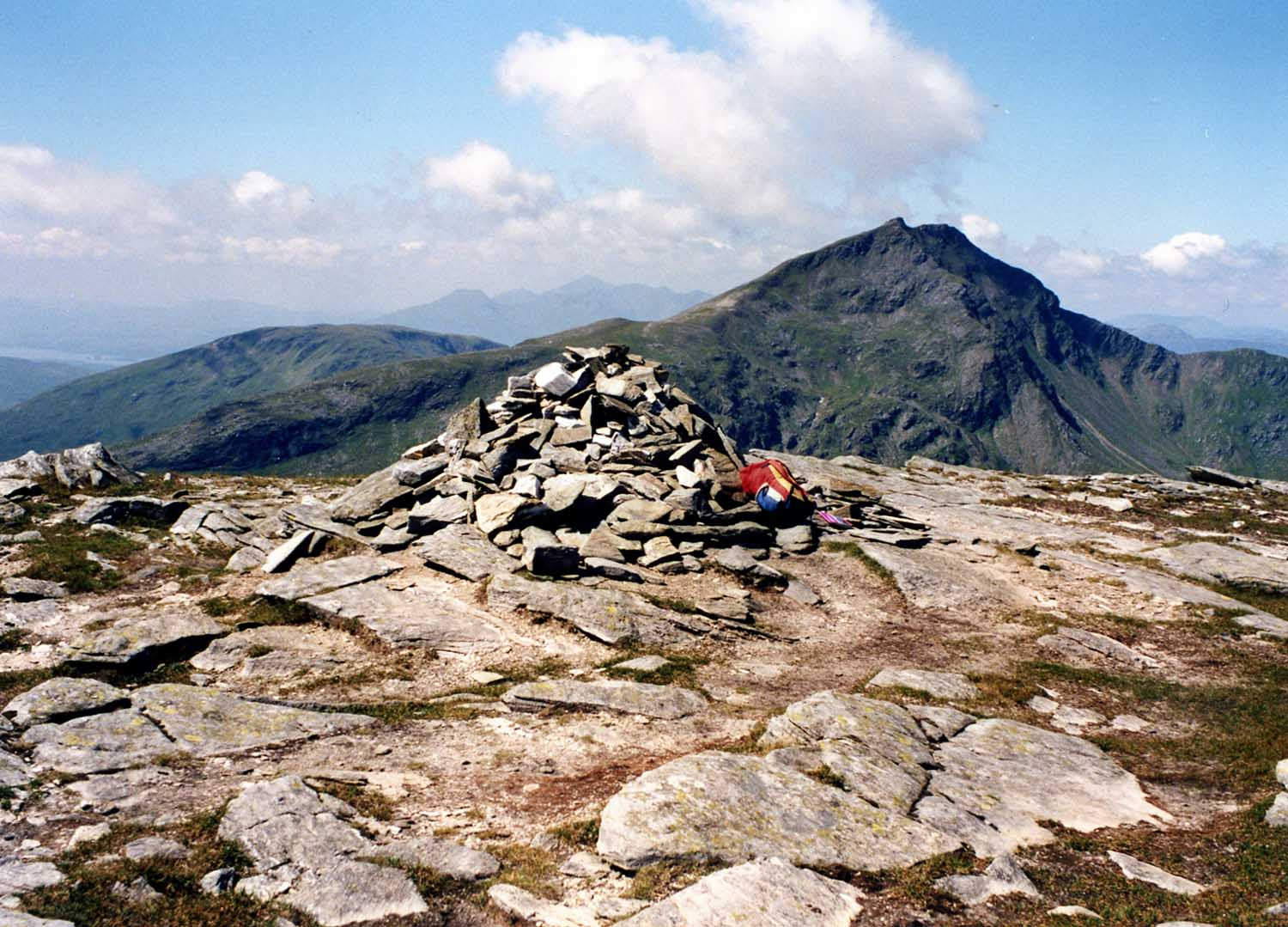
Ben Oss summit cairn with Ben Lui in the background.

Ben Oss (Scottish Gaelic: Beinn Os) is a mountain in the southern Highlands of Scotland. It is a Munro with a height of 1,029 metres (3,376 ft). Ben Oss is on the border of Argyll and Perthshire, southwest of Tyndrum, within Loch Lomond and the Trossachs National Park. It is part of a mountain chain that includes three other Munros. When viewed from the north or south it is seen as a distinct pointed hill in contrast to its more bulky neighbour Beinn Dubhchraig, with which it is usually climbed. The mountain is quite rocky and craggy being composed of mica schist rock.

== Name ==
The name Beinn Os has two possible meanings in Gaelic with guide books being divided on the subject. Os can mean an elk, or a loch outlet, with a lochan and a stream with the same name in the immediate vicinity it implies that the area around Ben Oss was where elk were found before they were hunted to extinction.

== Geography ==
Ben Oss is especially craggy on its northern face, falling away steeply to the Cononish glen and barring any direct approach from this direction. It has two main ridges which connect to the adjacent Munros of Ben Lui and Beinn Dubhchraig and walkers usually arrive at the mountains summit along either of these. One ridge goes north east, east and then south east to form a curving edge around Coire Garbh connecting to Beinn Dubhchraig at the Bealach Buidhe with a height of 779 metres. Coire Garbh has Loch Oss lying within its recesses, a body of water measuring roughly 500 by 300 metres. Coire Buidhe stands on the northern side of this eastern ridge, this has a steep headwall and descents north from the bealach to the Cononish glen are not recommended.

Ben Oss’s other ridge goes south west to a col at the head of Coire Laoigh with a height of 687 metres which links to Ben Lui. Ben Oss’ southern slopes drop less steeply to Glen Falloch and the land at the head of Loch Lomond. Ben Oss lies on the drainage divide of Scotland, all rainfall that falls on the northern slopes drains to the Cononish glen which forms the headwaters of the River Tay and eventually goes to the east coast. Drainage from the southern slopes goes via Glen Falloch and Loch Lomond to reach the sea at the west coast at the Firth of Clyde.

Ben Oss alongside Ben Lui stand at the head of Glen Fyne, a contuation of the sea loch, Loch Fyne at 40 miles (65 kilometres) long in Argyll and Bute.

== Climbing ==
Because of a lack of good access paths from the south (Glen Falloch), Ben Oss is usually climbed from the area just south of Tyndrum, with the usual start being at Dalrigh (grid reference NN343292) on the A82 road. Many guide books recommend climbing Ben Oss with Beinn Dubhchraig from Dalrigh and this allows for a less steep approach over Dubhchraig and then continuing to Ben Oss via the Bealach Buidhe. A circular walk around the head of the Cononish glen can be continued over Ben Lui and Beinn Chuirn to finish again at Dalrigh. The summit of the mountain is flattish and the medium size cairn stands on an area of large slabby rocks interspersed with grass. The summit has a prominence of 342 metres and gives a fine vista of the southern highlands, it is a good place to admire the craggy eastern face of neighbouring Ben Lui.
