= Beinn Dubhchraig =

Mountain in Scotland

Coordinates: 56.3912°N 4.7426°W

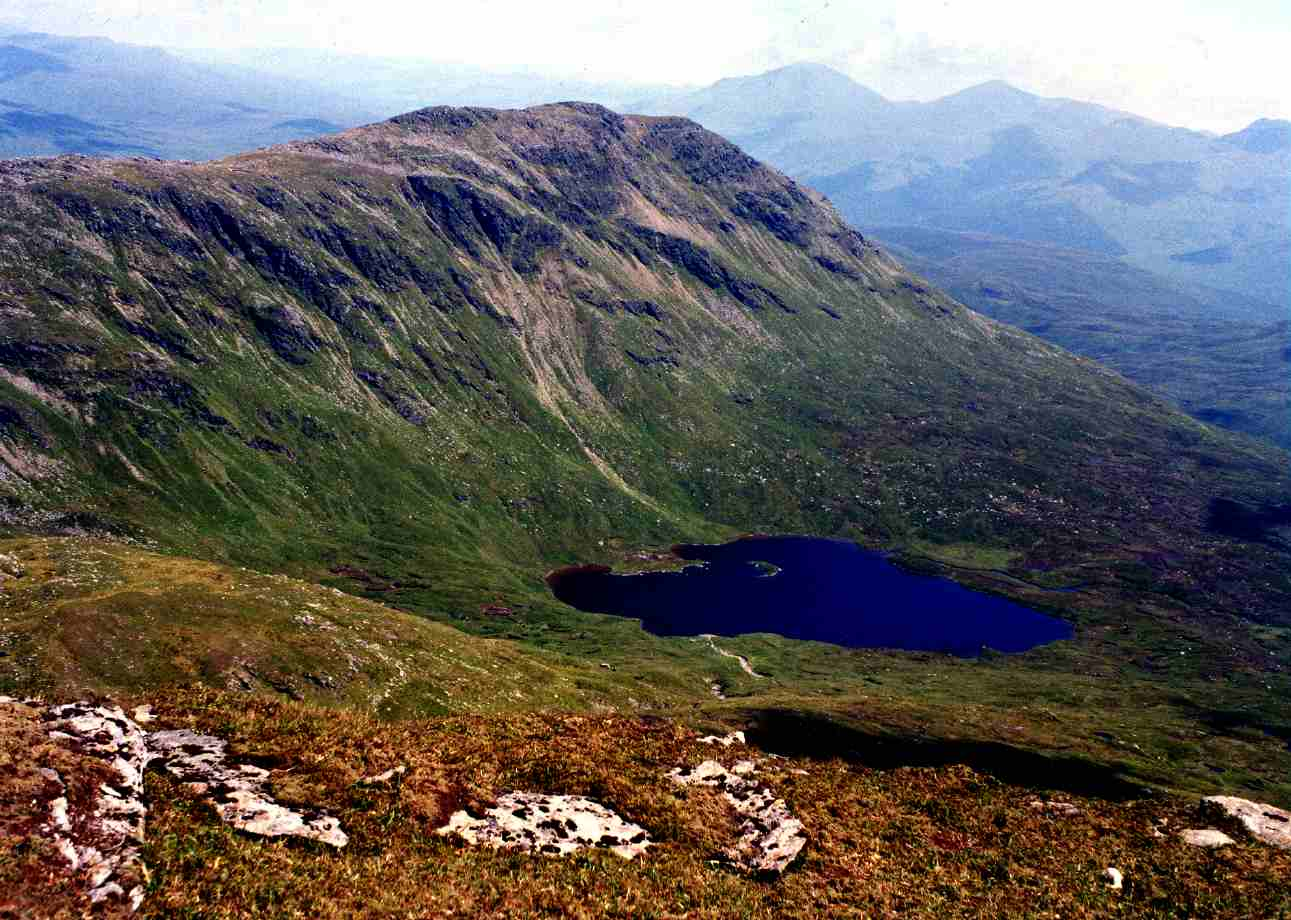
- Beinn Dubhchraig seen from Ben Oss across Coire Garbh and Loch Oss.

Highest point
- Elevation: 978 m (3,209 ft)
- Prominence: 199 m (653 ft)
- Parent peak: Ben Oss
- Listing: Munro, Marilyn

Naming
- English translation: mountain of the black rock
- Language of name: Gaelic
- Pronunciation: Scottish Gaelic: [peɲ ˈt̪uxɾʲekʲ]

Geography
- Location: Stirlingshire, Scotland
- Parent range: Grampians
- OS grid: NN308254
- Topo map: OS Landranger 50, OS Explorer 364

Beinn Dubhchraig (Scottish Gaelic: Beinn Dubhchreig) is a mountain in the Scottish Highlands, west of Crianlarich in the northern part of Loch Lomond and the Trossachs National Park. It is a Munro with a height of 978 metres (3,209 ft). It is overshadowed by its neighbour Ben Lui, although it is well seen from the main A82 road. Its name means "mountain of the black rock", referring to the steep and rocky face on the southwest slopes above Loch Oss, which offer scrambling routes to the summit.

== Geography and Biology ==
Beinn Dubhchraig stands in a group of mountains which rise around the headwaters of the River Cononish and includes two other Munros (Ben Lui and Ben Oss) and the Corbett Beinn Chuirn. The glen of Cononish and the four mountains make up the Ben Lui National Nature Reserve, an area which attracts many biologists who come to study the profusion of mountain plants which grow on the moist rocky cliffs and outcrops. The soil in the reserve is of low acidity and saxifrages grow in abundance. Large herds of deer can be found in the corries around the mountain.

The mountain stands in an area that has always been popular for hill walking, even before the advent of the motor car, Tyndrum's two railway stations gave easy access to these hills. Beinn Dubhchraig's best topographic feature is its northern corrie which forms a large basin between the north and north east ridges, the corrie is drained by the Allt Coire Dubchraig which flows north east to join the River Fillan. At the foot of the northern corrie are remnants of an old Scots Pine wood of Coille Coire Chuilc, part of the former Caledonian Forest. These northern foothills of the mountain were once heavily mined for lead and there are still prominent scars on the hillside. The Clan Campbell wrecked the mine workings in 1745 as they were then owned by a prominent Jacobite Sir Robert Clifton. The mine workings closed eventually in 1923.

Beinn Dubhchraig is linked to the adjacent Munro of Ben Oss, which lies two kilometres to the west, by the Bealach Buidhe which has a height of 779 metres. The ridge down to the bealach is broad and holds a few small lochans within the schist rock hollows. There are corries to both the north and south of the bealach. Coire Garbh to the south holds Loch Oss, a sheet of water measuring roughly 500 metres by 300 metres with a small island located within it. To the north of the bealach is Coire Buidhe which has a very steep headwall which prevents a direct descent from the bealach down to the Cononish valley to the north. To the east, Beinn Dubhchraig falls to the valley of Gleann Auchreoch, much of these lower eastern slopes were planted with conifers in the early 1970s and have become an obstacle to approaches to the mountain from that direction.

== Ascents ==
The ascent of Beinn Dubchraig starts from the hamlet of Dalrigh on the A82 at grid reference NN343292 and takes the track which crosses the railway and follows the Allt Coire Dubchraig through the wood. The track becomes more muddy and crosses three deer fences by stiles to reach the open mountainside from where it is possible to ascend the northern corrie direct to reach the summit plateau just to the north west of the highest point. Beinn Dubhchraig is often climbed in conjunction with some or all of the mountains around the Cononish valley. The view from the summit gives fine views of the mountains of Breadalbane to the west and the twin Munros of Ben More and Stob Binnein are well seen to the south east.
