= Ben Lui =

1130m high mountain in Stirling, Scotland

Coordinates: 56.39704°N 4.81110°W

- Beinn Laoigh
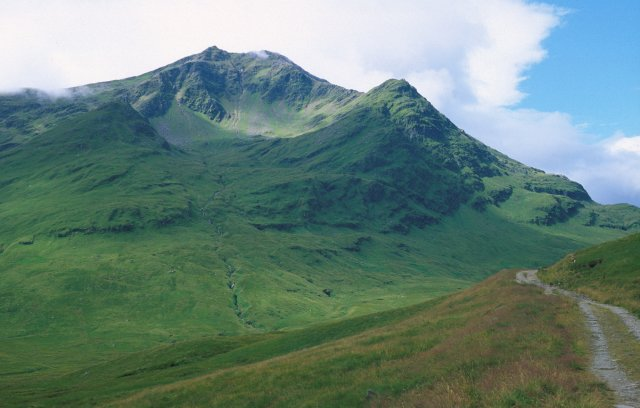
- Ben Lui from the north

Highest point
- Elevation: 1,130 m (3,710 ft)
- Prominence: 875 m (2,871 ft); Ranked 15th in British Isles
- Parent peak: Ben More
- Listing: Munro, Marilyn

Naming
- English translation: calf mountain
- Pronunciation: Scottish Gaelic: [peɲ ˈl̪ˠɤj]

Geography
- Location: Argyll, Scotland
- Parent range: Grampian Mountains
- OS grid: NN266263
- Topo map: OS Landranger 50

Ben Lui (Scottish Gaelic: Beinn Laoigh) is a mountain in the southern Highlands of Scotland. It is a Munro with a height of 1,130 metres (3,710 ft). Ben Lui is in northeast Argyll and is the highest peak of a mountain chain that includes three other Munros. It has five well-defined ridges radiating out from the summit. Four corries lie between the ridges, including Coirre Gaothaich on the northeast side of the mountain.

== Landscape ==
Ben Lui is the highest and most famous of a group of four Munros that lie south of Glen Lochy, and about 10 km north of the top end of Loch Lomond. The other three Munros in the group are Beinn a' Chleibh, Ben Oss and Beinn Dubhchraig.

Ben Lui stands on the main watershed of Scotland, and is a 'nodal peak', with its waters draining east to the Tay and North Sea, south to Loch Lomond and the Firth of Clyde, and west to the Lochy and Atlantic. It also appears to stand at the head of Glen Fyne, but waters which may once have flowed south-west to it are now captured east with a 50-metre-wide separating bar only a few metres high. Secondary divides which radiated north-east and east before glaciers cut across them have higher peaks along them – Ben Lawers, Ben More – which are subordinate in status.

A lochan on the slopes of Ben Lui has been identified as the source of Scotland's longest river, the Tay.

The Ben Lui range of peaks was formerly a National Nature Reserve. The cliffs and rocky outcrops are particularly moist, with lower than normal levels of acidity in the soil. This leads to an unusually lush growth of mountain plants, with saxifrages, mosses and lichens being especially evident.

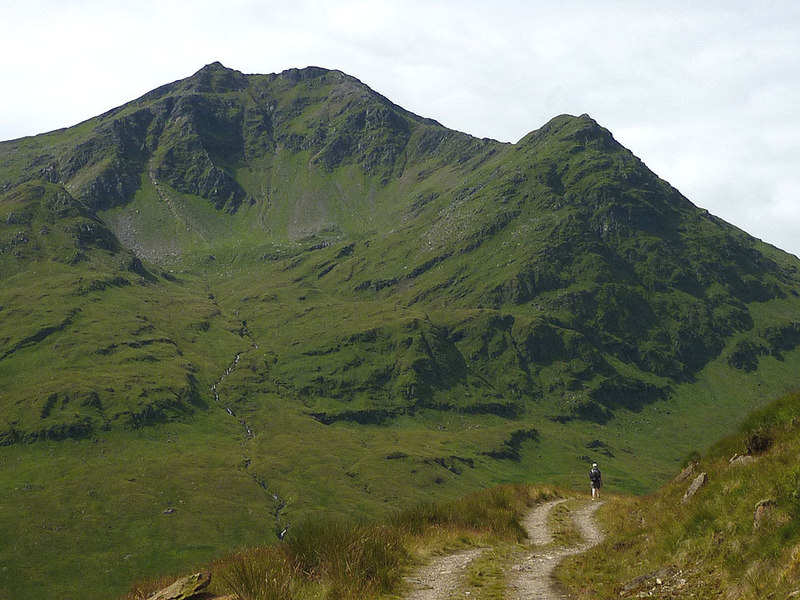
Another view of Ben Lui from the north, with Stob Garbh on the right

== Climbing ==
The simplest and shortest ascent of Ben Lui may be made from Glen Lochy, near the point where the burn of Eas Daimh flows into the Lochy. A path leads up through an area of forestry and then onto the northwest ridge, reaching the summit in just over 3 km. Descent may be varied by visiting Beinn a' Chleibh, which lies 2 km to the south west.

An approach from the east allows for appreciation of the mountain's most celebrated feature, the rocky circular bowl of Coire Gaothaich. One may either start from Tyndrum Lower station or Dalrigh in Strath Fillan; tracks from both starting points merge, and follow Glen Cononish (notable for its goldmine) to the foot of Ben Lui. From here the route follows the northern ridge of the mountain, Stob Garbh, to the summit, the distance being about 9 km. This route is particularly treacherous in winter, even as late as April, when the final third of the ascent is often extremely icy. Furthermore, it can be extremely difficult to navigate through the crags around the upper rim of the Coire Gaothaich in poor visibility.

By descending via the south east ridge the walker may elect to include Ben Oss (and possibly Beinn Dubhcraig) in the route before returning to the start. If transport can be arranged, a reasonably fit hillwalker can traverse all four Munros of the Ben Lui group in a day.

== See also ==
- List of Munro mountains
- Mountains and hills of Scotland
