= Tyndrum =

Coordinates: 56.436°N 4.712°W

Tyndrum: Scottish Gaelic: Taigh an Droma
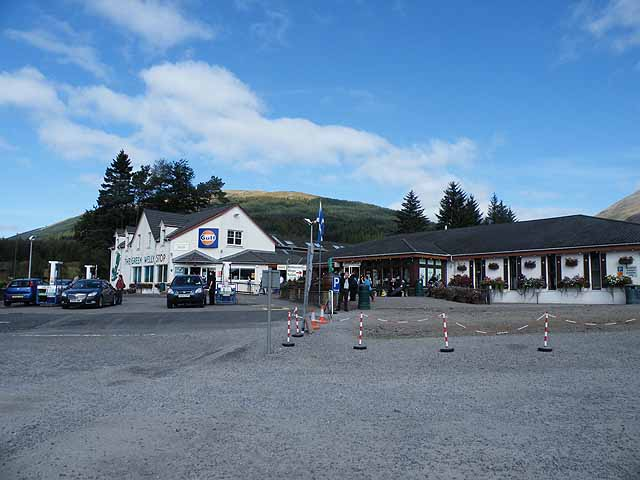
- The Green Welly Stop

- Location within the Stirling council area
- Population: 167
- OS grid reference: NN 32901 30396
- Civil parish: Killin
- Council area: Stirling
- Lieutenancy area: Stirling and Falkirk
- Country: Scotland
- Sovereign state: United Kingdom
- Post town: CRIANLARICH
- Postcode district: FK20
- Dialling code: 01838
- UK Parliament: Stirling & Strathallan
- Scottish Parliament: Stirling

Tyndrum (/taɪnˈdrʌm/; Scottish Gaelic: Taigh an Droma) is a small village in Scotland. Its Gaelic name translates as "the house on the ridge". It lies in Strath Fillan, at the southern edge of Rannoch Moor.

== Location and facilities ==
Tyndrum is a popular tourist village, and a noted stop on the A82 for road travellers to refresh at the Green Welly Stop or one of the several other cafés and hotels. There is a filling station. The village is on the West Highland Way, and has a campsite, hotel, bunkhouse and bed and breakfasts to accommodate walkers.

Overshadowed by Ben Lui, a Munro, Tyndrum is built over the battlefield where Clan MacDougall defeated Robert the Bruce in 1306, and supposedly took from him the Brooch of Lorn.

== Transport ==
=== Railways ===
The village is notable as a junction of transport routes. The West Highland Line railway from Glasgow splits approximately 5 miles (8 km) to the south at Crianlarich, with one branch heading to Fort William and the other to Oban. Tyndrum has a station on each branch: Upper Tyndrum on the Fort William line and Tyndrum Lower on the Oban line. Thus unusually there are two stations serving the same small village, only a few hundred yards apart, but about 10 miles (16 km) apart by rail.

Indeed, Tyndrum is the smallest settlement in the UK with more than one railway station. This is partly a legacy of the history of the railways in the area, after two separate railways belonging to different railway companies were built through the village. However, the main reason is geography: splitting the line in Crianlarich allows the contours of the glen to be used to avoid very steep climbs heading north or west from Tyndrum. Roads mirror this division: the A82 from Glasgow to Fort William passes through Tyndrum, and the A85 to Oban splits off just north of the village.

=== Buses ===
Buses are run by Ember, Scottish Citylink, Midland Bluebird and West Coast Motors.

== Mines ==
Tyndrum is a former mining centre. The hamlet of Clifton (the row of cottages across the A82 from the Green Welly) is made up of the former mining cottages, and up the hillside beyond them the tailings of a former lead mine can be seen. Historical records indicate that the mine was exploited in several different phases between 1730 and 1928. Opencast mining was carried out from 1741 to 1745 under the orders of Sir Robert Clifton. The Scots Mining Company owned the mineral rights to the area from 1768 to 1791, introducing water-powered crushing machinery.

A church was built at Clifton in 1829 by Lady Glenorchy, which was reported in 1846 as being used by the Free Church of Scotland.

The site of a gold mine is two miles (three kilometres) to the south and west of Tyndrum at Cononish, above Cononish Farm. Work on constructing the mine began in the 1980s but low gold prices forced the closure of the mine before it became fully operational. In October 2011 it was announced that the mine would be reactivated. It was expected to employ 52 people and produce 163,000 troy ounces (5,100 kg) of gold and 596,000 ozt (18,500 kg) of silver over the next 10 years, thereby generating an estimated £80 million for the Scottish economy. Following planning difficulties, which featured in the BBC Four programme Tales from the National Parks, and a fall in the price of gold, opening of the mine was again delayed. In an update on the project released by Scotgold in May 2015, total ore reserves are now estimated at 198,000 ozt (6,200 kg) of gold and 851,000 ozt (26,500 kg) of silver. In July 2023, Scotgold began a review of its activities following disappointing production figures and suspended share trading in September 2023.
