= Signal boxes that are listed buildings in England =

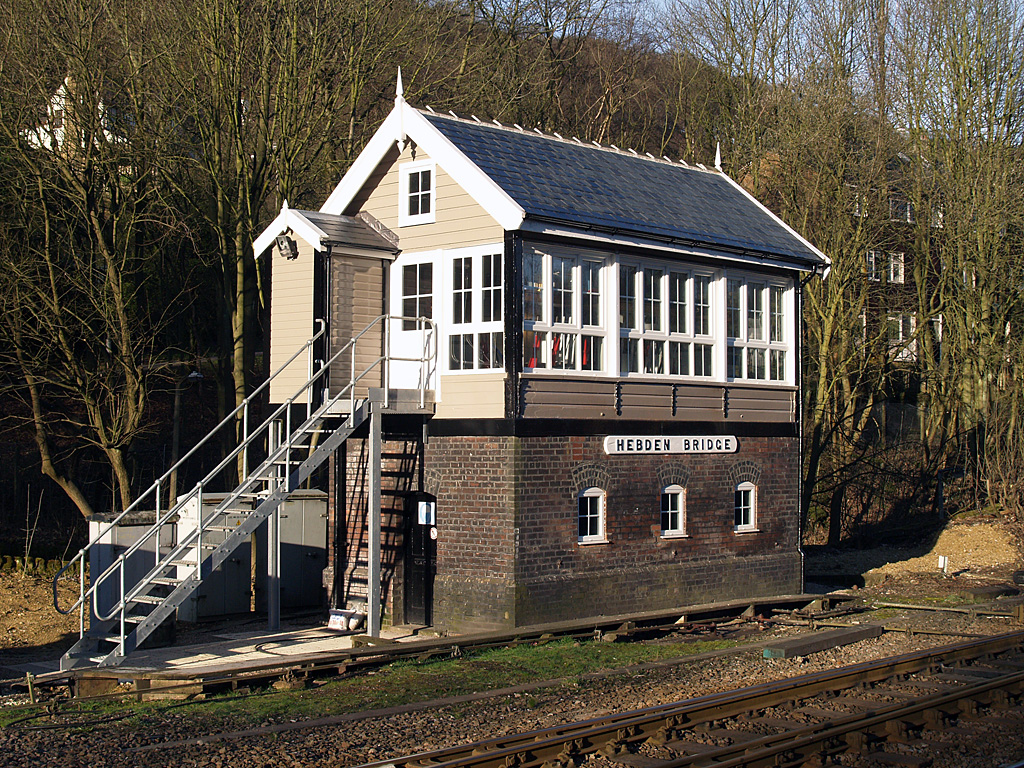
Hebden Bridge signal box

A number of signal boxes in England are on the Statutory List of Buildings of Special Architectural or Historic Interest. Signal boxes house the signalman and equipment that control the railway points and signals. Originally, railway signals were controlled from a hut on a platform at junctions. In the 1850s, a raised building with a glazed upper storey containing levers controlling points and signals was developed after John Saxby obtained a patent in 1856 for a mechanical system of interlocking the points and signals. Over half of the signalboxes before 1923 were built by private signalling contractors, the largest being Saxby & Farmer; Stevens & Sons, McKenzie & Holland, the Railway Signal Co., Dutton & Co and Evans, and O'Donnell & Co. Some railway companies had a standard signalbox design, such as the London & North Western Railway, whereas others, such as the Great Eastern Railway had many different designs.

Listed buildings are given one of three grades: Grade I for buildings of exceptional interest, Grade II* for particularly important buildings of more than special interest and Grade II for buildings that are of special interest. In 1948 there were approximately 10,000 signal boxes; by 2012 this had reduced to about 500. National Rail has plans to concentrate control at twelve centres by 2040, decommissioning most of the remaining mechanical signal boxes by 2025. A joint Historic England and Network Rail project listed 26 signal boxes in July 2013.

Signal boxes and swing bridge cabins are listed Grade II, except for those noted as Grade II*.

== Signal boxes ==
Name	Image	Location	Date	Notes
Ais Gill		Derbyshire (Midland Railway – Butterley) SK4037851962	1906	This Midland Railway Type 2a design signal box was rebuilt c. 1985 at Butterley railway station, Midland Railway – Butterley
Appleby		North Lincolnshire SE9522612871	1885	Built by the Railway Signal Co. of Fazakerley, Liverpool for the Manchester, Sheffield and Lincolnshire Railway
Arnside		Cumbria SD4597578967	1897	A Furness Railway Type 4 box containing a 1943 London Midland Region 35-lever frame installed in 1957
Askam		Cumbria SD2148277674	1890	A Furness Railway Type 2 signal box
Attleborough		Norfolk TM0517195034	1883	The signal box built for the Norfolk Railway, listed with the earlier station buildings, contains a lever frame dating from 1912.
Aylesford		Kent; TQ7205658680	1921	The first signal box to be built by the South Eastern & Chatham Railway to a new design that was adopted by Southern Railway after grouping
Baschurch		Shropshire SJ4293222691	1880	The signal box is listed with the adjacent signal. This Mackenzie and Holland type 3 box was built for the Great Western Railway and refitted in 1911.
Beckingham		Nottinghamshire SK7858289819	1877	A Great Northern Railway Type 1 box
Aiskew; Bedale		North Yorkshire SE2685588307	c. 1860	Possibly designed by G.T. Andrews
Berwick (Sussex)		East Sussex TQ5262106761	1879	A Saxby & Farmer Type 5 design built for the London, Brighton & South Coast Railway, containing the original Saxby & Farmer 17-lever frame
Beverley		East Riding of Yorkshire TA0386639525	1911	A North Eastern Railway (Southern Division) Type 4 box
Billingshurst		West Sussex; Amberley Museum	1876	Built for the London, Brighton and South Coast Railway. This is the last Saxby & Farmer Type 1b box in existence, and probably was used elsewhere before it moved to Billingshurst in 1876. The 17-lever frame, however, dates from 1876. The signal box closed on 14 March 2014 and was moved to Amberley Museum just over a week later. Note: It is not clear if the box is still listed since it was moved. English Heritage have not clarified what happens if a listed building is moved.
Birkdale		Merseyside (Sefton) SD3302915790	1905	Built by the Lancashire and Yorkshire Railway, with the original 24-lever frame
Birmingham New Street Signal Box		Birmingham SP0671986672	1964	Built by British Rail London Midland Region, designed by Bicknell and Hamilton with R L Moorcraft
Blankney (now Metheringham)		Lincolnshire TF0776361373	1928	A Great Northern Railway Type 4 design built by the London & North Eastern Railway
Bollo Lane Junction (near South Acton)		Greater London TQ2001779017	Probably 1878	A London & South Western Railway Type 2 box
Bootle		Cumbria SD0935989318	1874	A Furness Railway Type 1 box, containing a London Midland Region 15-lever frame installed in 1977
Bournemouth West Junction		Dorset (Poole) SZ0635791871	1882	A London & South Western Railway Type 3a box containing a Steven's 24-lever frame
Brading		Isle of Wight SZ6099086886	1882	Built for the Isle of Wight Railway
Bridlington South		East Riding of Yorkshire TA1755266776	1893	Built for the North Eastern Railway
Brocklesby Junction (Near Ulceby)		North Lincolnshire TA1189013565	1914	Built by the Great Central Railway
Bromley Cross		Lancashire SD7295513055	1875	A Smith and Yardley Type 1 design built for the Lancashire and Yorkshire Railway
Burton Agnes		East Riding of Yorkshire TA1078162367	1870/5	A North Eastern Railway (Southern Division) S1b box
Bury St Edmunds Yard		Suffolk TL8500665180	1888	A Great Eastern Railway Type 7 box containing the original McKenzie & Holland lever frame
Canterbury East		Kent; TR1472457251	c. 1911	A South Eastern & Chatham Railway box developed from the Saxby & Farmer Type 5 design. Contains an earlier London, Chatham & Dover Railway lever frame from c. 1878.
Canterbury West		Kent; TR1463558509	1928	An early non-standard Southern Railway design
Carnforth (original)		Lancashire SD4969270834	30 January 1882	An early Furness Railway box designed in the same style as the station
Carnforth		Lancashire SD4960070735	1903	A Furness Railway Type 4 box
Chappel and Wakes Colne		Essex TL8979128926	1891	A Great Eastern Railway Type 7 box, moved to the East Anglian Railway Museum
Chathill		Northumberland NU1864727003	c. 1873	A North Eastern Railway (Northern Division) Type N1 design
Chesham		Buckinghamshire SP9608501611	1889	Built by the Metropolitan Railway
Chichester		West Sussex SU8559204311	1889	A Saxby & Farmer Type 5 design built for the London, Brighton & South Coast Railway
Crawley		West Sussex TQ2673836364	c. 1860	This was probably one of the earliest signal boxes with John Saxby's patented interlocking of points and signals.
Crediton		Devon SX8389499502	c. 1862 or 1875	Probably for the London & South Western Railway, described as a typical early (Type 1) design
Cromer		Norfolk TG2123242007	1920	Built by William Marriott for the Midland & Great Northern Joint Railway, containing the 35-lever frame installed in 1954
Cross keys bridge		Lincolnshire; River Nene; TF4821721030	1897	The swing bridge, originally built by A. Handyside & Co. for both road and rail, contains a signal cablin. Now only used for road. Listed Grade II*.
Cuxton		Medway, Kent TQ7141966715	possibly late 1887 – 1889	A South Eastern Railway box containing a South Eastern Railway 7-inch (180 mm) Brady lever frame, possibly from 1892
Daisyfield		Lancashire (Blackburn with Darwen) SD6934628770	1873	A Saxby & Farmer Type 6 box built for the Lancashire & Yorkshire Railway
Downham Market		Norfolk TF6027903292	1881	Great Eastern Railway type 2 with original Saxby & Farmer rocker frame
East Holmes		Lincolnshire SK9726271032	1873	A Great Northern Railway Type 1 box, fitted in 1910 with a 35-lever frame by McKenzie & Holland
Eastbourne		East Sussex TV6120299310	1882	A Saxby & Farmer Type 5 for the London, Brighton and South Coast Railway, with a 72-lever frame from 1935
Eastfield		Peterborough TL1827299881	1894	A Great Northern Railway Type 1 box together with a 65-lever frame, said to have been installed in 1940
Ecclesfield West		Sheffield SK3633694363	Late 19th century	A Midland Railway signal box. Minnis reported in 2012 that this had been demolished.
Elsham		North Lincolnshire TA0197110449	1885	Built by Railway Signal Co. of Fazakerley, Liverpool, for the Manchester, Sheffield & Lincolnshire Railway
Embsay		North Yorkshire SE0078753266	c. 1923	A Midland Railway Type 4D box, built by the London, Midland and Scottish Railway, containing a Midland Railway 20-lever frame
Falsgrave signal box, Falsgrave (Scarborough)		North Yorkshire TA0368287943	1908	A North Eastern Railway (Southern Division) Type 4 box with original 120-lever frame
Feock (near Perranwell)		Cornwall SW7909239496	c. 1854	English Heritage entry states that this was built for the Chacewater Railway, but Minnis reports that it was not a signal box.
Garsdale		Cumbria SD7888291835	1910	A Midland Railway Type 4c box built on the Settle to Carlisle Line. This was the location of the 1910 Hawes Junction train collision.
Gorse Hill Bridges		Wiltshire SU1095389764	c. 1870	Built by Saxby & Farmer for the Broad Gauge Great Western Railway near Swindon. English Heritage entry states that it was subsequently moved and gives its location as that of the heritage Blunsdon railway station, but Minnis reported in 2012 that it no longer exists.
Goole Swing Bridge		East Riding of Yorkshire; River Ouse; SE7649924707	1869	The swing bridge houses a signal cabin and was designed by Thomas Elliot Harrison for the North Eastern Railway. Listed Grade II*.
Grain Crossing (Isle of Grain)		Medway, Kent TQ8631375286	1882	An early, largely unaltered Stevens & Sons signal box built for the South Eastern Railway. Contains a South Eastern Railway 9-lever frame and cast iron token machine.
Hale		Greater Manchester (Trafford) SJ7697486907	1862 and 1880s	A box built for the Cheshire Lines Committee
Haltwhistle		Northumberland NY7049463800	Late 19th century	A non-standard North Eastern Railway box
Hammerton railway station signal cabin		North Yorkshire SE4701655829	1914	Built by the North Eastern Railway (Southern Division), this is a large cupboard on the station platform containing a 10-lever McKenzie & Holland frame.
Haslemere		Surrey SU8974332916	1895	A London & South Western Railway Type 4 design containing the original 47-lever Stevens (Railway Signalling Co.) lever frame with associated block instruments
Havant		Hampshire SU7204806564	c. 1890	A large Saxby & Farmer Type 5 built for the London, Brighton & South Coast Railway. The box was extended and refitted c. 1938 with a Westinghouse 70-lever frame.
Hebden Bridge		West Yorkshire (Calderdale) SD9957226758	1891	A Lancashire & Yorkshire Railway box containing its original L&YR 36-lever frame, together with two levers added later. There is also an L&YR three-position Absolute Block Instrument and Block Bell.
Heckington		Lincolnshire TF1459743575	1876	A Great Northern Railway Type 1 built by Joseph Locke, with a Saxby & Farmer lever frame from 1925
Heighington		County Durham NZ2711122536	1872	Possibly built by Thomas Prosser for the North Eastern Railway (Central Division). The lever frame dates from 1906 and the box was extended c. 1912.
Helsby Junction		Cheshire West and Chester SJ4868575656	1900	A London & North Western Railway Type 4 box, with its original lever frame
Hensall		North Yorkshire SE5852022803	1875	Built by E. S. Yardley & Co for the Lancashire & Yorkshire Railway, refitted in 1964 with a reconditioned McKenzie & Holland 10-lever frame
Hertford East		Hertfordshire TL3322713021	1888	A Great Eastern Railway 1880s standard design, frame expanded to take 45 levers in the 1930s
Hexham		Northumberland NY9425264187	1897	A North Eastern Railway (Northern Division) Type 5 on a bridge over the railway
High Street (Lincoln)		Lincolnshire SK9746770942	1874	A Great Northern Railway Type 1, retaining the 36-lever frame of 1892, extended in 1925
Holmwood		Surrey TQ1741943737	c. 1876	A Saxby & Farmer Type 5 for the London, Brighton & South Coast Railway. Contains the original lever frame, W. R. Sykes block instruments, signal and track circuit repeaters.
Horsham		West Sussex TQ1801231288	1938	A British Railways Southern Region International Modern Style type 13
Horsted Keynes South		West Sussex TQ3708729183	c. 1882	London, Brighton & South Coast Railway Type 1, probably designed by T. H. Myres to complement the branch line stations
Howden		East Riding of Yorkshire SE7522430415	1873	A North Eastern Railway (Southern Division) type 1A
Instow		Devon SS4736130117	1861 or 1874	Built by the Bideford Extension Railway (later London & South Western Railway) to the London & South Western Railway Type 1 design
Isfield		East Sussex TQ4519917080	c. 1880	Built by Saxby & Farmer for the London, Brighton & South Coast Railway
Kettering		Derbyshire (Midland Railway – Butterley)	c. 1865	A Midland Railway signal box rebuilt in 1985−1986 at Swanwick Junction railway station, Midland Railway – Butterley
Keighley Station Junction		West Yorkshire (Bradford) SE0644441413	1884	A Midland Railway Type 2a signal box
Kilby Bridge		Derbyshire (Midland Railway – Butterley) SK3983651926	c. 1865	A Midland Railway signal box, rebuilt 1986–9 for use at Hammersmith, Midland Railway – Butterley
Kirkham Abbey		North Yorkshire SE7331065731	c. 1856	English Heritage listing says this was probably designed by G. T. Andrews for the York & North Midland Railway. Alternatively, Minnis gives a date of c. 1873 and lists this as a Great Northern Railway (Southern Division) Type S1b box.
Kirton Lime Sidings; Hibaldstow		North Lincolnshire SE9504201386	1886	Built by the Railway Signal Co. for the Manchester, Sheffield & Lincolnshire Railway
Knaresborough		North Yorkshire SE3477457103	1872	A non-standard North Eastern Railway design. The upper-floor was rebuilt, probably in 1890.
Leek Brook Junction		Staffordshire SJ9811853759	late 1860s	Built by McKenzie & Holland for the North Staffordshire Railway. The 40-lever McKenzie & Holland No. 6 frame was installed in 1903, when the line to the east opened.
Littlehampton		West Sussex TQ0228702302	1886	A London, Brighton & South Coast Railway Type 2 box. The LB&SCR Bosham pattern 44-lever frame was installed in 1901.
Liverpool Street (Circle line)		Greater London TQ3306681579	1875	Built by McKenzie & Holland for the Metropolitan Railway. The 15-lever Westinghouse and Saxby frame and control panel were installed in 1954.
London Road, Boston		Lincolnshire; River Witham; TF3264243066	1884	A signal box protecting a swing bridge containing a Saxby & Farmer 12-lever frame
Lostwithiel		Cornwall SX1068759798	1893	A Great Western Railway type 5 box, containing a 63-lever frame installed in 1923
Loughborough North		Leicestershire (Great Central Railway) SK5432319704	1898	A Great Central Railway Type 4 box
Louth North		Lincolnshire TF3323488134	1886	A Great Northern Railway type GNR1 (East Lincolnshire)
Maidstone West		Kent; TQ7554055120	4 June 1899	An Evans, O'Donnell & Company standard-design box built for the South Eastern and Chatham Railway, containing the original 115-lever frame and block instruments by Evans, O'Donnell & Company
March East Junction		Cambridgeshire TL4198397821	1885	Built by Saxby & Farmer, a Great Eastern Railway Type 5 with a lever frame from 1897
Marsh Brook		Shropshire SO4419789866	1872	London and North Western/Great Western Railway Type 1, built for the Shrewsbury and Hereford Joint Railway
Marston Moor		North Yorkshire SE5110354562	1910	Built by the North Eastern Railway (Southern Division) and containing six levers of a 16-lever 1873 pattern McKenzie & Holland frame
Monk's Siding		Lancashire (Warrington) SJ5918387712	1875	London & North Western Railway Type 3 design with the original lever frame
Nafferton		East Riding of Yorkshire TA0585158435	1906	A North Eastern Railway signal box. In 2012 Minnis reported that it had been demolished.
New Bridge		North Yorkshire Moors Railway SE8028485386	1876	North Eastern Railway (Southern Division) Type S1a
Norham		Northumberland NT9066846775	1911	Built by the North Eastern Railway reusing an earlier first floor system. The railway station closed in 1965 and sold, but was preserved and open to the public until 2010.
Norton East		County Durham NZ4318622496	1870	Built by the North Eastern Railway (Central Division) orientated gable-end to the tracks and with a glazed side extension to the operating floor, the box is fitted with a 25-lever frame from 1959.
Nunthorpe		North Yorkshire (Redcar and Cleveland) NZ5387015025	1903	Built by the North Eastern Railway (Central Division) to its type C2b design, this box contains a reconditioned McKenzie & Holland 16-lever frame and a wheel for opening the level crossing gates.
Oakham		Rutland SK8568008922	1899 or 1901	A Midland Railway type 2B box
Oswestry South		Shropshire SJ2936629707	1882	Built by Dutton & Co. for the Cambrian Railways with a porch characteristic of the contractor's signal boxes
Par		Cornwall SX0769054062	c. 1879	A Great Western Railway type 2 box
Parbold		Lancashire SD4911310736	1877	A Saxby & Farmer Type 9 box built for the Lancashire and Yorkshire Railway, with frame dating from 1983
Petersfield		Hampshire SU7440923616	c. 1885	London & South Western Railway Type 3a box containing a 10-lever Stevens (Railway Signalling Co.) frame and locking rack from about 1880, with block instruments, and a track diagram from 1974
Plumpton		East Sussex TQ3651616091	1891	A London, Brighton & South Coast Railway Type 2 box, built at about the same time as the railway station
Princes Risborough North		Buckinghamshire SP7993202966	1908	A "Churchward"-era Great Western Railway Type 7 design
Pulborough		West Sussex TQ0435318732	1878	Saxby & Farmer Type 5 box built for the London, Brighton & South Coast Railway (LB&SCR), with a 1905-pattern LB&SCR 29-lever frame with 25 levers
Ruislip		Greater London TQ0951187027	1904	A Metropolitan Railway design signal box built by the Harrow and Uxbridge Railway, worked by the Metropolitan Railway from 1905
Runcorn		Cheshire (Halton) SJ5090682522	1940	Built by the London, Midland and Scottish Railway in a Modernist style, this was one of the signal boxes designed to minimise the blast damage from aerial bombing during World War II. Contains the original 46-lever frame.
Rye		East Sussex TQ9187920553	1894	A Saxby & Farmer Type 12 box for the South Eastern Railway, containing an earlier original 1888 Duplex frame with 14 levers
Sandford		North Somerset ST4162259541	1869	A block house, which housed early signalling equipment. Designed by Frances Fox for the Bristol & Exeter Railway.
Selside		Lancashire (Carnforth Steamtown) SD4963470815	1907	Built by the Midland Railway for Selside on the Settle to Carlisle Line, this box was moved in 1976 to Carnforth Steamtown, which has since closed to the public.
Settle		North Yorkshire SD8170863421	1891	Standard Midland Railway Type 2a box with the original 20-lever frame and interlocking mechanism, moved and restored 1997–1999
Shepherds Well		Kent; TR2574248275	c. 1878	A London, Chatham & Dover Railway signal box with original 23-lever frame
Shildon		County Durham NZ2366825688	1887	A variant of the North Eastern Railway Central Division's Type C2, possibly designed by the Thomas Prosser. A McKenzie & Holland 16-lever frame dates from 1928, although reduced from 55 to 42 levers in 1984.
Shrewsbury Crewe Junction		Shropshire SJ4936013060	1902–1903	An atypical London & North Western Railway type 4 box for the London and North Western and Great Western Railway Joint Committee
Shrewsbury Severn Bridge Junction		Shropshire SJ4969712678	1903	An atypical London & North Western Railway type 4 box for the London and North Western and Great Western Railway Joint Committee, containing an LNWR 180-lever frame
Skegness		Lincolnshire TF5602563051	1882	A timber framed Great Northern Railway Type 1 box, enlarged in 1900, still containing its lever frame
Sleaford East		Lincolnshire TF0687845398	c. 1882	A Great Northern Railway Type 1, built for the Great Northern and Great Eastern Joint Railway
Snodland		Kent; TQ7067461795	1870s	Built by the South Eastern Railway, later extended to ease operation of the level crossing gates
St Albans South		Hertfordshire TL1553106891	1892	A large three-bay Midland-Railway–design box
St Bees		Cumbria NX9702911989	1891	The Furness Railway Type 3 box was designed in arts and crafts style to complement the stations. This one contains its original Railway Signal Company 24-lever frame.
St Mary's Crossing		Gloucestershire SO8859102237	c. 1875	A Great Western Railway Type 2 box
Stoke Canon		Devon SX9368297998	c. 1874	Built by Saxby & Farmer for the Bristol & Exeter Railway
Stow Park		Lincolnshire SK8566181465	1877	A Great Northern Railway Type 1 box
Sudbury		Staffordshire SK1625330662	1885	Built by the North Staffordshire Railway from a design derived from the McKenzie & Holland type 1 box, this contains the original 24-lever frame and wheel to control the level crossing gates.
Swinderby		Lincolnshire SK8684664379	1901	A Midland Railway signal box containing the original lever frame
Thetford		Norfolk TL8672483687	1883	A Great Eastern Railway Type 4 box with the original McKenzie & Holland lever frame
Topsham		Devon SX9664888408	c. 1870	A modified London and South Western Railway type 1 design
Torquay		Devon (Torbay) SX9058363397	1878	This signal box was built by the Great Western Railway at the same time as the station.
Torre		Devon (Torbay) SX9033264843	1921–1922	A Great Western Railway type 7 box with its original lever frame
Totnes		Devon SX8017960959	1923	A Great Western Railway type 7 box
Tutbury Crossing		South Derbyshire SK2149929677	1872	A McKenzie & Holland Type 1 box for the North Staffordshire Railway, containing a McKenzie & Holland 5 inches (130 mm) lever frame installed in 1897
Wainfleet		Lincolnshire TF4970858749	1899	A later Great Northern Railway box, with a Railway Signal Co. lever frame
Wansford		Cambridgeshire TL0932497972	1907	London & North Western Railway Type 5 box
Warmley		South Gloucestershire ST6712673504	1918	A Midland Railway type 4D box with a pre-1943 LMS 16-lever frame
Wateringbury		Kent; TQ6906252788	1893	A Saxby & Farmer Type 12 built the South Eastern Railway
Weaverthorpe		North Yorkshire SE9568078149	c. 1900	Built for the North Eastern Railway
Wellow		Bath and North East Somerset ST7402358186	1892	A Somerset and Dorset Joint Railway Type 2 box. After closure in 1962 the box was converted into an artist's studio for Peter Blake, and it has since being expanded and adapted into living accommodation.
West Street Junction (Boston)		Lincolnshire TF3223643948	1875	A Great Northern Railway Type 1 box, with a 60-lever McKenzie & Holland frame dating from 1894
Weston-super-Mare		North Somerset ST3246661108	c. 1866	Built for the Bristol and Exeter Railway, this is possibly the oldest surviving signal box on the British rail system.
Williton		Somerset ST0856241534	1862	An early Bristol and Exeter Railway signal box, containing the original lever frame
Woking		Surrey TQ0056858644	1937	A British Railways Southern Region International Modern Style box
Wolferton		Norfolk TF6600028507	1862	A non-standard Great Eastern Railway Type 5, designed to complement the royal station, moved 1898–1899 to allow the line to be widened. Listed as Grade II*.
Woolston		Southampton SU4393111240	1901	A London & South Western Railway Type 4 box
Worksop East		Nottinghamshire SK5866679726	c. 1880 – c. 1885	Built by the Manchester, Sheffield & Lincolnshire Railway
Wrawby Junction (near Barnetby railway station)		North Lincolnshire TA0468609316	7 May 1916	Built by the Great Central Railway with 132 levers, five levers were added later.
Wroxham		Norfolk TG3031218644	1900	A Great Eastern Railway Type 7 box, probably built by McKenzie & Holland, housing a McKenzie and Holland 50-lever frame of the same age. Has been moved slightly away from the tracks.
Wylam		Northumberland NZ1196264484	1897	A North Eastern Railway (Northern Division) Type 5 on a bridge over the railway
Wymondham South Junction		Norfolk TG1132200889	1877	A Great Eastern Railway Type 2 box, with a McKenzie & Holland 42-lever frame of unknown date
York railway station (Platform)		York SE5959751712	1900–1909	The wooden signal box above the bookshop on the platform is listed with the Grade II* railway station.
York railway station (1951)		York SE5959751712	1951	The orange brick signal box built on the western side is listed with the Grade II* railway station.

== See also ==
- Signal boxes that are listed buildings in Scotland

== Notes and references ==
=== Sources ===
- Minnis, John (February 2012). Railway signal boxes: A Review (PDF) (Report). English Heritage. ISSN 2046-9802.
