= Runcorn signal box =

Railway control building in Cheshire, England

Coordinates: 53.33731°N 2.73874°W

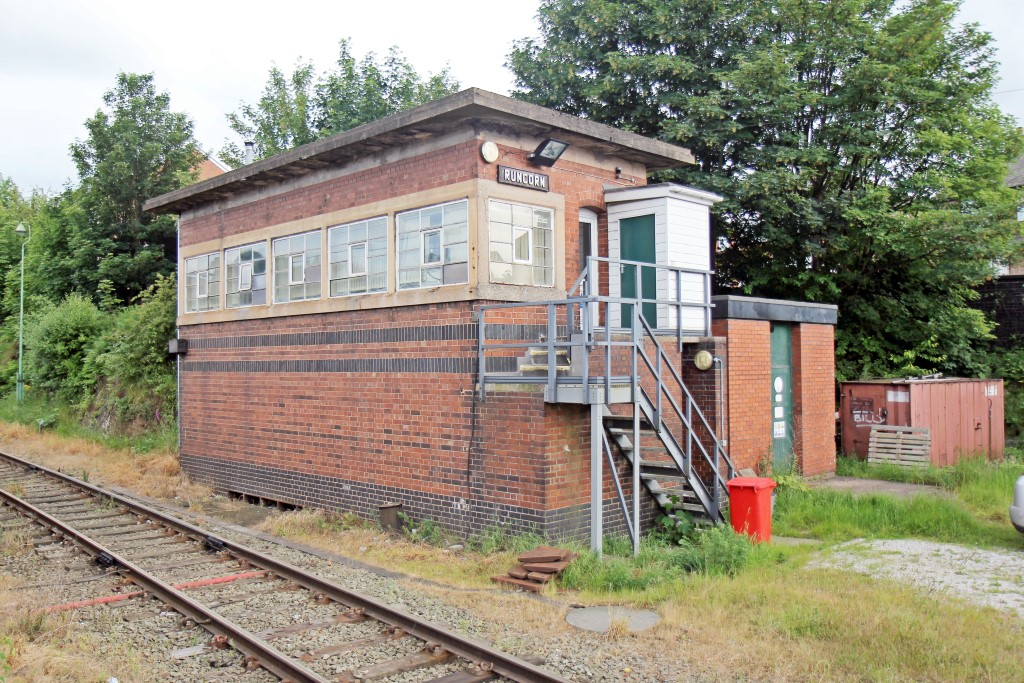
Runcorn signal box

Runcorn signal box is a railway control building sited at the south end of Runcorn railway station in Cheshire, England. It is located to the west of the West Coast Main Line and the branch line to Folly Lane. The signal box is recorded in the National Heritage List for England as a designated Grade II listed building. It was built by the London, Midland and Scottish Railway (LMS) in the early years of the Second World War incorporating the specifications of the Air Raid Precautions (ARP), and was one of the first of such signal boxes to be operational.

== History ==
The signal box was designed and built by the London, Midland and Scottish Railway (LMS) to replace an earlier timber signal box that stood on a gantry. It was opened in January 1940. In the years approaching the Second World War, and in the early years of the war, precautions were taken to protect existing signal boxes from enemy bombing. In addition, some new signal boxes were built according to the specifications of the Air Raid Precautions (ARP); these were designed to protect against damage by blast rather than from a direct hit. The specifications included brick walls 14 inches (360 mm) thick, flat roofs of reinforced concrete 12 inches (300 mm) thick, and metal window frames. The use of timber was reduced to a minimum to reduce the risk of fire. The LMS built over 50 signal boxes between 1939 and 1950 incorporating the ARP specifications, and the Runcorn box was one of the earliest of these signal boxes to have been operational.

== Description ==
Runcorn signal box is designed in Modernist style, constructed in red brick on a plinth of blue engineering bricks. It has a reinforced concrete floor and roof, and the windows are set in steel frames. The lower storey in the two-storey building, contains the locking room, is without windows, and is decorated with two bands of blue engineering brick. The upper floor contains the operating room, has five windows along the east side, and one window each on the north and south sides. Each window is divided into eleven frames; the outer frames are fixed, and the larger central frame is an opening casement. The flat concrete roof projects on all sides. The signal box is entered by a doorway on the north side, which is approached by a flight of modern steel steps. At the top of the steps is a modern toilet cubicle. Inside the operating room is the original lever frame of 46 levers.

== Appraisal ==
The signal box was designated as a Grade II listed building on 21 November 2013. This grade is the lowest of the three gradings given to listed buildings and is applied to "buildings of national importance and special interest". The reasons given for listing are:

- Representativeness, it is described as "a good, characteristic example of a Air Raid Precaution specification signal box";
- Quality of preservation, including the "original, distinctive metal framed windows";
- It is believed to have been one of the first ARP signal boxes to be placed in operation;
- It is considered "a good illustration" of the use of Modernist design for ARP signal boxes on the London, Midland and Scottish Railway.

== See also ==
- Listed buildings in Runcorn (urban area)
- Signal boxes that are listed buildings in England
