= Signal boxes that are listed buildings in Scotland =

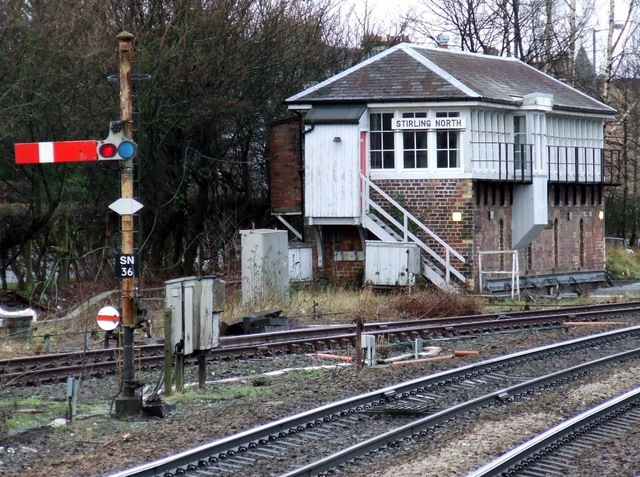
Stirling North signal box

A number of signal boxes in Scotland are on the Statutory List of Buildings of Special Architectural or Historic Interest. Signal boxes house the signalman and equipment that control the railway points and signals. Originally railway signals were controlled from a hut on a platform at junctions, but by the 1860s this had developed into a raised building with a glazed upper storey, containing levers controlling points and signals. Railway companies either built boxes to their own designs, or used the design of the signalling manufacturers, such as Stevens & Sons, McKenzie & Holland and Dutton & Co.

Listed buildings are placed in one of three categories: Category A for buildings of national or international importance, Category B for particularly important buildings of regional or more than local importance and Category C for buildings that local importance, or lesser examples of any period, style, or building type. At the end of the second world war there were more than 2,000 signal boxes in Scotland. Network Rail published plans in 2011 to control the railway lines in Great Britain from fourteen centres within thirty years, decommissioning the remaining mechanical signal boxes, and a joint Historic Scotland and Network Rail project reviewed the signal boxes in Scotland in 2013/14.

== Signal boxes ==
Name	Category	Image	Location	Date	Notes
Annan	B		Dumfries and Galloway NY1909066229	1877	A Glasgow & South Western Railway Type 1 signal box. A 20-lever Stevens & Sons/Caledonian frame was installed in 1973.
Arbroath North	B		Angus NO6391041273	1911	A North British Railway Type 7 containing a Stevens & Son 72-lever frame.
Arisaig	B		Highland NM6642386734	1901	Built by the Railway Signal Company for the extension of the West Highland Railway in 1901, it is similar in style to North British Railway's Type 6a boxes.
Arrochar & Tarbet	B		Argyll and Bute		A North British Railway's Type 6b signal box listed with the railway station.
Auldbar Road	C		Angus NO5379150933	c. 1876	A Caledonian Railway Type 1 box, converted into a sun room in about 1990.
Aviemore	B		Highland NH8964512739	1892	The largest McKenzie & Holland box built for the Highland Railway that still stands.
Biggar	B		South Lanarkshire NT0397437252	1906	Listed with the railway station, this is a Caledonian Railway Type S4 signal box.
Boat of Garten North	B		Highland NH9438419035		Built for the Highland Railway, both signal boxes are listed with the heritage station. This is a McKenzie & Holland Type 3 weatherboard design with its original lever frame.
Boat of Garten South	B		Highland NH9432118691	1922	Built for the Highland Railway, both signal boxes are listed with the heritage station, and this is a Highland Railway design. The lever frame was replaced by one from Carrbridge South in 1993, but the original is in storage.
Bridge of Orchy	B		Argyll and Bute NN3004039393	1894	A North British Railway Type 6a design built for the West Highland Railway.
Clachnaharry	B		Highland NH6481646578	1890	Listed with its associated swing bridge, this signal box is a McKenzie & Holland Type 3 box built for the Highland Railway.
Corrour	C		Highland NN3563466389	1894	A North British Railway Type 6a design built for the West Highland Railway. The station was opened to serve a private estate and the design of the signal box was adapted to complement the waiting room.
Dalmally	C		Argyll and Bute NN1599027202	1896	Listed with the railway station, the signal box is a Caledonian Railway (Northern Division) Type 2.
Dumfries	B		Dumfries and Galloway NX9764176673	Early 1950s	The British Rail Scottish Region Type 16 design box is listed with the mid 19th station.
Dunkeld	B		Perth and Kinross NO0323041552	1919	A Highland Railway box similar in style to those at Boat of Garten.
Dunragit	B		Dumfries and Galloway NX14825745	1927	London, Midland and Scottish Railway Type 12 box with a 32-lever frame.
Elgin Centre	C		Moray NJ2206862194	1888	A Great North of Scotland Railway Type 2 box.
Errol	B		Perth and Kinross NO2252724496	1877	Caledonian Railway Type 1 signal box, containing a 20-lever locking frame from 1911.
Garelochhead	B		Argyll and Bute NN3002739441	1894	Listed with the railway station, this is a North British Railway Type 6a box adapted for used on the West Highland Railway
Garnqueen South (Bo'ness)	A		Falkirk NT0026081749	1899	A Caledonian Railway (Southern Division) Type S4 signal box, relocated from Garnqueen South to Bo'ness.
Girvan	B		South Ayrshire NX1903498370	1893	Listed with the railway station, this is a Glasgow & South Western Railway Type 3 box; two bays were added in the late 20th century.
Glenfinnan	B		Highland NM8991180956	1901	Listed with the railway station, this signal box was built by the Railway Signal Company for the extension of the West Highland Railway in 1901. It is similar in style to North British Railway's Type 6a boxes
Helmsdale	B		Highland ND0236015519	1894	Listed with the railway station, this is a Samuel Dutton & Co. Type 1 signal box
Kingussie	B		Highland NH7568800412	1894	Listed with the railway station, this is a Type 3 box by McKenzie & Holland. The porch was extended in 2007.
Kippen	C		Stirling (council area) NS6649395702	1893	A non-standard North British Railway signal box.
Knockando (Tamdhu Distillery)	C		Moray NJ1905541707	1899	Great North of Scotland Railway signal box with a 7-lever frame.
Montrose North	C		Angus NO71185830	1881	North British Railway Type 1, containing a Stevens & Sons 51-lever frame.
Murthly	B		Perth and Kinross NO1010838357	1898	A modified Mackenzie & Holland Type 3 box built for the Highland Railway; it was moved from Inverness to Murthly in 1919. Contains a Mckenzie & Holland 16-lever frame.
Nairn East	B		Highland NH8828456083	1891	Listed with the railway station and the West box, this is a Highland Railway single storey signal box, similar in style to the McKenzie & Holland type 3.
Nairn West	B		Highland NH8797855905	1891	Listed with the railway station and the East box, this is a Highland Railway two storey signal box, similar in style to the McKenzie & Holland type 3.
Pitlochry	A		Perth and Kinross NN9371158122	1911	Listed with the railway station and footbridge, the Highland Railway signal box is based on a McKenzie & Holland design.
Rannoch	B		Perth and Kinross NN4225657908	1894	The signal box is listed together with the railway station and portrait in stone of James Renton, a former railway director. The box is the North British Railway Type 6a design modified for the West Highland Railway, and was restored in 2005. It includes a 17-lever frame.
Rogart South	C		Highland NC7246202006	1891 or 1894	This is a Dutton & Co. Type 1 box similar in style to the McKenzie & Holland Type 3.
Rosyth Dockyard	B		Fife NT1095382170	c. 1917	North British Railway Type 7 signal box with Stevens & Sons lever frame.
Spean Bridge	C		Highland NN2217281430	1949	Listed with the railway station, the signal box is a 1945 design London and North Eastern Railway Type 15 built by British Rail Scottish Region. The Stevens & Sons 30-lever frame has been removed.
St Fillans	B		Perth and Kinross NN6991724414	1901	Listed with its former railway station, this is a variant of the Caledonian Railway (Southern Division) Type S4 signal box.
Stirling Middle	A		Stirling (City) NS8011693427	1900	Listed with the railway station and the North box, this is a Caledonian Railway (Northern Division) Type 2 signal box containing 96-lever pattern frame.
Stirling North	A		Stirling (City) NS7970293855	1901	Listed with the railway station and the Middle box, this is a Caledonian Railway (Northern Division) Type 2 signal box containing a 48-lever frame.
Stonehaven	B		Aberdeenshire NO8641986210	1901	Listed with its railway station, this is a Caledonian Railway (Northern Division) Type 2 signal box with a 40 lever Stevens and Sons frame.
Tyndrum Upper	B		Stirling (council area) NN3338720220	1894	Listed with the railway station, the signal box is a North British Railway Type 6a design built for the West Highland Railway.
Waverley West	B		Edinburgh NT2552773750	1936	Signal box based on the London and North Eastern Railway Type 13 and was installed with an early form of power signalling

== See also ==
- Signal boxes that are listed buildings in England

== Notes and references ==
=== Sources ===
- Signal boxes (PDF) (Report). Historic Scotland. 2014.
