= Hebden Bridge signal box =

Signal box in West Yorkshire, England

Coordinates: 53.7372°N 2.00795°W

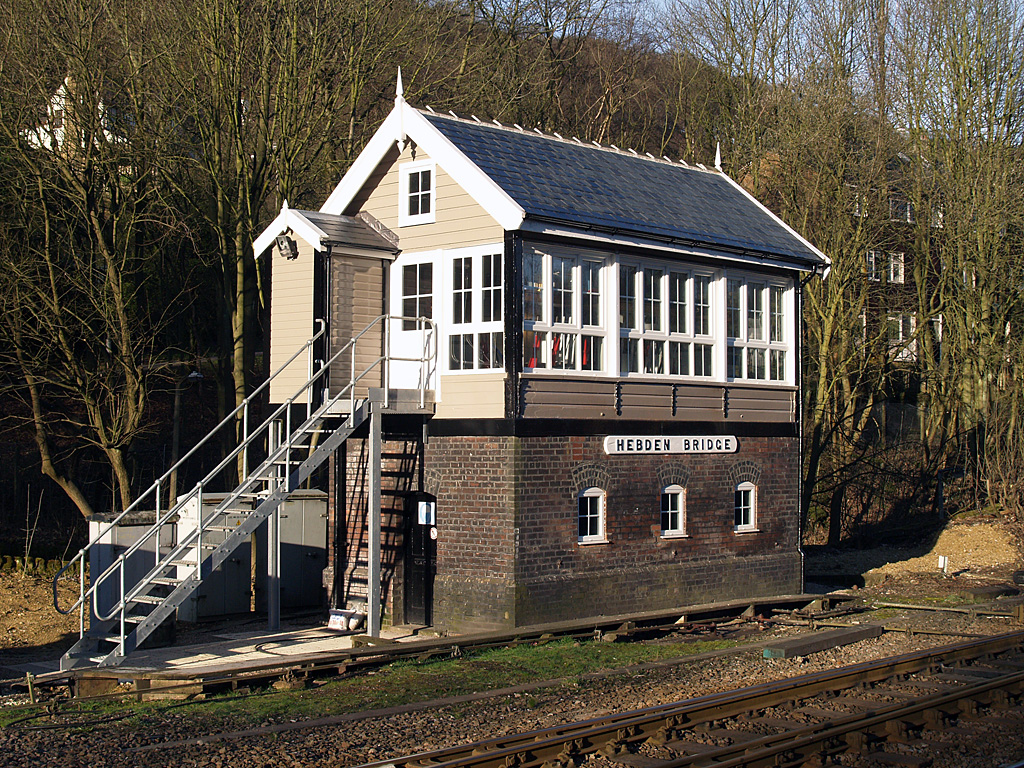
Hebden Bridge signal box, March 2008

Hebden Bridge signal box is a Grade II listed former Lancashire and Yorkshire Railway signal box, located close to Hebden Bridge railway station in West Yorkshire, England.

Built in 1891, it is one of only a few remaining L&YR signal boxes to survive in anything like original condition.

In July 2013, it was one of 26 "highly distinctive" signal boxes listed by Ed Davey, minister for the Department for Culture, Media and Sport, in a joint initiative by English Heritage and Network Rail to preserve and provide a window into how railways were operated in the past.

The signal box was taken out of operational use from 20 October 2018 when the line through Hebden Bridge was resignalled with control transferred to York Rail Operating Centre.
