= Birmingham New Street Signal Box =

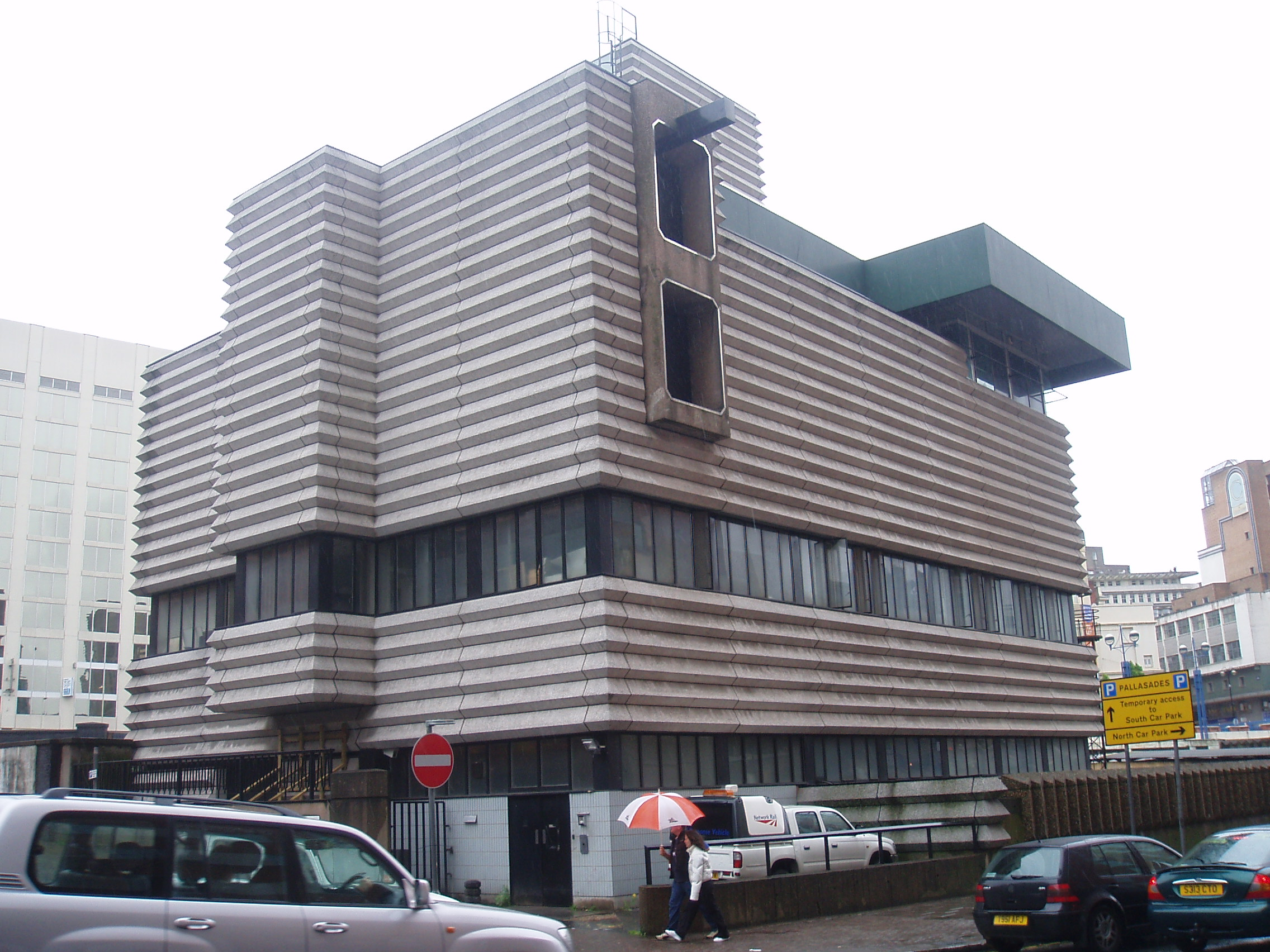
- Interactive map of the Birmingham New Street Signal Box area

General information
- Architectural style: Brutalism
- Location: Navigation Street, Birmingham, England
- Coordinates: 52.4780°N 1.9025°W
- Opened: 3 July 1966
- Closed: 24 December 2022
- Client: British Rail
- Owner: Network Rail

Technical details
- Floor count: 5

Birmingham New Street Signal Box is a railway signal box in Birmingham, central England. It is situated on the corner of Brunel and Navigation Streets and at the west end of the platforms of Birmingham New Street railway station. Opened on 3 July 1966, the brutalist structure is a grade II listed building for its architectural value and a prominent city centre landmark. It closed on 24 December 2022.

== Description ==
The building is a power signal box, meaning that it controls points and signals by electricity rather than the traditional levers and frames.

The box is five storeys high on a rectangular plan except the ground floor, which is adjacent to the tracks. The main entrance is at street level, on the first floor. The shape of the building is unique due to the congested nature of the site, hemmed in by railway tracks at below ground and local roads at street level. The interior contains office facilities and communication equipment; the top floor is the signalling control room. The lowest floor, at track level, has an extension which occupies a space between the tracks and the cutting wall.

The building's frame is made from reinforced concrete with corrugated precast concrete cladding and similar boundary walls. The cladding is interrupted vertically by metal-framed windows. Both are continuous across all four sides. At the top is a flat roof with a prominent fascia, designed to provide shade for the control equipment.

== History ==
The box was designed by Bicknell and Hamilton (an architectural practice led by John Bicknell and Paul Hamilton) in collaboration with Ray Moorcroft, British Rail's regional architect for the London Midland region. An example of brutalist architecture, it was built from 1964 to 1966 as part of the remodelling of New Street station. The box underwent a renovation and deep clean in 2001.

The construction of the signal box and the remodelling of the station were part of the West Coast Main Line route modernisation, which included overhead electrification of the entire route. The box was one of four power signal boxes in the West Midlands which replaced 64 manual signal boxes along the route. It controlled 36 route miles. The equipment inside included a telephone exchange and control panels for the relevant parts of the network.

The box was designated a grade II listed building on 24 November 1995, along with several other post-war railway buildings including Coventry railway station and Harlow Town railway station, as part of a re-evaluation of such structures. The official list entry describes it as "very much a 'one off' constructed on a very difficult and congested site" and "a dramatic building of exceptional architectural quality with a strongly sculptural form". The following February, The Railway Magazine described the division of opinion surrounding the building: "described by some as the principal architectural monument of the WCML modernisation and by others as an eyesore". David Lawrence, in an examination of British Rail architecture, felt that the ridged concrete surfaces implied impenetrability and showed "the architects' interest in the use of exposed concrete as architectural sculpture".

From 2005, the technology used in the box was increasingly outdated and spare parts were in short supply. Network Rail began reducing its area of operation as part of its work to digitise signalling on the railway network. The box closed on 24 December 2022, with its functions transferred to Saltley Rail Operating Centre. A Network Rail spokesperson told Architects' Journal that the structure's upper floors could be repurposed as a training facility; Network Rail maintenance teams are based in the lower part of the box, which will remain the property of Network Rail and in regular use.

== See also ==
- Signal boxes that are listed buildings in England
- List of Brutalist structures
